= Timeline of Abu Sayyaf attacks =

The following is a list of attacks which have been carried out by Abu Sayyaf, a militant group based in and around Jolo and Basilan islands in the southwestern part of the Philippines, where for more than four decades, Moro groups have been engaged in an insurgency for an independent province in the country.

== 2000 ==
- 25 February – Abu Sayyaf bombers attacked Ozamiz City in Misamis Oriental.
- 23 April – Abu Sayyaf gunmen raid the Malaysian diving resort of Sipadan, off Borneo and flee across the sea border to their Jolo island stronghold with 10 Western tourists and 11 resort workers.
- 27 May – The kidnappers issue political demands including a separate Muslim state, an inquiry into alleged human rights abuses in Sabah and the restoration of fishing rights. They later demand cash multimillion-dollar ransoms.
- 1 July – Filipino television evangelist Wilde Almeda of the Jesus Miracle Crusade (JMC) and 12 of his follsited the Abu Sayyaf headquarters. A German journalist is seized the following day.
- 9 July – A three-member French television crew was abducted.
- 27 August – French, South African and German hostages are freed.
- 28 August – United States Muslim convert Jeffrey Schilling is abducted.
- 9 September – Finnish, German and French hostages are freed.
- 10 September – Abu Sayyaf raids Pandanan island near Sipadan and seizes three Malaysians.
- 16 September – The government troops launch military assault against Abu Sayyaf in Jolo. Two kidnapped French journalists escape during the fighting.
- 2 October – JMC Evangelist Wilde Almeda and 12 "prayer warriors" were released.
- 25 October – Special Malaysian Troops rescue the three Malaysians seized in Pandanan.

== 2001 ==
- 12 April – Jeffrey Schilling is rescued, leaving Filipino scuba diving instructor, Roland Ullah, in the gunmen's hands.
- 22 May – Suspected Abu Sayyaf gunmen raid the luxurious Pearl Farm beach resort on Samal island in southern Philippines, killing two resort workers wounding three others, but no hostages were taken.
- 28 May – Suspected Abu Sayyaf gunmen raid the Dos Palmas resort off the western Philippines island of Palawan and seize 18 hostages including a United States couple and former Manila Times owner Reghis Romero. Arroyo rules out ransom and orders the military to go after the kidnappers.
- 29 May – Malacañang imposes a news blackout in Basilan province where the Abu Sayyaf are reported to have gone.
- 30 May – United States Department Spokesman Philip Reeker calls for the "swift, safe and unconditional release of all the hostages." An Olympus camera and an ATM card of one of the hostages are found in Cagayan de Tawi-Tawi island. Pictures of Abu Sayyaf leaders are released to media by the Armed Forces of the Philippines.
- 31 May – The military fails to locate the bandits and hostages despite search and rescue operations in Jolo, Basilan and Cagayan de Tawi-Tawi.
- 1 June – Military troops engage Abu Sayyaf bandits in Tuburan town in Basilan. Abu Sayyaf spokesman Abu Sabaya threatens to behead two of the hostages.
- 2 June – Abu Sayyaf invaded Lamitan town and seize the José Maria Torres Memorial Hospital and the Saint Peter's church. Soldiers surround the bandits and engage them in a day-long firefight. Several hostages, including businessman Reghis Romero, were able to escape. Witnesses say the bandits escape from Lamitan at around 5:30 in the afternoon, taking four medical personnel from the hospital.
- 3 June – Soldiers recover the decapitated bodies of hostages Sonny Dacquer and Armando Bayona in Barangay Bulanting.
- 4 June – Military officials ask for a state of emergency in Basilan. President Gloria Arroyo turns the request down.
- 5 June – At least 16 soldiers are reported killed and 44 others wounded during a firefight between government troops and Abu Sayyaf members in Mount Sinangkapan in Tuburan town. President Arroyo promises 5 million pesos to the family of retired Col. Fernando Bajet for killing Abu Sayyaf leader Abu Sulayman on 2 June 2000. Abu Sayyaf leaders contact a government designated intermediary for possible negotiations.
- 6 June – Abu Sayyaf leader Abu Sabaya tells Radio Mindanao Network that United States hostage Martin Burnham sustained a gunshot wound on the back during a recent exchange of gunfire.
- 2 August - Abu Sayyaf bandits attacked a predominantly Christian village named "Balobo" in the Island of Basilan in which they abducted 32 people, 11 of which they executed

== 2002 ==
- 21 July – A provincial governor and three others were wounded when fighters of the Abu Sayyaf ambushed them in the southern Philippines, the military said.
- August – Six Filipino Jehovah's Witnesses were kidnapped and two of them were beheaded.
- 2 October – One American serviceman was killed and another seriously injured by a bomb blast in Zamboanga City.

== 2003 ==
- 12 February – The Philippines expelled an Iraqi diplomat, accusing the envoy of having ties to the Abu Sayyaf terrorist group. Second Secretary Husham Husain has been given 48 hours to leave the country, according to a statement by Philippine Foreign Secretary Blas Ople. The government said it had intelligence that the Iraqi diplomat has ties to the Islamic extremist group. The decision was taken more than a month before the 2003 invasion of Iraq.
- 5 March – Abu Sayyaf claimed responsibility for the bombings in Francisco Bangoy International Airport in the southern Philippines, killing 21 and injuring 148.

== 2004 ==
- 24 February – A bomb explodes on SuperFerry 14 off the coast of Manila, causing it to sink and killing 116 people. This attack is the worst terrorist attack at sea.
- 9 April – A key leader of the Islamic terrorist group Abu Sayyaf was killed, along with five of his men, during a gun battle with government troops in the southern Philippines. Hamsiraji Marusi Sali and his men were killed when a platoon of the Philippine Army's elite Scout Rangers, who had been on the terrorists' trail, attacked them around midday on the island of Basilan, an Abu Sayyaf stronghold about 885 kilometres, or 550 miles, south of the capital, Manila. Four government soldiers, including the commanding officer Noel S. Buan, were injured.
- 10 April – Around 50 prisoners including many suspected members of the Abu Sayyaf escaped from jail in the southern Philippines, the officials said. Three of the escaped prisoners were later killed and three others have since been recaptured, while three jail guards were wounded in the incident on the island of Basilan. They still did not have a full headcount of those who escaped, but local army commander Colonel Raymundo Ferrer said 53 of the 137 prisoners in the jail on the outskirts of Isabela City had broken out.

== 2005 ==
- 14 February – The Valentine's Day bombings took place in three major cities of the Philippines namely; Makati, Davao City and General Santos. The incidents claimed numerous lives (including children), injuries and big amount of damaged properties. Immediately after an hour there was a claimed coming from the Abu Sayyaf Chieftain Khadaffy Janjalani and Abu Solaiman via media interview that the bombings were the terrorists' Valentines gift to President Gloria Macapagal Arroyo and to the citizenry to praise their belief. This was recorded as terrorist attack that caused the biggest downfall effects in the Philippine economic history in terms of tourism industry, foreign investors and socioeconomic undertakings of the people. The issuance of travel advisories from numerous nations was paramount after the incident.
- 15 March – Several Abu Sayyaf top leaders attempted to escape from the Camp Bagong Diwa in Bicutan, Taguig City. They killed 4 government soldiers in revenge of killing his 2 men. They barricaded the Special Intensive Care Area (SICA) compound. This started the Bagong Diwa siege. 29 hours later, the Special Action Force of the Philippine National Police sieges the compound, killing 22 men, including its leaders.
- 17 November – A prominent leader of the Islamist group Abu Sayyaf, Jatib Usman, has been killed in ongoing clashes between rebels and the military. Usman was confronted in the most southeastern province of Tawi-Tawi, an island region which is close to the Borneo coast of Malaysia.

== 2006 ==
- 3 February – Suspected Abu Sayyaf gunmen knocked on the door of a farm in Patikul, Mindanao and opened fire after asking residents if they were Christians or from another religion. Six people are confirmed dead, including a nine-month baby girl and five others are seriously wounded.
- 20 March – Declassified documents seized from Saddam Hussein's government were said to have revealed that Al-Qaeda agents financed by Saddam entered the Philippines through the country's southern backdoor.
- 19 September – A Filipino Marine officer was killed after the government forces encountered a large group of Abu Sayyaf terrorists earlier day in the outskirts of Patikul town in Sulu, southern Philippines, a military official reported. Five Marine soldiers also were wounded in the clash with some 80 terrorists believed to be led by Abu Sayyaf leader Radullan Sahiron, alias commander Putol, one of the top terrorist leader based in Sulu province, said the spokesman.

== 2007 ==
- 17 January – Abu Sayyaf leader, Abu Sulaiman is killed in a gun battle against the Philippine Army in Jolo.
- 11 July – Eight Filipino government soldiers were killed, nine others injured and six missing following a gun battle against Abu Sayyaf soldiers, supported by armed villagers in the southern island province of Basilan, according to a military source.
- 9 August – The military said it lost 26 soldiers and killed around 30 militants in three days of fighting on the volatile island of Jolo, in the beginning of month. The heaviest toll occurred after militants ambushed a military convoy.

== 2008 ==
- 17 January – Abu Sayyaf militants raided a convent in Tawi-Tawi and killed a Catholic missionary during a kidnapping attempt.
- 14 February – Failed assassination plot of the President of the Philippines, Gloria Arroyo.
- 8 June – ABS-CBN Journalist Ces Drilon and her TV Crew kidnapped. 10 days later they were released after families paid a portion of the ransom.
- 23 September – A mid-level leader of the Abu Sayyaf group and a follower surrendered to the Marine Battalion Landing Team-5 (MBLT-5) in Sulu province. Colonel Eugenio Clemen, chief of the 3rd Marine Brigade, identified the bandits who surrendered as Hadjili Hari and Faizal Dali, his son-in-law.

== 2009 ==
- 15 January – Three Red Cross officials, Swiss Andreas Notter, Filipino Mary Jane Lacaba and Italian Eugenio Vagni were kidnapped. Andreas Notter and Mary Jane Lacaba were released four months later. Eugenio Vagni was released six months later on 12 July.
- 14 April – Abu Sayyaf militants executed Cosme Aballes, one of two hostages they took during a raid on a Christian community in Lamitan City in Basilan on Good Friday, the military said. The bandits were with members of the Moro Islamic Liberation Front (MILF) and of kidnap for ransom groups. Aballes and Ernan Chavez were taken by at least 40 Abu Sayyaf, rogue Moro National Liberation Front (MNLF) rebels and KFR elements when they raided Sitio Arco in Lamitan City. On their way out, the kidnappers shot dead a resident, Jacinto Clemente.
- 18 May – Abu Sayyaf militants in Basilan beheaded a 61-year-old man who was abducted from this city about three weeks before, the police said.
- 12 July – The Italian Red Cross hostage, Eugenio Vagni, was released.
- 12 August – A group of Abu Sayyaf militants and members of the MNLF ambushed a group of AFP (Armed Forces of the Philippines) soldiers as they conducted a clearing operation in the mountains of Tipo-Tipo, Basilan. 23 AFP soldiers were killed in the engagement, 20 of which were members of the Philippine Marines Corps. In addition, 31 Abu Sayyaf militants were killed in an initial body count.
- 20 September – The AFP took an Abu Sayyaf camp at Sitio Talibang, Brgy Buansa, Indanan, Sulu.
- 21 September – AFP overran a camp in Sitio Talatak, Brgy Bato-Bato, Indanan, Sulu belonging to the Abu Sayyaf, killing nearly 20 militants. 5 soldiers were wounded.
- 29 September – Two United States soldiers were killed in Jolo, near the town of Indanan, by Abu Sayyaf militants.
- 14 October – An Irish-born priest was kidnapped from outside his home near Pagadian city in Mindanao. He was released on 11 November 2009.
- 9 November – A school teacher in Jolo was captured on 19 October and beheaded by Abu Sayyaf militants.
- 10 November – Abu Sayyaf militants captured several Chinese and Filipino nationals in Basilan.

== 2010 ==
- 21 January – Suspected Abu Sayyaf militants detonated a bomb near the house of a Basilan province mayor. One teenager was injured.
- 21 February – One Abu Sayyaf senior leaders, Albader Parad, has been killed.
- 27 February – Suspected Abu Sayyaf militants killed one militiaman and 12 civilians in Maluso.
- 16 March – Suspected Abu Sayyaf militants killed a police officer in Zamboanga.

== 2011 ==
- 12 January – Four travelling merchants and a guide were killed and one wounded when suspected Abu Sayyaf militants ambushed them in Basilan.
- 18 January – One soldier was killed when government forces clashed with Abu Sayyaf militants in the province of Basilan.
- 5 December – Australian national Warren Rodwell was shot through the hand when kidnapped from his home at Ipil, Zamboanga Sibugay. He was released on 23 March 2013 in exchange for cash.

== 2012 ==
- 1 February – Dutch national Ewold Horn and Swiss citizen Lorenzo Vinciguerra, both birdwatchers, were kidnapped during a research trip in Tawi-Tawi. On 6 December 2014, Lorenzo Vinciguerra was rescued after he escaped from his captors when the troops under the Joint Task Force Sulu attacked the Abu Sayyaf group about 5:20 a.m. However, one of the ASG shot and wounded the Swiss national as he was escaping. As of that date, Dutch national Ewold Horn is still in captivity by the Abu Sayyaf.

== 2013 ==
- 27 May – At least 7 militants and 7 marines were killed when the government forces tried to rescue 6 hostages.
- 15 November – Abu Sayyaf gunmen raid the Malaysian resort in Pom Pom, off Semporna, killing one Taiwanese tourist and flee across the sea border to Sulu Archipelago with another Taiwanese hostage. The hostage was later rescued by the Philippines security forces in Sulu Province.

== 2014 ==
- 2 April – Abu Sayyaf gunmen raid another Malaysian resort in Semporna and flee across the sea border to Sulu Archipelago with a Chinese and Filipino hostages. The two hostages were later rescued on 31 May with a collaboration by the Malaysian and the Philippines security forces. 25 April – Abu Sayyaf gunmen abduct a retired German doctor and his girlfriend from their yacht near the island of Palawan. They are released on 17 October. The group claims to have collected a $5.6 million ransom from the German government.
- 6 May – Five Abu Sayyaf gunmen raid a Malaysian fish farm in Baik Island near the shores of Silam and kidnap the fish farm manager. The hostage was later taken to the Jolo island in the Sulu Archipelago. He was later freed on July with the help of Malaysian negotiators.
- 16 June – Two Abu Sayyaf gunmen raid a Malaysian fish farm and kidnapped a Chinese fish farm manager and one Filipino in Kampung Air Sapang, Kunak, Sabah. The Filipino hostage managed to escape while the fish farm manager has been taken away to Jolo. The fish farm manager was later released on 10 December.
- 27 June – Abdul Basit Usman, a bomb maker with links to Abu Sayyaf, reportedly is training others to carry out bombings in the Philippines.
- 28 July – Abu Sayyaf members ambush a civilian vehicle loaded with celebrators of Eid in Sulu, killing 21 people.
- 20 August – There are alleged reports that Abu Sayyaf members are training in Iraq under the Islamic State. Within this time, Isnilon Totoni Hapilon's group pledged allegiance to Abu Bakr al-Baghdadi and Islamic State in Iraq and the Levant followed by Radullan Sahiron. ISIS accepted their pledge.

== 2015 ==
- February – Military intelligence said that members of Jemaah Islamiyah are training Abu Sayyaf members in Sulu.
- 4 May – Abu Sayyaf members abducted 2 Coast Guard personnel and a barangay captain in Aliguay Island, a tourist destination in Zamboanga del Norte near Dapitan. The captain was found beheaded later in Sulu. The Coast Guard personnel later escaped when the group encountered a battalion of Marines and some members of the Scout Rangers, an encounter that left 15 ASG members dead.
- 15 May – Four Abu Sayyaf members abducted two people in a resort in Sandakan, Malaysia and brought them to Parang, Sulu.
- 21 September – Canadians Robert Hall, John Ridsdel, Norwegian Kjartan Sekkingstad and a Filipina woman named Maritess Flor were kidnapped by dozen armed men from the Holiday Oceanview Resort along Island Garden City of Samal, Davao del Norte. Hostage videos have been released, however they still remain imprisoned by the militants
- 9 November – One of the Malaysian kidnapped victims been released after ransom been paid.
- 17 November – While another Malaysian hostage was beheaded after ransom demands was not met.
- Late December – ISIL officially puts Abu Sayyaf as their direct affiliate.

== 2016 ==
- 14 January – A member of Abu Sayyaf who was believed to have been involved in the 2000 kidnappings over Sipadan was arrested by Philippine authorities.
- 6 February – Another Abu Sayyaf member who been alleged has link to the 2000 kidnappings over Sipadan and Davao Pearl Farm incidents was killed during a clash with Philippine police and military personnel who out to arrest him in Indanan, Sulu.
- 20 February – Three Abu Sayyaf members was killed during a clash with MNLF.
- 25 March – Three Abu Sayyaf members was killed during a clash with MILF.
- 26 March – Ten Indonesian sailors were abducted by Abu Sayyaf gunmen off the waters of Sulu. The 10 crew members were abducted from the Brahma 12 tugboat and the Anand 12 barge – carrying 7,000 tons of coal – in Sulu waters near the country's southernmost Tawi-Tawi province. On 2 May, the 10 Indonesian sailor hostages were released by their captors.
- 1 April – Four Malaysians aboard a tugboat from Manila were kidnapped when they arrived near the shore of Ligitan Island, while leaving other crews unharmed comprising three Myanmar nationals and two Indonesians. The four Malaysian hostages was later released after nearly two months in captivity.
- 8 April – An almost 10-hour long intense firefight happened in Tipo-Tipo, Basilan. Eighteen soldiers were killed while 52 government troops were wounded. Five Abu Sayyaf fighters were also killed in the encounter, including one foreign terrorist – a Moroccan national identified as Mohammad Khattad.
- 15 April – Two Indonesian tugboats from Cebu, namely Henry and Cristi with 10 passengers were attacked by Abu Sayyaf militants. Four passengers were kidnapped, while another five were safe. One of the passenger was injured after being shot but were later rescued by Malaysian Maritime Enforcement Agency when they arrived into the waters of Malaysia. The four were released on 11 May with the help of the Philippine government.
- 13 June – Canadian hostage, Robert Hall was executed after the P600 million ransom was not paid.
- 21 June – Seven Indonesian sailors aboard a tugboat that was passing through the Sulu Archipelago were kidnapped. One was able to escape his captors by running and swimming out to sea off Jolo island. While another hostage was released on 22 September.
- 10 July – Three Indonesians fishermen were kidnapped near the coast of Lahad Datu, Sabah, Malaysia. The three Indonesians fishermen were released on 17 September.
- 18 July – Five Malaysian sailors were abducted near the coast of Lahad Datu, Sabah, Malaysia.
- 3 August – One Indonesian sailor was kidnapped in the waters of Malaysia, leaving other two crews unharmed but the incident was only reported by victims on 5 August.
- 9 August – Four Abu Sayyaf members killed in clash with MNLF who are trying to release the Indonesian hostage.
- 10 September – Three Filipino fishermen was kidnapped in the shores of Pom Pom Island in Sabah, Malaysia.
- 27 September – One Malaysian boat-skipper was kidnapped from his trawler by seven armed Filipino militant before the group attacking another Indonesian trawler but no kidnapping were committed in the second incident. The boat-skipper was released on 1 October with no ransom been asked, along with three Indonesians hostages that was released in the same day.
- 21 October – Around 10 Abu Sayyaf militants attack a South Korean-bound vessel named MV Dongbang Gian and abduct a South Korean skipper and a Filipino crewman off Bongao, Tawi-Tawi.
- 6 November – A German woman tourist was shot to dead while her boyfriend been abducted by Abu Sayyaf militants from their yacht off Tanjong Luuk Pisuk in Sabah.
- 11 November – A Vietnamese vessel MV Royale 16 with 19 sailors on board was attacked by Abu Sayyaf near Basilan, abducting 6 sailors while injuring one and the remaining 13 sailors was released.
- 20 November – Two Indonesian fishermen was kidnapped by five Abu Sayyaf gunmen off Lahad Datu, Sabah, while Philippine military been informed to intercept the bandit.

== 2017 ==
- 31 January – An ASG bandit who was involved in 2000 Sipadan hostage crisis was arrested in Barangay Cawit, Zamboanga City.
- 7 February – Five suspected ASG bandits were killed in an armed clash with Philippine Marines on Capual Island near Omar, Sulu.
- 9 February – A joint operation by the PNP and AFP in Bongao, Tawi-Tawi resulted in the death of an ASG leader of the "Lucky 9" group along with another bandit.
- 14 February – A German national appeared in a video to say that the ASG threatened to kill him if P30 million ransom is not paid.
- 23 May 2017 – The Abu Sayyaf join forces with BIFF, AKP and the Maute Group to attack Marawi City as part of their aleigance to Islamic State. However their plan to take-over the city to make them as the wilayat of Islamic State are ultimately failed because they are completely wiped out by the combined forces of the Military Ground forces and police forces due to airstrikes and artillery bombardment.

== 2019 ==
- 27 January 2019 – their sub-faction the Ajang Ajang group are responsible for a dual suicide attacks on the Jolo cathedral as part of their retaliation against the Philippine government as well as their hatred of Christians as they declare a Jihad against Christians with the help of the Indonesian couples using the mobile phones, ammonium nitrate and IED's. However the mastermind of the attacks along with their comrades are recently arrested after a week of pursuit operations against the Ajang-ajang members, they are identified as Albaji Kisae Gadjali (alias Awag), Rajan Bakil Gadjali (alias Radjan), Kaisar Bakil Gadjali (alias Isal) and Salit Alih (alias Papong), Later the police filed murder charges against the suspects but other remaining 14 other suspects who still at large.
- 2 February 2019 – the Patikul, Sulu shootout. Five soldiers were killed and five others injured in a shootout in Patikul, Sulu, Philippines. Three terrorists were killed and 15 others were injured. The attack happened a week after a bombing that killed 20 people in a cathedral in the neighboring city of Jolo.
