= Siege of Lamitan =

Siege during the Moro conflict

- Part of the Moro conflict
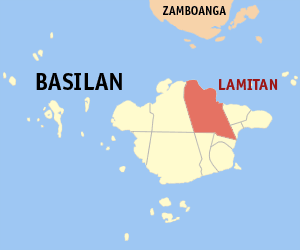
- The siege of Lamitan took place in the island province of Basilan
Date	2 June 2001
Location	Lamitan, Basilan, Philippines 6.6615°N 122.1065°E
Result	21 of 30 hostages rescued by government forces; Abu Sayyaf forces escape with remaining hostages

Belligerents
Philippine Army	Abu Sayyaf

Commanders and leaders
Romeo Dominguez; Jovenal Narcise; 2nd Lt. Kenneth Bulong †	Khadaffy Janjalani; Abu Suleiman

Units involved
103rd Infantry Brigade; 1st Scout Ranger Regiment	unknown

Strength
2,000 soldiers	60 fighters

Casualties and losses
2–6 killed in action 14–41 wounded in action	unspecified number killed
- several civilians killed and wounded, thousands flee the fighting

The siege of Lamitan took place on 2 June 2001 when members of the Islamic terrorist group Abu Sayyaf entered the city of Lamitan, one of two Christian settlements in the predominantly Muslim province of Basilan in the Philippines. They took over a church and a hospital and held priests, medical staff and patients hostage. Government forces surrounded the Muslim extremists, preventing their escape. However, the Abu Sayyaf group managed to break out of the cordon by using their hostages as human shields.

== Background ==
On 27 May 2001, members of the Abu Sayyaf group abducted 20 hostages, including three US citizens, from the Dos Palmas resort in Honda Bay, Palawan. The hostages were then taken across the Sulu Sea, back into Abu Sayyaf territory in Mindanao. The next day, then-President Gloria Macapagal Arroyo declared an "all-out-war" against the extremist group. Military operations geared towards pursuing the Abu Sayyaf and recovering the hostages were intensified.

== The siege ==
At 4:00 in the morning of 2 June 2001, the Abu Sayyaf entered Lamitan, Basilan with their hostages. They took over the Dr. Jose Torres Memorial Hospital and the St. Peter's Church compound. The group's leader, identified as Abu Suleiman, claimed that his unit was a "suicide squad" and that they were holding 200 hostages; government forces however, belied the claim and stated that the extremists only had twenty hostages under their control. Suleiman demanded that the military cease their pursuit operations, if not, he threatened to execute the hostages.

Government forces surrounded the hospital and church complex and called on the Abu Sayyaf to surrender. In order to keep the soldiers at bay, the extremists deployed snipers from the rooftops. Witnesses reported that helicopter gunships and soldiers responded with rocket and machine gun fire right into the compound. As the fighting progressed, four hostages were able to escape their captors.

As darkness fell, the Abu Sayyaf managed to escape from the compound, taking with them the remaining eleven of the original twenty hostages from Dos Palmas, and an additional five captives from the hospital, including nurse Ediborah Yap. Five other hostages managed to escape during the confusion of the night-time withdrawal, as the Abu Sayyaf covered their escape with a heavy volume of gunfire and used children and hostages as human shields.

== Aftermath ==
After the Lamitan siege, the Abu Sayyaf captured additional hostages, including plantation workers from Lantawan, Basilan. In subsequent months, some of the hostages were either freed or managed to escape. One of the three Americans, Guillermo Sobero, was beheaded. The remaining Americans, husband and wife Martin and Gracia Burnham, continued to be held by the Abu Sayyaf until 7 June 2002, when government troops finally caught up with the Muslim extremists. In the subsequent gun battle, Martin Burnham and nurse Ediborah Yap were killed. Gracia Burnham was rescued, although she sustained wounds.

In 2004, fourteen jailed Abu Sayyaf members, as well as three of their comrades who escaped from custody were sentenced to death for their part in the Lamitan siege. In 2014, another Abu Sayyaf member, Nasser Usman, was arrested for his role in the Lamitan siege as well as his participation in the 1995 Ipil massacre.

== Controversy ==
External videos
- A Filipino journalist's account of the Lamitan siege, YouTube video

A subsequent congressional investigation found "strong circumstantial evidence" of collusion between the Armed Forces of the Philippines and the Abu Sayyaf. It recommended that Jovenal Narcise, commander of the 103rd Infantry Brigade, the Philippine Army unit that responded to the Abu Sayyaf attack, be subjected to a court martial. Narcise and other military officers, however, were cleared of any liability for the Abu Sayyaf's escape during a pre-trial investigation.

The parish priest of Lamitan, Cirilo Nacorda, himself a victim of kidnapping before by the Abu Sayyaf, claimed that the military commanders connived with the Abu Sayyaf, allowing the extremists to escape in exchange for part of the ransom paid for the freedom of some of the Dos Palmas hostages.

Narcise and his immediate superior, commander of the 1st Infantry Division Romeo Dominguez, were relieved from their posts.

== See also ==
- Dos Palmas kidnappings
