= Isnilon Hapilon =

Philippine Moro terrorist (1968–2017)

- Image of Isnilon Hapilon used in a US government poster from 2006
- Born: Isnilon Totoni Hapilon; March 10, 1968; Maluso, Basilan, Philippines
- Died: October 16, 2017 (aged 49); Marawi, Lanao del Sur, Philippines
- Military career
- Allegiance: Moro National Liberation Front (1985–1994); Abu Sayyaf (1994–2017)
- Conflicts: Moro conflict: Battle of Tipo-Tipo; Siege of Marawi †

Isnilon Totoni Hapilon (March 10, 1968 – October 16, 2017), also known by the nom de guerre Abu Abdullah al-Filipini, (Note: Arabic: أبو عبد الله الفلبيني, lit. 'Father of Abdullah, the Filipino') was a Filipino Islamist militant affiliated with IS. He was formerly leader of Abu Sayyaf Group, before its battalions pledged their allegiance to Abu Bakr al-Baghdadi. An April 2016 issue of IS's weekly newsletter Al-Naba said that Hapilon had been appointed as "emir of all Islamic State forces in the Philippines".

In the early morning of October 16, 2017, he was killed by the Philippine Army in the Battle of Marawi, along with Omar Maute.

== Early life ==
According to the Federal Bureau of Investigation and the United States Department of State Rewards for Justice Program, Isnilon Totoni Hapilon was born on March 18, 1966, in Lantawan, Basilan, Philippines. However, his school transcripts indicate his birthdate as March 10, 1968, and his birthplace as Maluso, Basilan. His listed parent/guardian is Haridja Hapilon, a housekeeper. According to the Philippine Daily Inquirer, he had five siblings, and his father was a village imam named Hapilon Totoni.

Hapilon started elementary school in 1978, at the age of 10, enrolling at Maluso Central Elementary School. He had a perfect attendance from the first to the fifth grade, but had 28 days of absence and six days of tardiness in his sixth grade claiming that he had to "run errands"; he finished in 1984 with an average grade of 78%. He then enrolled at Basilan National High School, but his transcript ends with his first year even though he was eligible to proceed to second year.

In an interview with the Philippine Daily Inquirer, former Lantawan mayor Tahira Ismael, Hapilon's madrasa classmate, claimed that Hapilon "performed poorly in academics".

The FBI Most Wanted Terrorists list, and some newspapers including the Philippine Daily Inquirer, The Straits Times, and The Philippine Star, reported that Hapilon earned an engineering degree from the University of the Philippines. On May 31, 2017, the University of the Philippines issued a statement refuting the earlier reports, declaring that they have no record of an alumnus or former student named Isnilon Hapilon.

To help identify Hapilon, the US government described his personality as "likable by peers; proud and confident in his abilities" and his physique as "skinny; may have chin hair and slight mustache", being 5 ft. 5 in (1.65 m) to 5 ft. 7 in (1.70 m) tall and weighing around 120 lb (54 kg).

According to the FBI, he used a number of aliases including Abu Musab, Sol, Abu Tuan, Esnilon, and Salahuddin. The Rewards for Justice Program lists further aliases including Abubakar Hapilon, Amah Hi Omar, Abu Omar, Abubakar, and Bakkal. He spoke Tausug, Tagalog, Yakan, and Arabic, as well as English. He may have traveled to Saudi Arabia and Malaysia in the past.

== Militant activity ==
=== Moro National Liberation Front ===
Hapilon joined the Moro National Liberation Front (MNLF) in 1985 and traveled between Sulu and Basilan. While he was with the rebel group, he took up Arabic and madrasa education again and became the spokesperson of Commander Barahama Sali in 1992. A strong military offensive in 1994 and the death of Commander Sali forced them to flee to Sampinit Complex in Sumisip, where he met Abdurajak Abubakar Janjalani.

=== Abu Sayyaf ===
Disaffected with the MNLF while in hiding in Sampinit, Hapilon joined the Abu Sayyaf group led by Abdurajak Abubakar Janjalani, who also became his religious mentor. He eventually rose through the ranks of Abu Sayyaf, becoming one of the group's leaders. (Note: Nur Misuari, leader of the MNLF, signed a peace agreement with the Philippine government in 1996. Abdurajik Abubakar Janjalani, a former MNLF fighter, recruited other disappointed radical MNLF members to form the Abu Sayyaf, which aims to establish an independent Islamic state instead of an autonomous region.)

In June 2002, Hapilon and four other Abu Sayyaf leaders—Khadaffy Janjalani, Hamsiraji Marusi Sali, Aldam Tilao, and Jainal Antel Sali, Jr.—were indicted in absentia by the United States government for their role in the 2000 Dos Palmas kidnappings of seventeen Filipinos and three Americans, and the eventual beheading of one of the Americans, Guillermo Sobero. The August 2000 kidnapping of Jeffrey Schilling, and the deaths of two hostages—American missionary Martin Burnham and Filipino nurse Ediborah Yap—were also cited in the indictment.

Hapilon was the only one of the five indicted still alive by 2017. On February 24, 2006, he was added to the FBI's Most Wanted Terrorists list, along with Janjalani and Jainal Sali, Jr. The Rewards For Justice Program of the US State Department offered up to US$5 million (approx. 256 million Philippine pesos at the time of his death) for information leading to his capture.

In July 2002, Philippine authorities raided Hapilon's suspected hideout in Zamboanga City with the intention of arresting him. However, he managed to escape prior to their arrival.

In May 2008, Hapilon was shot in the hand during a military operation in Jolo. His son, Tabari, also an Abu Sayyaf fighter, was fatally wounded.

Hapilon was wounded in April 2013, in a military offensive that killed eight other Islamist militants in Tipo-Tipo, Basilan. Hapilon sustained a "slight wound" on the head during the raid, but his followers managed to drag him off safely before the soldiers could seize control of their base. There were United States intelligence reports claiming he may have suffered a stroke at some point.

=== Islamic State in the Philippines ===
On July 23, 2014, a video of Hapilon along with other masked men was uploaded to YouTube, where they swore their allegiance to Abu Bakr al-Baghdadi, the leader of IS. (Note: Abu Sayyaf used to be affiliated with al-Qaeda: Abu Sayyaf founder Abdurajak Abubakar Janjalani met Osama bin Laden, the founder of al-Qaeda, during the Soviet–Afghan War (1979–89). Abu Sayyaf was then funded by al-Qaeda through Mohammad Jamal Khalifa, a brother-in-law to bin Laden. Islamic State, another militant group, was affiliated with al-Qaeda from October 2004 to February 2014, when al-Qaeda publicly disavowed any relations with Islamic State after an eight-month power struggle. Other armed Islamist groups previously affiliated with al-Qaeda, including the Abu Sayyaf, eventually pledged allegiance to Islamic State. This resulted in Islamic State becoming more powerful than al-Qaeda.)

On April 9, 2016, Hapilon and Basilan-based commander Furuji Indama led 150 Abu Sayyaf fighters on an attack against government forces in Tipo-Tipo, Basilan. At least eighteen soldiers were killed and more than fifty other soldiers were wounded in the ten-hour shootout. Hapilon's son, Ubaida, was among the five Abu Sayyaf fighters killed in the encounter. Additional government forces were deployed to capture or kill Hapilon.

A June 21, 2016, video by IS entitled "The Solid Structure" recognized Hapilon as the mujahid authorized to lead the jihadists of the Islamic State in the Philippines, and designated him as the emir for Southeast Asia. The video also called on Southeast Asian Islamist militants to travel to the Philippines and engage in jihad.

As of January 2017, IS acknowledged him as their member. He was known to be in Butig, Lanao del Sur for rectifying the Maute group and joining Abu Sayyaf to establish Islamic State in the Philippines. He was later promoted as emir of the "East Asia Province".

In May 2017, during a joint operation of the Armed Forces of the Philippines and the Philippine National Police to capture Hapilon, militants of the Maute group launched an attack on Marawi and it was reported that armed militants had occupied several parts of the city. As of that time, Hapilon was in Marawi, alongside his supporters. He was believed to be injured.

In October 16, Isnilon and Omar Maute were killed in a military operation in Marawi, which rescued 17 hostages. The deaths were confirmed by Defense Secretary Delfin Lorenzana. Lorenzana announced on October 21 that the FBI confirmed that the DNA sample of a body recovered by AFP matched that of Hapilon. This was confirmed by Lamont Siller, the FBI's legal attaché at the Embassy of the United States, Manila as well as the embassy's spokeswoman Molly Koscina.
