= MV SuperFerry 14 =

Philippine ferry attacked by Abu Sayyaf in 2004

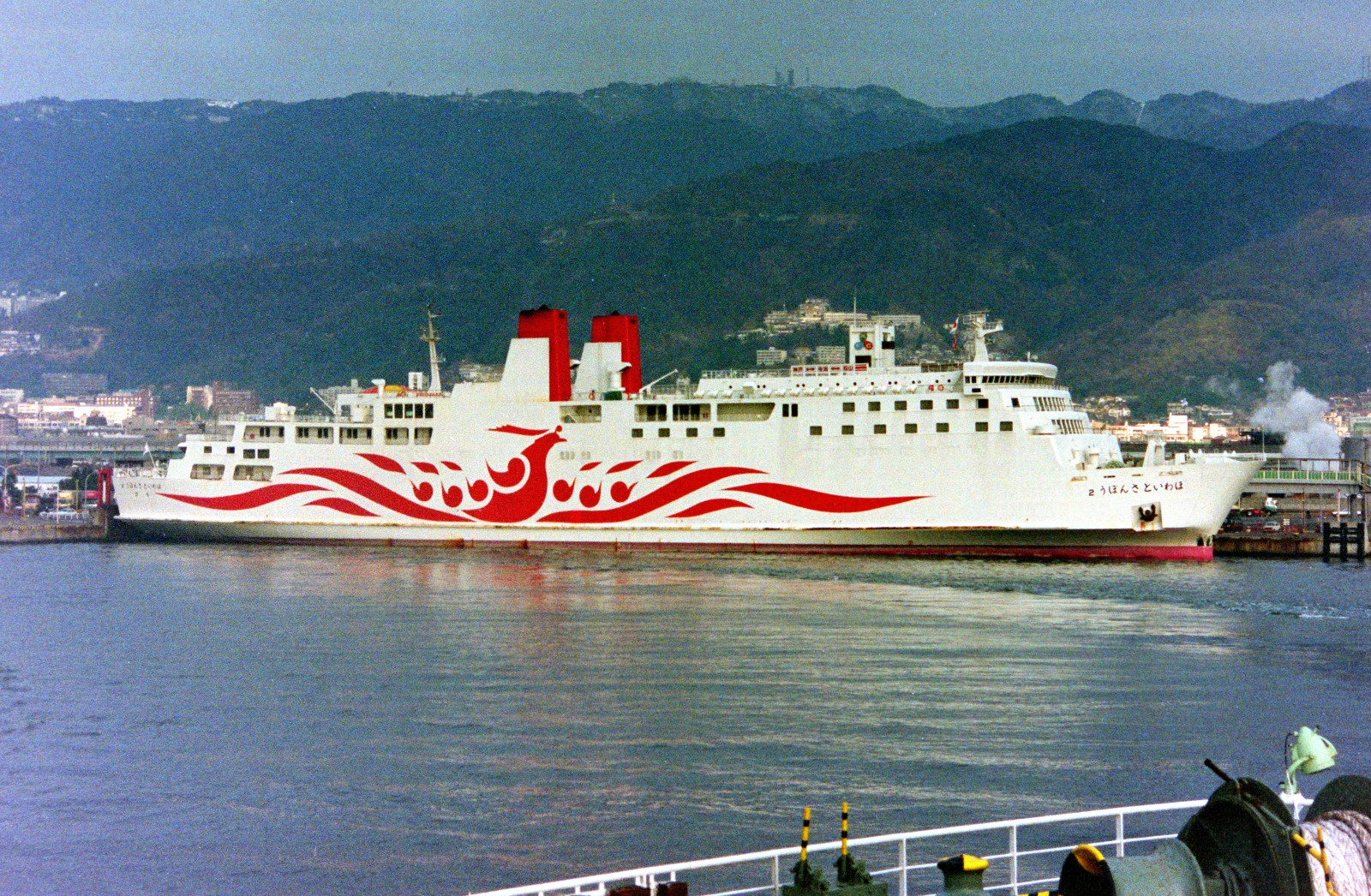
- MV SuperFerry 14 as White Sanpo 2 in 1987

History

Japan
- Name: White Sanpo 2
- Owner: 1981–1997: Sanpo Kaiun K.K.; 1997–2000: Ehime Hanshin Ferry
- Operator: 1981–1997: Sanpo Kaiun K.K.; 1997–2000: Ehime Hanshin Ferry
- Port of registry: Imabari, Japan
- Route: Matsuyama – Imabari – Kobe
- Builder: Hayashikane Shipbuilding & Engineering Company, Shimonoseki, Japan
- Yard number: 1240
- Launched: February 1981
- Maiden voyage: June 1981
- In service: 1981–2000
- Out of service: July 10, 2000
- Identification: Call sign: DUNB4; IMO number: 8004210
- Fate: Sold to WG&A Philippines Inc.

Philippines
- Name: MV SuperFerry 14
- Owner: WG&A Philippines Inc.
- Operator: WG&A SuperFerry
- Port of registry: Manila, Philippines
- Route: Manila - Bacolod - Iloilo – Cagayan de Oro (2004)
- Launched: October 15, 2000
- Maiden voyage: 2000
- In service: 2000–2004
- Out of service: February 27, 2004
- Fate: Destroyed by fire as a result of a terrorist attack by Abu Sayyaf on February 27, 2004, off the coast of Corregidor

General characteristics
- Class & type: ROPAX Ferry
- Tonnage: 10,181.77 GT
- Length: 155.6
- Beam: 23.6 m
- Draft: 5.8 m
- Installed power: dual SEMT Pielstick diesel marine engines; 23,400 hp (combined)
- Propulsion: dual propellers
- Speed: 24 knots (max)
- Capacity: 1,747 passengers

SuperFerry 14 bombing
- Manila Bay (Philippines)
- Location: Near El Fraile or Corregidor Island, Manila Bay, Philippines
- Date: February 26, 2004; 22 years ago c. 11:00 p.m. (PHT, UTC+08:00)
- Target: MV SuperFerry 14
- Attack type: Bombing, mass murder, terrorism
- Weapon: TNT bomb
- Deaths: 116-194
- Injuries: 300-320
- Perpetrators: Abu Sayyaf: Redondo Cain Dellosa (bomber); Ruben Lavilla, Jr., Khadaffy Janjalani, and Abu Sulaiman (alleged masterminds)
- Motive: Islamic extremism; Protection racket

MV SuperFerry 14 was a Philippine registered roll-on/roll-off (ro-ro) ferry that was attacked on February 26, 2004 by terrorist group Abu Sayyaf that resulted in the destruction and sinking of the ferry and the deaths of 116 people in the Philippines' deadliest terrorist attack. Six children less than five years old, and nine children between six and 16 years of age were among the dead or missing, including six students on a championship team sent by schools in northern Mindanao to compete in a journalism contest.

== Background ==
MV SuperFerry 14 was built by Hayashikane Shipbuilding and Engineering Company Ltd. in Shimonoseki, Japan in February 1981 as the White Sanpo 2 (Japanese: ほわいとさんぽう2) for the Japanese company Sanpo Kaiun K.K. (Japanese: 三宝海運) and was transferred to Ehime Hanshin Ferry (Japanese: 愛媛阪神フェリー) in 1997. She had three passenger decks and a single car deck which was accessible by ramps at the bow and the stern, a common feature of a RoPax Ferry. She had extensive passenger facilities and had a luxurious interior. She featured a twin QE2 inspired funnel. She was painted with a giant phoenix on the side of the hull.

She was 155.6 meters long, 23.6 meters wide, and had a depth of 13.0 meters. She had a gross tonnage of 10,181.77. She was eventually sold to WG&A in the year 2000 where she was renamed the MV SuperFerry 14. She was inaugurated in Bacolod City on October 2000, coinciding with the MassKara Festival. WG&A promoted the ship as a "festival ship" during its entry into service. At the time of her service in the Philippines, her interior was more opulent than what is normally found in a domestic ferry. WG&A marketed her differently to distinguish herself from other ferries in her class.

== Bombing ==
On the night of February 26, the 10,192-ton ferry sailed out of Manila for Cagayan de Oro via Bacolod and Iloilo City with 899 recorded passengers and crew aboard. A television set containing a 3.6-kilogram (7.9 lb) TNT bomb had been placed on board in the lower, more-crowded decks.

An hour after at 11 p.m. sailing just off either El Fraile or Corregidor Island an explosion tore through the vessel, starting a fire that engulfed the ship. Captain Ceferino Manzo issued the order to abandon ship at about 1:30 a.m., February 27. As the fire spread across the vessel most of the survivors jumped into the sea or boarded rescue boats. By February 29, officials had accounted for 565 of the 744 recorded passengers and all but two of the 155 crew members.

In the days following the blast, the recovery of the dead and missing, calculated at around 180 on February 29, was slow. Officials stated the missing may have been trapped inside the blazing ferry, drowned in Manila Bay and may have been picked up by fishing boats. The recovery of bodies took several months, with only four bodies recovered by Coast Guard divers from the half-submerged ferry in the first week, despite it having been towed to shallower waters near Mariveles, west of Manila. At least another 12 bodies, some displaying blast injuries, were recovered by divers in the days up until the 7th. Eventually, 63 bodies were recovered while another 53 remained missing, presumed dead.

== Investigation ==
Despite claims from various terrorist groups, the blast was initially thought to have been an accident, caused by a gas explosion. Sabotage was initially ruled out.

However, at the marine board of inquiry hearing in late March 2004, a safety supervisor with the ship's owner, WG&A, testified that about 150 survivors told him an explosion took place in the tourist section around the general area of bunk 51. The Captain of the ferry, Ceferino Manzo, testified in the same hearing that the entire tourist section was engulfed in "thick black smoke that smelled like gunpowder."

After divers righted the ferry, five months after it sank, they found evidence of a bomb blast. A man named Redondo Cain Dellosa, a Rajah Sulaiman Movement member, confessed to planting a bomb, triggered by a timing device, on board for the Abu Sayyaf group. He held a ticket on the ferry for bunk 51B, where the bomb was placed, and disembarked before the ship's departure.

President Gloria Macapagal Arroyo announced on October 11, 2004, that investigators had concluded that the explosion had been caused by a bomb. She said six suspects had been arrested in connection with the bombing and that the masterminds, Khadaffy Janjalani and Abu Sulaiman, were still at large. It was believed that Abu Sayyaf bombed Superferry 14 because the company that owned it, WG&A, did not comply with a letter demanding $1 million in protection money. The vessel was later raised and sold for scrap.

== Arrest and deportation ==
Ruben Omar Pestano Lavilla, Jr., a listed terrorist of U.S. State Department, and founder of Philippine terror group Rajah Sulaiman Movement, was arrested in Bahrain on July 24, 2008. Anti-Terrorism Council Chairman Eduardo Ermita announced that Lavilla, the alleged mastermind of the Superferry 14 bombing, was deported from Bahrain to the Philippines on August 30. Included in the sanctioned list of the United Nations Security Council, the RSM leader was also implicated in the February 14, 2005 bombings at Glorietta, and has pending murder case before the Makati Regional Trial Court for the bombings.

== See also ==
- SuperFerry
- Rizal Day bombings
- 2016 Davao City bombing
- List of terrorist incidents in 2004
- List of maritime disasters in the Philippines
