= Abu Sayyaf =

Jihadist militant group in the Philippines

Islamic State – East Asia Province
- The logo of ISIL, which was adopted by Abu Sayyaf
- Leaders: Abdurajak Abubakar Janjalani (KIA); Khadaffy Janjalani (KIA); Abu Sabaya (KIA); Jainal Antel Sali Jr. (KIA); Albader Parad (KIA); Isnilon Hapilon (KIA); Mahmur Japuri (KIA); Hajan Sawadjaan (KIA); Radullan Sahiron
- Dates active: 1991–present
- Headquarters: Jolo, Sulu, Philippines
- Ideology: Islamic Statism
- Size: 50 members (December 2025, est. by the AFP)
- Part of: Islamic State
- Wars: Moro conflict, Cross border attacks in Sabah, war on terror, South Thailand insurgency, Philippine drug war, Siege of Marawi

Abu Sayyaf (ASG), (Note: /ˈɑːbuː sɑːˈjɑːf/; Arabic: جماعة أبو سياف, romanized: Jamāʿat Abū Sayyāf; Filipino: Grupong Abu Sayyaf) officially as the Islamic State – East Asia Province, (Note: Arabic: ولاية شرق آسيا, romanized: Wilāyat Šārq Āsiyā) is a Jihadist militant group, pirate group and former province of the Islamic State that follows the Wahhabi doctrine of Sunni Islam. It is based in and around Jolo and Basilan islands in the southwestern part of the Philippines, where Moro groups had been engaged in an insurgency seeking to create a Moro nation state. The group was responsible for the Philippines' deadliest terrorist attack, the bombing of the MV Superferry 14 which killed 116 people in 2004. The name of the group is derived from Arabic abu (أبو; "father of"), and sayyaf (سيّاف; "swordsmith"). As of April 2023, the group was estimated to have about 20 members, down from 1,250 in 2000.

The group carries out bombings, kidnappings, assassinations and extortion as their strategy. It has been involved in criminal activities, including rape, child sexual assault, forced marriage, drive-by shootings and drug trafficking. The goals of the group "appear to have alternated over time between criminal objectives and a more ideological intent".

The group is designated a terrorist group by Australia, Canada, Indonesia, Japan, Malaysia, the Philippines, the United Arab Emirates, the United Kingdom and the United States. From January 15, 2002, to February 24, 2015.

The group was founded and led by Abdurajak Abubakar Janjalani, until his death in 1998. His younger brother Khadaffy Janjalani took over until he died in 2006. On July 23, 2014, Isnilon Hapilon, one of the group's leaders, swore an oath of loyalty to Abu Bakr al-Baghdadi, the leader of the Islamic State (IS) officially aligning the group with the global jihadist movement.

Since the 'All-Out-War' directive was issued in 2019 during the term of President Rodrigo Duterte over continuous attacks perpetrated by Abu Sayyaf towards civilians, especially after the Jolo Cathedral bombings, this has greatly diminished the terror group, with many of their leaders and members being killed and arrested, while former followers who returned to normal lives were reintegrated into society after serving their time in prison and undergoing rehabilitation. On March 22, 2024, the AFP's Western Mindanao Command (WESTMINCOM) announced that the Abu Sayyaf group had been dismantled. The group later resurfaced in 2026.

== Background and history ==
In the early 1970s, the Moro National Liberation Front (MNLF) was the main Muslim rebel group fighting in Basilan and Mindanao. Abdurajak Abubakar Janjalani, the older brother of Khadaffy Janjalani, had been a teacher from Basilan, who studied Islamic theology and Arabic in Libya, Syria and Saudi Arabia during the 1980s. Abdurajak went to Afghanistan to fight against the Soviet Union and the Afghan government during the Soviet–Afghan War. During that period, he was alleged to have met Osama bin Laden and been given $6 million to establish a more Islamic group drawn from the MNLF. Both Abdurajak Abubakar and Khadaffy were natives of Isabela City, one of the poorest cities of the Philippines and capital of Basilan.

=== Abdurajak Abubakar Janjalani leadership (1989–1998) ===
In the early 1990s, the MNLF moderated into governing the Autonomous Region in Muslim Mindanao, becoming the ruling government in majority Muslim areas of Mindanao in 1996. When Abdurajak returned to Basilan in 1990, he gathered radical members of the old MNLF who wanted to resume armed struggle and in 1991 established the Abu Sayyaf. Janjalani was funded by a Saudi Islamist, Mohammed Jamal Khalifa, who came to the Philippines in 1987 or 1988 and was head of the Philippine branch of the International Islamic Relief Organization foundation. A defector from Abu Sayyaf told Filipino authorities, "The IIRO was behind the construction of Mosques, school buildings, and other livelihood projects" but only "in areas penetrated, highly influenced and controlled by the Abu Sayyaf". According to the defector, "Only 10 to 30% of the foreign funding goes to the legitimate relief and livelihood projects and the rest go to terrorist operations". Khalifa married a local woman, Alice "Jameelah" Yabo.

By 1995, Abu Sayyaf was active in large-scale bombings and attacks. The first attack was the assault on the town of Ipil, Zamboanga del Sur in April 1995. This year marked the escape of 20-year-old Khadaffy Janjalani from Camp Crame in Manila along with another member named Jovenal Bruno. On December 18, 1998, Abdurajak was killed in a gun battle with the Philippine National Police in Basilan. He was thought to have been about 39.

The death of Aburajak marked a turning point in Abu Sayyaf operations. The group shifted to kidnappings, murders, and robberies, under his younger brother Khadaffy. The Sulu Archipelago experienced some of the fiercest fights between government troops and Abu Sayyaf through the early 1990s. It was reported that Abu Sayyaf began expanding into neighboring Malaysia and Indonesia by that time.

=== Khadaffy Janjalani leadership (1999–2007) ===
Until his death in a gun battle on September 4, 2006, Khaddafy Janjalani was considered the nominal leader of the group by the Armed Forces of the Philippines. Then-23-year-old Khadaffy took leadership of one of Abu Sayyaf's factions in an internecine struggle. He then worked to consolidate his leadership, causing the group to appear inactive for a period. After his leadership was secured, Abu Sayyaf began a new strategy, taking hostages. The group's motive for the kidnapping became more financial than religious during this period, according to locals. Hostage money probably provides the group's financing.

Abu Sayyaf expanded its operations to Malaysia in 2000, when it abducted foreigners from two resorts. This action was condemned by most Islamic leaders. It was responsible for the kidnapping and murder of more than 30 foreigners and Christian clerics and workers, including Martin and Gracia Burnham. An influential commander named Abu Sabaya was killed at sea in June 2002 while trying to evade local forces. His death was considered a crucial turning point for the group, as the number of operatives working for Abu Sayyaf sharply decreased from 1,100 in 2001 to 450 in late 2002, and had since been stagnant for the next ten years.

On August 2, 2001 Abu Sayyaf bandits attacked a predominantly Christian village named "Balobo" in the Island of Basilan in which they abducted 32 people, 11 of which they executed

Ghalib Andang, alias Commander Robot, one of the group's leaders, was captured in Sulu in December 2003. On 14 March 2005, inmates from the Abu Sayyaf Group rioted inside Camp Bagong Diwa in Taguig in an apparent escape attempt and barricaded the second floor of the building, leading to a standoff which ended the next day when government forces stormed the prison. 24 Abu Sayyaf members, including Commanders Robot, Kosovo (Alhamser Limbong) and Global (Nadjmi Sabdullah), were killed, along with three prison guards and a police officer.

An explosion at a military base in Jolo, on February 18, 2006, was blamed on the group by Brig. General Alexander Aleo. Khadaffy was indicted in the United States District Court for the District of Columbia for his alleged involvement in terrorist attacks, including hostage-taking and murder, against United States nationals and other foreign nationals. Consequently, on February 24, 2006, Khadaffy was among six fugitives in the second and most recent group of indicted fugitives to be added to the FBI Most Wanted Terrorists list along with two fellow members, Isnilon Totoni Hapilon and Jainal Antel Sali Jr.

On December 13, 2006, it was reported that Abu Sayyaf members may have been planning attacks during the Association of Southeast Asian Nations (ASEAN) summit in the Philippines. The group was reported to have trained alongside Jemaah Islamiyah militants. The plot was reported to have involved detonating a car bomb in Cebu City where the summit was to take place. On December 27, the Philippine military reported that Khaddafi's remains had been recovered near Patikul, in Jolo and that DNA tests had been ordered to confirm the discovery. He was allegedly shot in the neck in an encounter with government troops in September on Luba Hills in Patikul, Sulu.

Throughout 2000 to 2007, The Abu Sayyaf group led attacks on civilians resulting in over 1,700 casualties

=== 2010–present ===
In a video published in the summer of 2014, senior Abu Sayyaf leader Isnilon Hapilon and other masked men swore their allegiance or "bay'ah" to Abu Bakr al-Baghdadi, the "Islamic State" (IS) caliph. "We pledge to obey him on anything which our hearts desire or not and to value him more than anyone else. We will not take any emir (leader) other than him unless we see in him any obvious act of disbelief that could be questioned by Allah in the hereafter." For many years prior to this, Islamic State's competitor, al-Qaeda, had the support of Abu Sayyaf "through various connections". Observers were skeptical about whether the pledge would lead to Abu Sayyaf becoming an ISIS outpost in Southeast Asia, or was simply a way for the group to take advantage of the newer group's international publicity.

In May 2017, Hapilon and other members of Abu Sayyaf joined the Islamic extremist Maute Group based in Lanao del Sur during their attempt to seize control of Marawi City, sparking the Battle of Marawi which destroyed much of the city and ended with his killing, along with that of Maute leader Omar Maute by government forces in October.

In August 2020, MNLF chairman Nur Misuari turned in Abu Sayyaf sub-commander Anduljihad "Idang" Susukan to the Philippine National Police four months after Susukan surrendered to Misuari in Davao City.

By 2022, the Islamic State's East Asia Province had absorbed pro-IS groups in Indonesia and a few militants in Thailand. In the latter country, alleged IS members have become involved in the South Thailand insurgency, claiming their first attack in Pattani on April 15, 2022.

In 2023, the government declared that Sulu province was free of Abu Sayyaf militants. In December, ISIS declared responsibility for the deadly Mindanao State University bombing.

On March 22, 2024, the Philippines announced that Abu Sayyaf had been "fully dismantled", bringing an end to the decades-long jihadist insurgency. However, the group is still operating and attacking Philippine security forces.

On April 24, 2024, Abu Sayyaf militants engaged in a brief shootout with police officers in Hadji Mohammad Ajul, Basilan, leaving at least one militant dead. After April 2024, the group was inactive following a further wave of continuous military operations.

On July 6, 2024, President Bongbong Marcos commended the joint efforts and sacrifices that resulted in the weakening of Abu Sayyaf during his visit to the headquarters of the 11th Infantry Division (ID) at Camp Teodulfo Bautista in Jolo, Sulu.

On December 23, 2024, three members of the Intelligence Service of the Armed Forces of the Philippines (ISAFP) were killed in an ambush by unidentified gunmen in Basilan. Despite the attack, Basilan province was declared free from Abu Sayyaf militants after the last remaining members surrendered to the authorities on December 26, 2024.

The Philippine government is currently working continuously to revitalize and rejuvenate the dark image of former Abu Sayyaf strongholds with the restoration of peace and increased security with social and economic development for the inhabitants.

On January 30, 2026, the Islamic State – East Asia Province claimed an ambush that killed 4 soldiers. This is the groups first claimed attack since October 2024. In 2026, MEMRI reported that the Islamic State – East Asia Province and the Islamic State – Turkey Province had been demoted from provincial status, with the process taking place between 2024 and 2026.

== Supporters and funding ==
Abdurajak Abubakar Janjalani's first recruits were soldiers of the MNLF and the Moro Islamic Liberation Front (MILF). However, both MNLF and MILF deny links with Abu Sayyaf. Both officially distanced themselves because of its attacks on civilians and its supposed profiteering. The Philippine military, however, has claimed that elements of both groups provided support to Abu Sayyaf. The group was originally not thought to receive funding from outside sources, but intelligence reports from the United States, Indonesia and Australia found intermittent ties to the Indonesian Jemaah Islamiyah terrorist group, and the Philippine government considers the Abu Sayyaf to be part of Jemaah Islamiyah. The government noted that initial funding for ASG came from al-Qaeda through the brother-in-law of Osama bin Laden, Mohammed Jamal Khalifa.

Al-Qaeda-affiliated terrorist Ramzi Yousef operated in the Philippines in the mid-1990s and trained Abu Sayyaf soldiers. The 2002 edition of the United States Department's Patterns of Global Terrorism mentions links to Al-Qaeda. Continuing ties to Islamist groups in the Middle East indicate that al-Qaeda may be continuing support. As of mid-2005, Jemaah Islamiyah personnel reportedly had trained about 60 Abu Sayyaf cadres in bomb assembling and detonations.

=== Funding ===
The group obtained most of its financing through kidnap ransom and extortion. One report estimated its revenues from ransom payments in 2000 were between $10 and $25 million. According to the State Department, it may receive funding from radical Islamic benefactors in the Middle East and South Asia. It was reported that Libya facilitated ransom payments to Abu Sayyaf. It was also suggested that Libyan money could possibly be channeled to Abu Sayyaf. Russian intelligence agencies connected with Victor Bout's planes reportedly provided Abu Sayyaf with arms. In 2014 and since, kidnapping for ransom has been the primary means of funding.

The chart below collects events that Abu Sayyaf received ransoms or payments that are euphemistically called "board and lodgings". More detailed information can be seen in the Timeline of Abu Sayyaf attacks.

Event	Hostage(s) released	Ransom demanded ($US)	Amount paid ($US)
2011 Kidnapping of an Australian	Warren Rodwell (2013)	$2 million	$100,000
2014 kidnapping of two Germans	Both (2014)	$5.6 million for Dr. Stefan Viktor Okonek and Henrike Dielen	$5,600,000
2015 Samal Island kidnappings	Kjartan Sekkingstad (2016)	$16 million for Canadians Robert Hall and John Ridsdel (both beheaded), and Kjartan Sekkingstad (Norway)	$638,000
2015 kidnapping of an Italian	Rolando del Torchio (2016)	$650,000 (P29 million)	$650,000
2016 kidnapping of Indonesian sailors	All (2016)	$1 million for ten Indonesian crew on the tugboat Brahma 12 and barge Anand 12	$1,000,000
2016 kidnapping of Malaysian sailors	All (2016)	$3 million for Wong Teck Kang, Teck Chii, Lau Jung Hien and Wong Hung Sing	$3,000,000

== Motivation, beliefs, targets ==
Filipino Islamist guerrillas such as Abu Sayyaf have been described as "rooted in a distinct class made up of closely-knit networks built through the marriage of important families through socioeconomic backgrounds and family structures", according to Michael Buehler. This tight-knit, familial structure provides resilience but also limits their growth. Commander of the Western Mindanao Command Lieutenant General Rustico Guerrero, describes Abu Sayyaf as "a local group with a local agenda". Two kidnapping victims, (Martin and Gracia Burnham) who were kept in captivity by ASG for over a year, "gently engaged their captors in theological discussion" and found Abu Sayyaf fighters to be unfamiliar with the Qur'an. They had only "a sketchy" notion of Islam, which they saw as "a set of behavioural rules, to be violated when it suited them", according to author Mark Bowden. As "holy warriors, they were justified in kidnapping, killing and stealing. Having sex with women captives was justified by their claiming them as "wives".

Unlike MILF and MNLF, the group is not recognised by the Organization of Islamic Cooperation, and according to author Robert East, was seen as "nothing more than a criminal operation" at least prior to 2001. A Center for Strategic and International Studies report by Jack Fellman notes the political rather than religious motivation of ASG. He quotes Khadaffy's statement that his brother was right to split from MNLF because "up to now, nothing came out" of attempts to gain more autonomy for Moro Muslims. This suggests, Fellman believes, that ASG "is merely the latest, albeit most violent, iteration of Moro political dissatisfaction that has existed for the last several decades".

Some Abu Sayyaf members are also "shabu" (methamphetamine) users as described by surviving hostages who saw Abu Sayyaf members taking shabu as well from military findings who found drug packets in many of the abandoned Abu Sayyaf nests that justified their motivation as extreme criminals and terrorists as their state of mind were under the influence of drugs rather than being consciously fighting for the betterment of their region as well rights to living under their minority religion without any discrimination from the majority Filipinos. Its spokesman known as Abu Rami (d. 2017) appeared to lack knowledge of the activities of other members, as the group had apparently separated into many small groups with their own leaders.

=== Targets ===
Most Abu Sayyaf victims have been Filipinos; however, in recent years (especially from 2011 onwards), Australian, British, Canadian, Chinese, Dutch, French, German, Indonesian, Japanese, Korean, Malaysian, Norwegian, Swiss and Vietnamese nationals have been kidnapped or attacked.

Previously, Americans were particularly targeted. An unnamed ASG spokesman allegedly stated, "We have been trying hard to get an American because they may think we are afraid of them". He added, "We want to fight the American people."

In 1993, Abu Sayyaf kidnapped an American Christian Bible translator Charles Walton, who served as a linguist for SIL Global. In 2000, Abu Sayyaf captured an American Muslim and demanded that the United States release Sheikh Omar Abdel Rahman and Ramzi Yousef, who were jailed for their involvement in the 1993 World Trade Center bombing in New York City.

Between March 2016 – July 2017, the majority of Abu Sayyaf kidnap for ransom operations shifted to the high seas. Seventeen ships were boarded and some sixty-five hostages from six countries were taken. In total, thirty hostages have been released (usually after a ransom was paid), seven escaped, three were rescued by Philippine security forces, and four were executed. Two others were killed during the attacks while eight seamen escaped during the shipjackings. An additional forty seamen were not taken hostage.

== Crimes and terrorism ==
Abu Sayyaf has carried out numerous bombings, kidnappings, assassinations, and extortion activities. These include the 2000 Sipadan kidnappings, the 2001 Dos Palmas kidnappings and the 2004 SuperFerry 14 bombing.

=== Kidnappings ===
Although the group has engaged in kidnapping hostages to be exchanged for ransom for many years, this means of funding grew dramatically beginning in 2014, providing funds for the group's rapid growth.

==== In the Philippines ====
===== Journalists abducted since 2000 =====
ABS-CBN's Newsbreak reported that Abu Sayyaf abducted at least 20 journalists from 2000 to 2008 (mostly foreign journalists). All of them were eventually released upon payment of ransom.

- GMA-7 television reporter Susan Enriquez (April 2000, Basilan, a few days);
- 10 Foreign journalists (7 German, 1 French, 1 Australian and 1 Danish, in May 2000, Jolo, for 10 hours);
- German Andreas Lorenz of the magazine Der Spiegel (July 2000, Jolo, for 25 days; he was also kidnapped in May);
- French television reporter Maryse Burgot and cameraman Jean-Jacques Le Garrec and sound technician Roland Madura (July 2000, Jolo, for 2 months);
- ABS-CBN television reporter Maan Macapagal and cameraman Val Cuenca (July 2000, Jolo, for 4 days);
- Philippine Daily Inquirer contributor and Net 25 television reporter Arlyn de la Cruz (January 2002, Zamboanga, for 3 months)
- GMA-7 television reporter Carlo Lorenzo and cameraman Gilbert Ordiales (September 2002, Jolo, for 6 days).
- Filipino Ces Drilon and news cameramen Jimmy Encarnacion and Angelo Valderrama released unharmed after ransom paid (June 2008 Maimbung, Sulu for 9 days; See 2008 Maimbung kidnappings).
- Jordanian TV journalist Baker Atyani and his two Filipino crews were kidnapped in June 2012 by the Abu Sayyaf militants they had sought to interview in the jungles of Sulu province. The two crew were freed in February 2013. Al Arabiya News Channel stated that their correspondent, Atyani, was handed over to the local governor's office on December 4, 2013. However, police and military officials could not ascertain whether Atyani had escaped from his captors or was freed.

===== Charles Watson =====
On November 14, 1993, American Christian linguist Charles Watson was kidnapped by Abu Sayyaf. Charles Watson was assisting in translating the New Testament into the Samal language. Anne West of SIL Global, the organization for which Watson worked, stated that the "Bible is helpful in bringing literacy to the tribal groups" and was "the best motivator in getting cultural minorities to open themselves up to education" as "tribal minorities can associate their sense of morality with what is written in the Bible." Watson was released about one month later.

===== Jeffrey Schilling =====
On August 31, 2000, American citizen and Muslim convert Jeffrey Schilling from Oakland, California, was captured on Jolo while visiting a terrorist camp with his new wife, Ivy Osani (a cousin of Abu Sabaya, one of the rebel leaders), whom he had met online. ASG demanded a $10 million ransom. Rebels also sarcastically threatened to behead him in 2001 as a "birthday present" to then Philippine President Gloria Macapagal Arroyo, who responded by declaring "all-out war" on them. The beheading threat was withdrawn after Schilling's mother, Carol, flew to the Philippines and appealed for mercy on local radio. On April 12, 2001, Philippine soldiers raided a rebel camp and rescued the American. The United States praised the Philippine government for freeing Schilling.

Many commentators have been critical of Schilling, who claims to have walked willingly into the camp after he was invited by his wife's cousin, a member of Abu Sayyaf.

Schilling was one of more than 40 hostages taken by Abu Sayyaf in 2000, including 21 tourists and workers seized in a raid on Sipadan diving resort in neighboring Malaysia. Many of the hostages were released after Libya paid millions of dollars. A Libyan official stated that Schilling had visited the Jolo camp often before his capture. Philippine intelligence sources say he was interested in selling military equipment to the rebels, while the bandits accused him of being a CIA agent. Abu Sayyaf threatened several times to kill Schilling. At one stage, Schilling reportedly went on a hunger strike to win his freedom.

===== Martin and Gracia Burnham =====
On May 27, 2001, an Abu Sayyaf raid kidnapped about 20 people from Dos Palmas, an expensive resort in Honda Bay, taking them to the north of Puerto Princesa City on the island of Palawan, which had been "considered completely safe". The most "valuable" hostages were three North Americans, Martin and Gracia Burnham, a missionary couple, and Guillermo Sobero, a Peruvian-American tourist who was later beheaded, following a $1 million ransom demand. The hostages and hostage-takers then returned to Abu Sayyaf territories in Mindanao. According to Bowden, the leader of the raid was Abu Sabaya. According to Gracia Burnham, she told her husband "to identify his kidnappers" to authorities "as 'the Osama bin Laden Group,' but Burnham was unfamiliar with that name and stuck with" Abu Sayyaf. After returning to Mindanao, Abu Sayyaf conducted numerous raids, including one that culminated in the Siege of Lamitan and "one at a coconut plantation called Golden Harvest; they took about 15 people captive there and later used bolo knives to hack the heads off two men. The number of hostages waxed and waned as some were ransomed and released, new ones were taken and others were killed."

On June 7, 2002, about a year after the raid, Philippine army troops conducted a rescue operation in which Martin Burnham and Filipino nurse Ediborah Yap were killed. The remaining hostage was wounded and the hostage takers escaped. In July 2004, Gracia Burnham testified at a trial of eight Abu Sayyaf members and identified six of the suspects as her captors, including Alhamzer Limbong, Abdul Azan Diamla, Abu Khari Moctar, Bas Ishmael, Alzen Jandul, and Dazid Baize. "The eight suspects sat silently during her three-hour testimony, separated from her by a wooden grill. They face the death sentence if found guilty of kidnapping for ransom. The trial began this year and is not expected to end for several months." Alhamzer Limbong was later killed in a prison uprising. Burnham claimed that Philippine military officials were colluding with her captors, saying that the Armed Forces of the Philippines "didn't pursue us ... As time went on, we noticed that they never pursued us".

===== 2007 Father Bossi kidnapping =====
On June 10, 2007, Italian priest Reverend Giancarlo Bossi was kidnapped near Pagadian, capital of Zamboanga del Sur Province in the southern Philippines. Pope Benedict XVI made an appeal to free him. Bossi was released on July 19, 2007, at Karumatan, a Muslim town in Lanao del Norte Province, allegedly after the payment of ransom. Father Bossi died in Italy on September 23, 2012.

In December 2020, Samad Awang, alias Ahmad Jamal, of the Abdussalam kidnap-for-ransom group was killed in a firefight with government troops in Zamboanga City. Awang was reportedly involved in the kidnapping of Italian missionary Fr. Giancarlo Bossi in 2007, businessman Joel Endino in 2011, and teacher Kathy Kasipong in 2013.

===== 2009 Red Cross kidnapping =====
On January 15, 2009, Abu Sayyaf kidnapped International Committee of the Red Cross (ICRC) delegates in Patikul, Sulu Province, Philippines. Three ICRC workers had finished conducting fieldwork in Sulu province, located in the southwest of the country when they were abducted by an unknown group, later confirmed as Albader Parad's group. All three were eventually released. According to a CNN story, Parad was reportedly killed, along with five other militants, in an assault by Philippine marines in Sulu province on Sunday, February 21, 2010.

===== 2009 Irish priest kidnapping =====
On October 11, 2009, Irish Catholic missionary Michael Sinnott, aged 79, from Barntown County Wexford was kidnapped from a gated compound in Pagadian, the capital of Zamboanga del Sur province, suspected to be part of ASG and some renegade members of MILF. Six kidnappers forced the priest into a mini-van and drove towards Sta. Lucia (district), where they transferred to a boat. Sinnott had a heart condition and was without medication when abducted. In early November, a demand for $US2 million ransom was made. On November 11, 2009, Father Sinnott was released in Zamboanga City. The Department of Foreign Affairs (Ireland) claimed that no ransom was paid by the Irish Government.

===== 2010 Japanese treasure hunter =====
On July 16, 2010, Japanese national Toshio Ito was kidnapped from Pangutaran, Sulu. At one point, the Philippine police believed the "treasure hunter", a Muslim convert also known by his Muslim name Mamaito Katayama, was acting as a cook for Abu Sayyaf; however, this was disputed by other nations, including the United States, which included him on its list of kidnap victims. A classified document obtained by Rappler lists Ito first, saying he was held captive by Abu Sayyaf's most senior leader, Radullan Sahiron, in Langpas, Indanan, Sulu early in 2013.

===== 2011 Malaysian gecko trader =====
On May 8, 2011, Malaysian gecko trader Mohammad Nasauddin Bin Saidin was kidnapped while hunting for gecko (tuko) in Indanan, Sulu. Saidin was freed on May 12, 2012.

===== 2011 Indian national kidnapping =====
On June 22, 2011, Indian national Biju Kolara Veetil was captured by four armed men while visiting his wife's relatives on the island of Jolo. A$10 million ransom was demanded. Veetil later denied that he was released in August 2012 because he had converted to Islam during captivity.

===== Warren Rodwell =====
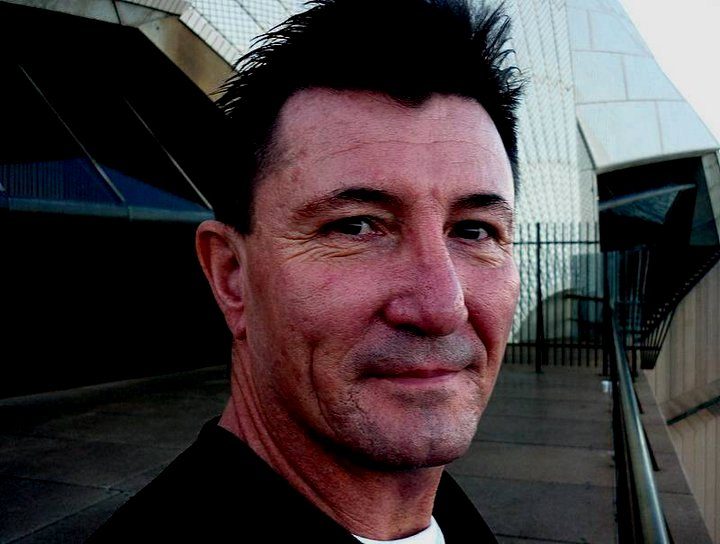
Survivor Warren Rodwell (2010) prior to abduction by Abu Sayyaf

Warren Richard Rodwell, a former Australian Army soldier and university English teacher, was shot through the right hand when seized from his home at Ipil, Zamboanga Sibugay on the island of Mindanao in the southern Philippines on December 5, 2011 by ASG militants. Rodwell later had to have a finger amputated. ASG threatened to behead Rodwell if their $US2 million ransom demand was not met. Both the Australian and Philippine governments had strict policies against paying ransoms. Australia formed a multi-agency task force to liaise with Rodwell's family and assist Philippine authorities. A news blackout was imposed. Filipino politicians helped negotiate the release. After the payment of $AUD94,000 for "board and lodging" expenses by his siblings, Rodwell was released on March 23, 2013.

====== Arrests and killings ======
On June 16, 2014, suspects Jimmy Nurilla (alias Doc) and Bakrin Haris were arrested. Both reportedly worked under Basilan-based Abu Sayyaf leader Khair Mundos and Furuji Indama. Authorities believed Nurilla and Haris took part in the Rodwell kidnapping, as well as the separate abduction of US citizen Gerfa Yeatts Lunsman and her son Kevin in 2012. In January 2015, Mindanao Examiner newspaper reported the arrest of Barahama Ali kidnap gang sub-leaders linked to the kidnapping of Rodwell, who was seized by at least 5 gunmen (disguised as policemen), and eventually handed over or sold by the kidnappers to the Abu Sayyaf in Basilan province.

In May 2015, ex-Philippine National Police (PNP) officer Jun A. Malban, alias Michael Zoo, was arrested in Kota Kinabalu, Malaysia, for the crime of "Kidnapping for Ransom" after Rodwell identified him as the negotiator/spokesperson. Further PNP investigation revealed that Malban is the cousin of Abu Sayyaf leaders Khair and Borhan Mundos (both of whom were arrested in 2014). The director of the Anti-Kidnapping Group (AKG) stated that Malban's arrest resulted from close co-ordination by the PNP, National Bureau of Investigation (Philippines) and Presidential Anti-Organized Crime Commission with the Malaysian counterparts and through Interpol. In January 2018, Rodwell attended a court hearing for Malban and others in Ipil, Zamboanga Sibugay, pursuant to a Supreme Court petition to transfer his case for security reasons to a court in either Manila or Zamboanga City.

In August 2015, Edeliza Sumbahon Ulep, alias Gina Perez, was arrested at Trento, Agusan del Sur during a joint manhunt operation by police and military units. Ulep was tagged as the ransom courier in the kidnapping. In August 2016, The Manila Times reported the arrest of the kidnap-for-ransom group of Barahama Alih sub-leader, Hasim Calon alias Husien (also a notorious drug dealer), in his hideout in Tenan village in Ipil town. Hasim Calon was involved in Rodwell's abduction. Earlier in 2016, police forces killed Waning Abdulsalam, a former MILF leader, in the village of Singkilon. Abdulsalam was one of the most wanted criminals in the southern Philippines and connected to ASG. He was linked to the kidnappings of Rodwell in 2011, Irish missionary Michael Sinnott in 2009 in Pagadian City, and Italian Catholic priest Giancarlo Bossi in Zamboanga del Sur's Payao town in 2007. In March 2019, combined security forces of the 44th Infantry Battalion, Philippine National Police, Philippine Drugs Enforcement Agency, National Bureau of Investigation and Philippine Coast Guard arrested five members (Benhazer Anduhol, Solaiman Calonof, Nicanel Maningo, Jay-ar Abba Quartocruz and Hashim Lucas Samdani) of Barahama Alih criminal gang during drug operations with warrants in Barangay Tenan of Ipil town, Zamboanga Sibugay. Military sources allege Barahama Alih Group was responsible for a number of kidnapping incidents in previous years including the abduction of Australian national Warren Rodwell, Italian priest Giancarlo Bossi, and some local Filipinos.

In February 2018, Abu Sayyaf sub-commander Nurhassan Jamiri was reported by Malaysia regional intelligence sources as one of three gunmen killed in a gunfight with police in Sabah. Jamiri was atop the Philippines' most wanted list and implicated in dozens of ransom kidnappings including Rodwell. In March 2018, Jamiri turned up alive when he and thirteen followers surrendered to authorities in Basilan. Over the preceding two years, many Abu Sayyaf bandits had surrendered to authorities in Basilan, Sulu, and Tawi-Tawi. More were expected to yield because of the regional government's Program Against Violence and Extremism (PAVE), designed to provide opportunities and interventions, including psychosocial sessions, medical check-ups, introduction to farming systems, and expository tours outside the island provinces to facilitate the reintegration of former combatants into society. In April 2018, Rodwell lauded the surrenders and reintegration program, but said he would not interfere with the legal processing of any charges already filed against anyone involved with his own kidnapping.

In June 2020, Inquirer newspaper reported the killing of Mamay Aburi by government troops in Titay, Zamboanga Sibugay after authorities attended to serve a warrant of arrest. Aburi was allegedly a subleader of a kidnap-for-ransom group and had been linked with the Abu Sayyaf Group based in Sulu. The provincial director of the Criminal Investigation and Detection Group (CIDG) said Aburi was involved in the 2011 kidnapping of Australian national Warren Rodwell and the 2019 abduction of the Hyrons couple in Tukuran, Zamboanga del Sur. In February 2021, The Manila Times reported that Abu Sayyaf subleader Arrasid Halissam was shot dead when he opened fire on police serving a warrant on him in the village of Santa Maria, Zamboanga City. Halissam was linked to numerous kidnappings such as Australian adventurer Warren Rodwell, Americans Gerfa Lunsmann and son Kevin, Chinese Yuan Lin Kai and Jian Luo, South Korean Nwi Seong Hong, and almost a dozen Filipinos. Halissam was also allegedly involved in the 2015 bombing in Zamboanga that killed two people and injured over fifty others.

===== 2012 European bird watchers =====
On February 1, 2012, two European bird watchers were seized on Tawi Tawi island. Swiss Lorenzo Vinciguerra escaped in December 2014 as government troops attacked the jungle camp where he was captive on the island of Jolo. Vinciguerra was shot by rebels as he escaped; however, his injuries were non-life-threatening. Dutch captive Ewold Horn was reportedly unable to escape. The whereabouts of Horn remained unknown. On May 31, 2019, Western Mindanao Command confirmed that Horn was shot dead during a clash with military in Patikul, Sulu. Additionally, the military advised that the wife of ASG leader Radulan Sahiron and five other ASG members were also killed.

===== 2012 Mayor Jeffrey Lim Kidnapping =====
On April 2, 2012, Mayor Jeffrey Lim of Salug, Zamboanga del Norte was kidnapped by ten armed men disguised as policemen. Lim was reportedly handed over to Abu Sayyaf. On November 6, he was freed near Zamboanga City after payment of P1.3M ($US25,000) ransom. On August 9, 2013, a Mindanao Pagadian Frontline report named a "Sehar Muloc" aka "Red Eye" as a suspect in the 2012 kidnapping of Mayor Jeffrey Lim. Abner Gumandol, alias Sehar Muloc and Red Eye, was said to be the leader of a criminal syndicate called the Muloc Group. Gumandol was arrested on June 12, 2016.

===== 2014 Kabasalan ZSP kidnapping =====
On September 11, 2014, Chinese national Li Pei Zhei was abducted by four gunmen in Kabasalan, Zamboanga Sibugay and taken to Basilan. He was released in Sitio Lugay-Lugay, Barangay Naga-Naga, Alicia, Zamboanga Sibugay on November 5, 2014. Police subsequently charged Ibni Basaludin, Yug Enriquez, Brahama Ali, and Ging-Ging Calon, all residents of Barangay Tenan, Ipil, Zamboanga Sibugay with kidnapping with serious illegal detention.

===== 2015 Roseller Lim ZSP kidnapping =====
On January 24, 2015, Korean national Nwi Seong Hong was abducted by armed men in Roseller Lim, Zamboanga Sibugay Province. The victim's son, Abby, escaped after he fought off the kidnappers. According to intelligence information from the JTG-SULU, the captors of were Algabsy Misaya, Idang Susukan, Alden Bagade and Mohammad Salud alias Ama Maas, Indanan-based members led by sub-leaders Isang Susukan and Anga Adji. On October 31, 2015, the body of 74-year-old Nwi Seong Hong was found in Barangay Bangkal, Patikul, Sulu. Investigators said the victim died due to severe illness.

===== 2015 Samal Island kidnappings =====
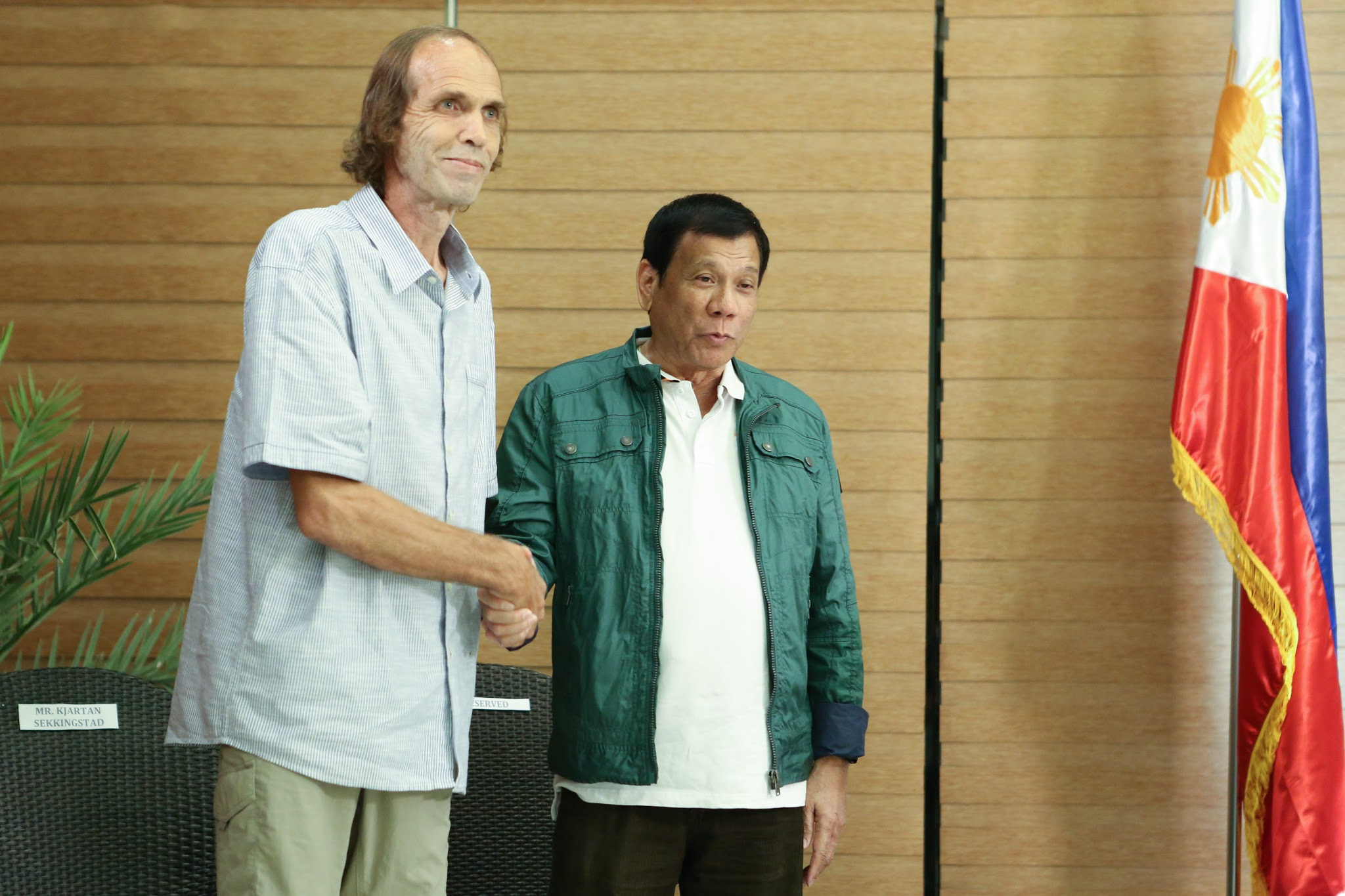
Kjartan Sekkingstad (left), one of the people kidnapped by the ASG in Samal Island in 2015, meets with President Rodrigo Duterte (right) after his release from ASG captivity.

On September 21, 2015, Canadians Robert Hall and John Ridsdel, as well as Norwegian Kjartan Sekkingstad, and (Hall's girlfriend) Marites Flor; a Filipino woman, were abducted on Samal Island near Davao. Ridsdel was beheaded by Abu Sayyaf on April 25, 2016, following a ransom deadline. ASG reportedly demanded more than $8.1 million for Ridsdel and the others.

On May 3, 2016, a video of the Ridsdel execution was released, along with new demands for the remaining hostages. A masked captor said, "Note to the Philippine government and to the Canadian government: The lesson is clear. John Ridsdel has been beheaded. Now there are three remaining captives here. If you procrastinate once again the negotiations, we will behead this all anytime".

On May 15, Hall appeared in a new video, announcing that he and Norwegian Kjartan Sekkingstad would be decapitated at 3 pm on Monday June 13 absent a ransom of $16 million. Both hostages wore orange coveralls, similar to hostages in videos produced by IS, to which Abu Sayyaf had previously pledged allegiance. The deadline passed. Hall was beheaded.

On June 24, Abu Sayyaf released Filipina Marites Flor. She was subsequently flown to Davao to meet President-elect Rodrigo Duterte. Duterte said he directed negotiations with the Abu Sayyaf. He did not elaborate.

On September 17, 2016, remaining hostage Norwegian Kjartan Sekkingstad was released on Jolo island. Abu Rami, an ASG spokesman, claimed $638,000 was paid as ransom.

===== 2015 Dipolog kidnapping =====
On October 7, 2015, Italian national and pizza restaurant owner Rolando del Torchio was kidnapped in Dipolog, the capital of Zamboanga del Norte. On April 8, 2016, Del Torchio was released and found at Jolo port aboard MV KC Beatrice bound for Zamboanga City after his family paid P29 million ($US650,000) in ransom.

==== 2019 Tukuran kidnapping ====
On October 4, 2019, armed men abducted British national Allan Hyrons and his Filipina wife Wilma from their beach resort in Tukuran town, Zamboanga del Sur province on the southern island of Mindanao. After a brief exchange of gunfire in November between Abu Sayyaf and Philippine troops on the island of Jolo, the couple was abandoned and rescued. No ransom was reportedly paid.

==== In Malaysia ====
===== 2000 Sipadan kidnappings =====
On May 3, 2000, Abu Sayyaf guerrillas occupied the Malaysian dive resort island Sipadan and took 21 hostages, including 10 tourists and 11 resort workers – 19 foreign nationals in total. The hostages were taken to an Abu Sayyaf base in Jolo. Two Muslim Malaysians were released soon after. Abu Sayyaf made various demands for the release of several prisoners, including 1993 World Trade Center bomber Ramzi Yousef and $2.4 million. In July, a Filipino television evangelist and 12 of members of the Jesus Miracle Crusade Church offered their help and went as mediators for the relief of other hostages. They, three French television crew members and a German journalist, all visiting Abu Sayyaf on Jolo, were also taken hostage. Most hostages were released in August and September 2000, partly due to mediation by Libyan leader Muammar Gaddafi and an offer of $25 million in "development aid".

Abu Sayyaf conducted a second raid on the island of Pandanan near Sipadan on September 10 and seized three more Malaysians. The Philippine army launched a major offensive on September 16, 2000, rescuing all remaining hostages, except Filipino dive instructor Roland Ullah. He was freed in 2003. Abu Sayyaf coordinated with the Chinese 14K Triad gang in carrying out the kidnappings. The 14K Triad has militarily supported Abu Sayyaf.

===== 2013 Pom Pom kidnappings =====
On November 15, 2013, Abu Sayyaf militants raided a resort on the Malaysian island of Pom Pom. During the ambush, Taiwanese citizen Chang An-wei was kidnapped and her husband, Hsu Li-min, was killed. Chang was taken to the Sulu Archipelago. Chang was freed in Sulu Province and returned to Taiwan on December 21.

===== 2014 Singamata, Baik Island and Kampung Air Sapang kidnappings =====
On April 2, 2014, a kidnap gang believed to originate from Abu Sayyaf militants raided Singamata Reef Resort off Semporna. Chinese tourist Gao Huayun from Shanghai and Filipino resort worker Marcy Dayawan were abducted and taken to the Sulu Archipelago. The two hostages were later rescued after a collaboration between Malaysian and Philippines security forces.

On May 6, five Abu Sayyaf gunmen raided a Malaysian fish farm on Baik Island Sabah, kidnapped the fish farm manager and took him to Jolo island. He was freed in July with the help of Malaysian negotiators.

On June 16, two gunmen believed to be from Abu Sayyaf kidnapped a Chinese fish farm manager and one Filipino worker in Kampung Air Sapang. The worker managed to escape and disappeared. Meanwhile, the fish farm manager was taken to Jolo. He was released on December 10.

Malaysian authorities identified five Filipinos, the "Muktadil brothers", as responsible for these cases. They sold their hostages to the Abu Sayyaf group. Of the five Muktadil brothers: Mindas Muktadil was killed by Philippine police in May 2015, Kadafi Muktadil was arrested in late 2015, Nixon Muktadil and Brown Muktadil were killed by the Philippine military on September 27, 2016, after they resisted arrest, while Badong Muktadil succumbed to his injuries while fleeing after he was shot when his brothers was killed. His body was discovered in a pump boat in Mususiasi.

===== 2015 Ocean King Restaurant kidnappings =====
On May 15, 2015, four armed Abu Sayyaf members kidnapped two Malaysian nationals from Ocean King Restaurant in an upscale resort in Sandakan, Sabah and took them to Parang, Sulu. Police identified the leaders of the group behind the abduction as Alhabsy Misaya, Alden Bagade and Angah Adji. On November 8, Thien Nyuk Fun, the seafood restaurant owner, was released after payment of 30 million pesos ($US675,000) ransom. The initial agreement of 30 million pesos was reportedly for both hostages; however, a faction within the Abu Sayyaf Group demanded more after Thien Nyuk Fun was released. Further negotiations broke down and the other hostage, electrical engineer Bernard Then, was beheaded on Jolo Island on November 17.

==== Philippines and Malaysia waters ====
===== 2014 German sailors kidnapping =====
In April 2014, Germans Dr. Stefan Viktor Okonek and Henrike Dielen were captured on their yacht on the high seas near Borneo. Abu Sayyaf threatened to behead one of them. After payment of $US5.6 million in October 2014, the pair were released in Patikul, Sulu.

===== 2016 Local and foreign sailors kidnappings =====
On March 26, 2016, ten Indonesian seafarers were held hostage by ASG operating in Sulu Archipelago. They were abducted from the Brahma 12 tugboat and the Anand 12 barge near Tawi-Tawi province. The Indonesian vessels were freighting coal from South Borneo heading for Batangas port when hijacked. In April, the Indonesian government announced that the company that owned tugboat Brahma 12 had agreed to pay the 50-million-peso ($1 million) ransom. On May 2, they were released.

On April 1, four Malaysian sailors aboard a tugboat from Manila were kidnapped when they arrived near the shore of Ligitan Island. Their companions, three Myanmar nationals and two Indonesians, were unharmed. On June 8, they were released.

On April 15, four Indonesian sailors were kidnapped when two Indonesian tugboats from Cebu, Henry and Cristi, were attacked by Abu Sayyaf militants. While five of the passengers were safe, one was shot before he was rescued. They were released on May 11. A group of concerned Filipinos in Sabah urged Philippine president-elect Rodrigo Duterte to intervene for the release of four Malaysians held hostage by Abu Sayyaf. The issue strained the relationship between the Philippines and Malaysia.

On June 21, seven Indonesian sailors were kidnapped while aboard a tugboat passing through the Sulu Archipelago.

On July 9, three Indonesian fishermen were kidnapped near the coast of Lahad Datu, Sabah, Malaysia and released on September 17.

On July 18, five Malaysian sailors were abducted near the coast of Lahad Datu.

On August 3, an Indonesian sailor was kidnapped in the waters of Malaysia leaving two other crew members unharmed. This incident was reported by victims on August 5. Two of the hostages managed to escape after receiving persistent threats of beheading.

On September 10, three Filipino fishermen were kidnapped on the shores of Pom Pom Island.

On September 22, another Indonesian hostage was released.

On September 27, one Malaysian boat-skipper was kidnapped from his trawler by seven armed militants before the group attacked another Indonesian trawler; however, no kidnappings were committed in the second incident. The hostage was released on October 1, with no ransom demand, along with three Indonesians hostages who were released the same day.

On October 21, approximately ten Abu Sayyaf militants attacked a South Korean-bound vessel named MV Dongbang Gian and abducted a South Korean skipper and a Filipino crewman off Bongao, Tawi-Tawi.

On November 5, German sailor Sabine Merz was shot dead while her husband Jürgen Kantner was abducted from their yacht off Tanjong Luuk Pisuk in Sabah. On or before February 27, 2017, Kantner was beheaded after a ransom of 30 million pesos ($US600,000) was not paid.

On November 11, Vietnamese vessel MV Royale 16 with nineteen sailors on board was attacked by Abu Sayyaf near Basilan, abducting six sailors and injuring one. The remaining thirteen sailors were released.

On November 20, two Indonesian fishermen were kidnapped by five gunmen off Lahad Datu.

Due to the increase of attacks against foreign vessels by Abu Sayyaf, the governments of Indonesia, Malaysia, and the Philippines agreed to jointly patrol their waters on May 5, 2016. The three countries formed another agreement on joint air patrols.

During the first six months of 2016, Abu Sayyaf made $7.3 million, equivalent to Php 353 million, from ransom payoffs.

=== Beheadings ===
As part of its kidnap-for-ransom operations, the Abu Sayyaf has executed some of their male hostages if ransom demands were not met. The group had previously beheaded Christian civilians and others they consider kafir without demanding ransoms for their release, due to their religious affiliation.

=== Bombings ===
==== 2004 Superferry 14 Bombing ====
Superferry 14 was a large ferry destroyed by a bomb on February 27, 2004, killing 116 people in the Philippines' worst terrorist attack and the world's deadliest terrorist attack at sea. On that day, the 10,192 ton ferry sailed out of Manila with about 900 passengers and crew on board. A television set filled with 8 lb. (4 kilograms) of TNT had been placed on board. 90 minutes out of port, the bomb exploded. 63 people were killed instantly and 53 were missing and presumed dead. Despite claims from terrorist groups, the blast was initially thought to have been an accident caused by a gas explosion. However, after divers righted the ferry five months after it had sunk, they found evidence of a bomb blast. A man called Redendo Cain Dellosa admitted to planting the bomb for Abu Sayyaf. Six suspects were arrested in connection with the bombing while the masterminds, Khadaffy Janjalani and Abu Sulaiman, were killed.

==== 2016 Davao City bombing ====
On September 2, 2016, an explosion occurred at a night market in Davao City, Philippines killing at least 15 and injuring 70. Shortly before the bombing, Abu Sayyaf made a threat following the intensified military operation against them. Abu Sayyaf spokesperson Abu Rami was reported to claim responsibility. He later denied the report and any involvement, saying a group allied to them; the Daulat Ul-Islamiya were responsible. Although the Abu Sayyaf spokesman denied involvement, the Philippine government blame the group.

This is not the first time that Davao has been sacrificed to the altar of violence. It's always connected with Abu Sayyaf before. They gave a warning. We know that.

— Rodrigo Duterte, President of the Philippines

==== 2019 Jolo Cathedral bombings ====
On January 27, 2019, two bombs detonated at the Roman Catholic Cathedral of Our Lady of Mount Carmel in Jolo town which is the center of Abu Sayyaf stronghold. The bombings resulting to eighteen people were killed while 82 others were injured, mostly from Philippine Army's 35th Battalion and civilians inside the church. The Philippine military said the Abu Sayyaf under the faction of Ajang-Ajang are responsible which is also echoed by peace advocate with evidence from military intelligence operatives that they have intercepted plans of the latter to bomb the other parts of downtown Jolo months before. The bombings took place a week after a referendum for the creation of Bangsamoro Autonomous Region with the attacks is described as the opposition by the Abu Sayyaf group for their areas inclusion under the Bangsamoro authorities since the whole Sulu province itself is already known to be against the referendum with 163,526 oppose votes (54.3%).

== Criticism of attacks against civilians ==
Sheikh Yusuf al-Qaradawi in Qatar denounced the kidnappings and killings committed by Abu Sayyaf, asserting that they are not part of the dispute between the Abu Sayyaf and the Philippine government. He stated that it is shameful to commit such acts in the name of the Islamic faith, saying that such acts produce backlash against Islam and Muslims. During the 2000 Sipadan kidnappings, the Organization of the Islamic Conference (OIC) condemned the kidnapping and offered to help secure their release. OIC Secretary General Azeddine Laraki told the Philippine government he was prepared to send an envoy to help save the hostages and issued a statement condemning the rebels. "The Secretary General has pointed out that this operation and the like are rejected by divine laws and that they are neither the appropriate nor correct means to resolve conflicts", the statement said.

The terrorism against civilians committed were condemned by MNLF and MILF, who said that Abu Sayyaf strayed from their real paths of struggle, with MILF labeling Abu Sayyaf as "anti-Islam" soon after Ridsdel's beheading in 2016. MNLF described the group as "causing chaos to their community". Both Christian and Muslim groups in the Philippines condemned Abu Sayyaf beheadings.

The kidnappings were criticized by Indonesia. On July 14, 2016, a group of Indonesian protesters gathered in front of the Philippine Embassy in Jakarta, holding banners that read "Go to hell Philippines and Abu Sayyaf" and "Destroy the Philippines and Abu Sayyaf" due to what was seen as the lack of action from the Philippine government. The group demanded a large scale military operation to destroy the Abu Sayyaf, with the Indonesian military proposing to send its forces to the Philippines prior to the protest, only to be rejected by the Philippine government on constitutional grounds.

== Military operations ==
The Philippine military has engaged Abu Sayyaf since the 1990s. Under President Duterte, the Philippine government sought a peace agreement with the MNLF and MILF, but not the "bunch of criminals" in Abu Sayyaf. The Philippine military intensified operations in 2003, following the arrest of a Filipino-American who was alleged to have sold illegal weapons to the group. The suspect was tagged by US authorities as "one of the United States' most wanted fugitives". He was then deported by the Philippine government to face legal action in the United States.

On July 29, 2016, the military gained control of an Abu Sayyaf stronghold in Tipo-Tipo. The Philippine military pledged to eliminate Abu Sayyaf. On August 25, President Duterte ordered the group to be "destroyed" after it beheaded a teenager. Following the incident, the Philippine military sent thousands of troops to fight and destroy Abu Sayyaf. Filipino Army Major Filemon Tan said, "The order of the president is to search and destroy the Abu Sayyaf so that's what we are doing". Both MNLF and MILF began helping to suppress extremism in Mindanao, which helps the peace process for both groups.

Philippine security forces collaborated with Malaysia and Indonesia to maintain security in the Sulu Sea. The Indonesian government proposed to station army units in Mindanao to launch a major offensive against Abu Sayyaf. The Indonesian government called on the Malaysian and Philippine armies to launch combined land attacks together on Mindanao, while at the same time urging the Philippine government to allow Indonesia and Malaysia military forces to enter Philippine territory. The Vietnamese military started to hold military exercises against Abu Sayyaf (known locally as "pirates" by the Vietnamese) following the repeat kidnappings of Malaysian and Indonesian sailors. The Philippine military provided one battalion to go against each subgroup. On September 9, following the meeting between President Duterte and Indonesian President Joko Widodo, an agreement was reached to pursue the Abu Sayyaf. The Philippine President said:

We agreed to encourage the earliest and effective implementation of cooperative frameworks to address security issues in maritime areas of common concern. We expressed commitment to take all necessary measures to ensure security in the Sulu Sea and maritime areas of common concern. There will be some interdiction by their armed forces and our armed forces and that is not really a warning but just a statement that we have decided to end this problem once and for all. Unlike the previous agreement with our neighbours, this time we will allow our neighbours to chase ships and pursue them even when they are in Philippine waters – "until such time that there is a competent Philippine authority who will take over in the chase. Maybe what's in my mind really is the hot pursuit and if the hot pursuit is done in the high seas, in the international waters, they can and they can even arrest or destroy them if they present a violent resistance". Malaysia will also be involved in this co-operation.

— Rodrigo Duterte, President of the Philippines

However, the government of Indonesia decided to not launch a military operation in the southern Philippines, stating that there is enough Philippine military personnel had been deployed. Indonesia's view was seconded by Malaysia. Philippine military chief Ricardo Visaya warned the Abu Sayyaf that they would continue with further major military operations. The military chief gave notice to Abu Sayyaf members to surrender or be "neutralised", (killed or apprehended).

Some 20 Abu Sayyaf surrendered in Sumisip on September 22. The day before, Philippine armed forces confiscated 200 speedboats used by the Abu Sayyaf in Basilan, Sulu, Tawi-Tawi and Zamboanga. President Duterte rejected a proposal by Nur Misuari, the leader of MNLF to include Abu Sayyaf in peace talks. On September 27, another attempt to smuggle weapons to Abu Sayyaf was prevented by the Philippine National Police in San Juan City. Four people were arrested. By October 14, the Philippine military had launched 579 military operations, 426 of which were focused to "neutralise" group members. 54 engagements resulted in 56 Abu Sayyaf members killed, 21 surrendered and 17 arrested.

Abu Sayyaf fatalities then increased to 102, with seven more apprehended. Notable Abu Sayyaf leaders were killed, including Nelson Muktadil, Braun Muktadil, their sub-leader Mohammad Said, Jamiri Jawhari, Musanna Jamiri, the group spokesman Abu Rami and Alhabsy Misaya. In addition, another 165 fast boats used for transport and kidnapping activities were confiscated. By April 13, 2017, 50 more ASG members had surrendered. In the same month, Philippine authorities discovered the presence of militants from Indonesia and Malaysia killed during the ongoing operations (notable foreigners such as Sanusi, Zulkifli Abdhir, Ibrahim Ali, Mohd Najib Husen and Mohisen were among the dead) as well as the presence of a "traitor" among their security members when a top policewoman was caught for her ties with the group. Indonesia admitted the presence of its citizens who came from North Sulawesi and said they could not prevent them from joining, given the lack of security on their borders. Malaysia discovered that militants were using Sabah as a transit point. The two pledged to prevent cross-border terrorism and curb the activities of militants.

Early on November 26, 2016, Duterte stated that he would open peace talks with Abu Sayyaf group (as he did with the MNLF and MILF by offering federalism as a possible solution) while continuing to fight against the Maute group, a move criticized by Philippine analysts as it would be used by extreme rebels to claim for legitimacy as a group. In a statement, the President said:

I can bomb more if I want to. At the end of the day, what can I say to the Filipino? That we have wiped out almost all of our Yakan, Sama, Tausūg brothers? Even those not connected with the violence now? Either we talk, if you want autonomy or if you want something else, federalism, I am ready. I am committed to (a) federalism set-up to appease the Moro.

His statements were criticized by national media as leading to confusion about whether he wanted peace talks. Another IS-linked group, the Maute emerged in 2016. On December 7, Duterte told the Indonesian and Malaysian leaders that "they can bomb the Abu Sayyaf along with the hostages if the Abu Sayyaf continue to present persistent threats and the hostages should already know that there is repeated warnings to not go there". In early 2019, Duterte emphatically stated that he would never initiate or agree to any peace talks with Abu Sayyaf due to his detestation for the group's record of atrocities and its treatment of innocent people as young as 8 years old.

In the aftermath of the 2019 Jolo Cathedral bombings, President Duterte ordered an "All-Out-War" directive against the Abu Sayyaf Group, which led to heavy ground operations, massive airstrikes, artillery bombardment in surrounding areas, the evacuation of civilian in other areas, and the creation of the 11th Infantry Division of the Philippine Army.

== See also ==
- Bangsamoro Islamic Freedom Fighters
- Siege of Marawi
