= Jainal Antel Sali Jr. =

Abu Sayyaf leader (1964-2007)

- جَئِنَلْ اَنْتِلْ سَلِ جُپُرْ
- Born: June 1, 1964; Zamboanga City, Philippines
- Died: January 16, 2007 (aged 42); Jolo, Sulu, Philippines
- Cause of death: Gunshot wound

Jainal Antel Sali Jr. (June 1, 1964 – January 16, 2007) was a Filipino militant who was a senior leader of Abu Sayyaf, an Islamist terrorist organization affiliated with Al Qaeda.

Born in Zamboanga City, Mindanao, in Philippines, Sali was also known as The Engineer, and by other aliases; "Abu Solaiman, Abu Solajman, Abu Sulaiman, Abu Sulayman, and Jainal Antal Sali Jr." He spoke Tausug, Tagalog, Arabic, and English.

Sali was indicted in the United States District Court for the District of Columbia, for his alleged involvement in terrorist acts, including hostage kidnapping and murder, against United States nationals and other foreign nationals in and around the Republic of the Philippines.

For that indictment, on February 24, 2006, Jainal Antel Sali Jr. was among six fugitives in the second and most recent group of indicted fugitives to be added to the FBI Most Wanted Terrorists list along with two fellow members of Abu Sayyaf.

The United States government Rewards For Justice Program, United States Department of State offered a 5 million United States dollar (250,000,000 Philippine pesos) reward for Sali's capture, prior to his death.

== Background on Zamboanga City birthplace ==
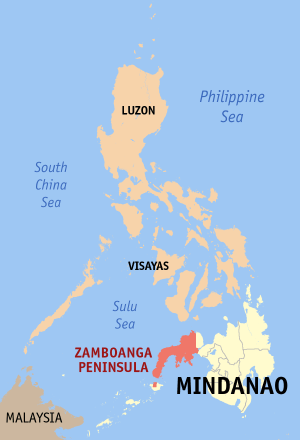
Philippines, with Zamboanga Peninsula in red, and Basilan island just below the southwestern tip

The peninsula is attached to the western edge of the large island of Mindanao, but it is governed separately from that Islamic territory, which is now (since 1996) governed as part of the Autonomous Region in Muslim Mindanao (ARMM).

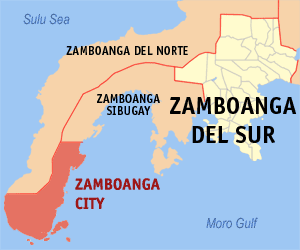
Zamboanga City in red

Being on the social or political division line, the neighboring Basilan island has seen some of the fiercest fighting between government troops and the Muslim separatist group Abu Sayyaf through the early 2000s.

When Sali was still a pre-teen, in the early 1970s, the Moro National Liberation Front (MNLF) was the main Muslim rebel group fighting in the Basilan region of the southern Philippines.

== Abu Sayyaf Group under Abdurajik Janjalani ==
After the late 1980s Abdurajik Abubakar Janjalani returned home to Basilan from the Soviet–Afghan War to establish his own offshoot group in the southern Philippines, out of members of the extant MNLF.

By then, as a political solution in the southern Philippines, ARMM had been created, in 1989, when Sali was 25 years old.

On Basilan, Abdurajik Janjalani gathered radical members of the old MNLF in 1990, to found the Abu Sayyaf Group. It was named after his own alias, which was Abu Sayyaf. MNLF had moderated into an established political party, which eventually became the ruling party of the ARMM, by its full institutionalization in 1996 on the southern Philippines island of Mindanao.

Meanwhile, Abu Sayyaf Group had started out on their own by 1991 under the leadership of the elder Janjalani brother, Abdurajik. By 1995 Abu Sayyaf had been active in large scale bombings and attacks in the Philippines, and also had become associated with Ramzi Yousef and also with Jemaah Islamiyah. On December 18, 1998, the founder Abdurajik Janjalani was killed in a firefight with the Philippine National Police on Basilan island.

== Abu Sayyaf Group under Khadaffy Janjalani ==
The younger Janjalani brother, 23-year-old Khadaffy Janjalani, then eventually took power and Abu Sayyaf began a new tactic, as they proceeded to take hostages.

The group's motive for kidnapping became more financial and less religious during the period of Khadaffy's leadership, according to locals in the areas associated with Abu Sayyaf. The hostage money is probably the method of financing of the group.

Jainal Antel Sali Jr., along with Khadaffy Janjalani, was indicted in the United States for his alleged involvement in terrorist acts, including hostage taking by Abu Sayyaf and murder, against United States nationals and other foreign nationals in and around the Republic of the Philippines.

Consequently, on February 24, 2006, Sali and Janjalani were among six fugitives in the second and most recent group of indicted fugitives to be added to the FBI Most Wanted Terrorists list along with a third fellow member of Abu Sayyaf, Isnilon Totoni Hapilon.

== Death ==
On January 16, 2007, Sali was killed during a gunfight with Special Forces soldiers in a village about 950 kilometers (590 miles) south of Manila. Local villagers and Sali's wife identified his body. DNA tests confirmed his death.
