= Radullan Sahiron =

Filipino Islamist militant

- رَادُوْلَنْ سَهِيْرَونْ
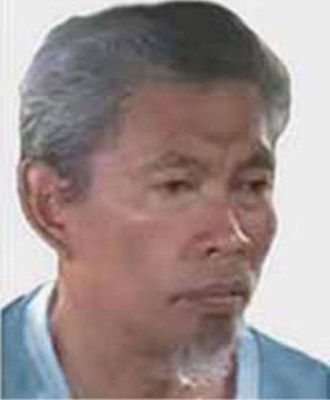
- Federal Bureau of Investigation photo of Radullan Sahiron
- Born: c. 1955 (age 70); Patikul, Philippines
- Other names: Radullon Sahiron; Commander Putol
- Known for: Leader of the militant group Abu Sayyaf
- Predecessor: Khadaffy Janjalani
- Children: Ismin Sahiron (killed August 2006)

Radullan Sahiron (born c. 1955) is a Filipino Islamic militant who was the leader of Abu Sayyaf. He is said to have taken command of the organization following the death of Khadaffy Janjalani in September 2006.

== History ==
Sahiron was born in Kabbon Takas, Patikul, Jolo island, Sulu, Philippines. According to the United States Federal Bureau of Investigation, he is 5'6" with a slight build and weighs 140 pounds. He speaks Tausug and Arabic. He lost his right arm, described as amputated above the elbow, fighting security forces in the 1970s, hence his nom de guerre, Commander Putol; putol is Filipino for "cut off".

== Militant activity ==
Sahiron is wanted by the United States government which has put a $1,000,000 bounty on his head through their Rewards for Justice Program. According to the Rewards for Justice Program and the Federal Bureau of Investigation, he is wanted for his alleged involvement in the kidnapping of a United States citizen on 14 November 1993. The victim was abducted from his residence at Simbahan, Pangutaran, Sulu by approximately 14 armed members of the terrorist organization Al Harakat al Islamiyyah, also known as the Abu Sayyaf Group. The victim was transported to the terrorists' jungle camp on the southern Philippine island of Jolo. He was held captive for 23 days until his release on 7 December 1993. Sahiron was indicted in the United States District Court, Washington, D.C., on 27 February 2007, and was charged with hostage taking, aiding and abetting and causing an act to be done. An arrest warrant was issued on the same date.

Sahiron allegedly played a role in the May 2001 Dos Palmas kidnappings of three U.S. citizens, including Martin and Gracia Burnham, and 17 Filipinos from a tourist resort in Palawan. Several of the hostages, including US citizen Guillermo Sobero, were murdered.

Sahiron is believed to have masterminded the 2008 kidnapping of Filipina broadcast journalist Ces Drilon.

In July 2016, 130 Sahiron-led Abu Sayyaf fighters battled against the Armed Forces of the Philippines in the jungles of Patikul town in Sulu province. One government soldier was killed and six wounded while the army claimed 9 militants were killed and 13 injured.

Sahiron reportedly sent surrender feelers to the AFP's Western Mindanao Command in April 2017, with the condition that he would remain in the custody of Philippine authorities and not be extradited to the United States.

== Reports of death ==
Sahiron, who was rumored to be in poor health, reportedly died in Sulu in 2023 though the AFP acknowledged that they did not have concrete evidence of Sahiron's death.

== See also ==
- FBI Most Wanted Terrorists
