= Abu Sabaya =

Abu Sayyaf leader (1962–2002)

- اَبُ سَبَيَ
- Born: Aldam Tilao; July 18, 1962
- Died: June 21, 2002 (aged 39)
- Cause of death: Gunshot wound
- Known for: A senior leader of the Filipino militant group Abu Sayyaf
- Predecessor: Abdurajak Abubakar Janjalani

Abu Sabaya (/ˈɑːbuː səbəˈjɑː/ AH-boo sə-bə-YAH; July 18, 1962 – June 21, 2002), born Aldam Tilao, was one of the leaders of the Abu Sayyaf in the southern Philippines until he was shot down by soldiers of the Armed Forces of the Philippines in 2002.

== Life ==
Abu Sabaya was a former engineering student and police trainee in Zamboanga City. He had lived in Saudi Arabia for several years before returning to the Philippines in the late 1990s.

Prior to his death, the United States government had placed a US$5,000,000 reward on his arrest for the May 2001 Dos Palmas kidnappings of two American missionaries and another American who was beheaded. According to the Philippine Army documents, Sabaya had dropped out of a criminology course to join the Moro National Liberation Front (M.N.L.F.), an Islamic rebel group, who trained him in bomb-making and assassination. When the M.N.L.F. signed a peace treaty with the Philippine government in 1996, Sabaya joined Filipinos working in Saudi Arabia. Upon his return to the Philippines he came into contact with Abdurajak Abubakar Janjalani, one of the founders of the Abu Sayyaf. Sabaya was accused of several hostage kidnappings. In Basilan, he was accused of being involved in 13 kidnappings incidents, including that of a Roman Catholic priest, schoolchildren and teachers. In retaliation, the Philippine government offered a 5,000,000 peso reward for his capture.

On June 21, 2002, after being tracked by United States and Philippine forces, Sabaya was confronted by a Special Warfare Group team of the Philippine Navy. After attempting to evade capture, Sabaya was shot and shot down at sea. Four other members of the Abu Sayyaf survived and were arrested during the incident. According to Australian scholar Bob East, Sabaya's death has had a significant impact on the Abu Sayyaf, as the number of operatives working for the group sharply decreased from 1100 in 2001 to 450 in late 2002, and had since been stagnant for the next ten years.

== Sources ==
- Search for Abu Sayyaf leader's body CNN, June 22, 2002
- Philippines rebel leader 'shot' BBC, June 21, 2002
- "Abu Sabaya: Trainee policeman turned Public Enemy No. 1". Archived from the original on 27 May 2003.
- Harakah Daily: Top Abu Sayyaf leader slain in southern Philippines
