= Jesus Miracle Crusade =

Religious denomination in the Philippines

The Jesus Miracle Crusade International Ministry (JMCIM) is a Oneness Pentecostal denomination in the Philippines. The church is founded and headed by Pastor Evangelist Wilde Estrada Almeda and Assistant Pastor Lina Comon Almeda in 1975 at Manila, Philippines. They have churches in Canada, United States, Saudi Arabia, Japan, South Korea, Italy and Australia. With more than 3 million members worldwide, the Jesus Miracle Crusade International Ministry is one of the largest and most influential oneness pentecostal/apostolic churches in the Philippines

== History ==
The JMCIM was founded on February 14, 1975, as "The Jesus Church" by Evangelist-Pastor Wilde E. Almeda, together with his wife, Assistant Pastor Lina C. Almeda, in Urduja Village, Novaliches, Quezon City.

In December 2000, 12 evangelists from the church were held hostage by Abu Sayyaf, a Jihadist militant and pirate group. It celebrated its 50th anniversary in 2025, with fireworks also seen at the end to commemorate the anniversary. All the people were all invited to celebrate.

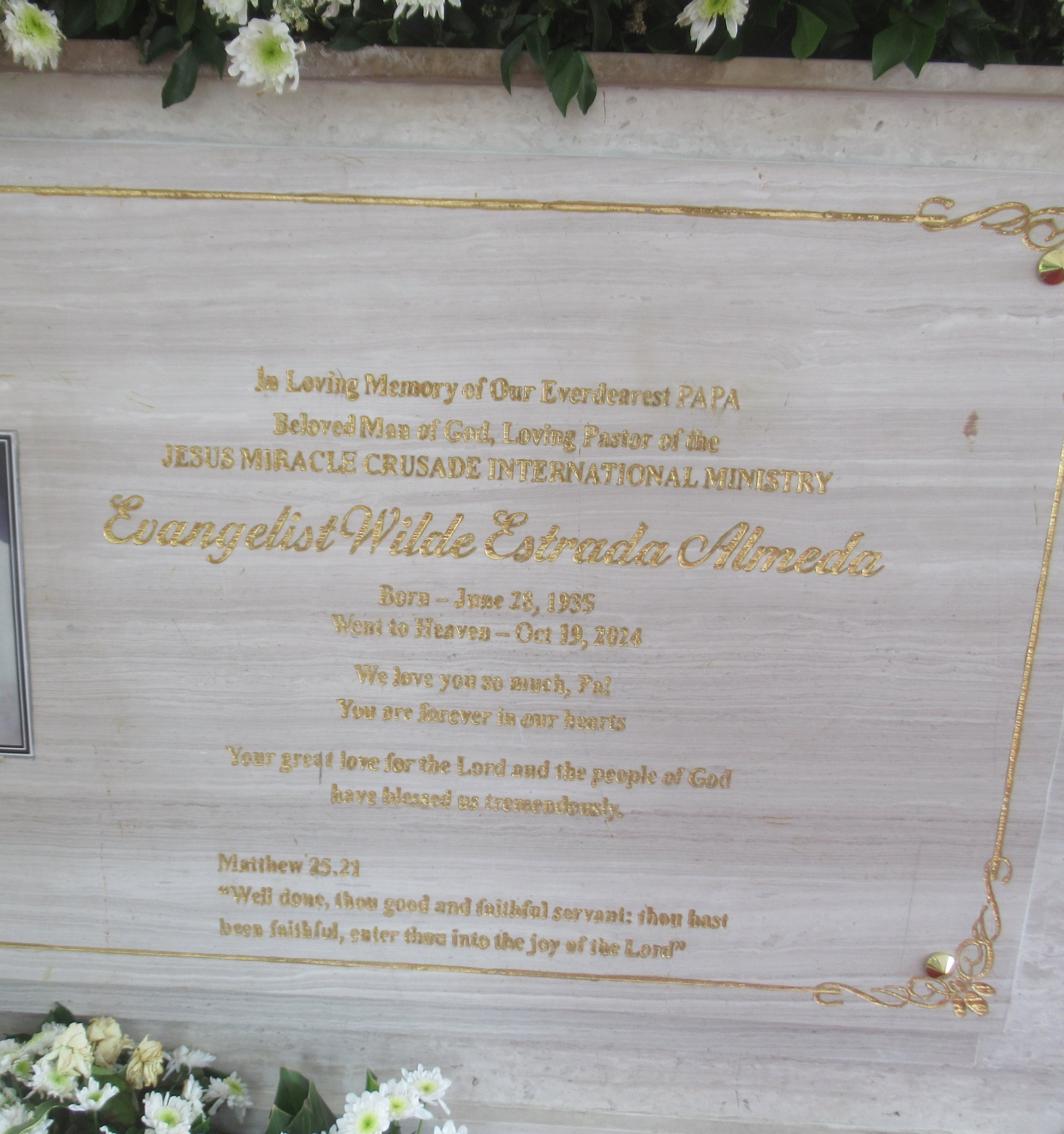
Wilde Estrada Almeda's grave at the Manila Memorial Park Holy Cross (Novaliches).
