= Khadaffy Janjalani =

Abu Sayyaf leader (1975-2006)

- حَدَفِ اَبُبَكَرْ جَنْجَلَنِ | قذافي أبو بكر جنجلاني
- Born: Khadaffy Abubakar Janjalani; March 3, 1975; Isabela, Basilan, Philippines
- Died: September 4, 2006 (aged 31); Patikul, Sulu, Philippines
- Cause of death: Gunshot wound
- Other names: Daf, Pek
- Known for: Nominal leader of the Filipino militant group Abu Sayyaf
- Predecessor: Abdurajik Abubakar Janjalani
- Successor: Radullan Sahiron

Khadaffy Abubakar Janjalani (also transliterated as Khadafy Janjalani, Khadafi Janjalani and Khaddafi Janjalani; March 3, 1975 – September 4, 2006) was a Filipino Islamist militant who was the leader of the Moro militant group known as Abu Sayyaf and the leader of one of its factions. He was a staunch follower of Salafi jihadism.

Janjalani was also known as Daf or Pek. He was a citizen of the Philippines, of Tau Sūg and Ilonggo parentage, and spoke both Tausug and Tagalog, as well as some Arabic. According to the FBI, he was quiet, reserved, indecisive and overconfident.

Janjalani was indicted in the United States District Court for the District of Columbia, for his alleged involvement in terrorist acts, including hostage kidnapping and murder, against United States nationals and other foreign nationals in and around the Republic of the Philippines. Janjalani allegedly served as the Amir or spiritual leader of Abu Sayyaf Group, which allegedly took the foreign nationals hostage.

For that indictment, on February 24, 2006, Janjalani was among six fugitives in the second and most recent group of indicted fugitives to be added to the FBI Most Wanted Terrorists list along with two fellow members of Abu Sayyaf.

The United States government offered a 5 million US Dollar (216,000,000 PHP) reward for Janjalani's capture.

On December 27, 2006, the Philippine military reported that what appeared to be Janjalani's remains had been recovered near Patikul, on Sulu Island in the southern Philippines, and that DNA tests had been ordered to confirm the discovery. As related by fellow fighters taken prisoner, he was shot in the neck in an encounter with government troops in September on Luba Hills, Patikul town, Sulu Island. On January 20, 2007, Military Chief General Hermogenes Esperon Jr. announced the identity of the corpse was confirmed, through a DNA comparison with a brother of the militant conducted by the American FBI.

== Background on Basilan birthplace ==
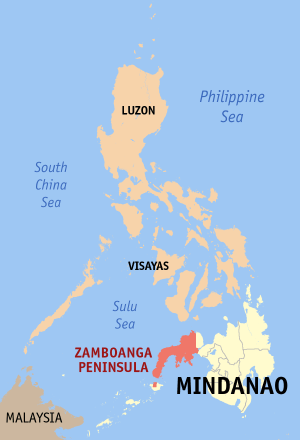
Philippines, with Zamboanga Peninsula in red, and Basilan island just below the southwestern tip.

Khadafi Abubakar Janjalani was born in 1975 in Isabela City, currently one of the smallest 4th income class cities of the Philippines. Located on the north of the island of Basilan, Isabela is also the capital of Basilan province, across the Basilan Strait from Zamboanga City. But Isabela City is administered under the Zamboanga Peninsula political region north of the island of Basilan, while the rest of the island province of Basilan is now (since 1996) governed as part of the Autonomous Region in Muslim Mindanao (ARMM) to the east.

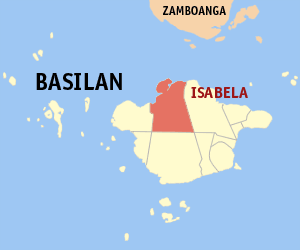
Basilan island, with Isabela City in red.

Consequently, being on the social or political division line, Isabela City and Basilan island have seen some of the fiercest fighting between government troops and the Muslim separatist group Abu Sayyaf through the early 2000s.

Before Khadafi Janjalani was born, in the early 1970s, the Moro National Liberation Front (MNLF) was the main Muslim rebel group fighting in the Basilan region of the southern Philippines.

In the late 70s, Abdurajik Abubakar Janjalani, Khadaffy Janjalani's older brother, was a former teacher from Basilan, who had studied theology and Arabic in Libya, Syria and Saudi Arabia. Abdurajik then became a veteran of the war against the Soviet Union during the Soviet–Afghan War. During that time, he allegedly met Osama bin Laden, and was given $6 million to establish his own offshoot group in the southern Philippines, out of members of the extant MNLF.

By then, as a political solution in the southern Philippines, ARMM had been created, in 1989, when the younger Janjalani was thirteen years old, growing up on Basilan.

== Abu Sayyaf Group under Abdurajak Abu Bakr Janjalani ==
His older brother Abdurajik then returned home to Basilan island in 1990, where he gathered radical members of the old MNLF, to found Abu Sayyaf Group. It was named after his own alias, which was Abu Sayyaf. MNLF had moderated into an established political party, which eventually became the ruling party of the ARMM, by its full institutionalization in 1996 on the southern Philippines island of Mindanao.

Meanwhile, Abu Sayyaf Group had started out on their own by 1991 under the leadership of the elder Janjalani brother, Abdurajik. By 1995 they had been active in large scale bombings and attacks in the Philippines, and also had become associated with Ramzi Yousef (of the 1993 World Trade Center bombing, the 1994 Philippine Airlines Flight 434 bombing, and the foiled 1995 Operation Bojinka), and also with Jemaah Islamiyah (al-Qaeda's southeast Asia associated branch led by Hambali). At some point in the early 1990s, the younger brother Khadaffy Janjalani had also joined Abu Sayyaf, as a teenager, and was eventually imprisoned by the Philippines government.

In 1995, 20-year-old Khadaffy Janjalani escaped from Camp Crame in Manila along with another member named Jovenal Bruno.

On December 18, 1998, the older brother Abdurajik Janjalani was killed in a firefight with the Philippine National Police on Basilan island. He is thought to have been about age 39 at the time of his death.

== Abu Sayyaf Group under Khadaffy Janjalani ==
The 23-year-old Khadaffy Janjalani then took power of one of Abu Sayyaf's factions in an internecine struggle. He then worked to consolidate his power within Abu Sayyaf, causing the group to appear inactive for a period. After Janjalani's supremacy was secured, Abu Sayyaf began a new tactic, as they proceeded to take hostages.

The group's motive for kidnapping became more financial and less religious during the period of Khadaffy's leadership, according to locals in the areas associated with Abu Sayyaf. The hostage money is probably the method of financing of the group.

Khadaffy Janjalani was indicted in the United States for his alleged involvement in terrorist acts, including hostage taking by Abu Sayyaf and murder, against United States nationals and other foreign nationals in and around the Republic of the Philippines.

Consequently, on February 24, 2006, Janjalani was among six fugitives in the second and most recent group of indicted fugitives to be added to the FBI Most Wanted Terrorists list along with two fellow members of Abu Sayyaf, Isnilon Totoni Hapilon and Jainal Antel Sali, Jr.

Janjalani's aliases include Khadafi Abubakar Janjalam, Khaddafy Abubakar Janjalani, Abu Muktar, Amir Khadafi Abubaker Janjalani, Khadafi Abu Muktar, Jimar Manalad Montanio, Khadafi Montanio, Abu Mochtar ("The good-hearted"), "Daf", and Omar Bin Salik.

== Death ==
News organizations in the Philippines came out with reports on December 26, 2006, about a body being dug-up in the area where Janjalani was known to be at large. On January 20, 2007, DNA test results came back confirming the body was his. Despite these results, his family believes that he is still alive and in hiding. In June 2007, the Rewards for Justice Program awarded the Philippines five million dollars for information leading to his death.
