= Baik Island =

Island in Malaysia

- Interactive map of Baik Island

Geography
- Coordinates: 4.95°N 118.25°E

Administration
- Malaysia
- State: Sabah
- Division: Tawau
- District: Lahad Datu

Baik Island (Malay: Pulau Baik) is an island located in the Celebes Sea near Lahad Datu area in Sabah, Malaysia.

== See also ==
- List of islands of Malaysia
