= Honda Bay =

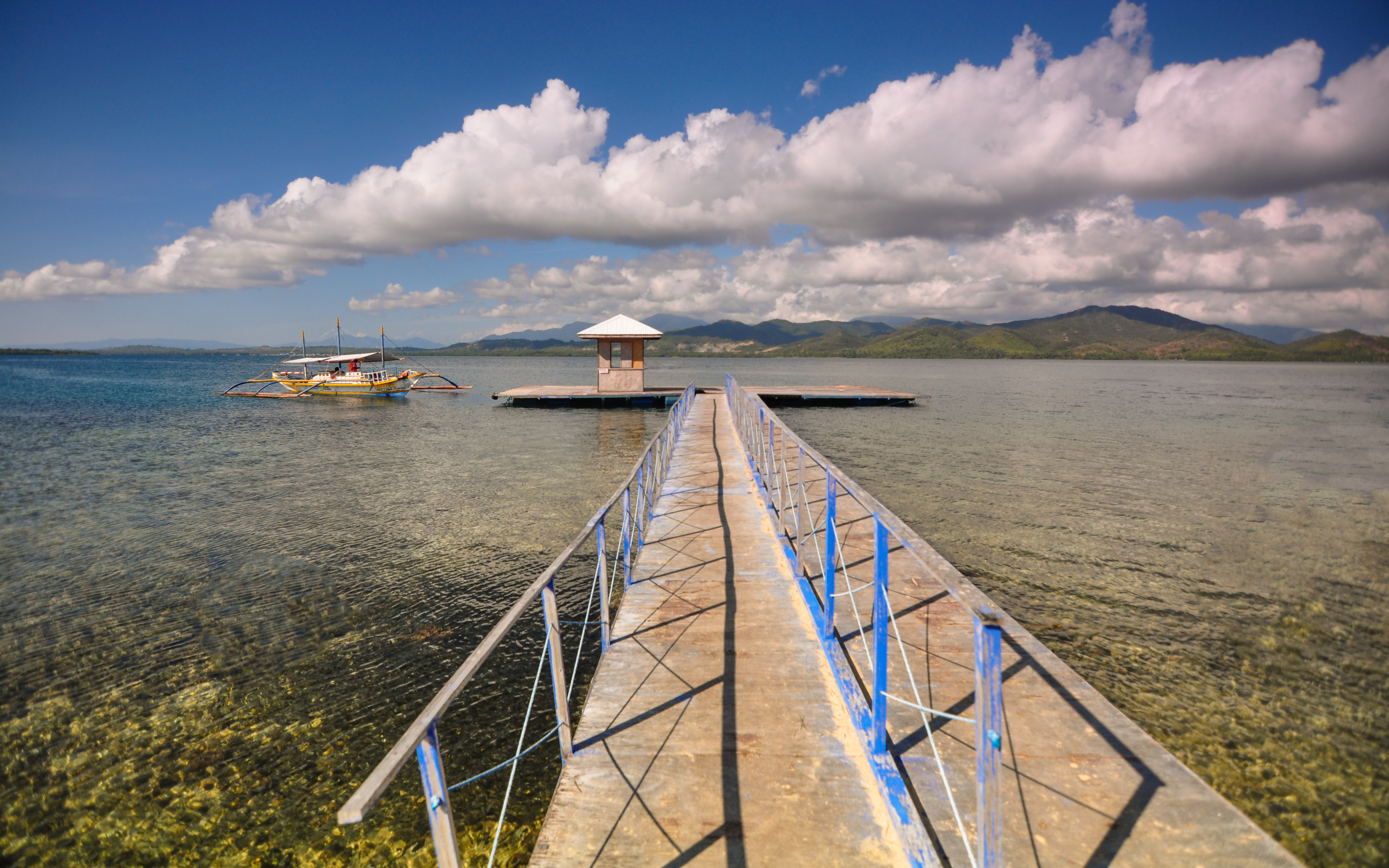

- Location within the Philippines Honda Bay (Philippines)
- Location: Palawan Island, Philippines
- Coordinates: 9°54′N 118°47′E
- Type: bay
- Settlements: Puerto Princesa

Honda Bay (Spanish: Bahía Honda, "deep bay") is a bay on the eastern shore of the island of Palawan near Puerto Princesa City in the southwestern Philippines. Numerous small islands are scattered in the bay, including Arrecife Island which is home to an upscale resort.

Dos Palmas resort in Honda Bay

The bay is used for both subsistence and commercial fisheries and recreation. Boats can be rented for the day and used for travel to nearby islands, many less than 45 minutes from the shore by boat. Honda Bay is ideal for snorkeling. Starfish are commonly found near islands such as Starfish Island. Puerto Princesa is the nearest port city, and is accessible by plane.

From 1953 to 1976 the nearby Palawan Quicksilver Mine used mine tailings from their ore extraction processes to produce a jetty at Honda Bay. The village of Sitio Honda Bay was erected on these mine tailings. Environmental studies indicate that some residents of the village and elsewhere near the mine have toxic levels of mercury in their blood.
