= Abdurajak Abubakar Janjalani =

Moro militant leader (born 1959)

- عَبْدُالرَّزَّاقْ اَبُوْ بَكَرْ جَنْجَلَانِيْ
- Born: 1959; Basilan, Philippines
- Died: December 18, 1998 (aged 38–39); Philippines
- Cause of death: Gunshot wound
- Known for: Nominal leader of the Filipino militant group Abu Sayyaf
- Successor: Khadaffy Janjalani

Abdurajak Abubakar Janjalani (1959 – December 18, 1998) was a Filipino Islamist militant who was the chief founder and leader of the Abu Sayyaf militant organization until his death in 1998 by Filipino police. Upon his death his brother, Khadaffy Janjalani, took control of the organization.

== Early life and career ==
Janjalani was born on the Filipino island of Basilan to a Tau Sūg Muslim father and a Ilonggo Christian mother; his presumed year of birth, 1959, is still subject to dispute. A former teacher, he studied theology and Arabic in Libya, Syria, and Saudi Arabia during the 1980s. He also was named "Abu Sayyaf" by his students.

== Terrorism career ==
=== Background ===
When Janjalani was born, he was raised in a time of turmoil, when much of the Moro Muslim population of the southern Philippines felt alienated and neglected and as a result angered which led to the rise of several armed Moro rebel groups fighting against the Filipino government including a warrior which was captured by the Philippine government as a pirate but was seen as a hero by his group. After an unsuccessful independence bill, he started to fight against what he saw as the "Christian government of the Philippines oppressing the Muslim minority". Following studies in Libya, he went to Afghanistan, where he was lured and allegedly trained by a terrorist group, also meeting Osama bin Laden.

=== Career ===
When he returned to the Philippines in 1990, Janjalani was able to attract many Moro Muslim youth to join his organization. Janjalani was also allegedly given $6 million by Osama bin Laden to establish the organization Abu Sayyaf as an offshoot of the wider Al-Qaeda network. Janjalani had allegedly met Bin Laden in Afghanistan in the late 1980s and allegedly fought alongside him against the Soviet Union during the Soviet-Afghan War. At the time of his death, he was the country's most wanted man, with a bounty of 1.5 million pesos on his head.
