= Dos Palmas kidnappings =

Hostage crisis in southern Philippines

- Part of the Moro conflict
- Dos Palmas Resort, Honda Bay (Philippines) Location of Dos Palmas Resort in Palawan
- Location: 09°54′45″N 118°52′39″E
- Date: May 27, 2001 – June 7, 2002 (UTC+8)
- Target: Local and foreign tourists
- Attack type: Hostage situation
- Weapons: Automatic weapons, grenades and rocket-propelled grenades
- Deaths: 40 to 77
- Injuries: 104
- Victims: Guillermo Sobero and Martin Burnham
- Perpetrator: Abu Sayyaf

A hostage crisis in southern Philippines began with the seizing of twenty hostages from the affluent Dos Palmas Resort on a private island in Honda Bay, Palawan, by members of Abu Sayyaf jihadist group on May 27, 2001, and resulted in the deaths of at least five of the original hostages. Three of the original hostages were American citizens. In the 12 months following the initial hostage taking, at least 22 Filipino soldiers were killed in attempts to apprehend the captors and free the hostages. An unknown number of captors were killed by government forces.

During the crisis, the number of captives varied greatly as more hostages were seized in numerous raids on the island of Basilan, making it impossible to determine the total number of people taken prisoner. However, contemporary news reports suggested at least 100 hostages were taken and around 20 murdered prior to the final assault and freeing of Gracia Burnham on June 7, 2002. Even some local and foreign journalists covering the high-profile kidnappings were themselves held captive for some time.

== Abduction ==
Gunmen arrived in two boats early on May 27, 2001, at a resort in Honda Bay to the north of Puerto Princesa on the island of Palawan. They abducted 20 people from the resort, including four resort staff and three Americans, identified as Martin and Gracia Burnham - missionaries from the state of Kansas who were celebrating their 18th wedding anniversary - and Guillermo Sobero, a Peruvian-born American from California. Most of those seized were Filipino tourists. The hostages and their abductors travelled hundreds of kilometres back across the Sulu Sea to the Sulu Archipelago.

== Lamitan siege ==
Four Filipino nationals of the initial twenty hostages taken from the Dos Palmas resort were able to escape prior to June 1, 2001. However, on June 2, a large group of up to 40 gunmen were able to take control of the Dr. Jose Torres Memorial Hospital and St. Peter's Church compound in the town of Lamitan, Basilan, and would later state they had taken 200 people captive. Authorities would only confirm about 20 people were seized, including patients and doctors from the hospital.

Reportedly, the remaining hostages from the initial group taken in Palawan - including all three US nationals - were held in Lamitan. Witnesses in Lamitan described helicopters and infantry units pouring rockets and machine gun fire into the hospital and church compound as troops came under fire from rooftop snipers, killing up to 12 soldiers, including an army captain. Reports indicated 22 soldiers had been killed since the initial hostages were seized.

Five more Filipino captives escaped during the fighting in Lamitan, but Abu Sayyaf had killed two hostages in the days before, one of which was beheaded. A large contingent of rebels reportedly broke through the military cordon during the night of June 4 while several members of their group stayed behind to hold their positions.

President Gloria Macapagal Arroyo vowed to fight the rebels and warned the Abu Sayyaf group to give themselves up or be killed, stating in a television broadcast, "We will finish off all the bandits if they don't surrender at the earliest possible time... to the Abu Sayyaf: You have nowhere else to run."

== Further raids ==
By June 13, the number held captive was calculated at around 28 people, as 3 more people were found beheaded on Basilan. One of the bodies was that of a Muslim cleric who had privately tried to negotiate with the kidnappers. Abu Sabaya, the Abu Sayyaf spokesman, stated he had beheaded Guillermo Sobero on the Philippine day of independence, June 12, as the security forces would not halt a rescue operation. Sobero's death was later confirmed in October 2001, after his body was found in a shallow grave in Basilan.

On August 2, 2001, suspected Abu Sayyaf militants captured 32 to 35 villagers in a raid on Balobo town in Lamitan. However, on August 5, the Philippine Army rescued 13 of the Filipino hostages, including several children, after a gun battle with the Abu Sayyaf captors. An army spokesman stated the hostages were freed before dawn, when the soldiers stormed the militants' hideout outside the town of Isabela. It was reported that the guerrillas had beheaded around 11 hostages, while several others were either released or had escaped.

According to American author Mark Bowden, Abu Sayyaf captors conducted numerous raids, "including one at a coconut plantation called Golden Harvest; they took about 15 people captive there and later used bolo knives to hack the heads off two men. The number of hostages waxed and waned as some were ransomed and released, new ones were taken and others were killed." A military spokesman stated that four children, including two 12-year-olds, were among the hostages taken from the coconut plantation in the Lantawan area of Basilan. The owners and a security guard were also taken, and two buildings, including a chapel, were burnt down during the raid a week after that in Lamitan.

== Conclusion of hostage taking ==
By October 2001, the Burnhams were among a group of 14 still being held by the guerrillas, according to three Filipino hostages who escaped from the group in mid-October. Bertram Benasing, who escaped with his 14-year-old brother Zardi and Michael Abellion, said they had walked overnight after being sent to fetch water and bananas on the island of Basilan. A video taken in November 2001 apparently showed the Burnhams in poor health, with Martin saying "each night I am chained to a tree by my left wrist."

The kidnappers demanded $1,000,000 for the release of the Americans. A ransom of $330,000 was paid, yet the kidnappers refused to release them. On June 7, 2002, after over a year in captivity, Martin Burnham and a Filipino nurse, Ediborah Yap, died in an operation to free them, while Burnham's wife Gracia was wounded. Martin sustained at least one shot to the chest. Garcia had been shot in the right thigh and underwent surgery after rescue in a military hospital in city of Zamboanga. It is unclear if they had been caught in the crossfire or intentionally shot at by the Abu Sayyaf.

Upon hearing of Martin Burnham's death, the then US President George W. Bush expressed his grief, saying, "First let me say how sad we are that Martin Burnham lost his life... I'm pleased that Mrs. Burnham is alive. That's good." Most other hostages were reportedly released for ransom.

President Arroyo defended the operation, stating that "our soldiers tried their best to hold their fire for their [the hostages'] safety. I salute our troops for their forbearance. The terror shall not be allowed to get away with this. We shall not stop until the Abu Sayyaf is finished. The battle shall go on, wherever it takes."

== Perpetrators ==
The perpetrators of the Dos Palmas kidnappings were identified as Ahmad Baky Abdullah, Adzmar Aluk, Sonny Asali, Haber Asari, Daud Baru, Abdulazzan Diamla, Tuting Hannoh, Margani Iblong Hapilon, Bas Ismael, Kamar Ilias Ismael, Alzen Jandul, Bashier Ordonez, Marvin Vincent Rueca, Guillermo Salcedo, and Jumadil "Abu Hurayra" Arad, arrested in 2010.

== Subsequent events ==
The search for the hostages eventually led to a six-month deployment of 1,000 American troops, who provided training and support to the Armed Forces of the Philippines (AFP). In July 2004, Gracia Burnham testified at a trial of eight Abu Sayyaf members and identified six of the suspects as being her erstwhile captors, including Alhamzer Limbong, Abdul Azan Diamla, Abu Khari Moctar, Bas Ishmael, Alzen Jandul and Dazid Baize.

Fourteen Abu Sayyaf members were sentenced by the Regional Trial Court – Branch 69 in Pasig to life imprisonment on December 6, 2007, as result of the attacks; four were acquitted. Limbong was later killed in a prison riot, along with two other Abu Sayyaf leaders.

On the morning of March 15, 2013, Abu Sayyaf member Jailani Basirul, who was involved in the kidnapping of 15 people from the Golden Harvest coconut plantation and had a ₱600 thousand bounty on him, was arrested in Zamboanga City by security forces.

Abu Sayyaf commander Sihata Muallom Asmad, who was involved in the Golden Harvest plantation kidnappings, had a 5.3 million peso bounty on him when police and military attempted to serve an arrest warrant on him in Parang, Sulu on November 22, 2014. He resisted arrest, leading to a firefight with the joint police-military team that resulted in his death that day. In addition to the plantation kidnappings, he was involved in the kidnappings of Jehovah's Witnesses in 2002, a Taiwanese woman in 2013, and a German couple in October 2014.

On November 23, 2016, the AFP awarded the reward money to the informant. 600,000 pesos were rewarded to another informant for providing information on Abu Sayyaf perpetrator Suhud Yakan, also involved in the plantation kidnappings, who was arrested in May 2014.

On the morning of June 16, 2016, Abu Sayyaf member Adam Muhadam/Mahamdom, a perpetrator of the Lamitan siege and the Golden Harvest kidnappings, was arrested by a joint military-police operation in a public market in Zamboanga City. He was using the alias "Junior Hali". The informant who alerted authorities to him was awarded the reward money in January 2020.

On May 8, 2018, police arrested Langa Jamil Francisco, a member of the Abu Sayyaf involved in the Golden Harvest kidnappings, in Zamboanga City, where he was a resident of Barangay Tetuan with the alias "Teng".

On February 3, 2019, two members of the Abu Sayyaf-Urban Terrorist Group involved in the plantation kidnappings, Haru Jaljalis and Pinky Ani Hadjinulla, were arrested by the National Bureau of Investigation (NBI) in Zamboanga City.

On May 16 of the same year, two Abu Sayyaf members involved in the plantation kidnappings, Azmier Maalum and Amar Assan were arrested in Taguig by a team operative from both the NBI and the Naval Intelligence and Security Group (NISG). Assan took Maalum into his household to help him avoid arrest. Three more perpetrators in the kidnappings, Musa Tahil Sampang, Jamil Ibrahim, and Yong Aming, were later arrested by the NBI. Sampang, who was also involved in the Lamitan siege, was caught in Balanga, Bataan on May 20 using two aliases due to Assan's admission, while Ibrahim and Aming were both caught in Zamboanga City under the aliases "Malangka Dawasa" and "Jamil Taib", respectively, based on gathered intelligence.

On June 5, 2019, two more Abu Sayyaf members involved in the Golden Harvest kidnappings, Canda Ibrahim Jamik and Majuk Amil, were arrested in Barangay Arena Blanco, Zamboanga City. Another Abu Sayyaf perpetrator of the kidnappings, Ibno Ismael, was captured on June 26 hiding in Maharlika Village, Taguig, while another, Totoni Hairon, was captured soon after, hiding in Port Area, Manila. Ismael took the name "Abu Kodano" and worked as a construction worker, while Hairon worked as a security guard.

== See also ==
- Captive (2016 TV series), a documentary series in which the Martin and Gracia Burnham hostage situation was featured
- Captive (2012 film), loosely based on this event
- The Marine 2 (2009 film), inspired by this event
