= Civil conflict in the Philippines =

Internal security

Date	29 March 1969 – present (57 years, 6 months, 1 week and 4 days)
Location	Philippines
Status	Ongoing: 1996 Jakarta Accord between the Government and the MNLF; 2014 Comprehensive Agreement on the Bangsamoro between the Government and the MILF; The Bangsamoro Autonomous Region in Muslim Mindanao (BARMM) is established, replacing the ARMM; Ongoing insurgency by communist rebels and jihadist groups; Multiple smaller armed groups undergoing peace processes

Belligerents
Philippines Philippines Government of the Philippines: AFP; PNP (from 1991); SAF (since 1980s); PC (until 1991); INP (1975-1991); CHDF (1977-1987); Bangsamoro (from 2019): MNLF; Bangsa Moro Army; MILF; BIAF; Marcos Loyalists (1986-1990): RAM; Guardians Brotherhood; Federal Republic of Mindanao (1990); Pro-Government Paramilitaries: Ilaga (1967-1979); New Ilaga (from 2008); Tadtad (1972-1984); Alsa Masa (1984-1987); Rock Christ; Local and provincial warlords; Foreign Support: United States	Communists; NDFP (from 1973); CPP; NPA; Rejectionists (from 1992) KR-MR rejectionists (Note: Political-Military movement led by Filemon Lagman. Not an organization.) (Note: Komiteng Rehiyon-Manila Rizal): ABB (until 1997); PMLP (2004); Partisano; RPM-P (from 1996): RPA (1996-1997); RPA–ABB (1997-2007); Kapatiran (2019 defensive only) (Note: Continued to use the label RPA-ABB until 2013 when it was dissolved.); Nilo de la Cruz Group (from 2013 defensive only); RPM-M (2001-2005); MLPP (since 1998) (later activity uncertain); RHB; CPLA (1986) Foreign support: China (until 1976); Vietnam (possibly;1970s)	Moro Rebels MNLF (until 1996): Bangsa Moro Army; Misuari loyalists (2001,2013,2020); MILF (1977-2014); BIAF; BIFF (2008-2026): Non-ISIL factions (from 2015) (Note: Only a classification.); Karialan Faction (Note: Is often attributed as a Dawlah Islamiyah Faction.); Bungos Faction (from 2018); rogue MNLF and MILF forces; Foreign support: Libya (1970s); Malaysia (1968–2001)	Jihadist groups 1991-2014: Abu Sayyaf; Jemaah Islamiyah (1993-2010s); Rajah Sulaiman Movement (until 2005); Khalifa Islamiyah Mindanao (2011-2013); Al-Khilafa Sarangani (from 2012): Maute Group (from 2013); 2014-2023 IS-Philippines: Maute Group; Abu Sayyaf; Abu Sayyaf-Hapilon Faction (until 2017); Ansar Khalifa Philippines (Note: Also known as Maguid Group.) (until 2017); AKP remnants (from 2017); BIFF-Bungos Faction (2015-2018) (Note: Continued to use the name or be referred to as Bangsamoro Islamic Freedom Fighters.); BIFF-Toraife Faction (from 2015); Hassan Group (From 2015/16); 'IS-Ranao'(Maute remnants) (from 2019); from 2023 Dawlah Islamiyah: DI-Ranao (Note: Often referred to as Maute Group); Hassan Group; Sulu Group (until 2026) (Note: often attributed as an Abu Sayyaf faction); Basilan Group (until 2026); Toraife Group (until 2026); Abu Sayyaf; AKP remnants; Jeffrey Nilong Group; Foreign Support: Al-Qaeda; Islamic State

The civil conflict in the Philippines is a series of insurgencies launched by Communist rebels, Moro rebels, and Islamists against Government forces that began in 1969 during the presidency of Ferdinand Marcos.

- NPA rebellion
- Moro conflict (until 22 February 2019)
- ISIL insurgency (since 23 July 2014)

== Clashes between communists and the national government ==
- December 2019 Borongan ambush
- August 2022 Samar boat explosion
- April 2026 Toboso encounter

== List of conflicts between the military, MNLF, and MILF ==
- February 1974 Battle of Jolo
- October 1977 Patikul massacre
- February 1981 Pata Island massacre
- February 2000 Operation Valiancy
- March 2000 Operation Audacity & subsequent 2000 Philippine campaign
- July 2000 Battle of Camp Abubakar
- November 2001 2001 Misuari rebellion
- February 2003 Battle of the Buliok Complex
- July 2007 Basilan beheading incident
- August 2007 Sulu Clashes
- August 2008 North Cotabato conflict
- October 2011 Al-Barka clash
- September 2013 Zamboanga siege
- November 2022 Ungkaya Pukan Clash
- January 2025 Basilan ambush

== List of conflicts between the military and Jihadist groups ==
- June 2001 Siege of Lamitan
- January 2002 Operation Freedom Eagle
- January 2014 Operation Darkhorse
- April 2014 Battle of Basilan
- July 2014 Islamic State Insurgency
- January 2015 Mamasapano clash
- February 2016 Butig clash
- April 2016 Battle of Tipo-Tipo
- Summer 2016 Sulu and Basilan Clashes
- November 2016 Butig clash
- January 2017 Kidapawan jail siege
- May 2017 Bohol clashes
- May 2017 Battle of Marawi
- April 2020 Battle of Danag
- May 2021 Datu Paglas Market Occupation
- 2023 Dawlah Islamiyah Insurgency

== Casualties by year ==
=== Extreme Islamists versus the government ===
Year	Government forces	Abu Sayyaf	Maute Group	BIFF	AKP	Civilians
2014		27 killed, 38 wounded in the whole year		52 killed (in Operation Darkhorse)		
2015	44 killed (in Mamasapano clash)	133 killed, 164 wounded (only in Sulu) in the whole year		139 killed (February 25 – March 22)		
2016	18+ (Battle of Tipo-Tipo in April); 15 killed (in late August)	31 killed (April 9–14); 157 killed, 159 wounded (July – December 21)	55 killed (in late February); 22 killed (May 26–28); 61 killed (November 26–30)	24 killed (in late February)		
2017		149 killed (before May 17)	15 killed (January 26); 36 killed (April 21–24)			
Battle of Marawi	168 killed	978 killed				87 civilians dead (40 due to illness)
2018	2 killed, 2 wounded		Dissolved	5 killed		
Total in 2018						
Total	228+ killed	1,578+ killed				

Note: Some casualties from small-scale conflicts are not given.
