= Operation Enduring Freedom – Philippines =

Military operation

- Part of the civil conflict in the Philippines, war against the Islamic State and Operation Enduring Freedom
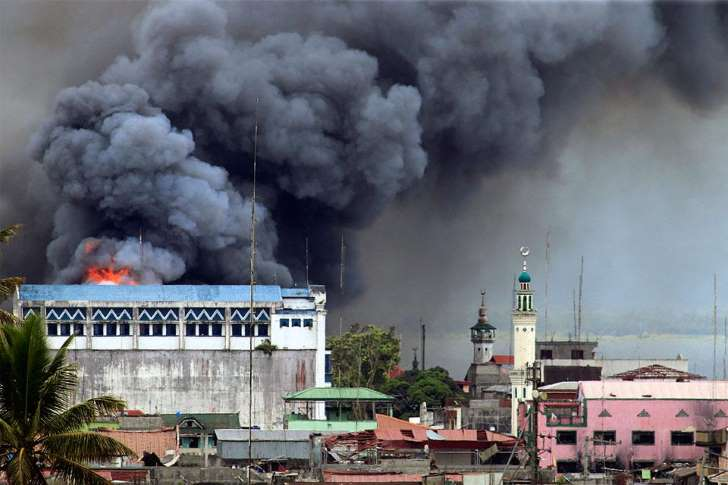
- The Siege of Marawi of 2017.
Date	15 January 2002 – 23 October 2017
Location	Mindanao, Philippines
Status	Philippine–American victory: Substantial reduction in capabilities of domestic and transnational terrorist groups operating in the Philippines; Civil conflict in the Philippines continues.

Belligerents
Philippines: Armed Forces of the Philippines; Philippine National Police; United States (advisors): United States Armed Forces; Central Intelligence Agency	Islamic jihadists: Abu Sayyaf; Bangsamoro Islamic Freedom Fighters; Maute Group; Moro Islamic Liberation Front (until 2012) (Note: Misuari faction.); Islamic state (de facto)

Commanders and leaders
Rodrigo Duterte (2016–17); Gloria Macapagal Arroyo (2001–10); Benigno Aquino III (2010–16); George W. Bush (2001–09); Barack H. Obama (2009–17); Gilberto C. Teodoro (2007–09); Donald C. Wurster (2002–11)	Isnilon Hapilon †; Abu Sabaya †; Khadaffy Janjalani †; Albader Parad †; Umbra Jumdail †; Abu Bakar Bashir (POW); Marwan † (Moro Islamic Liberation Front) Hashim Salamat # (Moro Islamic Liberation Front) Murad Ebrahim (until 2012)

Strength
500–6,000 (Advisors/Trainers); 110,000	300; 5,000

Casualties and losses
17 killed (14 accidental)	Unknown
- Causes: Moro Rebellion and 9/11 Attacks

Operation Enduring Freedom – Philippines (OEF-P) or Operation Freedom Eagle was part of Operation Enduring Freedom and the global war on terror. The Operation targeted the various Jihadist terror groups operating in the country. By 2009, about 600 U.S. military personnel were advising and assisting the Armed Forces of the Philippines (AFP) in the Southern Philippines. In addition, by 2014, the CIA had sent its elite paramilitary officers from their Special Activities Division to hunt down and kill or capture key terrorist leaders. This group had the most success in combating and capturing Al-Qaeda leaders and the leaders of associated groups like Abu Sayyaf.

== Background ==
The 1898 Treaty of Paris ended the Spanish–American War, with Spain ceding the Philippines to the United States. Islam had arrived in the Philippines before the Spanish. Spain had conquered the northern islands, and the southern islands had become the Sultanate of Sulu (which was a Spanish protectorate, but not under direct administration). The Spanish cession included the islands of Mindanao and the Sulu Archipelago, and the ceded territory included the islands of the Sultanate of Sulu located in the Philippine archipelago where slavery and piracy had for centuries been practiced by the Moros. The Spanish had established coastal garrisons but had never controlled the jungle interiors of the islands.

In 1899, U.S. Brigadier General John C. Bates negotiated the Kiram-Bates Treaty for American Sovereignty over the Moro land, which recognized and respected the position of the Sultan and the Sultanate as well as their Muslim traditions, laws, and practices with the Sultan of Sulu. After the U.S. had completed its goal of suppressing the resistance in Luzon in the Spanish–American War, it unilaterally abrogated the Bates Treaty on March 2, 1904, claiming the Sultan had failed to quell Moro resistance and that the treaty was a hindrance to the effective colonial administration of the area. Bates later confessed that the agreement was merely a temporary expedient to buy time until the northern forces were defeated.

== Major battles ==
The Zamboanga City Crisis (commonly known as the Zamboanga siege) was fought in 2014 by Philippine troops against the MILF/MNLF. It was a joint collaboration between the Philippine National Police and the Armed Forces of the Philippines. It was a turning point during this Operation. During this time, the M.N.L.F and the M.I.L.F launched a series of propaganda campaigns against the Philippine Armed Forces including through the use of social media (even if it's rare it was a big problem for there's a probability the A.F.P could lose morale. But in the end, it was a major strategic victory for the Philippine Armed Forces and the PNP.

The Marawi Siege was a siege by a coalition of nations militarily and strategically, perpetrated by the Maute Group. In the end, it cost the lives of thousands of people and displaced almost of the entire city's population to other settlements. The siege lasted for almost 200 days. The coalition of nations during the siege included China, the United States, Russia, and many other nations.

Siege of Zamboanga was a conflict which occurred during September 2013 against insurgents of the Moro National Liberation Front. It would be suppressed later in the month by combined Filipino military forces, at the cost of population displacement and damage to civilian infrastructure.

== Forces ==
Special Operations Command, Pacific (SOCPAC) troops were the core of Operation Enduring Freedom – Philippines (OEF-P), an operation which supports the Government of the Republic of the Philippines counterterrorism efforts. The AFP and civilian authorities had improved their ability to coordinate and sustain counterterrorism operations. U.S. and Philippine forces had also worked together under the new Security Engagement Board framework – the primary mechanism for consultation and planning regarding non-traditional security threats – to complete humanitarian and civil assistance projects and improve living conditions in the southern Philippines. As a result of their combined efforts, support for terrorists had waned markedly.

Deployment first began January 2002 and involved more than 1,200 members of SOCPAC, headed by Brig. General Donald C. Wurster. SOCPAC's deployable joint task force HQ, Joint Task Force 510 (JTF 510), directed and carried out the operation.

The mission was to advise the Armed Forces of the Philippines in combating terrorism in the Philippines. 160 U.S. special forces go out on patrol with Filipinos in jungles of Basilan island, an Abu Sayyaf stronghold, in 2002, U.S. military personnel deployed to Cebu to provide support for a six-month exercise. The Navy sent SEAL & Special Boat Teams to aide with maritime operations against piracy, trafficking, and port/waterways security. Mark V Special Operations Craft operated by SWCC boat operators were used to conduct Visit, board, search, and seizure operations. Some unconventional tactics and equipment were used, such as utilizing canoes with outboard motors, various small boats, and jetskis for low-profile collection operations. JSOC could undertake psychological operations to confuse or trap al-Qaeda operatives, but it needed approval from the White House for lethal action. Much of the mission (Exercise Balikatan 02–1) took place on the Basilan Island.

== Mission ==
The mission of the Joint Special Operations Task Force in the Philippines (JSOTF-P) was

To support the comprehensive approach of the Armed Forces of the Philippines (AFP) in their fight against terrorism in the southern Philippines. At the request of the Government of the Philippines, JSOTF-P works alongside the AFP to defeat terrorists and create the conditions necessary for peace, stability and prosperity.

== Combatants ==
=== United States Armed Forces ===
The United States had provided the Philippine government with advisors, equipment and financial support to counter Abu Sayyaf and Jemaah Islamiyah. In order to provide a legal basis for the presence of U.S. forces despite provisions in the 1987 Philippine constitution specifically banning the presence of foreign troops, Philippine president Gloria Macapagal Arroyo invoked the 1951 Mutual Defense Treaty between the U.S. and the Philippines. In 2013, operations began to wind down, assisting Philippine forces against Muslim rebels in September 2013. Joint Special Operations Task Force - Philippines disbanded in June 2014, ending a successful 12-year mission.

==== Timeline of American casualties ====
On 21 February 2002, the largest loss of life for U.S. forces occurred when 10 soldiers (8 from the E company, 160th SOAR and 2 from the 353rd Special Operations Group) were killed after their MH-47 crashed at sea in the Bohol Strait, southern Philippines, whilst scouting Islamic terrorists on Basilan Island.

On 2 October 2002, a bombing at an open-air market outside the gate of Camp Enrile Malagutay in Zamboanga killed a U.S. Special Forces soldier from A Company, 2nd Battalion, 1st SFG. One Filipino soldier and one civilian were also killed, and 21 people were wounded including one U.S. and two Filipino soldiers.

On 30 June 2004, a U.S. Special Forces soldier from 2nd Battalion, 1st SFG, was killed in a non-hostile incident in Manila.

On 14 October 2005, a U.S. Special Forces soldier from 5th Battalion, 4th Psychological Operations Group, U.S. Army Special Operations Command. was killed in a non-hostile incident in Makati City.

On 15 February 2007, a U.S. Marine from Combat Logistics Regiment 37, 3rd Marine Logistics Group was killed in a non-hostile incident in Jolo.

On 27 October 2007, a U.S. Special Forces soldier from 2nd Battalion, 1st SFG was killed in an accidental drowning incident at Lake Seit in the southern Philippines.

On 29 September 2009, a roadside bomb killed two U.S. Special Forces soldiers from 3rd battalion, 1st SFG and a Philippine Marine on Jolo island. Three other Philippine service members were injured in the blast. It was initially reported that the two U.S. casualties were Seabees.

=== Abu Sayyaf ===
The Abu Sayyaf Group (ASG) is deemed a "foreign terrorist organization" by the United States government. Specifically, it is an Islamist separatist group based in and around the southern islands of the Republic of the Philippines, primarily Jolo, Basilan, and Mindanao.

Since inception in the early 1990s, the group has carried out bombings, assassinations, kidnappings, and extortion in their fight for an independent Islamic state in western Mindanao and the Sulu Archipelago, with a claimed overarching goal of creating a Pan-Islamic superstate across the Malay portions of Southeast Asia, spanning, from east to west, the large island of Mindanao, the Sulu Archipelago (Basilan and Jolo islands), the large island of Borneo (Malaysia and Indonesia), the South China Sea, and the Malay Peninsula (Peninsular Malaysia, Thailand and Burma).

The name of the group is Arabic for Father (Abu) of the Sword (Sayyaf).

=== Jemaah Islamiyah ===
Jemaah Islamiyah is a militant Islamic terrorist organization dedicated to the establishment of a fundamentalist Islamic theocracy in Southeast Asia, in particular Indonesia, Singapore, Brunei, Malaysia, the south of Thailand and the Philippines.

Jemaah Islamiyah is thought to have killed hundreds of civilians and is suspected of having executed the Bali car bombing on 12 October 2002 in which suicide bombers killed 202 people, mostly Australian tourists, and wounded many in a nightclub. After this attack, the U.S. State Department designated Jemaah Islamiyah as a Foreign Terrorist Organization. Jemaah Islamiyah is also suspected of carrying out the Zamboanga bombings, the Rizal Day Bombings, the 2004 Jakarta embassy bombing and the 2005 Bali terrorist bombing.

Financial links between Jemaah Islamiyah and other terrorist groups, such as Abu Sayyaf and al-Qaeda, have been found to exist. Jemaah Islamiyah means "Islamic Group" and is often abbreviated JI.

== Balikatan training exercises ==
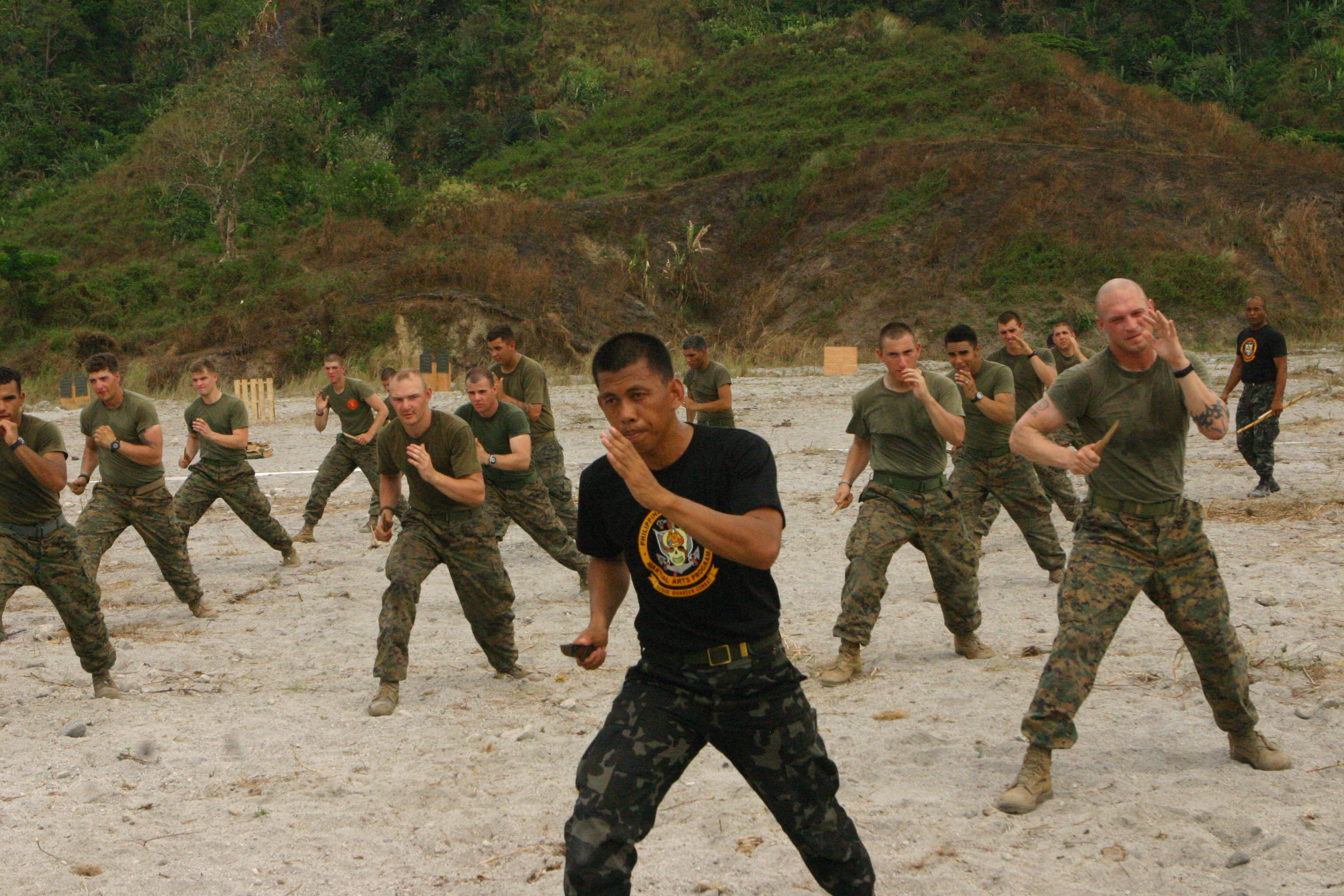
Philippine Marine Corps instructor teaching US Marines the Philippine martial art, Pekiti-Tirsia Kali, during military exercises.

The Balikatan training exercises were a part of OEF – Philippines which are mainly a series of joint training exercises between the Philippines and the United States. These training exercises are mainly taking place in Mindanao, the Spratly Islands, Tarlac, and other parts in the Philippines. The Balikatan training exercises are focused on joint training and counter-terrorist training aimed on strengthening relations between the Philippines, Moro and the United States. The Balikatan training exercises are also aimed on training Filipino forces to fight the Abu Sayyaf and other Jihadist terror groups.

There have been allegations in the Philippine press and elsewhere that visiting forces from the United States appear to have become a permanent fixture in the landscape of Zamboanga City and other parts of Mindanao. Former presidential executive secretary of the Philippines Eduardo Ermita has responded to these allegations by saying, that the U.S. soldiers "... all look alike so it’s as if they never leave," going on to say that they "... are replaced every now and then. They leave, contrary to the critics’ impression that they have not left". These remarks were made in response to statements made by Edgar Araojo, a political science professor at Western Mindanao State University, that the country had surrendered its sovereignty. In specific response, Ermita said, "Our national sovereignty and territorial integrity are intact", going on to point out that the Balikatan exercises had bolstered national and regional security, and to say that terrorists and communist rebels were "common enemies of democracy, therefore there is nothing wrong with cooperation" between the armed forces of the US and the Philippines.

== Renewed mission ==
Following the Battle of Marawi in 2017, United States Secretary of Defense James Mattis declared a new counter terrorism mission to assist in the combat against affiliates of Islamic State of Iraq and the Levant. The United Kingdom and Australia also sent forces to assist the Armed Forces of the Philippines. By August 2018, 250 Americans were involved in operations in the Philippines.

== See also ==
- Military history of the United States
- Military history of the Philippines
- Moro conflict
