= Operation Valiancy =

- Part of the Moro conflict and the 2000 Philippine campaign against the Moro Islamic Liberation Front
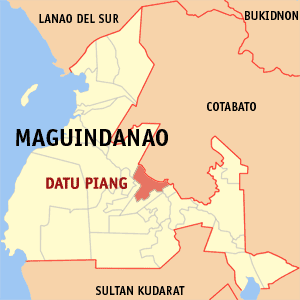
- MILF Camp Omar ibn al-Khattab, the primary objective of Operation Valiancy, was located in Datu Piang, currently in the province of Maguindanao del Sur
Date	15 February 2000 – 17 February 2000
Location	Talayan–Shariff Aguak–Datu Piang complex, Maguindanao del Sur, Philippines 7.0178°N 124.4974°E
Result	Philippine government victory

Belligerents
Philippines	Moro Islamic Liberation Front

Commanders and leaders
Gregorio Camiling Jr; Noel Coballes; Raymundo Ortezo	Ameril Umbra Kato

Units involved
Armed Forces of the Philippines; Philippine Army; 6th Infantry Division; 3rd Infantry Division; 1st Scout Ranger Regiment; Light Armor Battalion; Philippine Air Force; CTG 12, PAF	Bangsamoro Islamic Armed Forces (BIAF): 206th Brigade

Casualties and losses
2 killed (Philippine military claim) .	130 killed (Philippine military claim) .

Operation Valiancy (Filipino: Oplan Kagitingan) was the initial military operation of the 2000 Philippine campaign against the Moro Islamic Liberation Front which took place in Maguindanao (before the province's division), Philippines. The Philippine Army, primarily units of its 6th Infantry Division, assaulted Moro Islamic Liberation Front forces in the Talayan-Shariff Aguak-Datu Piang area of Maguindanao and captured Camp Omar ibn al-Khattab, its third largest camp located there. Camp Omar, named after Umar, a senior Sahabi of the Islamic prophet Muhammad, served as the headquarters of the 206th BIAF brigade under Ameril Umbra Kato and was defended by 500 guerillas. Camp Jabal Uhob, another MILF camp in the area, was also captured. Planned to be a week-long operation, Valiancy took only two days to realize its objectives.

== Plan ==
Three task groups were organized for the operation. The 301st Infantry Brigade formed the core of the first (TG "A"), while the 601st Infantry Brigade did the same for the second (TG "B"). The third was a reserve force (TG "C"). The infantry was supported by artillery and Philippine Air Force units under 6th Infantry Division control.

The operation was to be conducted in two phases. The first phase called for Task Group "A" to attack and clear Camp Omar. Task Group "B" would act as a blocking force to prevent withdrawal from and reinforcement to Camp Omar. The second phase of the operation involved TG "A" attacking and clearing Camp Jabal Uhob; TG "B" would support clearing operations.

== Battle ==
The attack on the two MILF camps progressed as planned. TG "A" was successful in assaulting and clearing both MILF camps, as TG "B" supported the effort. TG "C" secured the firebases that provided artillery support for TG "A". Philippine Air Force's Composite Tactical Group 12 provided air support, medical evacuation, resupply and troop insertion missions.

== Aftermath ==
MILF camps Omar and Jabal Uhob, along with a cache of weapons and equipment, were captured by the government forces. The operation lasted two days, as opposed to the planned week-long effort. The quick defeat of the MILF forces under Ameril Umbra Kato reportedly prompted his demotion from field commander to a classroom instructor. Casualties were light on the government side; two dead as opposed to the MILF losses - 130 killed in action.

== See also ==
- 2000 Philippine campaign against the Moro Islamic Liberation Front
- Bangsamoro peace process
- Bangsamoro Islamic Freedom Fighters
- Moro conflict
