= 2007 August Sulu clashes =

Armed incident in the Philippines

Coordinates: 6°29′51″N 122°7′7″E

- Part of Islamic insurgency in the Philippines
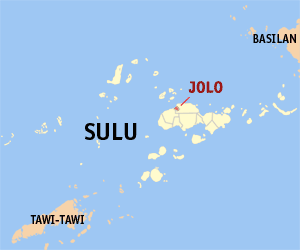
- Map of Sulu
Date	August 7, 2007 - August 9, 2007
Location	Sulu, Maimbung, Indanan, Philippines
Result	Philippine Army suffers Heavy casualties in the clashes

Belligerents
Philippines: Armed Forces of the Philippines; 33rd Infantry Battalion	rogue MNLF members Abu Sayyaf

Commanders and leaders
Col. Antonio Mark Supnet	Hatimil Hassan; Radullan Sahiron; Albader Parad; Umbra Jumdail (Alias Dr. Abu) (WIA)

Strength
Unspecified	120

Casualties and losses
26-44 killed (10-13 in Maimbung) (1 killed in Parang) (15-30 in Indanan); 17 wounded	27-31 killed (Philippine Army claim); 1 killed (confirmed)

The 2007 August Sulu clashes refers to the series of clashes and ambushes in Sulu from 7th to the 10th of August 2007, culminating on 9 August 2007, Between soldiers of the Philippine Army and Rogue members of the Moro National Liberation Front under the command of Hatimil Hassan, as well as Abu Sayyaf militants under the command of Radullan Sahiron and Albader Parad. The casualties were incurred in multiple engagements involving the 33rd Infantry Battalion of the Armed Forces of the Philippines, including the Maimbung ambush (10-13 soldiers killed) and a later pursuit operation near Indanan (15-30 soldiers killed), with one soldier having been killed the previous day, bringing the total to 26-44 soldiers, 27-31 MNLF and Abu Sayyaf members were killed during the clashes according to Philippine Army, One body of a rebel was recovered or confirmed. The clash was marked as one of the deadliest encounters between Philippine Government troops and Moro islamic militants during the Moro conflict.

== Background ==
According to military accounts, troops launched operations to pursue Abu Sayyaf fighters in Indanan. During the first encounter on 7 August, Marines engaged the militants on Mount Tubora

On August 9, Members of the 33rd Infantry Battalion on board a military truck were on an 'administrative movement' when they were ambushed by an undetermined number of gunmen at about 7:45 a.m. Reports stated that the soldiers were on their way to buy groceries.

== Clash ==
On the 7th of August 2007, elements of the 3rd Marine Brigade encountered Abu Sayyaf fighters on Mount Tubora in Indanan, Sulu during combat operations. The firefight wounded 2 and killed 15 to 30 soldiers, the militants withdrew into the mountainous terrain of the area. The encounter was marked as the start of the series of clashes that escalated over the following days.

On August 8, 2007, two platoons of the 33rd Infantry Battalion engaged an unknown number of Abu Sayyaf militants in Upper Sampunay, Parang, Sulu, at around 6:30 a.m The gunfight left one soldier dead and five others wounded. Philippine Military officials initially reported no confirmed militant casualties. The clash occurred as troops continued its offensive operations against the Abu Sayyaf rebels in Sulu and preceded the Maimbung ambush the following morning.

On August 9, 2007, soldiers of the 33rd Infantry Battalion of the Philippine Army were traveling aboard a military truck near Maimbung, Jolo Island, Sulu, on a mission to purchase food and other provisions when they were ambushed at around 7:45 a.m. by numerous armed Moro militants. The attackers opened fire on the convoy, killing nine soldiers and wounding two others in a brief but intense engagement, one of whom later died in the hospital

The assailants reportedly seized Six M16 rifles and a military field radio before withdrawing. Reinforcements, including helicopters, were dispatched to evacuate the casualties and pursue the assailants.

Military officials later claimed that the ambush may have involved a force of Abu Sayyaf "bandits" and rogue members of the MNLF.

== Aftermath ==
Following the clash, the Philippines began launching "offensives" against Islamist insurgents of Abu Sayyaf as a response to the recent clashes.

President Arroyo reportedly stated that she was "unimpressed" with the Armed Forces of the Philippines, due to heavy casualties being inflicted onto the Philippine Army by rebels over the past months, with the Incident being a few months after the killing and beheadings of over 11 Philippine army marines in Basilan Island, in July 10.

President Gloria Macapagal Arroyo ordered Armed Forces of the Philippines (AFP) chief General Hermogenes Esperon Jr. to review the military's operational policies after the Philippine Army's heavy losses in Sulu.

The Armed Forces of the Philippines reinforced its forces in Sulu by sending another Army battalion to augment the 33rd Infantry Battalion after the heavy losses. Army officials stated that the battalion would be reconstituted before continuing operations against Abu Sayyaf militants.

The military also continued operations against Abu Sayyaf and its allies. President Arroyo ordered Army commander Lieutenant General Romeo Tolentino to oversee operations in Western Mindanao, while the AFP pledged to continue pursuing the militants despite the casualties.

In the following days, AFP chief General Hermogenes Esperon said the military was coordinating with the Moro National Liberation Front (MNLF) leadership to separate MNLF forces from Abu Sayyaf, allowing the Armed Forces of the Philippines to conduct targeted operations against the Abu Sayyaf group.

A later U.S. Special Operations Forces study mentioned that during summer in the year 2008, Joint Task Force Comet and its U.S. counterpart were attempting to reduce Abu Sayyaf's influence on Sulu and restrict its access to local populations

The KAWAGIB report in December 14 2007, reported that tens of thousands of civilians were displaced in 3 operations carried out by the Philippine army against forces under MNLF commander Habier Malik and Khaid Ajibun in the aftermath of the clash, three Marine brigades had been reportedly deployed to Sulu and Basilan since August 2007, with more than 10,000–12,000 troops deployed for an Operation carried out by the Philippine Army named "Oplan Ultimatum."

The Incident carried out by members of the Abu Sayyaf group and MNLF rogues, was reportedly said to be "the heaviest fighting in Sulu since 2005" and "the largest number of casualties on a single day over the past few years."

Army Colonel Mark Antonio Supnet identified that Abu Sayyaf commanders, Albader Parad and "Doctor Abu" were among the Moro extremist leaders involved in the clash.
