= Bangsamoro (disambiguation) =

The Bangsamoro Autonomous Region in Muslim Mindanao (BARMM) is an autonomous region in the Philippines.

Bangsamoro may also refer to:

- Bangsamoro Organic Law, the law that established the BARMM
- Moro people, also known as the Bangsamoros, a group of Muslim people within the ethnic indigenous tribes in Southeast Asia
- Bangsamoro Republik, a short-lived breakaway state declared by the Moro National Liberation Front in 2013
- Bangsamoro Islamic Freedom Fighters, a militant organization based in Mindanao, Philippines
