= 2008 Cotabato conflict =

2008 battle in the Philippines

2008 Battle of Cotabato
- Part of the Moro conflict
Date	August 9, 2008 – Late August 2008
Location	Cotabato, Philippines
Result	Government forces retake control of villages held by rebels; Eventual establishment of Bangsamoro Islamic Freedom Fighters (BIFF)

Belligerents
Philippines: Armed Forces of the Philippines; Philippine National Police; Civilian Volunteer Organizations and Paramilitary Units; Christian Militias	Moro Islamic Liberation Front

Commanders and leaders
PC/SUPT Felizardo Serapio; Lt. Col Angel Benitez †	Umbra Kato; Abdullah Makapaar; Alvin Canto (surrendered)

Strength
2,500-3,000 troops and policemen	1,000 rebels

Casualties and losses
5 killed 31+ wounded (Government claim) 57 militia casualties (MILF claim)	31 killed 5 wounded (Government claim) 4 killed (MILF claim) at least 31 surrendered
- >104 to 400 civilians killed by members of the MILF

The 2008 Battle of Cotabato was a military confrontation between the Armed Forces of the Philippines and a rogue Moro Islamic Liberation Front (MILF) faction under the command of Umbra Kato in Cotabato, a province of Mindanao, in the Philippines.

== Conflict ==
A thousand MILF rebels under the command of Umbra Kato seized control of thirty-five villages in Cotabato. Two thousand Philippine troops with helicopters and artillery were sent to the seized area on August 9 to liberate it from the rebels. The MILF had wanted Cotabato to be included in the Autonomous Region in Muslim Mindanao (ARMM). The Filipino government and MILF had been negotiating for the inclusion of the province, but the Supreme Court of the Philippines had struck down the proposal after hearing concern from local Christian leaders in the region. The attacks caused 22,000 people to flee from their homes.

Members of the Moro Islamic Liberation Front began launching attacks against civilians, Targeting Predominantly Christian and sometimes, mixed Christian-Muslim communities. The Philippine military reported that most of the civilian casualties were inflicted by the rebels.

Moro rebels were accused of using guns and machetes to kill Christian villagers, and using children as soldiers, more than 610,000 civilians fled their homes. The series of attacks reportedly resulted in the deaths of 104 to 400 people.

The rebel troops were ordered to leave the area by their commanders, but the contingents under Kato refused to leave the villages they had occupied. The Philippine Army responded on August 9 by bombarding them. The next day, the government forces moved to retake the villages, recapturing two of them from the rebels.

On August 19, Alvin Canto, a Sub-Commander of the Moro Islamic Liberation Front who led the group's 2nd Battalion surrendered along with 30 other men and also surrendered several high-powered firearms

On August 28, 2008, The Ilaga faction in Aleosan led by Felimon Cayang, alias Commander Max, threatened to launch raids and attacks on positions of the Moro Islamic Liberation Front as retaliation for the deaths of Christians, they swore to kill 10 MILF rebels for every single Christian civilian slain

Mike Santiago, A spokesperson for the Ilaga in August 29 said that the Ilaga would protect Civilian lives and property that were under attack from the MILF

The Armed Forces of the Philippines set up Military Checkpoints over the Cotabato-Davao City Road in order to catch the group led by Umbra Kato.

== Aftermath ==
The main road from Cotabato to Davao City was temporarily closed regarding the military checkpoints.

The conflict between the Philippine Army and Rogue Moro militants continued til the following year

as a result of the violence and attacks, around 1,000 were killed between August 2008 to July 2009, and 750,000 were displaced.

In 2009, a year after the conflict occurred, A 45-page report stated that at least 548 soldiers were killed and 49 others were wounded during the 10 months of fighting between Moro rebels and the Philippine military.

President Arroyo and officials suspended military operations to suppress the rogue militants, hoping that the MILF would reciprocate.

== Spillover of the Conflict ==
In the 18th of August 2008, hundreds of kilometres away from North Cotabato, forces under MILF commander Abdullah Macapaar, alias "Commander Bravo," launched more attacks in the towns of Lanao del Norte province, killing and injuring hundreds of civilians.

Local organizations documented several incidents of rebels under Abdullah Macapaar, targeting civilians in attacks, including MILF attacks on farmers in North Cotabato province and on civilians in the towns of Kauswagan and Kolambugan in Lanao del Norte province on the 18th of August, killing dozens of people, and possibly reaching up to 70.
