= Operation Audacity =

- Part of the Moro conflict and the 2000 Philippine campaign against the Moro Islamic Liberation Front
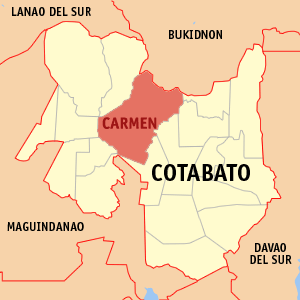
- Operation Audacity aimed to clear MILF forces from the Carmen-Banisilan area of Cotabato.
| Date | 15 March 2000 – 21 March 2000 |
| Location | Carmen–Banisilan complex, Cotabato, Philippines 7.3826°N 124.8183°E |
| Result | Philippine government victory |

Belligerents
| Philippines | Moro Islamic Liberation Front |

Commanders and leaders
| Gregorio Camiling Jr; Noel Coballes; Raymundo Ortezo | Unknown |

Units involved
| Armed Forces of the Philippines; Philippine Army; 6th Infantry Division; 1st Scout Ranger Regiment; Light Armor Battalion; Philippine Air Force; Composite Task Group 12 | Bangsamoro Islamic Armed Forces (BIAF) |

Casualties and losses
| 2 killed (Philippine military claim) | 5 killed (Philippine military claim) |

Operation Audacity (Filipino: Oplan Pagpangahas) was a military operation during the 2000 Philippine campaign against the Moro Islamic Liberation Front which took place in Cotabato, Philippines. The Philippine Army, primarily units of its 6th Infantry Division, assaulted and cleared Moro Islamic Liberation Front forces from the Carmen-Banisilan area of Cotabato.

== Plan ==
Three task groups were organized for the operation. The 602nd Infantry Brigade formed the core of the first (TG "A"), while the 603rd Infantry Brigade did the same for the second (TG "B"). The third was a reserve force (TG "C"). The infantry was supported by artillery and Philippine Air Force units under 6th Infantry Division control.

== Battle ==
TG "A" moved northwest toward the Maladugao River and clashed with the MILF forces east of the river. TG "B" moved north towards the eastern slopes of Mt. Table, occupying the high ground. TG "C" secured their areas of operation and prevented the conflict from spreading to neighboring municipalities. Philippine Air Force's Composite Tactical Group 12 provided air support, medical evacuation, resupply and troop insertion missions.

== Aftermath ==
The government forces achieved all their mission objectives. Casualties were light on both sides with two government troopers dead and five MILF killed.

== See also ==
- 2000 Philippine campaign against the Moro Islamic Liberation Front
- Bangsamoro peace process
- Moro conflict
