= Datu Paglas market occupation =

2021 battle in Maguindanao, Philippines

- Part of the Moro conflict
Date	May 8, 2021
Location	Datu Paglas Public Market, Datu Paglas, Maguindanao, Philippines
Result	Public market retaken by the Philippine Army

Belligerents
Philippines: Bangsamoro	Bangsamoro Islamic Freedom Fighters

Commanders and leaders
Juvymax R. Uy (6th Infantry Division); Roy Galido (601st Infantry Brigade) Abubakar Paglas (Datu Paglas mayor)	Undo Sulayman

Units involved
Philippine Army: 6th Infantry Division; 601st Infantry Brigade; Philippine National Police	Karialan faction

Strength
Unknown	20-200 participants

Casualties and losses
None reported	5 wounded
- 5,000 people displaced

On May 8, 2021, Bangsamoro Islamic Freedom Fighters insurgents occupied the public market of the municipality of Datu Paglas in Maguindanao, Philippines, forcing many residents to evacuate.

== Background ==
The public market in Datu Paglas was occupied by members of the Bangsamoro Islamic Freedom Fighters, particularly from a faction led by Kagi Karialan which is largely based in the Ligawasan Marsh. The BIFF militants reportedly arrived early morning May 7, on board five cargo trucks. The insurgents were allowed to stay in town by the local government out of goodwill since at that time Ramadan is being observed provided they do not harm any civilians. It was originally thought that around 100 BIFF members were involved, an estimate provided to the military by the Moro Islamic Liberation Front, a former rebel group which leads the Bangsamoro autonomous regional government. Although the military concludes from information relayed to them by the Datu Paglas local government that there were only 20 BIFF members involved. The BIFF is estimated to have 200 active members operating in Central Mindanao at the time of the incident.

The Karialan faction has suffered from loses in 2021 alone. From January 17 to April 28, 17 members of the group were killed in 13 separate encounters with the Philippine Army 6th Infantry Division. Thirty-one BIFF members also surrendered and left the group due to backchannel talks initiated by local leaders and commanders of the military division.

The military says that BIFF were retreating after it launched operations against the group in the SPMS Box, an area in the Maguindanao, for the past two weeks prior to the occupation. The military claims that the BIFF's occupation of the market was a move to gather food supply for the group. BIFF spokesperson Abu Jehad, in an interview after the occupation, said that his group had no intentions to seize the town and were just resting since they were fasting for Ramadan.

The BIFF group which occupied the market is led by Undo Sulayman, a former member of the Sangguniang Kabataan (youth council) of Datu Paglas who married a close relative of BIFF faction leader Karialan.

On April 22, 2024, Major General Alex Rillera and Brig. Gen. Jose Vladimir Cagara, 6th Infantry Division commanders, BIFF spokesperson Abu Supyan, and Mayor Edris A. Sindatok confirmed that "Mohiden Animbang" aka Kagi Karialan, leader of a Karialan of the BIFF, his brother Saga, including outlawed 10 slain terrorists were recovered in a Barnagay Kitango, Datu Saudi Ampatuan swampy area with 12 assorted high-powered firearms. In March, Abu Halil, the training officer of BIFF-Karialan Faction was also killed.

== Occupation and siege ==
The Philippine Army sent troops of the 601st Infantry Brigade of the 6th Infantry Division to Datu Paglas to check the presence of the BIFF in the municipality. The 601st Infantry Brigade is led by Gen. Roy Galido. They launched an operation against the BIFF in the evening of May 7, 2021. The BIFF in response went to occupy the Datu Paglas public market at around 4 a.m. the following day where they adopted defensive positions. The military along with the police surrounded the area occupied by the BIFF. The military allowed local leaders to negotiate with the insurgents to minimize any casualties while at the same time preparing to attack. Datu Paglas Mayor Abubakar Paglas who is also a datu was involved in the talks.

At 4:30 am, the BIFF blockaded the Datu Paglas–Tulunan road which connects the town to Tulunan, Maguindanao using a cargo truck. Some members also occupied Gawad Kalinga housing units meant for civilians, although the BIFF did not take anyone hostage.

The BIFF reportedly left the public market after talks of the group with the Datu Paglas Mayor. There were conflicting reports if the negotiations were successful. The talks was credited for preventing an armed confrontation altogether. Another report claimed that talks fell apart after a BIFF member opened fire at a police personnel who was sent to ensure the safety of residents in the vicinity and that around 9 a.m., the Philippine military launched land and aerial assaults on the BIFF's position. After an hour, the military was able to regain control of the public market.

== Aftermath ==
Around 5,000 people were displaced in Datu Paglas during the incident. As part of the clearing operations, the military was able to safely disarm and dispose four improvised bombs in the public market and national highway areas. The national road linking Maguindanao and Cotabato, which was barred during the occupation, was reopened to the public by noon of the same day. No civilian or military casualties were reported although accounts by Datu Paglas residents said that at least five BIFF members sustained wounds serious enough that they had to be carried away by their compatriots when the group abandoned the market.

The military declared that the situation in Datu Paglas was restored to normalcy by 2:00pm.

President Rodrigo Duterte on May 11 appealed the local autonomous government of Bangsamoro to help the national government deal with the BIFF, or otherwise he may be forced to declare an "all-out offensive" against the group if local officials are unable to control the situation.

== See also ==
- 2016 Butig clashes
- Battle of Marawi
- Mamasapano clash
- Zamboanga City crisis
