= Operation Darkhorse =

2014 Philippine offensive in the Moro conflict

- Part of the Moro conflict
Date	January 27 – February 2, 2014 (6 days)
Location	Maguindanao del Sur and Cotabato, Philippines
Result	Philippine government victory: Temporary stops in BIFF and government offensives.

Belligerents
Philippines: Armed Forces of the Philippines; Philippine National Police; Moro Islamic Liberation Front (support)	Bangsamoro Islamic Freedom Fighters

Commanders and leaders
(Philippines) Benigno Aquino III (Philippines) Emmanuel Bautista (Philippines) Edmund Pangilinan (Philippines) Edgar Gonzales	Ameril Umbra Kato; Ustadz Karialan; Abu Misry Mama

Units involved
Philippine Army; Scout Rangers; 6th Infantry Division; 601st Infantry Brigade; 1st Mechanized Brigade; 40th Infantry Battalion; 7th Infantry Battalion	Unknown

Casualties and losses
1 killed 20 wounded	52 killed
- Civilians injured: 8 Civilians displaced: 35,334

Operation Darkhorse Oplan Darkhorse
- Part of the South Philippines insurgency
- Location: Maguindanao del Sur and Cotabato, Philippines
- Target: Bangsamoro Islamic Freedom Fighters
- Objective: Target BIFF positions and arrest several BIFF key people
- Executed by: Armed Forces of the Philippines; Philippine National Police; Moro Islamic Liberation Front (support)

Operation Darkhorse (Filipino: Oplan Darkhorse) was an offensive against the Bangsamoro Islamic Freedom Fighters (BIFF) launched by the Armed Forces of the Philippines on January 27, 2014.

== Background ==
The fighting broke just as the normalization annex of the Bangsamoro Framework Agreement was signed between the Philippine government and the Moro Islamic Liberation Front (MILF). Col. Dickson Hermoso, spokesman of the Army’s 6th Infantry Division, claimed that the offensive was not related to the signing of the annex of the peace treaty and said that the government has been collaborating with the MILF to launch an offensive against the BIFF even before the signing of the annex. The government offensive was part of an effort to arrest various BIFF leaders including its leader, Umbra Kato for various crimes. The Philippine National Police has issued a warrant of arrest for various BIFF leaders. Hermoso described the offensive as a "law enforcement" effort by government forces.

The offensive is part of Joint Ad Hoc Joint Action Group, a joint effort by the Philippine government and the MILF to eliminate lawless elements from MILF communities.

== The offensive ==
=== January 28 ===
Philippine military launched an artillery attack on BIFF targets with 105-mm howitzers. The military also conducted airstrikes. At least 20 BIFF members were killed according to the government. BIFF spokesperson, Abu Misry Mama denied that there were casualties on their side.

=== January 29 ===
BIFF spokesman, Abu Misry Mama said that the BIFF is open for negotiations with the government. He said that the BIFF is disappointed with the treatment of the government of their group. He said that the government keeps sending heavily armed forces to their communities on which he said forces the BIFF to retaliate. The BIFF wants a "straight to the point" and "direct" peace negotiation compared to the negotiations between the Philippine Government and the MILF, according to the spokesman. Mama added that the BIFF longs for an independent state where everyone is equal. Col Dickson Hermoso, spokesman of the 6th Infantry Division, turned down the BIFF's request for negotiations and said that the BIFF must first face criminal charges against them.

=== January 31 ===
Lt. Col. Ramon Zagala, Armed Forces public affairs office chief said that government forces has seized at least five strategic BIFF camps. He identified the following locations; the headquarters in Barangay Dasawao, Shariff Saydona Mustapha, a training facility in Barangay Ganta, Shariff Saydona Mustapha, an improvised explosive device factory in Barangay Ganta, Shariff Saydona Mustapha and advance posts in Barangay Bakat, Shariff Saydona Mustapha and Barangay Damablas in Datu Piang. The casualties according to government forces includes 53 BIFF fighters, including 3 child soldiers and one soldier from the Philippine government side. The BIFF continues to deny that there were casualties on their side.

=== February 1 ===
The government planned to end the offensive on February 1, the second deadline set by the Joint Ad Hoc Joint Action Group. BIFF spokesman Abu Misry Mama said that they captured and torched an armored personnel carrier (APC). The spokesman said that they can't utilize the vehicle due to the lack of roads in their area so they decided to torch the vehicle after removing the 50-caliber machine gun attached to the vehicle

Government forces captured the main stronghold of the BIFF in Barangay Ganta, Shariff Saydona Mustapha. The flag of the Philippines was raised at the former BIFF camp.

=== February 2 ===
The Armed Forces of the Philippines formally ended Operation Darkhorse. Col. Dickson Hermoso, 6th Infantry Division spokesman, claimed that the government forces has significantly lowered the morale of BIFF fighters following the capture of at least four strategic BIFF camps. The military declared that civilians displaced due to the operation may now return to their homes. The military added that their law enforcement operations will continue despite the formal conclusion of Operation Darkhorse.

There is no official confirmation that Ameril Umbra Kato, leader of the BIFF was killed or captured during the military operation.

== Humanitarian concerns ==
9,465 families or 35,334 people were displaced due to the clashes, with most of them coming from Shariff Saydona Mustapha, Rajah Buayan, Datu Piang in Maguindanao del Sur and Pikit in Cotabato. Some areas where the displaced persons may need to be rehabilitated. The military has vowed "speedy reconstruction" of affected areas after the conclusion of the military offensive.

It was also reported that three child soldiers of the BIFF were killed during the operations. The Philippine government condemned the reported use of child soldiers by the BIFF as a violation of human rights.
