= 2001 Misuari rebellion =

Misuari-led MNLF rebellion

- Part of the Moro conflict
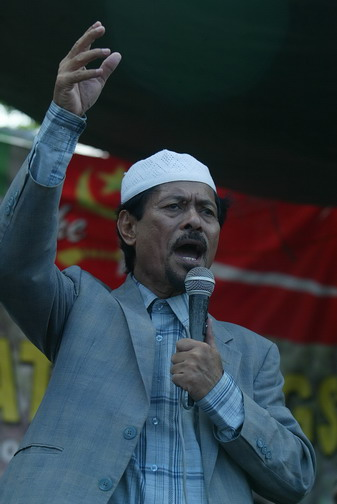
- Nur Misuari in 2009
Date	November 19–22, 2001
Location	began in Jolo, Sulu, Philippines 6.0474°N 121.0090°E
Result	Philippine government victory: Misuari flees to Sabah, Malaysia

Belligerents
Philippines: Armed Forces of the Philippines	Moro National Liberation Front (Misuari faction)

Commanders and leaders
(Philippines) Gloria Macapagal Arroyo	(Moro National Liberation Front) Nur Misuari

Casualties and losses
- 100 – 160 combatants and civilians killed or wounded

The 2001 rebellion of the Moro National Liberation Front Misuari faction against the Philippine government during the presidency of Gloria Macapagal Arroyo was led by Nur Misuari, the founder of the Moro National Liberation Front (MNLF). It began on November 19, 2001, when members of a faction of the MNLF loyal to Misuari attacked a Philippine Army headquarters in Jolo, Sulu in the Philippines. The attack was meant to disrupt the Autonomous Region in Muslim Mindanao elections scheduled for November 26 of that year, which eventually replaced Misuari as governor.

== Background ==
In 1996, Nur Misuari signed a peace agreement with the Philippine government that led to the creation of the Autonomous Region in Muslim Mindanao (ARMM); Misuari eventually became its first governor. In April 2001, Misuari was ousted as MNLF chair by his colleagues, who cited his incompetent performance as ARMM governor. He was replaced by the "Committee of Fifteen", which is the central leadership of the MNLF. Then-President Gloria Macapagal Arroyo also cited Php 43 billion worth of funds for the ARMM that remained unaccounted for.

Arroyo then chose Dr. Parouk Hussin, a member of the "Committee of Fifteen", as the administration's candidate as ARMM governor. Hussin eventually won the post and stated that he would focus on an audit of the region's fiscal and property resources. Apparently offended by his ouster from the MNLF leadership, as well as losing the ARMM governor's post and facing a fiscal audit for missing public funds, Misuari declared war on the Arroyo government on November 19, 2001.

== The rebellion ==
The Philippine government stated that Misuari then launched an armed rebellion on the island of Jolo to undermine elections for his position as ARMM governor. MNLF members loyal to Misuari began attacking Philippine Army outposts; the hostilities caused a hundred fatalities, most of whom were Misuari's men. Many were wounded, including civilians.

In Zamboanga City, 300 MNLF men led by Julhambri Misuari, Nur Misuari's nephew, took over the Cabatangan government complex and held the residents of the neighborhood hostage, marching them around the city roped together, until they were allowed to leave unmolested by government forces which had ringed the city outskirts.

== Aftermath ==
The Philippine government filed rebellion charges against Nur Misuari in a Sulu court. Misuari initially escaped the military dragnet; there were reports that he had sought refuge in Sabah, Malaysia. Other reports stated that the Abu Sayyaf was hiding him in Jolo. Misuari was captured by Royal Malaysia Police forces a few days after the fighting and extradited back to the Philippines. He was charged with rebellion but was eventually released. In 2008, the rebellion charges against him were dropped.

Five years later, an armed incursion into Zamboanga City by forces loyal to Nur Misuari led to the 2013 Zamboanga City crisis.

== See also ==
- Bangsamoro Republik
- Zamboanga City crisis
