= 2025 Basilan ambush =

Ambush in the Philippines

- Part of Moro conflict
- Map of Basilan where the incident took place
Date	January 22, 2025
Location	Sumisip, Basilan, Philippines

Belligerents
Philippine Government	"Lawless elements" rogue MILF members

Commanders and leaders
Lt. Col. Edmond S. Lanzar	Najal Buena; Oman Hajal Jali

Units involved
32nd Infantry Battalion	unknown

Casualties and losses
2 killed 12 wounded 1 KM450 military vehicle burned	2 killed (Philippine military claim)

On January 22, 2025 the Philippine Army looking to escort a United Nations Development Programme (UNDP) team was attacked by "lawless elements" backed by some gunmen from the Moro Islamic Liberation Front (MILF). The encounter occurred at Sumisip, Basilan, Philippines.

== Attack ==
On January 22, 2025, the Philippine Army were on their way to escort a United Nations Development Programme (UNDP) team when they were attacked by armed men led Najal Buena and Oman Hajal Jali and are allegedly linked to the Moro Islamic Liberation Front (MILF) in Sumisip, Basilan, Philippines. The attack occurred in the Bangsamoro region which is supervised by a transition government led by the MILF.

Two Intel officers died and twelve were injured. The MILF side sustained 2 casualties according to initial reports Around 135 families evacuated during the attack. It is considered the most serious breach of the Comprehensive Agreement on the Bangsamoro of 2014.

The name of the two intel officers killed are Cpl. Jordan Daquipel and Sgt. Reymark Bation of the Army’s 18th Infantry Battalion

== Aftermath ==
The MILF-Ad Hoc Joint Action Group (AHJAG) said that the MILF's 114th Base Command was not informed of the Philippine Army's entry in the area. The Army claim otherwise, insisting that the MILF monitoring committee was informed. Despite this, the army also added that prior coordination was unnecessary since their mission is not a law enforcement operation.
