= June–July 2016 Sulu and Basilan clashes =

Armed conflicts in the Philippines

- Part of Moro conflict
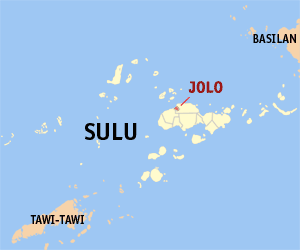
Date	June–July, 2016
Location	Patikul, Sulu; Tipo-Tipo and Ungkaya Pukan, Basilan

Belligerents
Philippines: Armed Forces of the Philippines	Abu Sayyaf

Commanders and leaders
(Philippines) Rodrigo Duterte	Isnilon Hapilon; Furiji Indama

Units involved
Philippine Army: 18th Infantry Battalion; 32nd Infantry Battalion	Abu Sayyaf militants

Strength
5,000 (all involved in clashes)	about 200 in Sulu; about 200 in Basilan

Casualties and losses
2 killed, 45 wounded: 16 wounded in Sulu, June 21; 18 wounded in Sulu, June 22; 1 killed, 6 wounded in Sulu, July 7; 1 killed, 5 wounded in Basilan, July 12	50 killed, 35 wounded: 3 killed, 10 wounded in Sulu, June 21; 7 killed in Sulu, June 22; 22 killed, 16 wounded in Sulu, July 7~July 11; 18 killed, 9 wounded in Basilan, July 6~July 12

The Summer 2016 Sulu and Basilan clashes were armed conflicts that took place in two battlefronts on the southern islands of Mindanao, Philippines from 21 June to 12 July.

== Background ==
After Canadian hostage John Ridsdel had been beheaded by Abu Sayyaf group (ASG) in late April 2016, Canadian hostage Robert Hall was beheaded on June 13, 2016. ASG even demanded $13 million ransom for the release of two other hostages.

Philippine President Duterte warned ASG to stop kidnapping, saying he would eventually confront them.

On 17 June, about five thousand Philippine soldiers had been deployed to the target areas in Sulu to track down ASG.

== Clashes ==
=== Sulu ===
On 21 June, soldiers from the 32nd Infantry Battalion encountered about two hundred ASG members in Patikul town. Three ASG members were killed and at least 10 were wounded. Sixteen Army soldiers were wounded.

On 22 June, another firefight left at least seven ASG members killed and eighteen soldiers wounded.

As the hostage tracking operation continued, on 7 July, troops encountered suspected ASG members. One soldier was killed with six wounded. Nine ASG members were killed and at least nineteen militants were wounded.

By 11 July, 22 ASG were dead.

=== Basilan ===
On 6 July, suspected ASG bandits led by Furuji Indama and Isnilon Hapilon stormed a village in Tipo-Tipo, Basilan. The attack targeted the headquarters of the 18th Infantry Battalion. ASG occupied and fortified Hill 490 of Ungkaya Pukan town as a staging point.

On 12 July, Army rangers prepared to assault Hill 490 after an air and artillery barrage. One ranger was killed and five others were injured after one of them tripped an improvised explosive device. The government casualties were immediately airlifted to Camp Navarro General Hospital.

At least eighteen militants were killed with nine wounded.
