= Albader Parad =

Senior leader of the Abu Sayyaf Islamic militant group

- إَلْبَدِرْ فَرَدْ
- Died: February 21, 2010; Maimbung, Sulu, Philippines
- Cause of death: Gunshot wound
- Known for: Abu Sayyaf senior leader

Albader Parad (died February 21, 2010) was a senior leader of Abu Sayyaf, a group of Islamic militants in the Philippines with links to al-Qaeda. He led the kidnapping of three International Committee of the Red Cross workers in 2009 and was implicated in the 2000 Sipadan kidnappings, where 20 foreign tourists and a Filipino were abducted from the Sipadan Island Diving Resort in Sandakan, Sabah in Malaysia.

Parad was among Abu Sayyaf personalities wanted by the United States government, which had earmarked a ₱1 million reward for his neutralization. The Philippine government had also placed a ₱7 million bounty on his head.

Armed Forces of the Philippines units composed of Philippine Marines clashed with Abu Sayyaf forces in Jolo, killing Parad and five others on February 21, 2010.
