= Zamboanga siege =

2013 armed conflict in the southwest Philippines

- Part of the Moro conflict
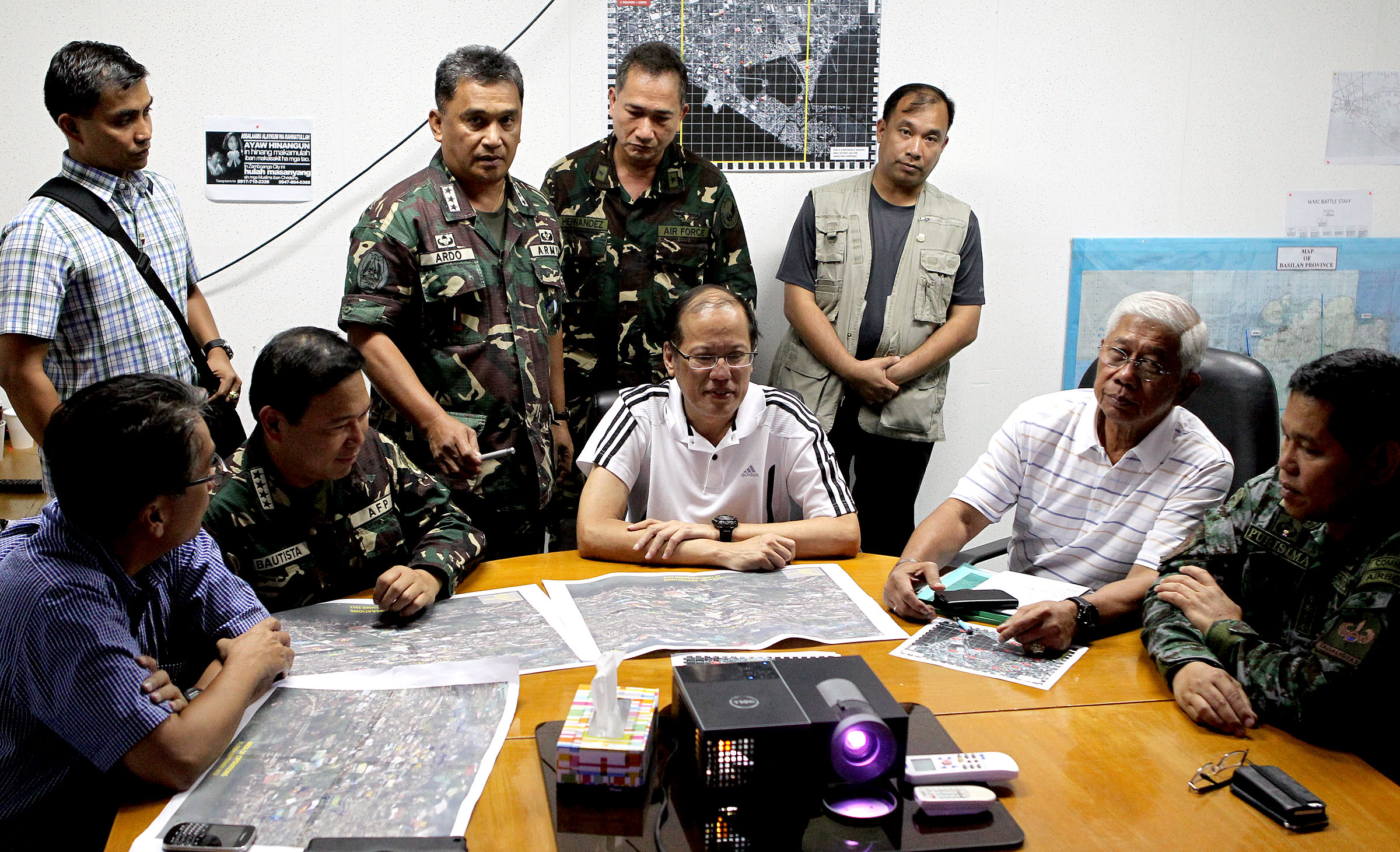
- President Benigno Aquino III meeting with the Armed Forces of the Philippines and Philippine National Police on September 21, 2013
Date	September 9–28, 2013 (2 weeks and 6 days)
Location	Zamboanga City, Philippines 6.9°N 122.066667°E
Result	Philippine government victory

Belligerents
Rogue Moro National Liberation Front elements	Philippines; Supported by: United States

Commanders and leaders
Nur Misuari; Ustadz Habier Malik #; Asamin Hussin; Salip Idjal; Dasta Ismael †; Misba Balaji; Jul Lipae	(Philippines) Benigno Aquino III; (Philippines) Voltaire Gazmin; (Philippines) Emmanuel Bautista; (Philippines) Noel Coballes; (Philippines) Beng Climaco; 1st Lt. Francis G. Damian †; 2nd Lt. Florencio Mikael Meneis †; 1st Lt. Kristopher Rama †

Strength
500 (Government claim)	5,000 (Combined AFP and PNP Forces)

Casualties and losses
Killed: 126-183; Captured: 128-292	Killed: 25; Wounded: 184
- Civilians killed: 13; Civilians wounded: 70; Civilians displaced: 119,714

The Zamboanga siege (Filipino: Pagkubkob sa Zamboanga; Chavacano: Asedio na Zamboanga; Tausug: Pagkubkub ha Sambuwangan) was an armed conflict in Zamboanga City, Philippines, between government forces of the Philippines and a rogue faction of the Moro National Liberation Front (MNLF) that began on September 9, 2013, and ended twenty days later on September 28. The conflict began when rogue MNLF rebels, under the command of Ustadz Habier Malik, attempted to occupy several coastal communities in Zamboanga City in protest of the Philippine government's failure to implement the 1996 Final Peace Agreement with the MNLF.

The conflict resulted in the displacement of 120,000 civilians and the destruction of 10,000 homes. More than 200 people were killed, mostly MNLF rebels, along with 20 soldiers, five policemen, and 13 civilians. The fighting also damaged Zamboanga City's airport and seaport.

== Prelude ==
=== Declaration of the Bangsamoro Republik ===
Nur Misuari, the leader of the rebel group Moro National Liberation Front (MNLF) signed a peace treaty in 1996 that allowed the creation of the Autonomous Region in Muslim Mindanao (ARMM) and Misuari became its first governor. However, in 2001, he was ousted as MNLF chair by his colleagues in the MNLF leadership and replaced as ARMM governor. Misuari's reaction was rebellion against the Philippine government. Recently, however, Misuari "has been angered by a planned peace deal with the Moro Islamic Liberation Front, believing it would sideline the MNLF and the 1996 peace deal".

Misuari proclaimed the independence of the Bangsamoro Republik on August 12, 2013, at Talipao, Sulu, although it was largely ignored by the government. The republic's territory claimed the islands of Basilan, Mindanao, Palawan, Sulu and Tawi-Tawi. Misuari claimed that his declaration of independence was made under the authority of the United Nations General Assembly Resolution 1514. An independent state of Bangsamoro Republik was first declared on April 28, 1974, two months after the siege of Jolo, Sulu after the MNLF first attempted to raise their flag.

=== Preparations for siege ===
The Armed Forces of the Philippines (AFP) received intelligence reports that the MNLF would launch mass operations in Zamboanga City, three days before the incident. AFP spokesman Col. Ramon Zagala said that according to intelligence reports the MNLF troops were deployed to the coastal barangays (villages) of Rio Hondo, Sta. Barbara, Mariqui and Sta. Catalina. According to initial reports, the MNLF group who entered the barangays were unarmed and it was the night before the incident that the MNLF were armed in Rio Hondo. Zagala claimed that the MNLF group involved in the incident is a breakaway faction of the militant group.

In an interview, an MNLF official claimed that the fighters actions was a "pre-emptive response" to a supposed "large" troop movement" of the Army, stating that the group feared that military movement was the prelude to the arrest a high-profile leader of MNLF in the area, such as Nur Misuari.

A commander named Ustadz Habier Malik, who "is a key senior aide of Moro National Liberation Front (MNLF) founder Nur Misuari," was reportedly leading the siege on Zamboanga City. Misuari "disappeared from public view" before the fighting broke out in Zamboanga. Affirming the statements of MNLF Director for Advocacy John Petalcorin that Nur Misuari and the MNLF has no participation in the Zamboanga Siege, the CNN Philippines interviewed Nur Misuari and reported that "Nur Misuari denies charges linking him to the 2013 Zamboanga Siege".

== Timeline ==
=== September 8–15 ===
The initial confrontation occurred around 11:00 p.m. on the evening of Sunday, September 8, 2013. A navy patrol boat intercepted a large motorboat and eight other smaller vessels carrying armed men near the coastal barangay of Rio Hondo. This led to an exchange of fire resulting in several casualties including the death of one of the navy personnel and two civilians.

On September 9, 2013, at around 4:30 a.m., the MNLF entered the city and killed four people, contrary to the first report of having six people killed. Four barangays were occupied by the MNLF: Rio Hondo, Sta. Barbara, Sta. Catalina, and parts of Talon-Talon. The group held 20 civilians hostages in Barangay Sta. Catalina, and around noontime more than 200 civilians were reported as being held hostage by the MNLF. The civilian hostages were being used as human shields by the MNLF.

The city government of Zamboanga declared a "no classes and no work" following the attacks at Barangay Sta. Catalina. A curfew was later imposed throughout the city that day, virtually shutting down the city. Zamboanga City Mayor Isabelle "Beng" Climaco-Salazar later visited the people who fled to different evacuation centers that morning.

Zamboanga International Airport was shut down as all flights operating to and from the city were cancelled.

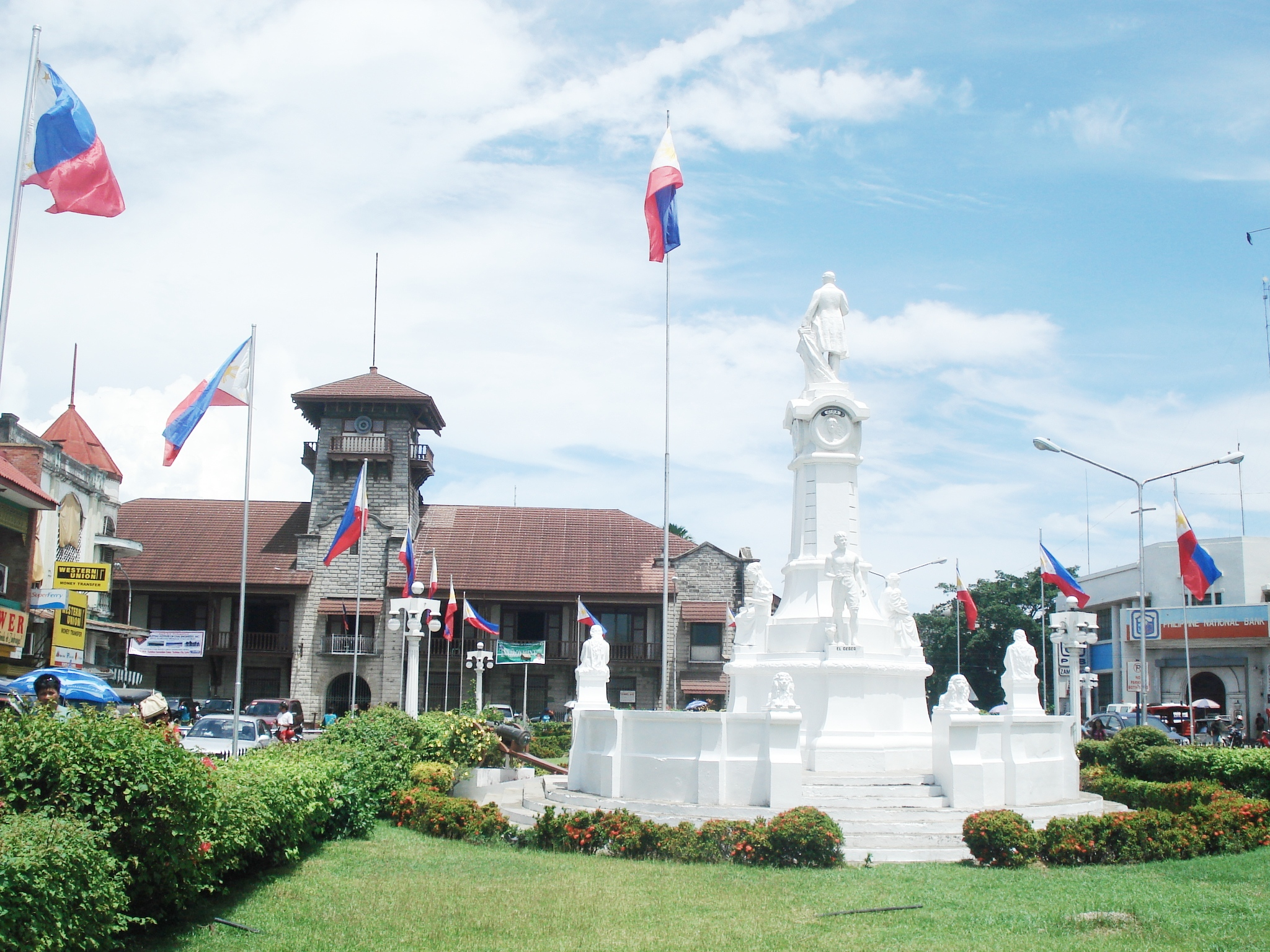
The Zamboanga City Hall where the MNLF intended to hoist the Bangsamoro Republik flag.

On the second day, the Philippine government deployed a larger force in the city. A naval blockade was set, and more troops and units were deployed, including four units of elite troops from the Naval Special Operations Group. At dawn, city police prevented 30 members of the MNLF from joining the main force.

By morning, the MNLF fired rocket-propelled grenades and mortars at military positions. The clash between MNLF and the government forces spread throughout the barangay as residents fled their homes while some people could not leave the area due to fear of being caught in crossfire.

During the afternoon, a fire erupted in Barangay Santa Barbara that razed five houses as firefights between the MNLF and the Armed Forces of the Philippines ensued. Four firetrucks responded, but were delayed, as they needed to have a clearance from the military before entering the area due to the presence of MNLF snipers.

Zamboanga City Mayor Climaco finally contacted Nur Misuari through telephone on Thursday. Mayor Climaco asked Misuari to call off the attack but Misuari claimed that he has no hand at the situation and distanced himself from Commander Habier Malik, and his followers action. This contradicts to what MNLF spokesman, Emmanuel Fontanilla, said earlier. The spokesman said that Misuari was leading the MNLF militants in Zamboanga City.

The Philippine government issued an ultimatum to the MNLF militants in Zamboanga saying that the government will not hesitate to use force to resolve the situation in Zamboanga City. “While the government is exhausting all avenues for a peaceful resolution of the situation, let it be clear to those defying us that they should not entertain the illusion that the state will hesitate to use its forces to protect our people,” Presidential spokesperson Edwin Lacierda said in a statement.

Vice President of the Philippines Jejomar Binay had spoken by telephone to Nur Misuari, and they agreed on a ceasefire. Nur Misauri's spokesperson Rev. Absalom Cerveza said that the current situation in Zamboanga city is a war of independence and denied that the MNLF came to Zamboanga for a peace caravan. "If you win in the war, you will gain your independence. So it happened. MNLF followed this track to gain its independence," he said. The spokesman also denied earlier reports that Misuari disowned Commander Habier Malik.

Plans for a ceasefire fail. MNLF snipers were captured.

=== September 16–28 ===
The Army started to pound MNLF positions in Barangay Sta. Barbara with mortars. A civilian vehicle was accidentally hit by a mortar round as the battle raged, although no one was hurt. Air strikes with 520MG McDonnell Douglas MD 500 Defender attack helicopters and SIAI-Marchetti SF.260 counter-insurgency planes started, firing their guns and rockets against alleged MNLF positions in the city. A total of three rocket rounds from a 520MG of the Air Force struck unspecified enemy stronghold between 1 and 1:30 pm. 33 hostages were released.

Zamboanga City police chief Jose Chiquito Malayo who tried to negotiate with the rebels to release more hostages was reportedly abducted and held hostage by the rebels. Later in the day, he was freed, bringing 23 rebels who had surrendered.

The Army said that government forces killed 120 rebels and now controlled 80 percent of the areas that had been occupied by the rebels. According to the Philippine Department of Social Welfare and Development, due to the fighting, the number of displaced residents has risen to 110,000, As of 18 September 2013, in 35 evacuation centers, such as the Baliwasan Grandstand. The military took control of KGK Building, which was the headquarters of the MNLF-controlled areas. However, the rebel commander had fled before the Army could capture him.

The Zamboanga City international airport reopened. The International Committee of the Red Cross has responded to the humanitarian needs of the residents. Felipe Rojas, Philippine National Police’s directorate for operations Chief Superintendent, said that the gunmen are being “forced to surrender due to hunger.” Governor Mujiv Hataman of the Autonomous Region in Muslim Mindanao said that most of the gunmen, who surrendered, were unknown and were mostly from “Akbar or Albarka towns in Basilan”.

An MNLF commander and 7 fighters surrendered.

The United Nations declared the situation a humanitarian crisis. In 17 days, the fighting had already displaced 109,000 people in Zamboanga City and 19,000 in Basilan, and destroyed more than 10,000 homes.

Government forces gained control over Sumatra Island, which is part of Barangay Talon-Talon and was a strategic landing point used by MNLF fighters. They have also seized 5 water vessels, one motor launch and four jungkungs (motorboat). The motor launch has a capacity of more than 100 people, while each jungkung can carry 30 people. Ammunition, food, MNLF uniforms and vital documents were also recovered from the island.

The Reverend Absalom Cerveza, MNLF spokesman, said that Habier Malik texted him that he will not surrender. Cerveza aked that Malik and his closest followers are the "hardcore" fighters of the MNLF and are willing to put their life on the line. Cerveza described that the situation in Zamboanga "might be the darkest episode in the history of the MNLF,” Malik also asked prayers for the MNLF. According to the spokesman, Nur Misuari asked Malik to stand down, however Cerveza said he was not able to communicate with Malik or any other commanders in the battlefield. It is also reported that some arrested MNLF fighters admitted that they were promised ₱10,000 to join a rally in Zamboanga city. 20 MNLF fighters, including Malik remained in Zamboanga city, according to the military.

President Aquino III discussed the incident to the affected residents of Zamboanga City.

Malacañang said that the nearly three-week crisis in Zamboanga City was now over. Deputy presidential spokesperson Abigail Valte confirmed the statement of National Defense Secretary Voltaire Gazmin that the conflict in Zamboanga was over. "Certainly, the Defense Secretary made that announcement and we've always maintained in the days that we were dealing with the situation that it will be the officials on the ground who will be making the announcement based on their assessment. Our task from Day 1 is to ensure the safety of the hostages that were taken...as well as to get civilians out of harm's way and that has already been accomplished." Defense Secretary Voltaire Gazmin announced: "So far, the security crisis is over and now we go to post-conflict phase."

=== Post-crisis skirmishes ===
As of September 29, 2013, even after the declaration of the end of the crisis, many residents of the City of Zamboanga still hear gunshots from time to time. The Local Government and the Military stated that these are just few skirmishes against remnants of the Rogue MNLF Elements.

== Related attacks ==
=== Lamitan, Basilan ===
Combined forces of the Abu Sayyaf, Bangsamoro Islamic Freedom Fighters and the Moro National Liberation Front reportedly attacked the city of Lamitan in Basilan on September 12, 2013. The same set of militants conducted another attack on September 13, 2013. Philippine security forces were able to repel the attack and managed the situation.

=== Davao City ===
The mall was subjected to one of the two terrorist bombings that occurred on September 17, 2013, with their both abandoning shopping malls attacked at Gaisano Mall of Davao firstly, and lastly would be SM City Davao during their both blast sites. It happened during the time of armed crisis in Zamboanga City, which involved elements of the Moro National Liberation Front (MNLF); however, the MNLF Davao Regional Command denied that they were behind the bombings.

== Human rights violations ==
There were accusation of human rights violations from both sides. The Philippine government claimed that the Moro National Liberation Front were using civilian hostages as human shields. MNLF commanders claimed that they were using the civilians as guides, as they are not familiar of the area. It is reported that MNLF members burned down houses and that firefighters who tried to extinguish the fires were fired at. The MNLF, however claimed that the Philippine security forces were behind in burning the houses in a bid to drive away MNLF members who may be staying in the area.

The American-based Human Rights Watch, in a released media bulletin, claimed that both the MNLF and Government forces committed human rights abuses. The bulletin also stated of an alleged torturing of detained suspected MNLF members by the Philippine National Police and Philippine Armed Forces. According to the rights group, security forces indiscriminately fired at the MNLF militants holding civilian hostages as human shields. It also claimed that the MNLF selectively took Christian civilians as hostages.

== Alleged link to the PDAF scam ==
There are allegations that the Moro National Liberation Front were funded by people involved in the Priority Development Assistance Fund scam to divert the public's attention from the scam. Magdalo party-list representative Gary Alejano claimed that during the previous administration, if there is a big issue plaguing the government, a diversion will be made. Alejano also claimed that people involved in the Priority Development Assistance Fund scam may have funded the rebel group to destabilize the government. Zamboanga Representative Celso Lobregat and Autonomous Region in Muslim Mindanao Governor Mujiv Hataman supported calls for an investigation regarding the matter. Lobregat also called for the Magdalo party-list to disclose everything about the matter. Senator Miriam Defensor-Santiago accused Senator Juan Ponce Enrile, one of the people linked to the scam, in funding the MNLF.

== Reactions ==
=== Local ===
==== Organizations ====
- Philippine Institute for Peace, Violence, and Terrorism Research — Rommel Banlaoi, executive director, said the battle was done to sabotage the peace talks between the Philippine government and the MNLF.
- Catholic Bishops' Conference of the Philippines — On September 11, 2013, Retired Archbishop Oscar Cruz said on the website of the Catholic Bishops' Conference of the Philippines that the crisis has been staged by the government in order to divert public attention away from the Priority Development Assistance Fund scam and towards the crisis. He urged the public to not "fall for it. Stick to this major issue of the abolition of the pork barrel system to safeguard public funds."

==== Political groups ====
- Communist Party of the Philippines — On September 15, the leftist party denounced the Aquino government "for launching an armed siege against the fighters of the Moro National Liberation Front (MNLF)". The party claimed that the Aquino government did not take the condition of the residents of Zamboanga City in consideration. It also claimed that the "Aquino regime has caused the forcible evacuation of civilian residents under threat of armed action'. The party also did not receive Aquino's visit to Zamboanga City to manage the conflict well. The party claimed that Aquino issued "bellicose statements to “inspire” his fascist armed troops". The CPP also claimed that Aquino ignored the situation of the people displaced by the conflict. The CPP also linked the conflict to the PDAF scam. The CPP demanded the Philippine government "to stand down in order to effect a ceasefire and allow the safe withdrawal of the MNLF’s forces from the residential centers". The leftist party also rejected Nur Misuari's "military adventurism and the tendency of the Moro Islamic Liberation Front (MILF) to capitulate to the reactionary Manila government" And lastly, the CPP recognized the Moro people's right to self-determination.

=== International ===
==== Organizations ====
- Organisation of Islamic Cooperation — OIC Secretary General, Ekmeleddin Ihsanoglu was "deeply" disturbed by the continuing reports of violence in Zamboanga City and other parts of Mindanao. He condemned the loss of innocent lives and called for calm and maximum restraint to avoid further bloodshed and to allow peaceful resolution to these incidents. The statement also called for the "resumption of the Tripartite Review Process as soon as possible in order to attend to the remaining unresolved issues that impedes the full implementation of the 1996 Final Peace Agreement (FPA) to pave the way for a just and durable peace in Mindanao." The OIC warned against the termination of the implementation of the final peace process as it will create "a vacuum that is not conducive to building peace or enhancing security." The OIC offered full aid in support to ease the tension and resume the peace process.

==== Governments ====
- European Union — In a statement, The European Union Delegation to the Philippines expressed it concern on the situation in Zamboanga City. "The EU Delegation wishes to express its concern over the recent spate of violence in parts of Zamboanga, initiated by a faction of the Moro National Liberation Front (MNLF)," it said in statement. “We strongly condemn any violation of the international law and human rights of the civilian population in Zamboanga, especially those of women and children. We sympathize with the wounded and hurt, and offer our condolences to the families of the victims of this violence," it added. The delegation also called for both parties to adhere to the peace process in Mindanao, unconditional and immediate end to the crisis and showed concern over the humanitarian crisis caused by the clashes. The delegation also urged both sides "to recognise international rules by allowing safe access of humanitarian organisations and assistance."
- United States - Philip S. Goldberg admitted in June 2 that the United States assisted the Armed Forces of the Philippines during the siege by providing “information and communication assets”, he also said “During that period the JSOTFP provided vital information, communication assets to help Philippine forces”
- Indonesia — In a briefing of foreign diplomats by the Department of Foreign Affairs, Indonesian Ambassador Kristiarto Legowo called for a peaceful resolution to the conflict. "As for Indonesia, we would like to see that we would be able to find a peaceful resolution to this problem as soon as possible so we may avoid more casualties," Legowo said.
- Malaysia — The Malaysian police heightened alert in its borders following the situation in Zamboanga City. "We have informed our security and defense to be on the alert and Esscom is also coordinating with security forces following the incident," Eastern Sabah Security Command (Esscom) director general Datuk Mohammad.

== Peace process ==
On September 20, 2013, at Zamboanga International Airport, President Aquino said that he was still willing to discuss the peace deal with the MNLF.

== Aftermath ==
An estimated 46,000 jobs were lost or disrupted due to the conflict and more than 6,600 homes were destroyed by fire. The total damage is estimated at US$73.2 million, according to the government. As of 2014, Nur Misuari was the UFSBR's Interim President according to the MNLF. A government in exile for the Bangsamoro has also been considered by Misuari.

NLF Commander Habier Malik, who led the siege and was able to escape it, died of diabetes two months after in November 2013. In January 2024, Misuari was cleared of charges of genocide and rebellion related to his alleged involvement in the siege. The court noted in its decision that "as correctly observed by the prosecution during its reinvestigation, no one claims to have seen [Misuari] during the attacks".
