= 2007 Basilan beheading incident =

Armed incident in the Philippines

- Part of Islamic insurgency in the Philippines
Date	July 10, 2007 – July 11, 2007
Location	Tipo-Tipo, Basilan, Philippines 6.484496°N 122.172354°E
Result	MILF-Abu Sayyaf victory: Philippine military fails to rescue Giancarlo Bossi; Philippine military suffers heavy casualties and withdraws from the firefight

Belligerents
Philippines: Armed Forces of the Philippines; Philippine Marine Corps	MILF; Suspected Abu Sayyaf

Commanders and leaders
(Philippines) Brigadier General Ramiro Alivio	Various MILF commanders.

Strength
50 marines	About 400 combatants

Casualties and losses
14–23 killed (11 beheaded); 9-12 wounded 2 M35 military trucks destroyed	20 dead 4 killed (MILF claim)

Map of the Philippines showing the location of Basilan.

The 2007 Basilan beheading incident was an armed incident that took place in July 2007 between the Moro Islamic Liberation Front (MILF) rebels and the Philippine Army. The incident led to the execution of 14 or 23 members of the Philippine Marines; amongst them 11 were beheaded in the province of Basilan, which is located within the southern Philippines.

== Background ==
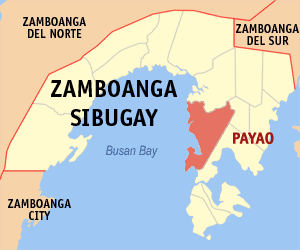
Map of Zamboanga Sibugay showing the location of Payao.

On June 10, 2007, the Italian priest Giancarlo Bossi, of the Pontifical Institute for Foreign Missions (PIME), was kidnapped in Payao, Zamboanga Sibugay province. His captors were believed to be either renegade MILF members or Abu Sayyaf.

His captors released photographs of Bossi that showed him to be alive and well, but they failed to negotiate a solution with the Philippine government. Early operations of the Armed Forces of the Philippines were concentrated on Zamboanga Sibugay, in the belief that the captors had not left the province.

Bossi survived the kidnapping, after being freed on 19th July, 2007.

== Operations in Basilan ==
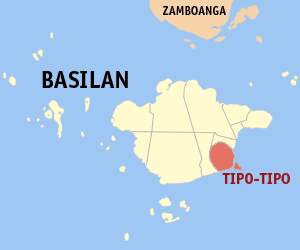
Map of Basilan showing the location of Tipo-Tipo.

On July 10, 2007, according to MILF chief negotiator Mohagher Iqbal, violence broke out at Tipo-Tipo, Basilan, a known Moro region, when Marines entered the town. Lieutenant Col. Ariel Caculitan, spokesman for the Philippine Marines, said the death toll of the Marines was 23 (some document say the location of the encounter was at Al-Barka a new municipality established by Islamic soldiers at Tipo-Tipo).

During the firefight, which lasted a day, at least 20 armed militants were killed, and seven others were wounded. MILF soldiers which later scoured the area after the firefight found 11 headless corpses of Marines. Aside from the beheaded remains, the MILF also recovered 27 firearms. Among the firearms recovered were six M60 machine guns, eight M203 grenade launchers, ten M-16 Armalite rifles, a 60-mm mortar, and several night vision goggles.

Brigadier General Ramiro Alivio, chief of 1st Marine Brigade, said that aside from the MILF, the guerrillas consisted of Abu Sayyaf, and other rebel groups.

However, the Philippine Army said the Abu Sayyaf were not present in the region where Bossi was captured. The official government death toll was 14, although Philippine newspapers says 23 soldiers were dead on the Marines' side.

The Moro Islamic Liberation Front stated "the Marines entered the MILF territory in the town of Tipo-Tipo in complete disregard of the ceasefire agreement between the Moro Islamic Liberation Front, and the Philippine government".

== Reaction ==
Matthew Lussenhop, United States press attaché in Manila, remarked that "It's a tragic incident. The United States embassy condoles with the families of killed, and wounded soldiers although it's still not clear to us what really happened".
