= Noel Coballes =

Filipino Lieutenant General

Noel Abrigo Coballes
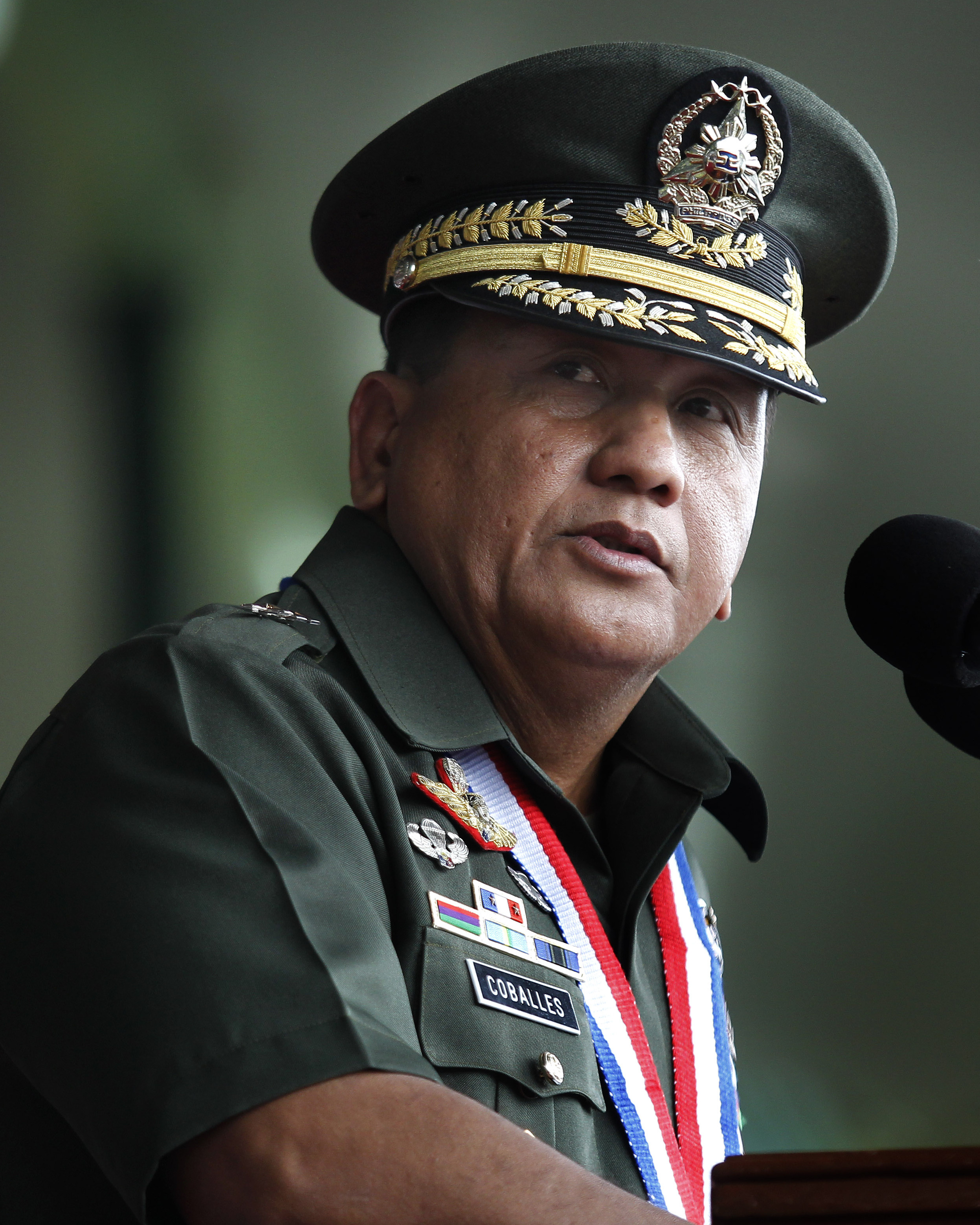
- Born: February 7, 1958 (age 68); Tuguegarao City, Philippines
- Military career
- Allegiance: Philippines
- Branch: Philippine Army
- Service years: 1980–2014
- Rank: Lieutenant General
- Conflicts: Islamic insurgency in the Philippines
- Awards: Distinguished Service Star; Military Merit Medal

Noel Abrigo Coballes (born 7 February 1958) is a retired Filipino Lieutenant General and a two-time Distinguished Conduct Star recipient for combat actions in Maguindanao, and thrice recipient of Distinguished Service Star. He also was awarded five Gold Cross Medals, two Bronze Cross Medals, and more than one Military Merit Medals. He is the former Commanding General of the Philippine Army.

== Biography ==
He graduated from Philippine Military Academy in 1980, 995 he led four different groups of Task Group Panthers in Basilan which liquidated numerous of Abu Sayyaf's terrorists which were accused of kidnaping of civilians. From 1997 to 2000, he was in charge of the 2nd Scout Ranger Battalion in both Maguindanao and Cotabato. From 2001 to 2002 he led Filipino Peacekeeping Unit which was under the United Nations command in East Timor which made it to be an independent state. During the same years he also was in charge of the 1st Infantry Division in Basilan and 10th Infantry Division in Davao. From 1983 to 1984, he participated in both 1st Scout Ranger Regiment and Special Operations Command. From October 19, 2012, to January 22, 2013 he served as a Vice Chief of Staff of the Armed Forces of the Philippines, before assuming his last position as Commanding General of the Philippine Army. He was succeeded by Lieutenant General Hernando Iriberri on February 7, 2014, and retired the same day.

He completed various courses, such as the 1st Scout Ranger Regiment Course in 1980, the Infantry Officer Basic Course in 1987, and the Infantry Officer Advance Course in Fort Benning, Georgia (U.S. state). He also completed the Philippine Army Command and General Staff Course in 2000 and earned his Masters in Strategic Studies in the US Army War College in 2007.

== Awards and decorations ==
- Philippine Republic Presidential Unit Citation
- Martial Law Unit Citation
- People Power I Unit Citation
- People Power II Unit Citation
- Distinguished Conduct Star
- Gold Cross Medals
- Officer, Philippine Legion of Honor
- Gawad sa Kaunlaran
- Bronze Cross Medals
- Military Merit Medals with 4 bronze spearhead devices
- Silver Wing Medal
- Military Commendation Medals
- Military Civic Action Medal
- Sagisag ng Ulirang Kawal
- Long Service Medal
- United Nations Service Medal
- Anti-dissidence Campaign Medal
- Luzon Anti-Dissidence Campaign Medal
- Mindanao Anti-Dissidence Campaign Medal
- Disaster Relief and Rehabilitation Operations Ribbon
- Combat Commander's Badge (Philippines)
- Scout Ranger Qualification Badge
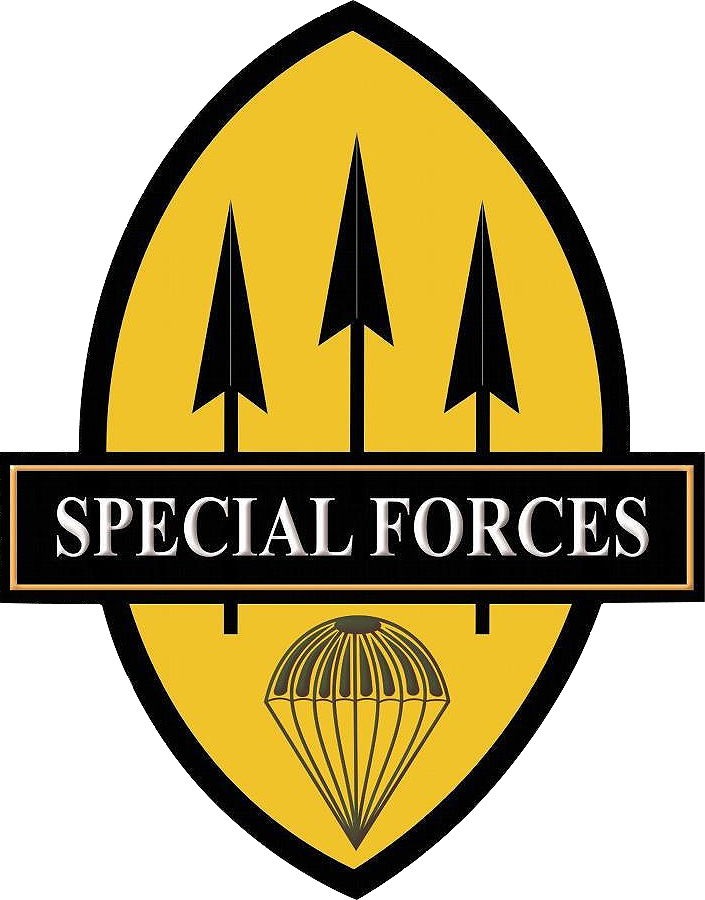
- Special Forces Qualification Badge
- Honorary Airborne Wings from the Royal Thai Army
