= Ameril Umbra Kato =

Moro Islamist terrorist (1946–2015)

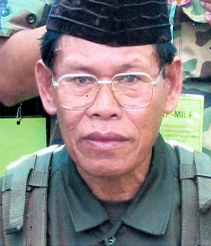
- Born: Amiril Umbra Kato; 18 May 1946; Datu Piang, Cotabato, Philippine Commonwealth
- Died: April 14, 2015 (aged 68); Guindulungan, Maguindanao, Philippines
- Occupations: Founder and leader of the Bangsamoro Islamic Freedom Fighters
- Allegiance: MILF (1985-2011); BIFF
- Criminal charges: Multiple murder Attempted murder (9 counts); Frustrated murder Robbery (26 counts); Arson (10 counts)
- Reward amount: ₱10,000,000.00
- Wanted by: Philippine National Police

Ameril Umbra Kato (18 May 1946 – 14 April 2015) was a Filipino Islamic militant who was the founder of the Bangsamoro Islamic Freedom Fighters (BIFF), a group which seceded from the Moro Islamic Liberation Front (MILF). He joined the MILF in or around 1985, after he graduated from the esteemed Wahhabism School Imam Muhammad bin Saud Islamic University in Riyadh, Saudi Arabia. Umbra Kato was the Philippines' most wanted man, though due to his membership in MILF he was not hunted by the military. A warrant of arrest was filed against him alongside other BIFF members by the Philippine National Police. The Armed Forces of the Philippines, with the MILF, launched Operation Darkhorse in a bid to arrest him in January 2014.

Kato died on 14 April 2015, aged 68. BIFF spokesperson Abu Misry Mama confirmed his death after he was informed by Kato's son that he died at 2:00 am due to complications from pneumonia, possibly after suffering a heart attack or stroke. He was reported to have died in Barangay Kateman in Guindulungan, Maguindanao del Sur, but this was denied by the chairman of that barangay.
