= Bangsamoro Islamic Freedom Fighters =

Islamist militant group based in the Philippines

- Flag of the Bangsamoro Islamic Freedom Fighters
- Leaders: Ameril Umbra Kato #; Ismael Abubakar (alias "Imam Bongos") †; Mohiden Animbang (alias "Kagui Karialan") †; Esmael Abdulmalik (alias "Abu Toraife") # (surrendered)
- Dates active: 2008–present
- Split from: Moro Islamic Liberation Front
- Active regions: Mainly in Maguindanao del Sur province
- Ideology: Salafi jihadist Islamism; Factions: Moro nationalism Islamic Statism
- Status: Active
- Size: c. 500 (July 2016) c. 264 (2018) c. 80 (2022)

The Bangsamoro Islamic Freedom Fighters (BIFF), also known as the Bangsamoro Islamic Freedom Movement, is an Islamist jihadist militant organization based in Mindanao, in the southern Philippines. It is mostly active in Maguindanao del Sur and other places in central Mindanao. It is a breakaway group from the Moro Islamic Liberation Front (MILF) founded by Ameril Umbra Kato. Following Kato's death, the group split into three factions, one of which has aligned with the Islamic State, while the other two are less radical.

== History ==
=== Foundation and operations under Ameril Umbra Kato ===
Kato broke with the Moro Islamic Liberation Front (MILF) in 2008 because he disagreed with the MILF's acceptance of autonomy rather than full independence. In 2008, after the Philippine Supreme Court nullified the Memorandum of Agreement on Ancestral Domain signed by the Philippine government and the MILF, Kato led a contingent of MILF fighters in an attack against civilians. In December 2010, Kato formed the BIFF. He claimed to have 5,000 fighters but the government said that he had only 300. It was not until August 2011 that the MILF recognized the break and declared the BIFF a "lost command".

The BIFF rejected the 2012 Framework Agreement on the Bangsamoro, a preliminary peace agreement signed between the Government of the Philippines and the MILF, and vowed to continue their fight. In January 2014, after the final annexes of the Framework Agreement were signed, the Armed Forces of the Philippines launched Operation Darkhorse against the BIFF. The army captured the BIFF's main camp in Barangay Ganta, Shariff Saydona Mustapha, Maguindanao del Sur which reportedly had 500 fighters.

On February 4, 2014, the Moro National Liberation Front (MNLF) commander Habib Mujahab Hashim confirmed reports that the BIFF had forged an alliance with his group.

Along with the MILF, on January 25, 2015, the BIFF was involved in the 2015 Mamasapano clash, leading to the deaths of 44 members of the SAF, 18 from the MILF and five from the BIFF. Following the event, the group engaged in some clashes against the AFP, prompting AFP Chief of Staff Gregorio Catapang to announce in late February 2015 an all-out offensive against the BIFF. The offensive resulted in more than 100 casualties in the BIFF. It also suffered a split when a commander Tambako formed the Justice for Islamic Movement to protect the foreign militants hiding in BIFF controlled areas. He was captured in General Santos trying to escape the law.

In 2019, Malaysia listed the group as terrorist.

=== Split after Ameril Umbra Kato's death ===
After founder Ameril Umbra Kato's death, BIFF's former vice-chairman for political affairs, Ismael Abubakar, alias "Imam Bongos", took over leadership of the group. Among the first moves of the BIFF under Abubakar was the bombing of an outpost of the Philippine Army and two different detachments of the Special Action Force (SAF) in Maguindanao on April 19, 2015. Over time, Ismael Abubakar began to increasingly adopt the radical ideology of the Islamic State, and openly declared an alliance with IS in August 2015.

This development caused unrest among the group. As result, one commander of BIFF, Ustadz Karialan (alias "Imam Minimbang"), split from the group with his followers and formed a separate faction. This faction stated that "we are not to be swayed by the ISIS ideology because we adhere to the cause of the Moro struggle and teachings of the Koran". Despite this, disagreements over ideological trends continued in Ismael Abubakar's faction, with part of his followers regarding his stance as too moderate. These hardliners eventually left as well, forming the "Jamaatul al-Muhajireen wal-Ansar" wing of the group and electing Esmael Abdulmalik (alias "Abu Toraife") as leader. This most radical faction of BIFF has openly adopted the Islamic State's ideology. Even though the three BIFF factions would no longer coordinate their operations, they remained part of a "loose strategic alliance". Ismael Abubakar was reportedly killed at some point in 2017.

=== Battle of Marawi and aftermath ===
It is possible that BIFF participated in the Battle of Marawi of 2017. The Philippine military stated in May 2017 that BIFF fighters were among the Jihadists in the city, while Secretary of National Defense Delfin Lorenzana claimed in June 2017 that about 40 fighters of the group took part in the fighting. According to other reports, the group had not only contributed fighters to the battle, but also provided "logistical support" to the IS forces besieged in Marawi. Nevertheless, a BIFF spokesman stated in June 2017 that though his group "welcomed" the offensive by the Maute group and Abu Sayyaf, BIFF's operations at the time were unrelated to the Battle of Marawi. Furthermore, the leader of the Moro Islamic Liberation Front Murad Ebrahim claimed in July 2018 that BIFF had not participated in the battle. After the rebels in Marawi had been defeated, many foreign volunteers and ex-members of the Maute group joined BIFF. This temporarily boosted the rebel group's strength and allowed it to expand its operations, resulting in an increase of BIFF attacks and bombings.

On 3 July 2019, three soldiers were injured and four militants after a gunfight in Datu Paglas, Maguindanao del Sur. Later on 29 July, nine BIFF members were killed after a gunfight which took place in Shariff Saydona Mustapha. The militants killed were all followers of Abu Toraife, whose real name is Abdulmalik Esmael, General of one of three factions in the BIFF. Days after the authorities found militants training suicide bombers in Southern Philippines.

By 2020, BIFF activities began to decline once again, as the group's factions came under pressure by security forces and could no longer replace their losses. In May 2021, several BIFF fighters of the Karialan faction were killed in clashes with Philippine security forces. Between 50 and 200 BIFF militants occupied the market in Datu Paglas on 8 May 2021. The insurgents were led by Solaiman Tudon who was part of Ustadz Karialan's faction. The rebels were quickly expelled from Datu Paglas, and observers speculated that the Karialan faction had just wanted to demonstrate its continued combat capabilities through this operation. By 2022/23, BIFF had declined to just about 80–100 members, greatly hampering its operations. Furthermore, Abu Toraife was reportedly heavily wounded in one skirmish with security forces. Despite this, Abu Toraife was "floated by the Philippine military as a possible new leader" for a revived Abu Sayyaf, though researcher Jacob Zenn argued that the BIFF splinter leader had "yet to make any significant impact on the movement".

On 22 April 2024, a shootout erupted between Filipino soldiers and BIFF militants in Datu Saudi Ampatuan, Maguindanao del Sur. Kagui Karialan, leader of Karialan faction of the BIFF, his brother Saga, and ten other gunmen were killed. A dozen of high-powered firearms were recovered. In March, Abu Halil, the training officer of BIFF-Karialan Faction was also killed.

== Engagements ==
- Operation Darkhorse (2014)
- Mamasapano clash (2015)
- Marawi crisis (2017)

== See also ==
- Insurgency in the Philippines
- Peace process with the Bangsamoro in the Philippines
