= Moro conflict =

Separatist conflict in the Philippines

- Part of the Cold War, Civil conflict in the Philippines, war on terror, North Borneo dispute and War against the Islamic State
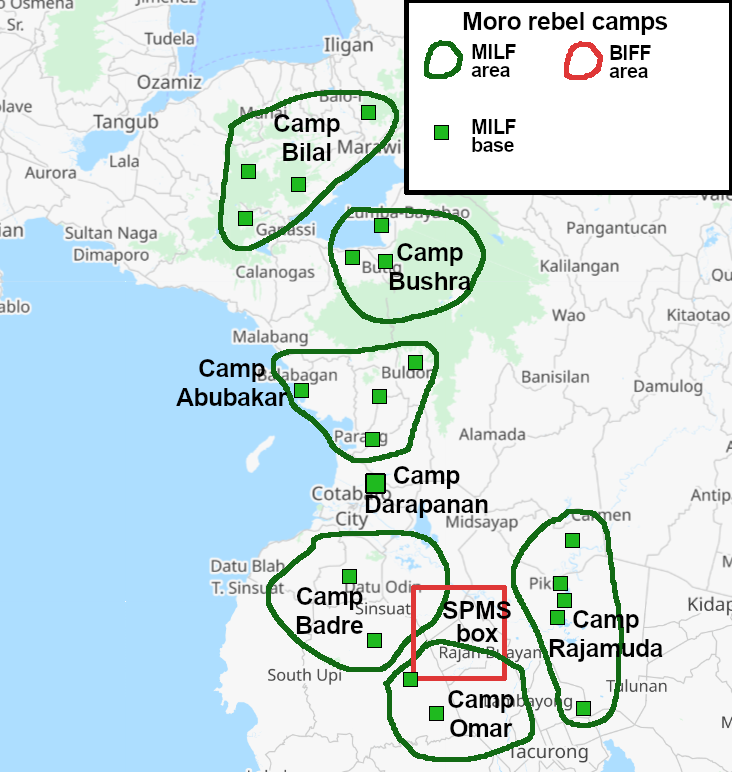
- Map of Moro insurgent camps in Mindanao at the time of the 2014 ceasefire
Date	18 March 1968 – 22 February 2019 (50 years, 11 months and 4 days)
Location	Mindanao, Philippines
Result	Peace agreements declared between the Government and the MNLF/MILF; Cessation of hostilities with the MNLF and MILF; Operation Enduring Freedom ended on 23 October 2017 dealing a heavy blow to jihadist forces, reducing their numbers significantly and recapturing all their territory; Bangsamoro Transition Authority established to govern the Bangsamoro Autonomous Region in Muslim Mindanao from 2019–2026; Ongoing ISIL insurgency and sporadic clashes between MNLF/MILF remnant militias and against the government
Territorial changes	The Bangsamoro Autonomous Region in Muslim Mindanao (BARMM) was officially ratified on 22 February 2019, and replaced the Autonomous Region in Muslim Mindanao (ARMM)

Belligerents
Philippines; ARMM (1989-2019); Bangsamoro (from 2019): MNLF (since 1996); MNLF EC-15; MILF (since 2014); BIAF; Pro-government paramilitaries: Ilaga (1967-1979); New Ilaga (since 2008); Red God's Defenders (since 2016); Tadtad (1972-1984); Christian God Spirit (2000); Alsa Masa (1984-1987); Foreign support: United States(against jihadist groups only)	Bangsamoro (until 2019): MNLF (1972–1996); MILF (1977–2014); BIAF; BIFF (2008-2015); Non-DI factions (2015-2026); Karialan Faction; Bungos Faction (from 2018); MNLF and MILF hardliners or radicals; Foreign support: Libya (1970s); Malaysia (1968–2001); NDFP: MRLO (from 2005)	Jihadist groups 1991-2014: Abu Sayyaf; Jemaah Islamiyah (1993-2010s); Rajah Sulaiman Movement (until 2005); Khalifa Islamiyah Mindanao (2011-2013); Maute Group (from 2013); From 2014: Dawlah Islamiyah; Maute Group; Sulu; Toraife Group (from 2015); Abu Sayyaf (Hapilon Faction) (until 2017); Bungos Faction (until 2018); Hassan Group; Ansar Khalifa Philippines (until 2024); Basilan (until 2024); Abu Sayyaf

Commanders and leaders
Ferdinand Marcos # (1968–1986); Brig. Gen. Teodulfo Bautista X; Corazon Aquino # (1986–1992); Fidel Ramos # (1992–1998); Joseph Estrada (1998–2001); Gloria Macapagal Arroyo (2001–2010); Benigno Aquino # (2010–2016); Rodrigo Duterte (2016–2019)	Nur Misuari (1972–1996); Habier Malik #; Muslimin Sema (1972–1996); Habib Mujahab Hashim # (1972–1996); Abul Khayr Alonto # (1972–1996); Murad Ebrahim (1977–2014); Hashim Salamat # (1977–2003)	Radullan Sahiron; Abdurajak Janjalani †; Khadaffy Janjalani †; Isnilon Hapilon †; Galib Andang †; Ameril Umbra Kato #; Abu Toraife #; Kagui Karialan †; Omar Maute †; Abdullah Maute †; Abu Dar †; Mohammad Maguid †; Ahmed Santos (POW)

Strength
250,000 (1975) 125,000–130,000 (2012); Unspecified; 650 trainers (2002) 75,000 Ilaga members (1987)	30,000 (1973–1975) 50,000 - 60,000 (1974; Philippine army claim / estimate); 10,000 - 30,000 (1990s); 11,000 (2012)	50 (2025; claim by the AFP)

Casualties and losses
~30,000 soldiers killed (Philippine Army claim; 1970–1996) Tens of thousands wounded (1970-1996) 100,000+ soldiers killed (According to Ferdinand Marcos; 1972–1986) 11,000 soldiers killed (according to Ferdinand Marcos; 1972-80 Controversy exists) 1,100+ casualties (1986–2004; or far higher) approx. 240 soldiers killed (2014–present; against Jihadist groups only) Ilaga: 1,238 casualties (1969–1972) 17 killed (14 accidental or 3 death bombing attack 2002-2015)	50,000–60,000 killed (1970–1996; Philippine Army claim)^ likely exaggerated Unknown casualties (Overall estimates unavailable; according to Marjanie Salic Macasalong) 207 killed (1986–2004; Philippine Human Development Report 2005) 1,178 killed (1986–2004; Philippine Human Development Report 2005)	1,680+ killed (2014–present; against the Philippine government only)
- 10,000 Moro civilians killed by the Philippine army, Ilaga and Constabulary (Indpendent source; 1972-1986) Thousands up to 300,000 Moro Muslims dead (Bangsamoro rebel claim; 1972–1986) 1,991-2,497 killed in Islamist terrorist attacks (1979-2024) 20,000 civilian deaths (1970–1996; Philippine army claim) Total killed: c. Hundreds of thousands (1968–2015); Total displaced: 2,000,000+ displaced (1970–2011) or 3,500,000+ displaced (2000–2014)
- Timeline of the conflict: Timeline

The Moro conflict was an insurgency in the Mindanao region in southern Philippines which involved multiple armed groups. A decades-long peace process has resulted in peace deals between the Philippine government and two major armed groups, the Moro National Liberation Front (MNLF) and the Moro Islamic Liberation Front (MILF), but other smaller armed groups continue to exist. In 2017, the peace council settled around 138 clan conflicts.

The root cause of the Moro conflict is associated in a long history of resistance by the Moro people against foreign rule, for centuries the region was under the control of the Spanish Empire. The U.S. had a brief war with Spain in 1898 which ended in the transfer of the Philippines to the United States, and this led to American occupation until 1946.

During the administration of President Ferdinand Marcos, political tensions and open hostilities developed between the government and Moro rebel groups. The Moro insurgency was triggered by the Jabidah massacre on March 18, 1968, during which 60 Filipino Muslim commandos on a planned operation to reclaim the eastern part of the Malaysian state of Sabah were killed. To conserve the secrecy of the operation, the Malaysian government supported and funded the rebels which devastated the southern Philippines, until support ceased in 2001.

Various organizations pushing for Moro self-determination, either through autonomy or independence, were almost immediately formed in response. Although these generally did not last long until University of the Philippines professor Nur Misuari established the Moro National Liberation Front, an armed insurgent group committed to establishing an independent Mindanao, in 1972. In the following years, the MNLF splintered into several different groups including the Moro Islamic Liberation Front founded by Hashim Salamat in 1977, which sought to establish an Islamic state within the Philippines. In 1991, Abdurajak Abubakar Janjalani gathered radical members of the old MNLF who wanted to resume armed struggle and established the Abu Sayyaf (ASG). When the MILF modified its demands from independence to autonomy, a faction led by Ameril Umbra Kato disagreed, eventually forming the Bangsamoro Islamic Freedom Fighters (BIFF) in 2008.

Casualty statistics vary for the conflict, though the conservative estimates of the Uppsala Conflict Data Program indicate that at least 6,015 people were killed in armed conflict between the government and ASG, BIFF, MILF, MNLF between 1989 and 2012.

== Historical antecedents (16th century - 1946) ==
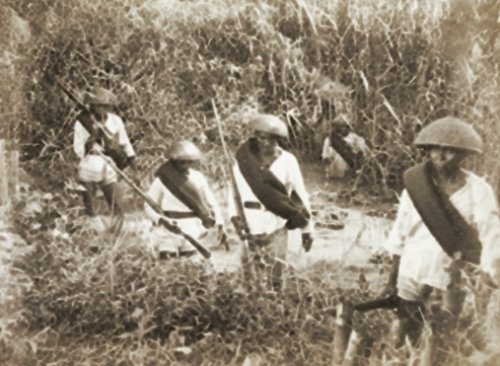
Christian Filipinos, who served under the Spanish Army, searching for Moro rebels during the Spanish–Moro conflict, c. 1887. The insurgency in Mindanao can be traced to the 1500s, when the Spanish arrived in the Moro heartland.

The Moro people have had a history of resistance against foreign rule for more than 400 years. During the Spanish–Moro conflict, Spain repeatedly tried to conquer the Moro Sultanate of Sulu, Sultanate of Maguindanao, and the Confederation of sultanates in Lanao like what it did with the former Muslim Rajahnate of Maynila (As the Rajah of Manila, Rajah Matanda was a grandson of the Sultan of Brunei, "Sultan Bolkiah" and a Princess of Sulu "Dayang-dayang Laila Machanai"). Although Spain succeeded in supplanting Islam in Manila and Mindoro, they failed against the Muslims in the South. The armed struggle against the Spanish, Americans, Japanese, and Christian Filipinos is considered by current Moro Muslim leaders to be part of a four-century-long "national liberation movement" of the Bangsamoro (Moro Nation).

The foundations of the modern conflict can be traced to the Spanish and American wars against the Moros. Following the Spanish–American War in 1898, another conflict sparked in the southern Philippines between the revolutionary Muslims in the Philippines and the United States military that took place between 1899 and 1913. On August 14, 1898, after defeating Spanish forces, the United States claimed the Philippines as its territory under the Treaty of Paris of 1898, establishing a military government under General Wesley Merritt as Military Governor. Filipinos immediately opposed foreign rule by the United States.

American forces took control from the Spanish government in Jolo on May 18, 1899, and at Zamboanga in December 1899. Brigadier General John C. Bates was sent to negotiate a treaty with the Sultan of Sulu, Jamalul Kiram II. Kiram was disappointed by the American takeover, as he expected to regain sovereignty after the defeat of Spanish forces in the archipelago. Bates' main goal was to guarantee Moro neutrality in the Philippine–American War, and to establish order in the southern Philippines. After some negotiation, the Bates Treaty was signed, which was based on an earlier Spanish treaty. The Bates Treaty did ensure the neutrality of the Muslims in the south, but it was actually set up to buy time for the Americans until the war in the north ended. On March 20, 1900, Bates was replaced by Brigadier General William August Kobbé and the District of Mindanao-Jolo was upgraded to a full department. American forces in Mindanao were reinforced and hostilities with the Moro people lessened, although there are accounts of Americans and other civilians being attacked and slain by Moros.

The American invasion began in 1904 and ended at the term of Major General John J. Pershing, the third and final military governor of Moro Province, although major resistance continued in Mount Bagsak and Bud Dajo in Jolo; in the latter, the United States military killed hundreds of Moro in the Moro Crater massacre. After the war, in 1915, the Americans imposed the Carpenter Treaty on Sulu.

Repeated rebellions by the Moros against American rule continued to break out even after the main Moro Rebellion ended, right up to the Japanese occupation of the Philippines during World War II. During the Japanese invasion, the Moros waged an insurgency against the Japanese on Mindanao and Sulu until Japan surrendered in 1945. Moro Juramentados attacked the Spanish, Americans, Philippine Constabulary, and the Japanese.

== Philippine administrations after World War II (1946–1968) ==
The American colonial government and subsequently the Philippine government pursued a policy of intra-ethnic migration by resettling significant numbers of Christian Filipino settlers from the Visayas and Luzon onto tracts of land in Mindanao, beginning in the 1920s. This policy allowed Christian Filipinos to outnumber both the Moro and Lumad populations by the 1970s, which was a contributing factor in aggravating grievances between the Moro and Filipino Christian settlers as disputes over land increased. Another grievance by the Moro people is the extraction of Mindanao's natural resources by the central government whilst many Moros continued to live in poverty.

Moro Muslims and Lumads were largely supplanted during the Spanish and American colonization programs, with Christian Filipino settlers eventually taking control of key areas along newly built roads and disrupting traditional Moro administrative structures and control over resources. The Americans preferred Christians to become administrators of newly defined townships instead of Lumad and Moro, with environmental degradation resulting from unsustainable population growth (due to the influx of settler migrants) and timber logging.

== Ferdinand Marcos administration (1965–1986) ==
=== Jabidah massacre ===
The active phase of the Moro conflict is attributed to news about the Jabidah massacre in March 1968 – towards the end of the first term of President Ferdinand Marcos. A senate exposé based on the testimony of an alleged survivor claimed that at least 11 Filipino Muslim military trainees had been killed in Corregidor by soldiers of the Armed Forces of the Philippines. The trainees had been brought to the island of Corregidor to form a secret commando unit called "Jabidah," which would infiltrate, destabilize, and take over Sabah for the Sulu Sultan who previously owned it. The trainees eventually rejected their mission, for reasons that are still debated by historians today. A survivor, Jibin Arula, said that whatever the reasons behind their objections, all of the recruits aside from him were killed, and he escaped only by pretending to be dead.

The news created unrest among Filipino Muslims, especially among students. Both Muslim intellectuals and common people suddenly became politicized, discrediting the idea of finding integration and accommodation with the rest of the country, and creating a sense of marginalization.

=== Early separatist movements ===
Various organizations pushing for Moro self rule, either through autonomy or independence, were soon formed. Lanao del Sur congressman Haroun al-Rashid Lucman called for Congress to begin proceedings to impeach President Marcos, and ended up establishing the Bangsamoro Liberation Organization (BMLO) in frustration after the impeachment effort couldn't gather enough congressional support. Cotabato Governor Datu Udtog Matalam established the Muslim Independence Movement (MIM), which openly called for the secession of the region to create a Muslim state, although it only lasted until Matalam negotiated with Marcos and accepted a post in the administration cabinet.

=== Religious violence in Mindanao (1970-1972) ===
Between 1970 and 1972, Muslim and Christians attacked and massacred each other. These violent sectarian attacks were mostly carried out by the Ilaga, members of the Cotabato Blackshirts and Moro "Barracudas".

The Ilaga launched a series of 21 massacres, killing 518 and injuring 184. Most of whom were targeted against Moro Muslims. Ilaga atrocities also included the Manili massacre in 1971. Which resulted in the deaths of 70 Moro Muslims inside a mosque and nearby a school in North Cotabato.

Moro Muslim gangs and armed wings of Moro political dynasties retaliated against Christian farmers, Thomas McKenna estimated that over 269 Christians were killed in Cotabato 1971, followed by the deaths of over 305 Muslim Moros.

In Lanao del Norte 1971, Hundreds of Ilaga members were reportedly killed by Moro Muslim "Barracuda" militants in an armed incident between the Ilaga, Muslim militants had lost hundreds as well.

As a result of the violence. An estimated 1,400-4,000 were killed and thousands were wounded, Including over 500 Muslims.

Datu Udtog Matalam, the founder of the Muslim Independence Movement (MIM), refused to describe massacres and atrocities responsible by Moro muslims.

Moro Muslim atrocities against Christian civilians were also reported, with one account mentioning the Zamboanga del Sur killings of 58 to 67 Christians in 1971, in retaliation for Ilaga atrocities on Moro muslim civilians.

Lisa Navarrette had stated that Thousands of Christians were murdered and displaced.

=== The Moro National Liberation Front (1972) ===
On October 21, 1972, University of the Philippines professor Nur Misuari formed the Moro National Liberation Front (MNLF) which sought the establishment of a Moro republic through the force of arms, attracting many members who broke away from the MIM.

According to the official line of the MNLF, it was founded on an ideology of egalitarianism, and is thus intended as a secular movement, unlike the Moro Islamic Liberation Front which would later splinter from its ranks in 1978.

From its beginnings in October 1972, the MNLF has had alternating periods of conflict and relative peace with Philippine government forces, until a 1996 Final Peace Agreement during the administration of President Fidel V. Ramos - although at least one major encounter - the Zamboanga City crisis of September 9 to 28, 2013 - took place after this agreement.

==== The Siege of Jolo ====
During one of the fiercest battles of the insurgency in 1974, Jolo was extensively damaged and news of the tragedy galvanized other Muslims around the world to pay greater attention to the conflict. Many civilians were supposedly killed when the Armed Forces razed much of Jolo municipality to the ground in a scorched-earth tactic.

==== The Malisbong massacre ====
On September 24, 1974, the Philippine Army killed at least 1,000 Moro civilians who were praying in a mosque in what is known as the Malisbong massacre.

==== The Tripoli Agreement ====
Two years later, the Philippine government and the MNLF signed the Tripoli Agreement, declaring a ceasefire on both sides. The agreement provided that Mindanao would remain a part of the Philippines, but that 13 of its provinces would be governed by an autonomous government for the Bangsamoro people. President Marcos later reneged on the agreement, and violence ensued.

The Communist Party of the Philippines maintained a liaison officer in Tripoli with the MNLF.

=== The Moro Islamic Liberation Front (1977) ===
In 1977, Sheikh Salamat Hashim established the Moro Islamic Liberation Front (MILF), a splinter group of the MNLF seeking to establish an Islamic state. Conflicts between these rebel groups and the Armed Forces of the Philippines continued until the end of President Marcos' regime. From 1972 to 1980, at least 50,000 people were killed in the conflict, one million people were internally displaced, and more than 100,000 Philippine Muslims fled by boat to Malaysia.

=== Silsilah Dialogue Movement (1984) ===
In 1984, Italian Catholic priest Fr Sebastiano D’Ambra began a movement called the Silsilah Dialogue Movement focused on formation of people from different religions to encourage understanding and inter-religious dialogue in Mindanao. Over time, Fr D’Ambra realised that besides strengthening interreligious ties, the Catholic community also needed a better grounding in the faith, founding the Emmaus Dialogue Movement to address this challenge.

== Corazon Aquino and Ramos administrations (1986–1998) ==
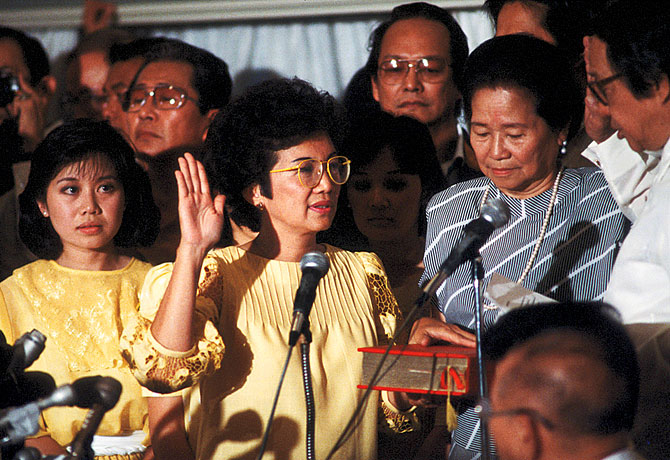
Corazon Aquino was inaugurated as the 11th president of the Philippines on February 25, 1986, at Sampaguita Hall (Now Kalayaan Hall).

=== Negotiations after the People Power Revolution ===
Soon after becoming President of the Philippines as a result of the civilian-led People Power Revolution, Corazon Aquino arranged a meeting with the MNLF chairman Nur Misuari and several MNLF rebel groups in Sulu, which paved the way for a series of negotiations.

=== Creation of the ARMM ===
In 1989, the Autonomous Region in Muslim Mindanao (ARMM) was created under Republic Act No. 6734 or the ARMM Organic Act, pursuant to the 1987 Constitution.

Under the Presidency of Fidel V. Ramos, several negotiations and peace talks were held and the ARMM solidified and was to have its own geopolitical system.

On 9–11 December 1997 the MNLF brought the pagan indigenous Lumad leader Mai Tuan to Tehran to attend the eight OIC Islamic Summit Conference.

=== Formation of the Abu Sayyaf Group ===
In 1991, Abdurajak Janjalani, a former teacher who had studied Islam in the Middle East, formed the Abu Sayyaf Group after reportedly meeting Osama bin Laden in Afghanistan in the 1980s. Janjalani recruited former members of the MNLF for the more radical and theocratic Abu Sayyaf.

== Estrada administration (1998–2001) ==
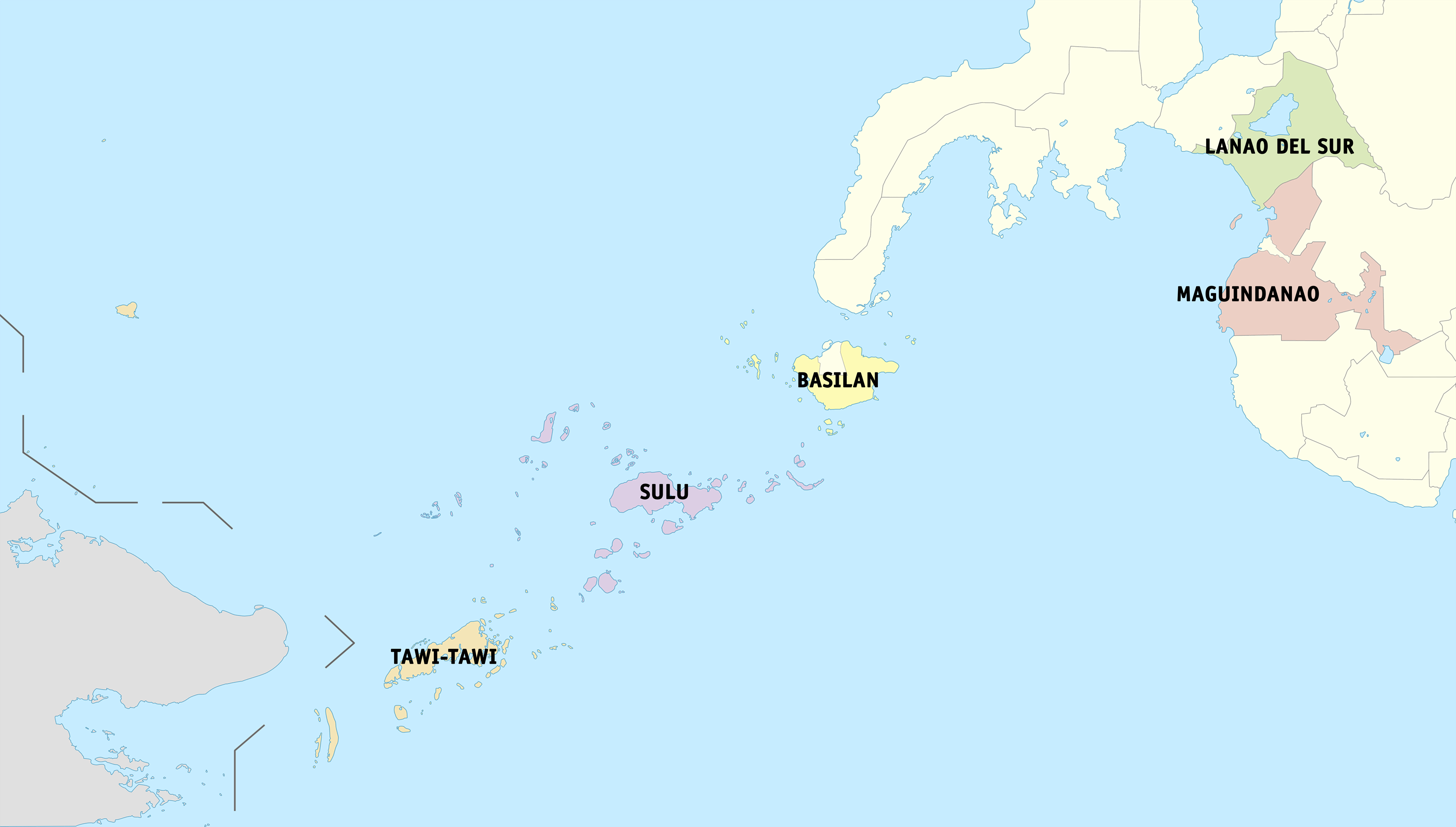
Political map of the Autonomous Region in Muslim Mindanao (ARMM)

=== Estrada's "All Out War" policy ===
During his term, President Joseph Ejercito Estrada declared an "all-out war" against the MILF on March 21, 2000, although a series of negotiations for cessation of hostilities were held. Apparently, several conflicts in and around Mindanao erupted and clashes between the Philippine military and the rebel groups resulted in substantial loss of life.

During Estrada's term, the rebel groups kidnapped three Italian priests, two of whom were later released and one shot dead; seized the municipal halls of Talayan, Maguindanao, and Kauswagan, Lanao del Norte; bombed the RORO ferry M/V Our Lady of Mediatrix at Ozamiz; and took over Narciso Ramos Highway. All these incidents resulted in massive loss of investments abroad, especially in the area of Mindanao.

As a result, the Armed Forces of the Philippines launched a successful campaign against the rebel groups; 43 minor camps, 13 major camps including the MILF headquarters, and Camp Abubakar fell. The MILF suffered heavy losses and the head of the MILF, Sheikh Salamat Hashim, fled the country and sought refuge in Malaysia. On October 5, 2000, 609 rebels surrendered in Cagayan de Oro, along with renegade town mayor Mulapandi Cosain Sarip. This was followed by another surrender of 855 rebels on December 29, 2000. President Estrada then ordered that the Philippine flag be raised in Mindanao, which symbolized victory. It was raised on July 9, 2000, near a Madh'hab and again the next day for President Estrada, who held a feast inside a classroom just meters away from a mosque.

=== Retaliatory attacks ===
As a result, several Islamic rebel groups retaliated, bombing several key locations within the National Capital Region on December 30, 2000, resulting in 22 deaths and hundreds of people injured. Saifullah Yunos, one of the perpetrators, was arrested in Cagayan de Oro as he was about to board a plane bound for Manila in May 2003. In 2004, two members of the Jemaah Islamiyah were arrested, namely Mamasao Naga and Abdul Pata, as they were identified by Fathur Rahman al-Ghozi as responsible for the train bombing. Al-Ghozi was also arrested, but was later killed in a firefight when he tried to escape from prison on October 13, 2003.

== Arroyo administration (2001–2010) ==
On May 27, 2001, the Abu Sayyaf seized twenty hostages from an upscale resort in Palawan. Four of the hostages managed to escape. The kidnapping group composed of 40 gunmen then seized the Dr. Jose Torres Memorial Hospital and St. Peter's Church compound in the town of Lamitan in Basilan and claimed to have taken captive 200 people, although 20 people were confirmed to be taken captive inside the hospital, including the staff and the patients.

There was a crossfire between the Philippine Army and Abu Sayyaf rebels in Lamitan following the hospital takeover which resulted in the deaths of 12 soldiers, including the army captain. Up to 22 soldiers were reportedly killed in an effort to rescue the hostages.

Five more captives escaped during the battle at Lamitan. Two of the captives were killed prior to the siege in Lamitan, including one beheading. The Abu Sayyaf then conducted a series of raids, including one at a coconut plantation where the rebel groups hacked the heads of two men using bolo knives. The owners and a security guard were also held captive and the rebel groups burned down two buildings, including a chapel, a week after the battle in Lamitan. Another raid was conducted on August 2, 2001, on Barangay Balobo in Lamitan, Basilan. After three days, the Philippine Army rescued numerous hostages after they overtook the hideout of the militants, where 11 bodies were found beheaded. Other hostages were either released or had escaped.

On June 13, 2001, the number of hostages was calculated at around 28, as three more people were found beheaded in Basilan, including Guillermo Sobero. They were beheaded since the Philippine Army would not halt the rescue operation.

The Burnhams were still in the group of 14 still held captive, according to three hostages who escaped in October 2001. On June 7, 2002, after a year of the hostages being held captive, a rescue mission was conducted resulting in the deaths of Martin Burnham and a nurse named Ediborah Yap after they were caught in the crossfire. Martin was killed by three gunshots to the chest while Gracia Burnham was wounded in her right leg. By this time Nur Misuari ordered his supporters to attack government targets to prevent the holding of elections on ARMM in November 2001, ushering his exit as the governor of the region. Misuari would be later arrested in 2007 in Malaysia and was deported back to the Philippines for trial.

In July 2004, Gracia Burnham testified at a trial of eight Abu Sayyaf members, identifying six of the suspects as being her former captors, including Alhamzer Limbong, Abdul Azan Diamla, Abu Khari Moctar, Bas Ishmael, Alzen Jandul and Dazid Baize. Fourteen Abu Sayyaf members were sentenced to life imprisonment while four were acquitted. Alhamzer Limbong was later killed in a prison uprising.

These rebel groups, especially the Abu Sayyaf, conducted several terror attacks, namely the bombings at Zamboanga in October 2002; the bombing of SuperFerry 14 in February 2004; the simultaneous bombings in Central Mindanao in October 2006; the beheadings of several Philippine Marines in July 2007; the Batasang Pambansa bombing in November 2007; and the 2009 bombings in Mindanao.

One thousand MILF rebels under the command of Umbra Kato have seized control of thirty-five villages in the Cotabato province. Two thousand Philippine troops with helicopters and artillery were sent into the seized area on August 9 to liberate it from the rebels. The MILF had wanted Cotabato to be included in the Autonomous Region in Muslim Mindanao. The government and MILF had been negotiating for the inclusion of the province in the Muslim Autonomous Region but the Supreme Court had struck down the proposal after hearing concerns from local Christian leaders in the region.

The rebel troops were ordered to leave the area by their commanders, but the contingents under Kato refused to leave the villages they had occupied and instead dug in. The Philippine Army responded on August 9 by bombarding them. The next day, the government forces moved to retake the villages, recapturing two of them from the rebels.

Numerous clashes erupted between the Philippine Army and rebel groups, such as the clash on June 14, 2009, that killed 10 rebels.

Between 2002 and 2015, the Philippines and the United States were part of a joint military campaign against Islamist terrorism known as Operation Enduring Freedom – Philippines. This was part of the war on terror.

== Benigno Aquino administration (2010–2016) ==
=== Peace talks and Aquino-Murad meeting ===
During the term of President Benigno Aquino III, a series of peace talks for the cessation of hostilities was held, including the meeting of MILF Chair Al Haj Murad Ibrahim in Tokyo, Japan which was lauded on both sides. Norway also joined the International Monitoring Team (IMT) in January 2011, overseeing the ceasefire agreement between the government and MILF on Mindanao. Despite the peace talks, a series of conflicts erupted. On September 10, 2011, Jal Idris, a hardcore member of Abu Sayyaf, was arrested by government forces after a crossfire between the Philippine Army and the rebel group The Armed Forces of the Philippines also killed three Abu Sayyaf militants in a stand-off the day after the arrest of Jal Idris.

Terrorism continued throughout President Aquino's term. Notable cases include when four merchants and a guide were killed by Abu Sayyaf bandits in January 2011. Later a soldier was killed in a clash against the rebels. In August 2011, rebel factions attacked a village in Sulu, killing seven Marines and taking seven civilians captive. They later freed two of the hostages after a ransom was paid. Also, several areas of Mindanao were bombed in August by the government, and a Filipino businesswoman was abducted in September 2011, who was later freed after the three gunmen were gunned down by the Armed Forces of the Philippines.

On October 20, 2011, the MILF was blamed for an attack on 40 government soldiers in the province of Basilan, which led to the deaths of 19 soldiers and six MILF fighters. This violated the ceasefire agreement between the government and MILF, which caused outrage in the government and led to the continuation of the war against terrorism in the country.

In February 2013, two main camps of the Abu Sayyaf group were overrun by forces of the Moro National Liberation Front (MNLF) in its latest offensive in Patikul. According to MNLF leader Nur Misuari, the MNLF offensive against the Abu Sayyaf is because of the MNLF opposition to the Abu Sayyaf's human rights abuses, which go against Islam.

=== Zamboanga City crisis ===
The Zamboanga City crisis erupted on September 9, 2013, when a MNLF faction known by other groups as the Rogue MNLF Elements (RME), under the Sulu State Revolutionary Command (SSRC), led by Ustadz Habier Malik and Khaid Ajibon attempted to raise the flag of the self-proclaimed Bangsamoro Republik at Zamboanga City Hall (which had earlier declared its independence on August 12, 2013, in Talipao, Sulu), and took civilians hostage. This armed incursion was met by the Armed Forces of the Philippines (AFP) and the Philippine National Police (PNP), which sought to free the hostages and expel the MNLF from the city. The standoff degenerated into urban warfare, and had brought parts of the city under a standstill for days. On September 28, the government declared the end of military operations in Zamboanga City after successfully defeating the MNLF and rescuing all the hostages.

=== Comprehensive Agreement on the Bangsamoro ===
On January 24, 2014, the Philippines government chief negotiator Miriam Coronel-Ferrer and MILF chief negotiator Murad Ebrahim signed a peace agreement in Kuala Lumpur. The agreement would pave the way for the creation of the new Muslim autonomous entity called "Bangsamoro" under a law to be approved by the Philippine Congress. The government aims to set up the region by 2016. The agreement calls for Muslim self-rule in parts of the southern Philippines in exchange for a deactivation of rebel forces by the MILF. MILF forces would turn over their firearms to a third party to be selected by the MILF and the Philippine government. A regional police force would be established, and the Philippine military would reduce the presence of troops and help disband private armies in the area. On March 27, 2014, the peace process concluded with the signing of the Comprehensive Agreement on the Bangsamoro between the Government of the Philippines and the Moro Islamic Liberation Front.

The New York Times claimed that the peace deal between the Philippines and MILF "seeks to bring prosperity to the restive south and weaken the appeal of the extremist groups", and linked the winding down of an American military counterterrorism operation to increased American military cooperation with the Philippines against China. The New York Times hailed Mr Aquino's peace agreement as an "accomplishment" as it reported on Aquino raising the alarm on China in the South China Sea. The New York Times editorial board published an article siding with the Philippines against China in the South China Sea dispute and supporting the Philippines' actions against China. The New York Times editorial board endorsed aggressive American military action against China in the South China Sea.

=== Abu Sayyaf association with ISIL ===
On July 23, 2014, Abu Sayyaf leader Isnilon Hapilon swore loyalty to Abu Bakr al-Baghdadi in a video, along with the rest of the organization, giving the Islamic State (known as ISIL and ISIS) a presence in the Philippines. In September 2014, the group began kidnapping people to ransom, in the name of ISIL.

=== Mamasapano clash ===
On January 25, 2015, the Philippine National Police's Special Action Force (SAF) conducted an operation to capture Abdul Basit Usman and the Malaysian terrorist leader Marwan in Mamasapano, Maguindanao. They were trapped between the MILF's 105th Base Command, the BIFF, and several armed groups. Forty four SAF members were killed on what is known as the Mamasapano clash, but they were able to eliminate Marwan. Alleged United States involvement in the botched operation would likely be a setback for a so-called Asian "pivot" by the United States Armed Forces.

In February 2015, the BIFF unsuccessfully fought for territory in the boundary of Maguindanao and Cotabato provinces. Subsequently, the Philippine Army, along with the Philippine Marines, declared a state of all-out-war against the BIFF. MILF forces were pulled out to prevent them from falling victim to the fighting.

== Duterte administration (2016–2022) ==
The MILF and MNLF have expressed their commitment to peace and in finally ending the 47-year-old insurgency while the offensive against Abu Sayyaf and other splinter groups have continued, with skirmishes in Jolo, Basilan and other parts of Mindanao. A bombing in Davao City in September 2016 killed 15 people.

=== Maute group attack and siege of Marawi ===
On May 23, 2017, the Maute group attacked Marawi, they were led by the Malaysian terrorists. President Rodrigo Duterte declared Proclamation No. 216, which placed the whole of Mindanao under a state of martial law and suspended the writ of habeas corpus. Clashes continued until October 2017 as the battle for Marawi City pitted Islamic militants against the Philippine government forces. Violence was severe. The government used heavy artillery and air strikes to shell Abu Sayyaf and Maute positions while the militant groups resorted to executing captured Christians. In 2018, two bombing incidents involving Abu Sayyaf and the BIFF occurred, one in Lamitan, Basilan and two separate incidents in Isulan, Sultan Kudarat.

=== Passage of the Bangsamoro Organic Law ===
On July 26, 2018, Duterte signed the Bangsamoro Organic Law, which abolished the Autonomous Region in Muslim Mindanao and provided for the basic structure of government for the Bangsamoro Autonomous Region, following the agreements set forth in the Comprehensive Agreement on the Bangsamoro peace agreement signed between the Government of the Philippines under President Benigno Aquino III and the MILF in 2014. From June 2019 to May 2022, as part of the "normalization process" of the Bangsamoro's war-to-peace transition, a total of about 19,200 former MILF combatants and 2,100 weapons were decommissioned.

=== Moro inter-clan war ===
In May 2020, Philippine media reported on clan warfare that displaced approximately 4,500 civilians from the affected areas. The previous year, there was a bloody clash between two large families, forcing hundreds of people to flee. Inter-clan violence known as rido can be traced back to pre-colonial power struggles between local tribal leaders. The strongmen of the time had significant economic and political power, and enforced that power through their own armed forces (militias).

== Bongbong Marcos administration (2022–present) ==
=== 2022 ===
On August 10, two armed Moro groups clashed in Pikit, Cotabato forcing hundreds of locals out of the area. According to local leaders, the attacks are related to prior fatal ambush of a barangay chairman, where the municipal police tagged two clans responsible for the murder of the official.

=== 2023 ===
On September 19, a civilian was hit by a stray bullet and killed in firefights between two rival clans affiliated with the MILF in Kaya-Kaya and Tukanolocong villages in Datu Abdullah Sangki, Maguindanao del Sur.

On November 23, a member of the Moro Islamic Liberation Front was killed while five others were wounded in explosions in Cotabato and Maguindanao del Sur.

Later during the year, the government declared that Sulu was free of Abu Sayyaf militants. In Basilan, the government announced that it would build 39 houses for former Abu Sayyaf members.

==== Mindanao State University bombing ====
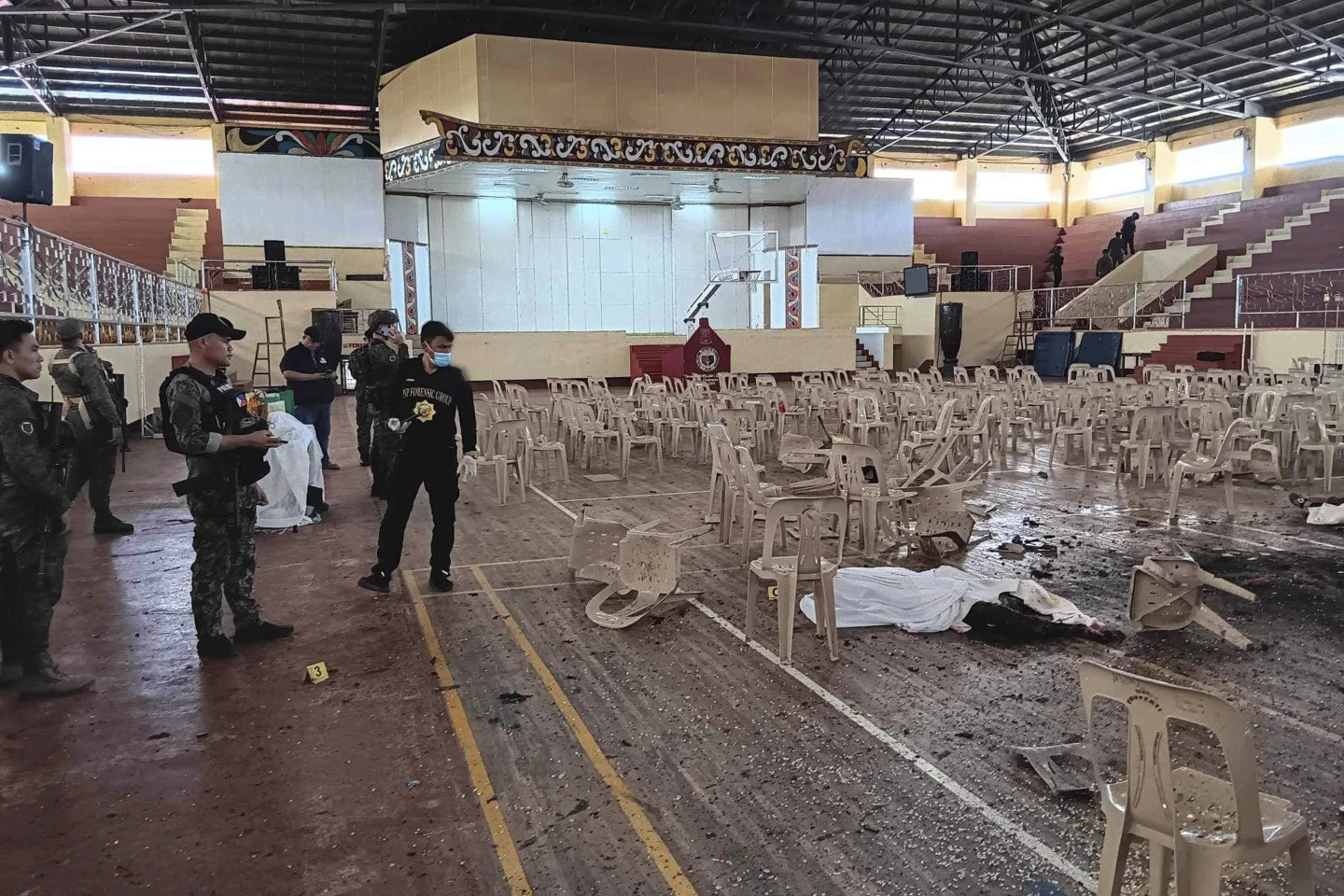
Mindanao State University bombing aftermath

On December 3, ISIS claimed responsibility for the deadly explosion during a Catholic mass in Mindanao State University on the same day that claimed four lives.

=== 2025 ===
On January 22, the Philippine Army were on their way to escort a United Nations Development Programme (UNDP) team when they were attacked by armed men allegedly linked to the MILF in Sumisip, Basilan. The attack occurred in the Bangsamoro region which is supervised by a transition government led by the MILF. Two soldiers died and twelve were injured. The MILF side sustained two casualties. It is considered the most serious breach of the Comprehensive Agreement on the Bangsamoro of 2014.

=== 2026 ===
On January 23, four soldiers were ambushed and killed in Lininding, Munai, Lanao del Norte by the Dawlah Islamiya-Maute Group (DI-MG). The local troops were on a humanitarian mission when the attack occurred.

On April 17, suspected members of the DI-MG opened fire to the Philippine Army and police officers who were attempting to serve arrest warrants to their commander in Marantao, Lanao del Sur. The clash killed 10 suspected members of the group.

== See also ==
- Communist rebellion in the Philippines
- Cross border attacks in Sabah
- Demographics of the Philippines
- Freedom of religion in the Philippines
- History of the Philippines
- Islam in Asia
- Islam in the Philippines
- Manili massacre
- Moro people
- Moro Rebellion
- Peace process with the Bangsamoro in the Philippines
- Refugees of the Philippines
- Religion in the Philippines
- Rohingya conflict
- Rohingya genocide
- South Thailand insurgency
- Spanish–Moro Wars
- Terrorism in the Philippines
