= Timeline of the Moro conflict =

This is a chronology of the Moro conflict, a low level conflict in the southern Philippines, involving jihadist groups such as the Abu Sayyaf Group, the Maute Group, Jemaah Islamiyah, and Islamic State affiliates, mainstream separatist groups such as the Moro Islamic Liberation Front (MILF), the Moro National Liberation Front (MNLF) and the Bangsamoro Islamic Freedom Fighters (BIFF), and the Philippine Government since 1971. Much of the fighting has been concentrated on the island of Mindanao and the Sulu archipelago, with spillover incidents and attacks occurring in the Philippine capital Manila and neighboring countries such as Malaysia.

As of 2019, the conflict has ended between separatist groups, but the Islamic State Insurgency continues.

== 1960s ==
=== 1968 ===
- May – The Muslim (later Mindanao) Independence Movement (MIM), a secessionist organization, is launched by its would-be chairman, newly retired Cotabato governor Datu Udtog (or Udtug) Matalam, to campaign for an independent Islamic Republic comprising Mindanao, Palawan and Sulu Archipelago.

=== 1969 ===
- Moro National Liberation Front (MNLF), the country's major Muslim group, is founded by Nur Misuari. Its first members are the youth recruited by traditional leaders for military training in Malaysia. Misuari has decided to fight for an independent Bangsamoro homeland as a result of the 1968 Jabidah massacre, but their original objective is later reduced to accepting autonomy within the country, being under pressure from the Organization of Islamic Conference. Its armed group is Bangsa Moro Army. By 2000, it has main bases, from Zamboanga Peninsula to parts of the Autonomous Region in Muslim Mindanao and the Soccsksargen.
- Hashim Salamat establishes the organization Nurul Islam to promote Islamic renewal in Cotabato. Both Salamat and his organization are aligned with the MIM by 1970.

== 1970s ==
=== 1971 ===
- 19 June – Suspected members of an extremist Christian group Ilagas ("Rats") storm in a mosque in Carmen, Cotabato, where Moslems are waiting for a scheduled conference between the warring communities, and gun them down. At least 65 Muslims, including 13 children and 29 women, are killed.
- 9 August - Ilaga militiamen massacred 60 Moro Muslim civilians in Buldon, Maguindanao Del Norte
- 26 October - 22 Philippine Constabulary were ambushed in Lanao del Norte, on Magsaysay town, resulting in the deaths of 17 troopers
- 27 October - 66 Moslems were killed in a battle in Magsaysay town

=== 1972 ===
- 28 June – early July – Bands of Moslem Barracudas, reportedly travelling by motorized boats from the Sulu Archipelago to southwestern Mindanao, raid coastal villages in Zamboanga del Sur; particularly about 100 in two villages in Mabuhay and one in Dimataling. A total of 58–67 Christians are reported massacred; another hundred are injured. The attacks are an apparent reprisal for the killing of Muslims by Ilagas in the province.
  - Early July – Raiders enter Dimataling, hack the Christian mayor to death, and kill two policemen and six soldiers.
- 21 September – President Ferdinand Marcos imposes martial law; its principal reasons are the existence of armed conflict between Muslims and Christians and a Muslim "secessionist movement" in the country's south. However, in fact, within months prior, neither serious incidents of sectarian violence nor activities by the MIM have been reported; the imposition results in an armed Muslim insurgency against the state, and leads to hostilities in Muslim Mindanao.
- Mid-October:
  - Marcos announces being prepared to deploy all troops in the country's south to "annihilate" outlaws if all guns would not be surrendered prior to 25 October deadline.
  - Marawi, Lanao del Sur, is attacked by more than 400 armed Maranaos who would be defeated by army forces after three days.
- Late October – Fighting begins between Muslim rebels and government soldiers in Cotabato.
- November – Marcos sends thousands of troops to Mindanao. By month's end, fierce clashes with separatist rebels are occurring throughout the country's south.
- 26 November – Battle in Sibalu Hill resulted a defeat for the Philippine Marine Corps including 43 Marines killed
- 27 November – An encounter occurs in a hill on Jolo island; government forces suffer defeat.
- 24 December – A Philippine Air Force C-47 with a crew of seven is shot down by Muslim dissidents during a fighting in southern Sulu.
- 26 December – The military reports that since September, at least 46 soldiers and 92 Muslim dissidents have been killed, and there are half a million refugees in areas of Mindanao, in the ongoing fighting.
- Late December – A military strike force overruns a rebel training camp in eastern Mindanao with 40 rebels killed.
- 28 December – Government troops attacks the guerrilla stronghold on Jolo island; military's victory reported. Officials report at least 14 troops are killed and more than 20 are wounded.
- 30 December:
  - A government patrol kills 25 rebels in Basilan City, Zamboanga del Sur.
  - Military forces captures Sibalo Hill on Jolo island, used as training camp an command post by Moslem rebels, after a massive assault.
- As political groups are banned, martial law causes the dissolution of aboveground organizations as the MIM and Nurul Islam. The underground MNLF is then activated, and will be involved in the developing insurgency by yearend.
- 2 January:
  - President Marcos calls a peace conference with about 200 Muslim leaders to forge a peace alliance between the national government and minority Filipino Moslems in Mindanao and Sulu. He likewise plans a next day's conference with 170 leaders to explain his order allowing barter trade between the country's south and Borneo.
  - The military announces that in the past two weeks, fighting has resulted in the deaths of 38 Muslim dissidents and 10 government troops in 12 encounters.

=== 1973 ===
- By that year, the entire core leadership of the MNLF is operating from abroad. Misuari has left Manila after the imposition of martial law, fleeing to Sabah and to Libya.
- January - The Moro National Liberation Front controlled 80 percent of Basilan
- 22-24 March - Philippine forces captured Labangan from the MNLF killing 200 rebels and 15 government soldiers
- 14-21 July - MNLF rebels and government forces clashes in the Zamboanga Peninsula killing 350 MNLF rebels and 25 government troops

=== 1974 ===
- By that year, the MNLF central committee has almost all of its members in Tripoli, Libya. Its chairman and vice-chairman are Misuari and Salamat, respectively. Immediately after the start of martial law, Salamat and his companions are forced underground when Datu Udtug signs an "affidavit" against them, which is turned over to the Philippine Army; shortly, the group joins forces with Misuari, and Salamat goes to Tripoli. Meanwhile, Abul Khayr Alonto, member of a prominent Maranao family, is the overall field commander of the Bangsa Moro Army, being among the few top leaders to remain in the country. The MNLF's military branch probably has between 10,000 and 30,000 men.
- February – In the fiercest engagement of the Moslem conflict, Jolo, Sulu, is burnt to the ground by the military.
- 20 June – Muslim guerrilla attacks begin in central Mindanao area.
  - On 20 June, insurgents stage a mortar attack on an airport in Cotabato City; fighting occurs near the area the following day, with an ambush on an army patrol in Tunuel that kills 17 soldiers.
  - On 20 June, rebels attack the Maria Cristina Falls hydroelectric plant which is slightly damaged by an explosion. Two workers are killed and a guard is injured.
  - Rebels simultaneously attack the barrios in Midsayap and Pikit in Cotabato. In Midsayap, a raid on 20 June kills four soldiers; more than 19,000 persons are evacuated within 6 days.
  - On 21 June, a force of Muslim, Christian, and Bilaat tribesmen attacks Makilala, Cotabato, killing 12 villagers.
  - By 21 June, thirty-one bodies of slain Christians are reported found during a 10-day trek by refugee families in Cotabato.
- 5 September – Five suspected Christian raiders massacred 28 Muslim civilians in Zamboanga City, it is said to be retaliation for the killings of 26 Christians two weeks ago.
- 1 September – 40 MNLF rebels are killed on Sacol Island
- 15 November - Moro rebels launched an attack on Poblacion, Cotabato capturing more than 300 people
- 19 November – A battle in Karundung resulted in 19 Philippine Marines killed and 14 wounded.
- 20 or 28 December – Moslem rebels capture a logging camp in Zamboanga City and hold at least 63 people. The hostage-taking would last until early January 1975.

=== 1975 ===
- 10 January – A battle on Muslim insurgents on the isolated camp in north of Zamboanga City, results in the deaths of the rebel leader and two others. Later, 56 Christian workers in a logging camp, among those held since late December, are found killed; their bodies have been either mutilated or beheaded by guerrillas after failed negotiations for their release. The massacre is one of the deadliest single incident in the conflict.
- 13 January – Rebels attack Marawi, Lanao del Sur, attempting to destroy a radio station and the Muslim Information Center of the Mindanao State University.
- 14 January – Moslem guerrillas wipe out at least 40 troops in Maimbung, Sulu, also one of the deadliest single attacks. Thereafter, the Philippine Air Force attacks rebel positions in the Jolo island.
- January:
  - The Air Force launches air strikes against rebels, who have launched mortar attacks against a training base and headquarters of the Central Mindanao Command in Cotabato City.
  - The military enters the western coast of the Zamboanga peninsula area in an attempt to prevent the gunrunners in supplying the rebels. At the same time, a rebel presence is reported in Pagadian, Zamboanga del Sur.
  - A Filipino team, headed by executive secretary Alejandro Melchor, meets with the MNLF in Jeddah, Saudi Arabia. Among the members of negotiating team is Rear Admiral Romulo Espaldon, commander of the southwestern Mindanao area. The seven-member team includes Dr. Cesar Majul, head of the Liberal Arts Department of the University of the Philippines; a Moslem; and government officials. The MNLF is represented by its spokesmen, Hashim Salamat of Cotabato, and Hdul Hamid Lukman, a former judge in Maimbung, Sulu. Neither their departure nor the meeting is announced by the national government; the news on the fighting is not reported by the government-controlled media.
- 9 March – The military reports that an attack is launched against Muslim insurgents—an estimated 4,000—in northeast Basilan, while a clash in Jolo, Sulu, results in the deaths of three soldiers and four civilians. At that time, MNLF has 16,000 armed men; and these insurgents have killed at least 1,750-3,000 Government soldiers, the Moro Rebels controlled large portions of Mindanao, and successfully engaged the Armed Forces of the Philippines (AFP) in the battlefield. It was reported that most of the 114 officers of the Philippine Military Academy (PMA), the country's highest military academy and training school, were killed in just a year.
- 12 March:
  - The social welfare department issues official figures on refugees in Mindanao for the first time following the government lifting of a news blackout on the hostilities two weeks prior. It shows that more than a million persons—comprising almost 185,000 families—has evacuated from their homes in 7 cities and 11 provinces; most of them are from South Cotabato, Zamboanga City, and Sulu.
  - The defense department, on its latest progress report on fighting in Basilan concentrating on about 4,000 rebels, says that the troops have repulsed sporadic rebel attacks and have inflicted "moderate casualties" on the insurgents. Military figures earlier report that 106 insurgents have been killed in the island.
- August – A truck is ambushed in Misamis Oriental; 32 Muslim passengers are reportedly killed.
- 9 August - A clash on the Island of Jolo killed 69 Moro rebels and 6 government soldiers

=== 1976 ===
- By early February, unofficial count by the Roman Catholic priests on casualties runs as high as 13,000, which includes soldiers, rebels, and civilians.
- 1 February – A gang of about 25 Muslims ambush a bus at north of Zamboanga City, while travelling to Ipil, Zamboanga del Sur, killing 25 persons and wounding 30.
- Negotiations between the national government and the Moro rebels is held in Tripoli, Libya, and is also participated by the Organization of Islamic Conference. An agreement on autonomy is reaches later that year, but would be disagreed in follow-up talks in Manila in April 1977.

=== 1977 ===
- By that year, the government estimates that there are as many as million displaced civilians in the country's south and at least 200,000 more who have fled to Sabah, Malaysia.
- 10 October – A general and 34 soldiers, who are trying to negotiate with a Muslim chief, are killed in Sulu. The armed forces conducts a campaign on the whole island thereafter.
- December – Salamat, also rebel chief of the Maguindanao community, decides to challenge the leadership of MNLF chairman Misuari. Salamat and Misuari is supported by Egypt and Libya, respectively.

=== 1978 ===
- Early 1978 – Alonto of the Maranao tribe enters a peace agreement with the national government after breaking with Misurari.
- 30 April - MNLF rebels and government forces clashed in Island of Basilan resulting in the deaths of 80 rebels and 11 soldiers
- July:
  - Twenty people are slain in clashes in Lanao and Sulu provinces.
  - A seaborne group of 30 rebels attack and burn the municipal hall of Maco, Davao del Norte.
  - A rebel group burns 15 houses in Kibawe, Bukidnon.
- 12 July – Forty-five rebels are reported land in a part of Palawan.

== 1980s ==
=== 1980 ===
- Mid-April – Initial reports, particularly a confidential police report dated April 6 which is apparently based on the accounts of three survivors, on the massacre of 29 individuals being herded by the marines onto Bongao Island, appear.
- November 15 – Police kills eight suspected MNLF members at a roadblock in Zamboanga City, hours after receiving a tip on a plan to kidnap the president of a local college.
- December 2 – A grenade attack by suspected Moslem rebels at a bus stop in Zamboanga City kills 3 and injures 45.

=== 1984 ===
- Moro Islamic Liberation Front (MILF) is formally established. It has been called itself the "New MNLF," a group which has been broken away from the MNLF in 1978 and being led by Central Committee member Salamat Hashim.

=== 1986 ===
- 23 April - A report states that Ferdinand Marcos once claimed that more than 100,000 Philippine soldiers lost their lives in the Moro War, it is not mentioned whether if he referred to a specific period or to the entirety of the conflict.

=== 1987 ===
- January - By January, the MNLF strength is estimated by the military at 6,000.
- 14 January – In a worst outbreak of Muslim-related violence in the decade, a battle occurs between the army and 700 rebels setting up roadblocks in Pikit, Cotabato. Within three days, 21 guerillas, two militiamen and seven civilians are killed; a rebel and 56 civilians are injured.
- 16 January – A bid by 300 Muslim guerrillas to blow up government buildings in Marawi, Lanao del Sur, including the Mindanao State University, is foiled by the army.

=== 1988 ===
- 31 January – Sixty heavily armed Moslem rebels attack an army detachment in Cotabato. A battle with the military ensues; six rebels and a soldier are killed; three soldiers are injured.
- Late June or early July – Ten Moslem separatist rebels are killed and five soldiers are injured in an encounter in Zamboanga del Norte.

== 1990s ==
- Late 1990s – MILF claims having 120,000 fighters, in addition to its supporters. Estimates on its strength ranges from 8,000 (military) to 40,000 (Western intelligence sources).

=== 1991 ===
- Abu Sayyaf, the smallest but most radical of the separatist groups in Mindanao, first appears. Founded by Abdurajak Abubakar Janjalani, it begins in mid-1980s as Tabligh (Spread the Word), an organization established in the country in 1972 by missionaries of Islam from Iran, whose military arm becomes known as Mujahedin Commando Freedom Fighters. Janjalani is a former MNLF member and a veteran of the Afghan War. The group's main base is on Basilan, but its operations expand to Sulu and Manila.

=== 1992 ===
- December 7 – Abogado Gado (Commander Mubarak), leader of the National Security Command, an elite MNLF combat unit, is killed in a shootout with the Marines during a raid on his hideout in Pantukan, Davao del Norte. Mubarak started the kidnapping trend, which was stopped in the 1960s, in Central Mindanao in 1990 when he is believed to have masterminded that of 89 Chinese-Filipino residents of the area. Since then, his group collected at least ₱130 million in ransom from activities which reportedly involves law enforcers. After Mubarak's death, the gang would be reorganized into smaller groups, including one by Faisal Marohomsar, a Maranaw and a key leader of the Pentagon gang while others are being led by his Maguindanaoan lieutenants. Marines attached to the Presidential Anti-Organized Crime Task Force would "neutralize" 48 kidnap gang members in the region between 1998 and 2000.

=== 1994 ===
- Military estimates put the MNLF strength at 14,080. Meanwhile, the group claims a much higher figure, as well as a considerable number of "secret forces".
- 8 June - Abu Sayyaf fighters attacked a convoy in Basilan separating the passengers by religion, And massacring 15 Christian civilians
- 28 November - Eight army soldiers were killed by Abu Sayyaf in Basilan after they were ambushed by around 100 bandits

=== 1995 ===
- April 4 - Abu Sayyaf is involved in an attack on Ipil, Zamboanga del Sur, that killed 50 people.
- April 14 - Thirty-nine Abu Sayyaf rebels who reportedly participated in the raid on Ipil were killed by government troops
- September 26 - Clashes in Maguindanao between the Moro Islamic Liberation Front and Government forces killed six people
- December 27–31 – Suspected Abu Sayyaf militants kidnap 20 people, including four Americans, from a resort at Lake Sebu, South Cotabato. In the following days, all the hostages either escape or are released as the government promises for civil improvements in Mindanao. Two of the kidnappers are later captured.

=== 1996 ===
- The size of the Moro Islamic Liberation Front is estimated at 8,000
- January 7 – Clashes between the army troops and at least 60 suspected Abu Sayyaf guerrillas, involved in the hostage-taking in South Cotabato, kill 10 rebels and injure five others.
- April 8 - Heavy fighting between the Philippines government and the Moro Islamic Liberation Front in Cotabato kills eleven people including a three year old girl
- October 22 – Fighting between the military and the MILF begins in Basilan, particularly in Tipo-Tipo. At least 33 guerillas are reported killed within four days. Following a failed 48-hour ultimatum for the rebels to leave the area, a rebel camp is attacked in a military offensive on October 27. Further clashes until November 8 result in the deaths of at least ten soldiers.
- October 24 – Military encounters against the MILF begin in Pikit, Cotabato, resulting to deaths of at least 12 civilian Muslims and 30 government soldiers. More than 5,000 residents evacuate as a result; as a hundred families in a village are reported trapped in their homes.
- November 4–5 – MILF attacks military camps in Zamboanga del Norte where five military and CAFGU personnel are killed in Barangay Panubigan.
- November 25 – In Kidapawan, Cotabato, a bomb explosion damages a ten-wheeler truck while an attempted bus bombing is prevented. These incidents, as well as a series of explosions in Cotabato City where 15 civilians are injured, are alleged to be perpetrated by elements linked to the MILF.

=== 1997 ===
- January:
  - Three men are executed by firing squad of eleven MILF rebels in Linamon, Lanao del Norte, as they have been suspected of killing a rebel leader after stealing his car on January 2.
  - The integration of 5,000 MNLF members to the Philippine National Police, being part of one of the agreements during peace talks, is suspended.
- June 16-27 - Heavy fighting in an MILF owned Camp Raja Muda killed 245 MILF fighters
- October:
  - MILF rebels publicly execute by firing squad two men, convicted of various crimes by its Shariah court, in Lanao del Sur. Photographs of which are published in the October 9 issue of the Philippine Daily Inquirer. The MILF, recognizing Islamic laws rather than the country's laws and constitution, claims that such summary executions are "in accordance with [the Koran];" with its chief negotiator Ghadzali Jaafar reportedly saying that they "[do not] recognize the authority and jurisdiction" of the national government "over Mindanao, the Bangsamoro and [their natives]." Meanwhile, the national government later condemns the incident, and President Fidel Ramos orders a manhunt on the executioners.
  - House speaker Jose de Venecia announces that Jaafar, also MILF vice chairman for political affairs, agrees to stop MILF's public executions "of Christians" convicted by its Shariah court. At least twelve people have been executed, including seven earlier that year; while eight others are scheduled to be executed in Camp Abubakar in Matanog, Maguindanao, until yearend.

=== 1998 ===
- MNLF enters civilian politics following a 1996 peace agreement. Only leaders elected in 1998 are Muslimin Sema and Hassim Amin, as mayor of Cotabato City and as representative of the 1st district of Sulu, respectively.
- 18 December - Abu Sayyaf founder Abdurajak Abubakar Janjalani is killed in a police encounter during december.

=== 1999 ===
- The size of the Moro Islamic Liberation Front is estimated at around 15,420
- January – The Maranao Islamic Statehood raids a market in Marawi, Lanao del Sur.

== 2000s and later ==
=== 2000 ===
- The total force of the Abu Sayyaf is believed to be about 200.
- 30 January – A MILF attack on government troops in Carmen, Cotabato ended in a gunbattle with 7 MILF members killed and 3 soldiers wounded.
- March – The MNLF–Islamic Command Council, a breakaway group led by young fighters who have believed that Misuari has "lost authority" on the Moros following the 1996 peace agreement, makes a media appearance. It is based in the nine rice-producing towns—the Basak area—in Lanao del Sur.
- 16-18 March - The Military claimed that heavy fighting in Lanao Del Norte and Maguindanao against the MILF resulted in the deaths of 41 rebels and 6 soldiers
- 17 March – A MILF brigade led by an Abdullah Macapaar (Commander Bravo) reportedly held the siege of the municipal hall of Kauswagan, Lanao del Norte.
- 20 March - Sixty Abu Sayyaf fighters attacked an Army outpost in Sumisip, Basilan abducting seventy-seven people including students and a priest, The military also claimed that later on the rebels freed fifty of the students
- 2 April – Five MILF rebels and a soldier were killed in a clash in Matungao, Lanao del Norte.
- 7 May – Eleven soldiers from the 32nd Special Forces of the Armed Forces of the Philippines (AFP) were slain in an ambush by the ASG in Lantawan, Basilan, two of whom were beheaded
- July 16:
  - About 100 suspected guerrillas kill 21 Christians inside a mosque in Bumbaran, Lanao del Sur.
  - A bomb explosion by suspected MILF rebels at a market in Kabacan, Cotabato kills 4 people and injures more than 30 others.
- July 21 – About 40 rebels attack a village in Tulunan, Cotabato, killing three militiamen and injuring three members of a paramilitary group.
- July 23 – About 20 Muslim rebels ambush a truck carrying families of company workers in Balabagan, Lanao del Sur, killing 13, mostly Christians, and injuring 14.
- 16 September – Military offensive against the ASG began; 19 captives were later rescued; by mid-December, 205 ASG guerrillas and 12 from the military had been reportedly killed.
- 14 October - A MILF commander called "Commander Musa" was killed in an encounter in Sultan Kudarat during the encounter, An unknown amount of rebels were also wounded
- Early November – Government troops seized a hideout of the extremists in Talipao, Sulu, with several rebels killed in the assault.
- 10 November:
  - Combined government forces prevented an attempt by MILF rebels to take over the town proper of Upi, Maguindnanao and to kidnap Chinese residents; a gunbattle left 3 rebels dead.
  - A clash in Tuburan, Basilan between the militiamen and MILF rebels, who had reinforced the armed followers of a village chief, killed 2 MILF rebels and a militiaman.
  - Four ASG rebels were slain, as well as a soldier, in a clash between government forces and about 60 rebels in Talipao, Sulu.
- 11 November – MILF rebels attacked two buses while passing on the road in Pikit, Cotabato, killing a passenger and wounding 16 others.
- 23 November – Soldiers pursuing two groups of ASG fighters clashed with more than 80 guerillas in the jungle near Mt. Danao in Talipao, Sulu. Officials claimed an unknown number of rebels were slain.
- 17 December – The 12th Scout Ranger Company of the Philippine Army attacked an ASG hideout in Patikul, Sulu and fought against some 140 rebels; 7 ASG members, as well as a soldier, were killed.
- 18 December – Two MILF guerrillas were killed in a clash with the 44th Infantry Battalion in Sirawai, Zamboanga del Norte.

=== 2001 ===
- 2001 - Significant fighting between Government troops and Moro rebels resulted in the deaths of over 1,000 people in this year
- 11 March - Attacks by the Moro Islamic Liberation Front in Lanao del Norte and Maguindanao killed 8 people and wounded two others
- 27 May - Dos Palmas kidnappings
- 2 June - Siege of Lamitan
- 3 August - Abu Sayyaf fighters beheaded nine Christian villagers out of thirty hostages abducted in Basilan
- 22 December - The Philippine government accused the MILF of attacking government soldiers in the past 3 days, these attacks on Maguindanao and Cotabato resulted in two people being wounded, including a soldier

=== 2002 ===
- January - July - The United States committed 1,300 personnel and 93 million dollars to assist Philippine government personnel against Abu Sayyaf, called "Operation Balikatan"
- 21 February - An US MH-47E Chinook helicopter crashed in Basilan killing 10 US soldiers
- 2 March - Four MILF fighters were killed during a clash with government troops in Lanao del Sur
- 17 June - Abu Sayyaf and the United States had their first clash in Isabela, Basilan, no US personnel were wounded
- 21 June - Abu Sabaya, An Abu Sayyaf leader was killed by government troops in the Sulu Sea along with two other bandits
- 19 July - Eight MILF members were killed while a rebel commander was captured in a clash with Philippine troops in Lanao Del Sur, 4 soldiers were also killed in the clash
- 20 October - The Moro Islamic Liberation Front repulsed an attack by government troops in Datu Piang, Maguindanao del Sur claiming that they killed 11 soldiers and 7 other militias were missing
- 9 December - Airstrikes in Maguindanao reportedly killed one MILF fighter and wounded two others
- 24 December - A bombing at Datu Piang, Maguindanao del Sur killed 13 people including the Mayor, the attackers were suspected to be the MILF

=== 2003 ===
- 27 January - A major MILF camp named Camp Usman fell to Government troops, Seventeen rebels were killed and another seven were captured in the fighting according to government reports
- 11-16 February - Battle of the Buliok Complex
- 19 February – Mujib Susukan, a senior Abu Sayyaf leader who took part in numerous abductions and killings including one in Sipadan in 2000, is killed by troops.
- February - Major military offensives in Pikit, North Cotabato against the Moro Islamic Liberation Front resulted in 40,000 civilians forced to flee their homes
- 3 March - Ten members of the MILF were killed in an Airstrike in Maguindanao according to military officials
- March 10—13 - According to the Philippine Government, attempts by the MILF to retake the Buliok Complex would result in 200 rebels killed
- 12 March - Bombardment using Howitzers and 500 pound bombs in Pikit, North Cotabato killed 68 MILF rebels
- 18 March - Montong Sali, a leader of the Abu Sayyaf group and four other ASG fighters were killed in Tuburan, Basilan
- 16 April - A 14-year old Moro Muslim boy was tortured by suspected Christian militiamen in Carmen, Cotabato
- 18 April - Government troops attacked a MILF base during Good Friday in Sultan Kudarat resulting in the deaths of 13 soldiers and four others were wounded
- 19—22 May - A MILF commander along with 37 other fighters were killed while 100 other fighters were wounded during heavy bombardment in Lanao del Norte, Two soldiers were also killed and two scout rangers were wounded
- 3 December - Philippine Soldiers stormed a lair of the Abu Sayyaf in Maimbung, Jolo resulting in the deaths of 3 fighters
- 7 December - Ghalib Andang known as "Commander Robot" who Partook in the 2000 Sipadan kidnappings was captured by Pilipino soldiers after a gunfight in Jolo

=== 2004 ===
- 27 January - An ambush on Philippine soldiers in Patikul by Abu Sayyaf killed one and wounded 11
- February 26 - A ferry is bombed by Abu Sayyaf killing 116 People
- April 8 – A gunbattle between army troops led by Lt. Col. Noel Buan, commander of the 1st Scout Ranger Battalion, and a group of Abu Sayyaf leader Hamsiraji Sali in Makiri, Isabela, Basilan. Sali, one of five most wanted terrorists, and five followers are slain, as well as two members of Ranger team, are killed; three other soldiers are injured, including Buan and Sgt. Leopoldo Diokno. Buan and Sali, bringing only five men each, have signed the surrender of the three including Sali and his brother, when Sali notices some of 31 additional soldiers posted by Buan nearby, resulting in a "90-minute" firefight. Buan, a former New People's Army captive for 21 months, and Diokno would be awarded the Medal of Valor in a controversial move. On April 28, President Gloria Arroyo awards the Gold Cross medals for the slain soldiers.
- 17 August - A clash between the MILF and Philippine troops in Datu Saudi Ampatuan, Maguindanao killed three combatants
- 3 November - Clashes killed four MILF members and wounded three militiamen, breaking a two-year truce

=== 2005 ===
- 10 January - Heavy fighting in Mamasapano between the Moro Islamic Liberation Front and the Philippines government resulted in thirteen rebels being killed, And another eight government soldiers being killed as well
- 7 February - MNLF fighters would kill 13 Marines in Panamao, And in two days, fighting would kill another 40 soldiers and 30 rebels
- 10 February - Pilipino troops captured an Abu Sayyaf stronghold in Panamao, According to the military, Twenty bandits were killed while two personnel, Including a battalion commander were killed as a result of the fighting
- 14 February - Simultaneous bombings in the cities of Manila, General Santos, and Davao were perpetrated by Abu Sayyaf killing at least eight and injuring about 150
- 14-15 March - Abu Sayyaf fighters imprisoned at Camp Bagong Diwa rioted in an attempt to escape, 24 prisoners were killed while 3 guards and 1 Police officer were killed in the riot
- 23 June - Seven Abu Sayyaf members are sentenced to death for attacks on villagers during 2001 in Lamitan
- 29 October - A gunbattle in Patikul resulted in the deaths of 3 soldiers and 10 Abu Sayyaf bandits

=== 2006 ===
- 12 June - 40 MILF fighters attacked an army outpost in South Cotabato attempting to Overrun it however failing, There were no recorded casualties
- August - The Philippine government launched "Oplan Ultimatium" leading to the Demise of many Abu Sayyaf leaders and it also led to drastic decline of Abu Sayyaf membership to an estimated 200 members
- 4 September - Khadaffy Janjalani was killed in Patikul after a gunfight
- 1 October - A clash in Maguindanao wounded 5 MILF fighters
- 10 October – Bomb attacks by the Abu Sayyaf Group (ASG) in Makilala, Cotabato and Tacurong, Sultan Kudarat kill eight and injure at least thirty others.
- 18 October – At least three persons are killed in a bomb explosion, perpetrated by the ASG, near a police camp in Jolo, Sulu.

=== 2007 ===
- 8 February - Fighting in Midsayap, North Cotabato between the Moro Islamic Liberation Front and local militia groups would result in 8,000 People being displaced
- 20 April - Abu Sayyaf fighters beheaded seven workers whom they abducted on April 16, Dumping six of their bodies near Parang, Sulu
- 25 April - Scout Rangers allegedly massacred 10 Moro Muslims in Patikul, Jolo
- 8 May - A bombing in Tacurong, Sultan Kudarat killed eight people, The government accused Jemaah Islamiyah for the attack
- 10-11 July - Thirteen soldiers were initially killed, Ten were beheaded later on in Al-Barka, Basilan
- 9 August - MNLF fighters would kill 26 soldiers in clashes in Maimbung, The military claimed that the clashes involved Abu Sayyaf fighters
- 19 August - Heavy fighting in Basilan resulted in the deaths of 42 Abu Sayyaf fighters and 15 soldiers including five officers, seven soldiers were also wounded
- 21 August - Philippine marines sealed off all possible Abu Sayyaf escape routes in the island of Basilan
- 30 December - The military reported that about 35 MILF fighters were killed, 8 were captured and 52 surrendered on this year

=== 2008 ===
- 4 February - Philippine soldiers killed eight civilians in Maimbung, Jolo, including a 4-year old girl and a pregnant woman
- 14 February - A plot by the Abu Sayyaf to assassinate Philippine president Gloria Macapagal Arroyo is foiled by Security forces
- 3-12 June - 2008 Maimbung kidnappings
- 18 August - MILF fighters led coordinated attacks on five towns in Lanao Del Norte and Maasim killing more than 40 people including a Lieutenant Colonel and seized 69 hostages
- 19 August - The MILF released 67 out of 69 hostages seized during the attacks yesterday
- 29 August - MILF fighters led by Ameril Umbra Kato attacked soldiers in Datu Saudi Ampatuan however were repulsed after suffering heavy casualties
- 19 September - The Philippine military seized the main camp of the MILF in Lanao after a week-long campaign to seize it, During the fighting; at least seven rebels were killed while one soldier was killed and eight other soldiers were wounded, The military also failed to capture key MILF fighters
- 10 October - The Philippine military stated that more than 50 MILF rebels were killed during clashes in Sarangani
- 3 November - Christian militiamen killed 5 Muslims and wounded 5 others during an ambush on a vehicle in Lanao del Norte
- 7 December - A gunbattle with the Abu Sayyaf in the island of Basilan killed five government troops and wounded 24 others
- 25 December - MILF rebels attacked Midtungo village in Sultan Kudarat killing 6 people

=== 2009 ===
- 5 January - Three international Red cross workers in Sulu were abducted by Abu Sayyaf, they held one of the hostages for six months
- 6 January - An airstrike in Sultan Kudarat killed 12 MILF members
- 26 March - Heavy fighting in Mamasapano where Gloria Macapagal visited killed 20 MILF members and 7 soldiers
- 9 June - Camp Afghan and Camp Badir, Two major camps of the MILF were overrun by Government troops in Maguindanao
- 13 June - An ambush by Abu Sayyaf on Pilipino soldiers in Jolo would kill five soldiers and injure 11
- 9 July - The Moro Islamic Liberation Front claimed to have killed 500 government soldiers during 10 Months of fighting in Maguindanao, The Philippine government denied this claiming it was MILF propaganda
- 12-14 August - Intense fighting in Basilan between the Philippine government and Abu Sayyaf killed 31 bandits and 23 soldiers, 22 others were wounded as well
- December - Abdul Basir Latip, an Abu Sayyaf founder was reportedly arrested by Philippines government officials

=== 2010 ===
- 21 February - Albader Parad along with six other Abu Sayyaf fighters were killed during a military raid in Maimbung, Jolo
- 23 February - Abu Sayyaf fighters seeking retaliation for the death of Albader Parad attacked a Marine Detachment in the boundary between Maimbung and Indanan however were defeated
- 27 February - A militaman and 10 civilians were killed when Abu Sayyaf ambushed Tubigan village on Basilan
- 10 March - Government forces neutralized 20 Abu Sayyaf militants capturing 11 and killing nine during a raid in Sulu; however, their primary target, Zulkifli bin Hir (alias Marwan), evaded capture
- 13 April - Abu Sayyaf attacked civilians in Basilan utilizing bombs and firearms, Resulting in the deaths of 15 people
- 9 November - A school principal was abducted by Abu Sayyaf, was found beheaded after his family couldn't pay the Ransom

=== 2011 ===
- 6 April - A clash in Zamboanga Sibugay killed 9 Suspected Moro rebels including their leader
- 28 July - An intense firefight in Sulu resulted in the deaths of seven marines, While another 21 were wounded
- 25 September - Abu Sayyaf ambushed Pilipino marines in Jolo resulting in the deaths of 13 bandits and 2 soldiers According to an Army spokesmen
- 11 October - Despite an existing ceasefire, an armed confrontation occurred between MILF fighters and government troops on October 18, 2011 in Al-Barka, Basilan. The fighting resulted in the deaths of 19 soldiers and six Moro insurgents.
- 21 October - following the 2011 Al-Barka clash, MILF fighters and government troops clashed again in Zamboanga Sibugay province. The confrontation resulted in seven deaths
- 24 October - Suspected MILF guerrillas carried out two attacks on Basilan, killing five civilians and two soldiers.
- 27 November - Suspected Abu Sayyaf members set off bombs during a Christian wedding in Zamboanga City killing at least 3 people and wounding 27 others

=== 2012 ===
- 23 January – 193 MNLF combatants led by Hadji Obin Talab, Sharif Ahmad and Alawi Hajan allegedly defected to the MILF following a meeting in Barangay Marsada, Panglima Estino, Sulu. Ustad Habir Malik, operating in Luuk, Sulu, formerly led the MNLF defectors.
- 2 February - An airstrike in Parang killed three Abu Sayyaf leaders, Gumbahali Jumdail, Zulkipli Abdul Hir and Mumamda Ali along with twelve other bandits
- 11 July - A truckload of rubber plantation labourers were ambushed by Abu Sayyaf in Basilan killing six workers and wounding Twenty-two others
- 27 July - Clashes in Basilan between the Abu Sayyaf and Philippine government forces would kill Twelve soldiers and four extremists
- 28 July - The Philippine government claimed they captured Ahmadsali Badron, an Abu Sayyaf in the Island of Tawi-Tawi
- 10 September - 2 civilians would get injured from clashes between the MILF and the BIFF

=== 2013 ===
- 22 January - 7 Scout Rangers were wounded when Abu Sayyaf fighters ambushed them in Basilan
  - A feud in Sultan Kudarat between the Moro National Liberation Front and the Moro Islamic Liberation Front killed 4 combatants, wounding 6 others and also displacing 1,000 people
- 5 February - A clash in Patikul between the Moro National Liberation Front and Abu Sayyaf resulted in the deaths and beheadings of 8 MNLF members and 18 Abu Sayyaf bandits killed
- 11 February - 24 March - 2013 Lahad Datu standoff
- 25 May - A clash in Patikul between government troops and Abu Sayyaf would result in seven marines being killed, and Five Abu Sayyaf fighters being killed, Nine marines were wounded while an unknown amount of Abu Sayyaf fighters were wounded
- 9-28 September - Zamboanga siege
- 10 October - Pilipino Marines who were targeting Abu Sayyaf militants had a clash with MNLF remnants in Zamboanga City killing two rebels and seizing four automatic firearms

=== 2014 ===
- 27 January - Fighting in Cotabato between the Philippines government the Bangsamoro Islamic Freedom Fighters would result in hundreds of civilians forced to flee 40 BIFF fighters were also confirmed killed in the clashes along with one soldier
- 11-30 April - Battle of Basilan (2014)
- 11 April - A gunfight in Basilan would result in Twenty soldiers being wounded
- 29-30 April - Clashes in Sulu resulted in the deaths of twenty-five Abu Sayyaf bandits and one marine
- 9 June - BIFF bandits would attack Pilipino soldiers in Maguindanao resulting in the deaths of Three bandits
- 28 July - In Talipao, 23 people were killed, including five children and three senior citizens, when Abu Sayyaf launched bazooka and mortar attacks on jeepneys
- 2 November - Six soldiers were killed by Abu Sayyaf during an ambush in Basilan including a Second Lieutenant
  - Philippine soldiers of the 32nd Infantry Battalion seized two temporary encampments of the Abu Sayyaf during offensives in Patikul
- 23 November - Sihata Muallom Asmad, alias Sihata Latip an Abu Sayyaf leader, and an unidentified soldiers were killed during a gun battle in Parang, Sulu

=== 2015 ===
- 2015 - More than 160,000 people were killed from organized violence in Mindanao since the 1990s, and 3,500,000 more were displaced since 2000.
  - The Armed Forces of the Philippines reported that on this year, 133 Abu Sayyaf fighters were killed while 164 were wounded
- 25 January - Mamasapano clash
- 25 February - A gunfight in Patikul killed 2 Scout Rangers and 5 Abu Sayyaf bandits, 14 other ASG bandits and 9 Scout Rangers were also wounded
  - Military Offensives began against the Bangsamoro Islamic Freedom Fighters as to protect civilian communities under attack
- 26 March - 120,000 people were displaced ever since Military offensives bagan against the Bangsamoro Islamic Freedom Fighters in January
- 9 August - Two Abu Sayyaf fighters riding motorcycles ambushed and shot dead 2 soldiers in Jolo After buying from the Market and returning to camp
- 21 September - Abu Sayyaf gunmen abducted four people in an attack on Samal island, including two Canadians, one Norwegian and a Filipino woman
- December 24—25 - Militants of the Bangsamoro Islamic Freedom Fighters attacked Christian communities in Mindanao resulting in the deaths of 5 Militants and 9 Christian villagers
- 30 December - A Second Lieutenant was killed while seven other Soldiers were wounded during a clash with Abu Sayyaf in Sulu

=== 2016 ===
- 9 April - A clash in Basilan between the Armed Forces of the Philippines and 100 Abu Sayyaf fighters resulted in the deaths of eighteen soldiers and the wounding of 52; out of the 18 killed, four of them were beheaded
- 11 April - The Armed Forces of the Philippines stated that 13 Abu Sayyaf bandits were slain during a gun battle in Tipo-Tipo
- 30 May - The Philippine Government claimed that they killed 54 members of the Maute Group in Lanao Del Sur
- 7-12 July - The Philippine military claimed have killed 40 Abu Sayyaf fighters during separate clashes in Basilan and Jolo, As a result, One soldier was also killed in the clashes
- 29 July - Two separate clashes in Tipo-Tipo and Indanan resulted in the deaths of Six Abu Sayyaf members, Two of whom were sub-leaders
- 23-28 August - 21 Abu Sayyaf fighters were confirmed to be killed after Military offensives in Patikul occurred as retaliation for the beheading of an 18-year old hostage
- 30 August - 15 soldiers were killed by Abu Sayyaf in Patikul two of whom were beheaded
- 6 December – A soldier was killed while a policeman was wounded in separate clashes between government forces and suspected members of the Maute group in Butig, Lanao del Sur.
- 10 December – Three members of Abu Sayyaf, including a leader, were killed in a shooting between the police and the militants in Malaysia.
- 20 December – Four fishing boat crew were reportedly abducted off Sulu.
- 24 December – At least sixteen people, including a police officer, were injured in a blast outside a Catholic church in Midsayap, Cotabato.
- 28 December – Two bombs injured thirty-three people who were attending an amateur boxing match in the town of Hilongos, Leyte in the Visayas, well beyond the conflict zone in Mindanao. Authorities believe that the BIFF or the Maute group are responsible.
- 29 December – A bomb exploded on a highway in Aleosan, Cotabato, wounding six people.
- 31 December – An improvised explosive device exploded outside the municipal gymnasium of Talitay, Maguindanao del Norte where a gathering for peace and unity was held on New Year's Eve, no one is injured.

=== 2017 ===
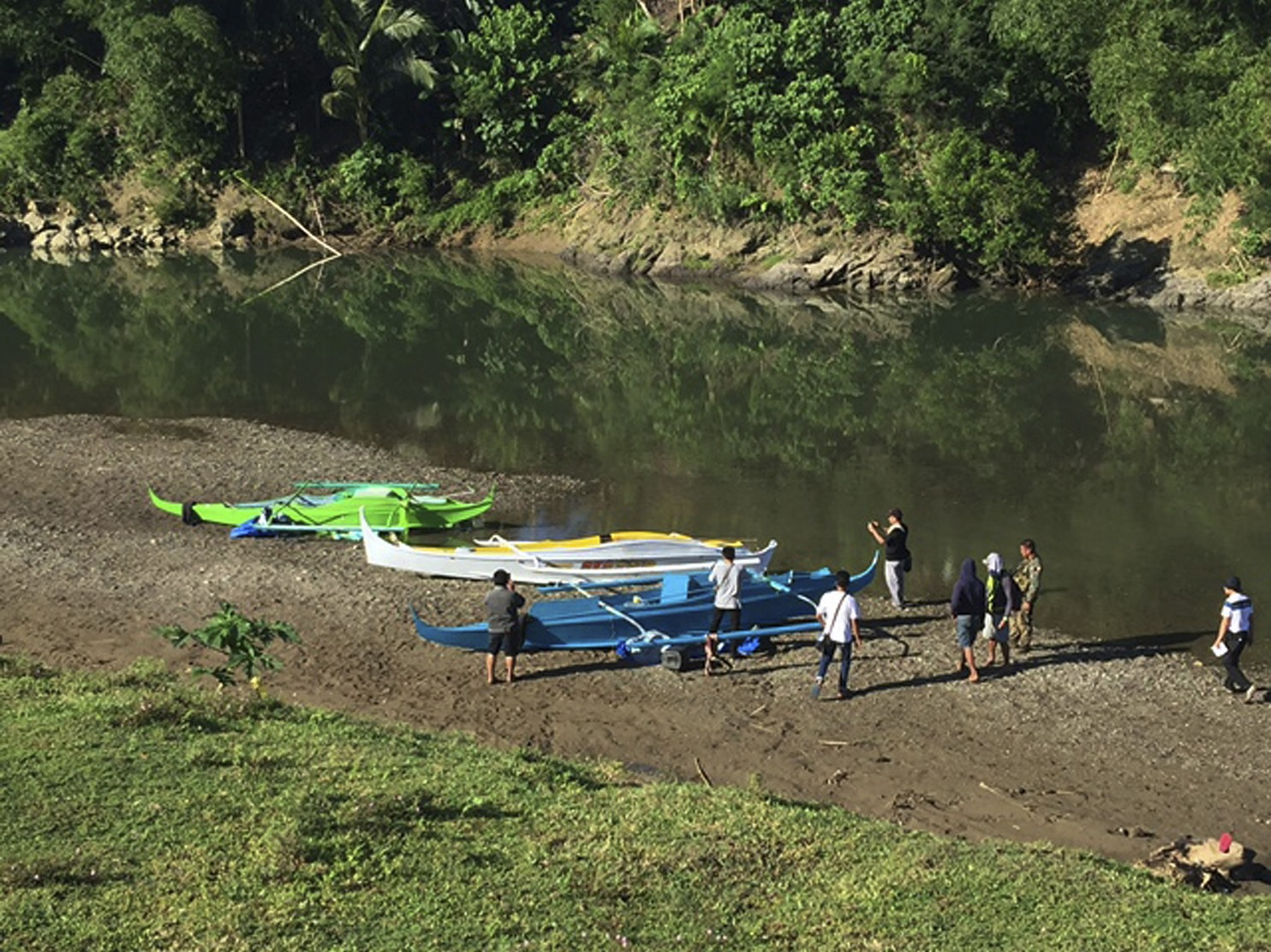
Pump boats used by Abu Sayyaf in 2017 Bohol attack

- 4 January – 2017 Kidapawan jail siege: Around 100 gunmen attack the Cotabato District Jail in Kidapawan City. A total of 158 inmates escape, fourteen of whom are quickly recaptured, while five others are killed.
- 29 January – Two children were killed and three others were injured when a bomb went off in Al-Barka, Basilan.
- 15 February – Eight passengers were wounded when suspected Abu Sayyaf gunmen shot at a bus on the outskirts of Zamboanga City.
- 27 February – a German sailor is beheaded by the Abu Sayyaf after being taken hostage since 5 November 2016.
- 16 March – A Vietnamese seafarer who was kidnapped on 19 February by the Abu Sayyaf is killed while trying to escape.
- 31 March – An improvised explosive device explodes in Midsayap, Cotabato before dawn wounding a pedicab driver and a minor.
- 11 April – 2017 Bohol clashes: The Abu Sauyaf Group launches an amphibious incursion into the province of Bohol in the Visayas, triggering a massive government operation that leaves 17 people dead.
- 1 June - A friendly fire Airstrike incident occurs in the Siege of Marawi Resulting in the deaths of Eleven soldiers and injuring Seven
- 13 July – The bullet-riddled body of Vietnamese national Tran Viet Van was re-covered in Barangay Buhanginan in Patikul, Sulu after being held hostage by the Abu Sayyaf.
- 28 July – Nine soldiers were injured when suspected militants set off an improvised explosive device (IED) in Rajah Buayan, Maguindanao.
- 18 August – Five fighters of the Moro Islamic Liberation Front (MILF) die in a clash with BIFF militants.
- 21 August – Nine people are killed, while sixteen others are wounded after Abu Sayyaf bandits attacked a village in Maluso, Basilan, targeting Christian settlers
- 16 October – The leader of the Abu Sayyaf Group, Isnilon Hapilon is killed by the Philippine Army, along with the co-founder of the Maute group Omar Maute in Marawi, Lanao del Sur.
- 23 October – The five-month-long siege in Marawi ended with the Philippine Government declaring victory.
- 24 October – The Maute group is declared "practically wiped out" by the Armed Forces of the Philippines following the deaths of the seven Maute brothers.
- 15 December – Remnants of the Maute group reportedly are recruiting new members around Marawi. The successor group has been labeled as the "Turaifie group" after its purported leader, Abu Turaifie.
- 31 December –
  - Two people were killed and sixteen others were injured when an improvised bomb went off along the national highway in Tacurong, Sultan Kudarat.
  - A policeman is killed while five others are injured when a bomb explodes as a police vehicle passes some 400 meters from the provincial headquarters of the Philippine National Police in Shariff Aguak, Maguindanao.

=== 2018 ===
- 1 January – Two soldiers from the 57th IB are injured when an improvised explosive device explodes near the provincial hospital in Shariff Aguak, Maguindanao.
- 8 January – Six BIFF fighters and a soldier were killed in a five-hour attack in Datu Unsay, Maguindanao
- 9 January – A soldier is killed while two civilians are injured when a suspected Islamic State-inspired group sets off two separate roadside bombs in Maguindanao
- 19 January – Two explosions rock Barangay Semba, Datu Odin Sinsuat, Maguindanao, believed to be the work of the Bangsamoro Islamic Freedom Fighters (BIFF). No one is hurt.
- 25 January – Two civilians are killed while another is injured in an improvised bomb explosion in a ricefield in Datu Piang, Maguindanao.
- 1 February – Two people are killed while four others are wounded when Abu Sayyaf bandits attack a private vehicle in Patikul, Sulu.
- 14 February – Members of the Abu Sayyaf Group abduct a government engineer in Jolo, Sulu.
- 18 February – Five soldiers, including a junior officer, are injured in a roadside bombing in Datu Unsay, Maguidanao.
- 28 March - Nurhassan Jamiri, an Abu Sayyaf leader surrendered in Basilan
- 29 April – Abu Sayyaf extremists kidnap four people, including two policewomen in Patikul, Sulu.
- 7 May – Three Abu Sayyaf terrorists are killed and seven soldiers wounded in an encounter in Patikul, Sulu.
- 13–14 May – Eleven Abu Sayyaf terrorists and three soldiers are killed and 17 others injured in several shootouts in Patikul, Sulu.
- 10 June – The Philippine Army launched an operation against Bangsamoro Islamic Freedom Fighters, led by Esmail Abdulmalik (Abu Toraife), in the southern Liguasan Marsh in the borders of Pagalungan and Gen. Salipada K. Pendatun in Maguindanao, where the group's main explosives facility and camp were destroyed by airstrikes; at least 15 BIFF members were killed, including five Indonesians and a Singaporean, 10 were injured, and a couple allegedly involved in bomb-making was captured. Eight other BIFF members were killed in succeeding military operations in Datu Unsay and Datu Hoffer Ampatuan in Maguindanao and in Midsayap, Cotabato.
- 16 June – A woman believed to be pregnant was killed while a 14-year-old boy was injured by mortar fire from members of the BIFF in General Salipada K. Pendatun, Maguindanao.
- 30 June – Militants of the BIFF detonate two bombs that rock the Barangay Hall of Timbangan, Shariff Aguak, Maguindanao. No one is injured in the incident.
- 1–4 July – Eight more members of the BIFF are killed in a series of clashes in Maguindanao.
- 18-20 July - Two separate clashes in Maimbung and Patikul resulted in the deaths of one soldier and five Abu Sayyaf fighters, while two other service members were wounded
- 31 July – A bomb exploded in a van and killed a suspected bomber, a soldier, four paramilitaries and four civilians, including a mother and her child, at a military checkpoint in Lamitan, Basilan. Twelve others are wounded.
- 23 August - During an encounter in Patikul, Jolo, Twenty soldiers were wounded while one Abu Sayyaf fighter was confirmed killed, The military claimed that Abu Sayyaf dragged off the other fighters killed in the encounter
- 28 August – Two civilians are killed and thirty-six injured by a homemade bomb during a street festival in Isulan, Sultan Kudarat.
- 2 September – 2018 Isulan bombings: A bomb blast in an internet café in Isulan, Sultan Kudarat kills 1 and injures 15. The attack is blamed on the Bangsamoro Islamic Freedom Fighters.
- 14 September – Clashes with the Abu Sayyaf in Patikul, Sulu result in 17 wounded from the military, while 7 Abu Sayyaf militants are killed and 6 wounded.
  - Seven Tausugs were massacred by Government troops in Patikul
- 16 September – Eight people are injured including a six-year-old girl, when a bomb went off in front of a pharmacy in General Santos. The police blame the pro-ISIS faction of the Bangsamoro Islamic Freedom Fighters for the bombing.

=== 2019 ===
- January 24 – Three members of the Maute group involved in the 2017 siege of Marawi are killed in a encounter with the military along the Sultan Dumalondong–Marogong municipal boundary in Lanao del Sur.
- January 27 – A suicide bombing in a Catholic church in Jolo, Sulu kills 23 people including an Indonesian couple suspected to be the perpetrators of the attack. The bombing is reportedly masterminded by Hatib Hajan Sawadjaan, leader of the Islamic State (IS) in the Philippines who had succeeded Isnilon Hapilon. Sawadjaan and his relatives are members of an Abu Sayyaf–Hapilon faction.
- January 31 - After the 2019 Jolo Cathedral bombings, The military bombarded Abu Sayyaf positions in Patikul in retaliation
- February 2 - Fresh military offensives against Abu Sayyaf in Patikul began as retaliation for the 2019 Jolo Cathedral bombings killing five soldiers and three fighters, Five soldiers and 15 fighters were also reportedly wounded in the offensives
- March 11 – Military operations against the remnants of the Maute group begin in Lanao del Sur. Prior to the March 14 encounter, four Maute militants and four soldiers are killed, including militant Abu Tahir, a bomb expert and alleged henchman of slain terrorist Zulkipli bin Hir.
- March 14 – The Army's 49th Infantry Battalion encounters the group of Owayda Marohombsar ("Abu Dar") in Tubaran, Lanao del Sur. Four insurgents including "Abu Dar" are reported killed, so as four soldiers; while two other soldiers are injured. However, Marohombsar's death is only confirmed by Philippine officials on April 14, citing DNA tests by United States authorities. Marohombsar, one of the leaders of the Marawi siege, assumed leadership of the Maute group and became the Southeast Asia emir of IS after the deaths of two Maute founding leaders and of Isnilon Hapilon, respectively; his group has been hunted since then.
- March 19 - Angah Ajid, an Abu Sayyaf leader who participated in the 2000 Sipadan kidnappings was killed by government troops in Talipao
- April 5 - Soldiers of the 5th Scout Ranger Battalion engaged in a 30-minute gunfight with around 80 Abu Sayyaf fighters in Patikul resulting the death of 3 soldiers and 4 fighers, 22 others were also wounded
- April 11 - Twelve suspected Abu Sayyaf members were killed during four separate clashes in Sulu including an aide of Radullan Sahiron
- April 23 - Government troops killed a brother of Mundi Sawadjaan in an encounter in Patikul, Sulu.
- May 19 - An Abu Sayyaf sub-leader named Angah Ajid along with an Unidentified man were killed during an encounter in Talipao
- May 25 - A clash in Patikul resulted in the deaths of Six Abu Sayyaf fighters, it also wounded five soldiers and two civilians
- May 26 - An attack on soldiers in Jolo killed two children
- June 29 - A suicide bombing perpetrated by Abu Sayyaf in Jolo killed 5 people including 3 soldiers
- October 4 - Seven former MILF rebels were killed in Maguindanao by members of the Dawlah Islamiyah

=== 2020 ===
- 16 January – Five Indonesian fishermen were kidnapped by the Abu Sayyaf (ASG), reportedly with the involvement of its sub-leader Injam Yadah, in the waters off Malaysia. One of them was killed in Sulu later that year; the rest were separately rescued by the troops in Tawi-Tawi in March 2021.
- 17 April - An ambush on Pilipino soldiers in Patikul by the Abu Sayyaf would result in 11 soldiers being killed, And another 14 being wounded
- 22 April - An encounter in Patikul resulted in six Abu Sayyaf fighters were killed and eight soldiers being wounded
- 6 June - Four Army troopers were killed, and 17 were wounded while two Abu Sayyaf members were killed during a clash in Patikul
- 6 July – A gunbattle between the ASG and the troops occurred in a jungle near Patikul, Sulu. The Philippine Army believed that Hatib Hajan Sawadjaan, leader of the Islamic State group in the southern Philippines, was wounded and later died.
- 24 August – Two ASG militants staged suicide bombings in Jolo, Sulu, killing at least 14 people and injuring 75 more. Military officials suspected Mundi Sawadjaan, Hatib Hajan's nephew, of plotting the attacks.
- 9 September - Five Abu Sayyaf bandits were killed while two soldiers were wounded during a clash in Zamboanga Sibugay
- 6 October - The Armed Forces of the Philippines published a reported stating that Fifty-five Abu Sayyaf fighters had died since January this year
- 3 November – A military offensive was launched against the ASG at the sea off Sulare Island in Parang, Sulu, resulting in the sinking of the boat used by fighters as well as the deaths of seven suspected ASG members including two brothers of Mundi Sawadjaan.
- The Armed Forces of the Philippines (AFP) reported that in 2020, sixty-eight ASG members were killed and another 128 surrendered in military operations. They also reported that from the Bangsamoro Islamic Freedom Fighters, 31 members died, 184 surrendered, and 22 were arrested; and from Maute group, 31 members died, 35 surrendered, and five were arrested.

=== 2021 ===
- March 19 - Military offensives against the BIFF in Maguindanao would result in the deaths of three BIFF members and the displacement of 15,000 civilians
- March 21 - Philippine Government troops killed Majan Sahidjuan alias "Apo Mike" an Abu Sayyaf leader in Tawi-Tawi and rescued four Indonesian hostages
- April 12 – Usop Nasis ("Abu Asraf"), a listed subleader of Dawlah Islamiyah–ISIS (DI–ISIS) Lanao and the number two man of "Abu Zacaria", dies of injuries following an encounter with joint authorities in Marawi, Lanao del Sur. His wife, as well as eight authorities, is injured.
- April 16 – An encounter with government troops in Patikul, Sulu, ends with an Egyptian terrorist and two Abu Sayyaf members under Mundi Sawadjaan killed.
- April 23 – A series of encounters between the military troops and an Abu Sayyaf (ASG) group under its sub-leader and bombmaker Mundi Sawadjaan in Patikul, Sulu, results to two ASG militants being killed, including the eldest brother of Sawadjaan, who then evades the military dragnet during a clash.
- May 5 – A gunfight occurs when more than 20 gunmen attack soldiers patrolling in Piagapo, Lanao del Sur; one of them, a henchman of the founders of the Maute Group, is killed while three others are wounded.
- May 8 – Datu Paglas market occupation
- June 13 – A shootout ensues at the residence of ASG sub-leader Injam Yadah in Jolo, Sulu, as he is to be arrested by the combined security forces. Yadah, as well as three of his followers including a brother of Mundi Sawadjaan, are killed.
- September 23 - Two BIFF fighters and an Army sergeant were killed in an encounter
- October 29 – DI leader Salahuddin Hassan and his wife are killed in a military raid on a residence in Talayan, Maguindanao.

=== 2022 ===
- January 10 – A group of construction workers are shot in Piagapo, Lanao del Sur with two of them killed. Two suspects, both alleged members of the Dawlah Islamiya–Maute Group (DI-MG), are killed in an encounter in the same town on 5 February.
- February 2 – Two DI–MG members are killed in a clash with government forces on Balabagan, Lanao del Sur.
- February 6 – Joint government forces, foiling a bombing plot, captures two DI–MG members in a pursuit operation in Piagapo, Lanao del Sur.
- March 1 – The joint military and police operation against around 40 DI–MG members is launched in Maguing, Lanao del Sur with at least three suspected terrorists and a soldier killed in an encounter.
- March 25 – Abu Sayyaf Group leader in Basilan, Radzmil Jannatul, is killed during a gunfight between ASG members and a group of Scout Rangers in Sumisip. Jannatul is the successor of Furuji Indama who was killed in late 2020.
- June 1 – A suspected DI member is killed while another is apprehended in an encounter with the military in M'lang, Cotabato.
- November 10 - A clash in Basilan would result in the deaths of Three soldiers and four MILF fighters, and another 13 soldiers were wounded
- December 27 – Two separate gunfights between rival MILF groups occur in Maguindanao del Sur.
  - A pre-dawn encounter begins in Sultan sa Barongis when a group from the 118th Base Command attacks a sitio and fires at the houses of their enemies led by a senior member of the 105th. An ensuing firefight kills two from the former group, including the leader, and the latter's leader's relative.
  - Two armed rival clans fight in Datu Montawal, killing a gunman.

=== 2023 ===
- February 5 – Seven men allegedly linked to the Abu Sayyaf are killed in a pre-dawn encounter with government forces in Parang, Sulu near the boundary with Maimbung. Two companions are arrested; three are wounded.
- February 18 – Three BIFF members, including a field commander of the Karialan faction, are killed in an encounter with government forces in Tacurong, Sultan Kudarat.
- February 20 – An Abu Sayyaf bandit is killed in an encounter with the military troops in Patikul, Sulu.
- March 1 – A member of the BIFF–Karialan Faction is killed in an encounter with the military in Ampatuan, Maguindanao del Sur.
- March 22 – The Philippine Army's 602nd Infantry Brigade launches operations against Dawlah Islamiya (DI) in the Liguasan Marsh, in the border of the provinces of Maguindanao del Sur and Cotabato, following reports in Pagalungan, Datu Montawal, and Pikit of sightings of armed men plotting to launch bombings in two provinces at the start of Ramadan. These start in a pre-dawn attack in Pagalungan against the 30-man DI–Hassan group camping in the border with Datu Montawal, followed by skirmishes; their lairs are pounded. By 27 March, up to seven alleged DI members are killed in the artillery strikes; another is arrested.
- April 17 – A double-decker bus unit is bombed in Isulan, Sultan Kudarat, wounding at least six passengers. The provincial police files charges against nine Bangsamoro Islamic Freedom Fighters members. In May, the military, in their search for the suspects, launches an operation at the suspected DI's lair in Datu Piang, Maguindanao del Sur.
- June 3 – The military, having located in Basilan the harboring position of Dawlah Islamiyah–Abu Sayyaf Group (DI–ASG) subleader in Sulu, Mundi Sawadjaan, in their attempt to apprehend him, rescues an Indonesian teenager identified as the son of the suicide bombers behind the 2019 Jolo Cathedral bombings.
- June 6 – A focused military operation is conducted in Sumisip, Basilan against two DI and ASG subleaders in Sulu and Basilan provinces, wherein their two alleged followers are killed.
- June 14 – "Abu Zacharia", top leader of Islamic State (IS)-linked DI, is killed in a gunfight in Marawi, Lanao del Sur, during a raid on a residence by joint security forces trying to serve an arrest warrant against him. A suspected DI militant is also killed, while a soldier is injured. "Abu Zacharia", whose reported name among others is Faharudin Hadji Satar, is the IS' emir for Southeast Asia who reportedly succeeded Marohombsar ("Abu Dar") as the DI–Maute Group leader in early 2019, and was involved in the 2017 siege of Marawi.
- July 18 – A clash occurs in Datu Paglas, Maguindanao del Sur as security forces is about to serve a search warrant on the lair of a BIFF leader, who is later killed along with six other members.
- September 7 - The Armed Forces of the Philippines declared that the province of Sulu was free from Abu Sayyaf presence
- December 1 – Eleven DI members, including its two ranking leaders, newly declared chief for the Philippines Abdullah Sapal, and Nasser Guinaid Saptullah, who has succeeded Abu Turaifie as the leader of his group in Maguindanao, are killed in an offensive by the army, under Western Mindanao Command, in Datu Hoffer Ampatuan, Maguindanao del Sur.
- December 2:
  - Mudzrimar "Mundi" Sawadjaan, an ASG subleader and bomb maker, is killed by security forces which have intercepted him in a military operation in the waters off Tipo-Tipo and Tuburan in Basilan, during a firefight as he is trying to escape.
  - In the third military operation within two days, a DI-Maute Group sub-leader is killed in a gun battle between five militants and army soldiers in Piagapo, Lanao del Sur. His relative is apprehended following the encounter.
- December 3 – A bomb explosion occurs during a church service in the Mindanao State University gymnasium in Marawi, Lanao del Sur, killing at least four people and injuring 50 others. Islamic State claims responsibility for the attack. On December 6, the military arrests one of the suspects in the bombing.
- December 6 - Twelve Abu Sayyaf members surrendered to the government in Isabela, Basilan
- December 7 – The Army's 6th Infantry Division launches offensives on the suspected lairs of the DI near the Liguasan Marsh, along the Maguindanao del Sur–Cotabato provincial boundaries, after reported sightings of the Hassan sub-group militants in Datu Montawal, Pagalungan, and Pikit. The attack targets their enclaves in the northern parts of the marshland, beginning in Pagalungan, and later near Kabacan and M'lang; two lairs are bombed. Reported casualties among DI members include ten killed and ten wounded.
- December 9–10 - Fighting in Maguindanao killed 9 Dawlah Islamiyah members and 8 MILF members

=== 2024 ===
- 25-26 January – Nine suspected DI–MG members, three of them suspects in the MSU–Marawi bombing, were killed in the military operation in Piagapo, Lanao del Sur. The AFP later announced that Khadafi Mimbesa, the amir (leader) of the DI–MG and an alleged mastermind behind the bombing, was among those killed.
- 11 February – Khatab, a top DI–MG member and another suspect in the MSU bombing, surrendered to the 2nd Mechanized Brigade.
- 22 April - Mohiden Alimodin Animbang, A top commander of the BIFF along with ten other fighters were killed by scout rangers in Maguindanao Del Sur
  - on April 22, Nawapi Abdulsaid, A member of the Abu Sayyaf, who was responsible for at least 15 beheadings and many other atrocities, Is killed by Government troops in Basilan
- Late May – An alleged BIFF member is killed in an encounter with the military in Datu Salibo, Maguindanao del Sur.
- 16 October – Arsani Mimbesa, a key DI–MG member, the last identified suspect in the MSU bombing and listed as the top most wanted person in Lanao del Sur, was arrested in a joint law enforcement operation in Iligan.
- 30 October – Clashes erupt in Pagalungan, Maguindanao del Sur, between two rival MILF groups whose commanders have been contesting ownership of an about 300-hectare rice field. At least 19 people die while five others are injured.
- 17 December – Three members of the Intelligence Service of the Armed Forces of the Philippines (ISAFP) were killed in an ambush in Basilan.

=== 2025 ===
- 9 May – Nasser Daud, a leader of the Dawlah Islamiya-Maute Group (DI-MG) who has been directly linked to the 2023 MSU bombing, is killed in a military encounter in Bacolod-Kalawi, Lanao del Sur.
- 9 August – A clash between government troops and DI-MG fighters occurs in Lumbayanague, Lanao del Sur, during manhunt operations against six suspected members of the latter, subjects of arrest warrants issued by a Regional Trial Court in Marawi in late 2023. Three of them dies in a hospital in Tamparan. A soldier from the Army's 5th Infantry Battalion is injured. The police later identifies one of those killed, as well as the rest who are captured, as minors.
- 9 November – A suspected DI-MG member is killed by a joint task group of the 2nd Mechanized Infantry (Magbalantay) Brigade in an encounter in Salvador, Lanao del Norte, while his two companions escape.
- 14–15 November – Two separate encounters between the 1101st Infantry (Gagandilan) Brigade of the Army's 1st Infantry (Tabak) Division, and DI-MG occur in Pagayawan, Lanao del Sur. Alleged DI-MG leader Najib Laguindab (Abu Jihad), one of the suspects in the 2023 MSU bombing, is killed; while a soldier dies from his injuries. Two individuals are captured.
- 24 November – An armed encounter, involving MILF factions and stemming from a land dispute, erupts in Matalam and Kidapawan in Cotabato, leaving seven men killed including an MILF commander whose family is locked in a rido (clan feud) with another commander.
- 7 December – Ustads Mohammad Usman Solaiman, the "amir" (leader) of the DI-Hassan Group and top bomb expert, is killed in an encounter with the 601st Infantry Brigade in Shariff Aguak, Maguindanao del Sur. His group has been linked to attacks in Mindanao including the bombings in Maguindanao, South Cotabato and Sultan Kudarat in 2022–2023; the ambush of soldiers in Datu Hoffer Ampatuan; and the killing of three goat traders from Batangas in May. Solaiman, nephew of notorious BIFF bomb expert Basit Usman, and Norodin Hassan ("Andot"), the group's amir for military affairs, are reportedly among the last senior lieutenants of Abu Azim, a DI-HG leader killed in 2021.
- 14 December – A member of DI group, who has an arrest warrant issued by a court in Cotabato City, is slain in a clash with government troops in Datu Abdullah Sangki, Maguindanao del Sur. He has been considered one of the main suspects in the killing of five individuals in Rajah Buayan since 2024, including a school principal in early June 2025.
- 17 December – The AFP announces in a press briefing in Camp Aguinaldo the decrease of number of members of local terrorist groups (LTGs) in the country, mostly based in Mindanao and including the Abu Sayyaf, from 1,257 in 2016 to just about 50; and the neutralization of 28 "high value individuals", including 10 "amirs" or LTG group leaders, in series of operations since 2016.

=== 2026 ===
- January 23 – Four soldiers are killed while another is injured in an ambush, allegedly by the DI-MG, in Munai, Lanao del Norte.
- January 27 – Two army soldiers are killed in a military operation against the DI–Hassan Group (DI-HG) in Datu Hoffer Ampatuan, Maguindanao del Sur.
- March 8 – Emarudin Kulaw, sub-leader and former emir of the DI-HG, is killed in a brief encounter between the combined personnel from the 601st and 602nd Infantry Brigades and his group at his hideout in Banisilan, Cotabato; his four companions later flee. Kulaw had been wanted for more than 20 high-profile criminal cases in Cotabato, Maguindanao del Norte and Maguindanao del Sur.
- March 28 – A patrol car of the Maguindanao del Sur provincial police is ambushed by the suspected DI in Shariff Aguak while returning to their headquarters at Camp Datu Akilan, killing five officers and injuring three others.
- April 17 – A pre-dawn joint police-military operation is held in Marantao, Lanao del Sur, where remnants of the DI-MG opens fire on the government forces that attempting to arrest their leader. Ten from the former are killed. The group is involved in 2017 Marawi siege; as its members are likewise implicated in a deadly ambush in Lanao del Norte in January.
- April 19 – Esmail Abdulmalik ("Abu Turaife"), former leader of the DI–Abu Turaife Group who, along with his men, surrendered to the military in 2025, dies of cardiac arrest as unidentified men open fire at his residence in Shariff Saydona Mustapha, Maguindanao del Sur. None in his immediate family is hurt in the strafing.
- May 30 – A suspected DI-HG member is killed while two others are arrested as army troops encounter an estimated seven terrorists and overrun their temporary camp in Datu Hoffer Ampatuan, Maguindanao del Sur.
- July 7 – DI terrorists kill two patrolmen, on their way to a company command post, in an ambush in Lambayong, Sultan Kudarat.
- July 8–9 – Two joint law enforcement operations occur in a village in Banisilan, Cotabato. Three members of a criminal gang identified with the DI are killed in the first clash where Medalya Sultan Tidong, the long-wanted gang leader, and six of his remaining companions escape. The following day, another member, Tidong's relative, is killed in another clash.
- August 6 – A joint law enforcement operation in Pikit, Cotabato, which involves an attempt to serve arrest warrants, results in the deaths of five DI-HG members, three of them are Bangsamoro's top three most wanted individuals including Marhum Esmael, the alleged leader of the group and the region's top most wanted. The five, having been wanted for various criminal charges in Cotabato City, Cotabato, Maguindanao del Sur, and Sultan Kudarat, are involved in a deadly ambush in Maguindanao del Sur in March.
- September 19 – A coordinated law enforcement operation is conducted in Tugunan, Special Geographic Area of the Bangsamoro, to serve an arrest warrant against members of an armed Moro group. Seven from the latter are later killed.
- October 16 – Joint law enforcement operatives overrun an alleged hideout of DI-HG leader Yusa Ganoy in Sultan Mastura, Maguindanao del Norte. Ganoy, the subject of the operation who has facing multiple criminal charges, and three followers are slain in a clash.
- November 8 – Police kills DI member Amar Sansawi Usman, one of the suspects in the Shariff Aguak ambush in March and the Bangsamoro's most wanted fugitive, and his companion in a gunfight during an attempt to arrest him in Ampatuan, Maguindanao del Sur.
