= Battle of Danag =

2020 ambush of the Moro conflict

- Part of Moro conflict
Date	April 17, 2020
Location	Danag, Patikul, Sulu, Philippines

Belligerents
Philippines: 21st Infantry Battalion	Abu Sayyaf

Commanders and leaders
Cirilito Sobejana; 1st Lt. Rogelio Deligero Jr. †	Radullan Sahiron; Hajan Sawadjaan

Strength
Unknown	40

Casualties and losses
12 killed (3 hacked); 14 wounded	Unknown

On April 17, 2020, militants from Abu Sayyaf ambushed Philippine forces in the jungles near the village of Danag, Patikul, Sulu, Philippines. Twelve Philippine soldiers were killed, and fourteen were injured.

== Background ==
Abu Sayyaf is a Filipino jihadist militia and an affiliate of the Islamic State based in Muslim-majority areas in the southern Philippines, including the island of Sulu. Prior to the attack, Abu Sayyaf attacked Philippine forces on March 15 in Basilan, killing one and injuring two others.

== Battle ==
At the time of the attack, the 21st Infantry Battalion of the Philippine Army had been preparing for an assault against Abu Sayyaf militants in the jungly mountains near the village of Danag when they came upon a group of forty militants. The encounter occurred at 3:05pm at Sitio Lubong, and clashes broke out immediately between the militants and the soldiers. A military report confirmed that Abu Sayyaf leader Radullan Sahiron and Hajan Sawadjaan were among those present in the militant's group. The fighting lasted for an hour, and the Abu Sayyaf militants withdrew.

== Aftermath ==
Blood at the scene confirmed the deaths and injuries of an unknown number of militants, according to Lieutenant General Cirilito Sobejana. Eleven Philippine soldiers were initially killed, and fourteen were injured. One soldier died of his injuries shortly after the battle, raising the toll to twelve killed. Philippine forces lost several weapons.

The Philippine Army dispatched reinforcements from the 11th Infantry Division, 5th Scout Ranger Battalion, 6th Special Forces Battalion, and 32nd Infantry Battalion to the site, and the army began combing operations around the site of the battle. The Philippine government announced that the flag would be flown at half-mast in response, and Chief of Staff Felimon Santos Jr. hailed the fallen soldiers as heroes.

It was also the deadliest battle the Philippine Army fought in a while according to the Philippine Army
