= Hadji Panglima Tahil =

Municipality in Sulu, Philippines

Hadji Panglima Tahil هَجِّ فَڠْلِمَ تَهِلْ Marungas
- Municipality
- Municipality of Hadji Panglima Tahil
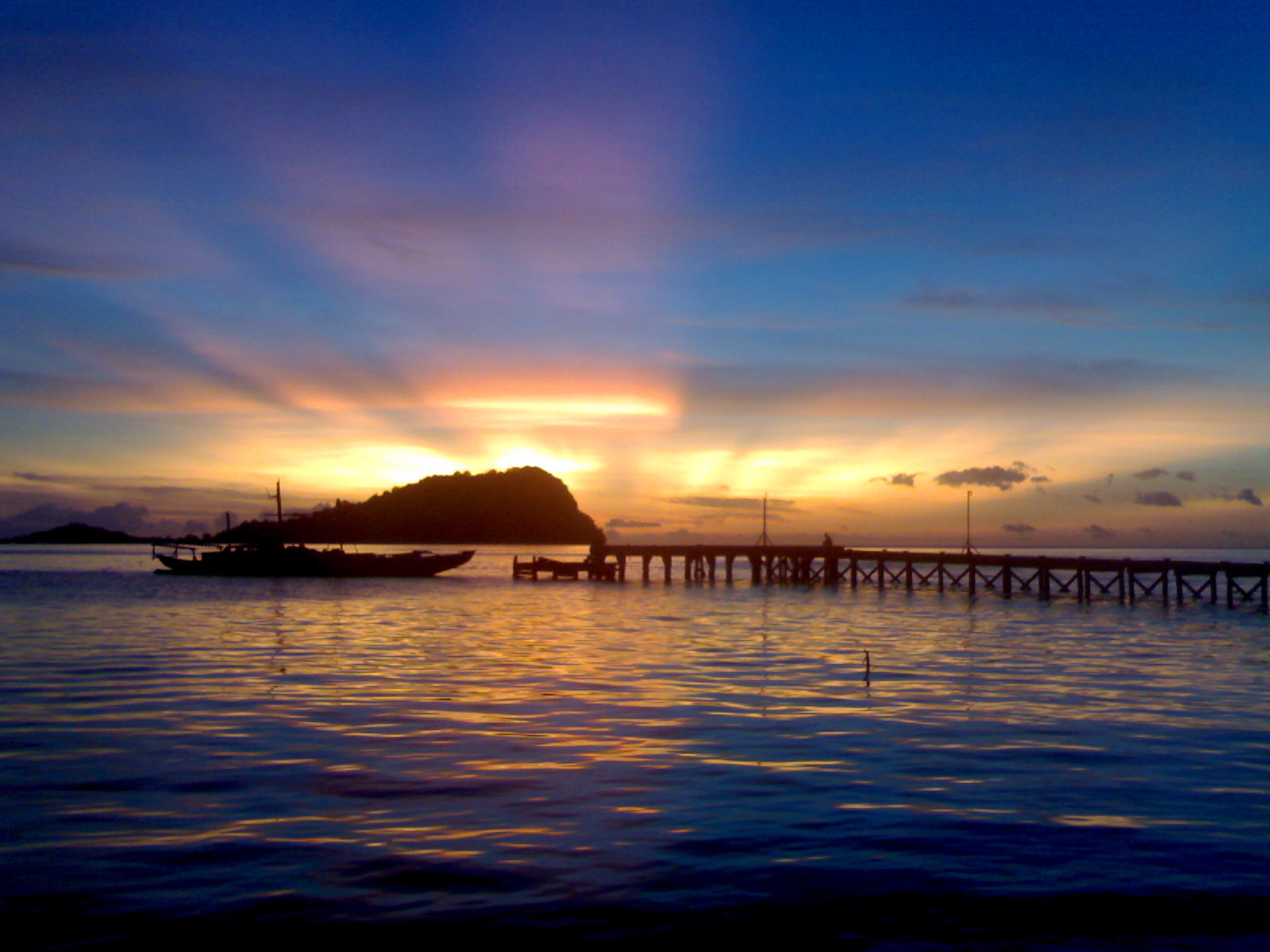

- Seal

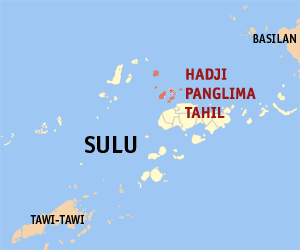
- Map of Sulu with Hadji Panglima Tahil highlighted
- Interactive map of Hadji Panglima Tahil
- Location within the Philippines
- Coordinates: 6°10′N 120°55′E
- Country: Philippines
- Region: Zamboanga Peninsula
- Province: Sulu
- District: 1st district
- Barangays: 5 (see Barangays)

Government
  - Type: Sangguniang Bayan
  - Mayor: Moh. Mustafa S. Burahan
  - Vice Mayor: Galib K. Datan
  - Representative: Samier A. Tan
  - Municipal Council: Members: Chazrave B. Hadjulani; Ridzmal S. Jiloh; Hajija A. Masarik; Saura M. Hadjirul; Nafiza M. Abidin; Mussah U. Abdulhamid; Romy J. Anni; Mustapha Raiwin S. Masihul
  - Electorate: 5,083 voters (2025)

Area
  - Total: 67.90 km^{2} (26.22 sq mi)
- Elevation: 14 m (46 ft)
- Highest elevation: 788 m (2,585 ft)
- Lowest elevation: 0 m (0 ft)

Population (2024 census)
  - Total: 8,441
  - Density: 124.3/km^{2} (322.0/sq mi)
  - Households: 1,372

Economy
  - Income class: 5th municipal income class
  - Poverty incidence: 26.46% (2023)
  - Revenue: ₱ 88.49 million (2022)
  - Assets: ₱ 263.3 million (2022)
  - Expenditure: ₱ 66.03 million (2022)
  - Liabilities: ₱ 201.5 million (2022)

Service provider
  - Electricity: Sulu Electric Cooperative (SULECO)
- Time zone: UTC+8 (PST)
- ZIP code: 7413
- PSGC: 1906606000
- IDD : area code: +63 (0)68
- Native languages: Tausug; Tagalog
- Website: www.hadjipanglimatahil.gov.ph

Hadji Panglima Tahil, officially the Municipality of Hadji Panglima Tahil (Tausūg: Kawman sin Hadji Panglima Tahil; Filipino: Bayan ng Hadji Panglima Tahil), is a municipality in the province of Sulu, Philippines. According to the 2024 census, it has a population of 8,441 people, making it the least populated municipality in the province.

It is formerly known as Marunggas. In 2000, it was the poorest municipality in the Philippines with a poverty incidence estimate of 89.7%.

== Geography ==
=== Barangays ===
Hadji Panglima Tahil is politically subdivided into 5 barangays. Each barangay consists of puroks while some have sitios.

- Bangas (Poblacion)
- Bubuan
- Kabuukan
- Pag-asinan
- Teomabal

=== Climate ===
Climate data for Hadji Panglima Tahil, Sulu
Month	Jan	Feb	Mar	Apr	May	Jun	Jul	Aug	Sep	Oct	Nov	Dec	Year
Mean daily maximum °C (°F)	27 (81)	27 (81)	27 (81)	28 (82)	29 (84)	29 (84)	28 (82)	28 (82)	28 (82)	28 (82)	28 (82)	28 (82)	28 (82)
Mean daily minimum °C (°F)	27 (81)	26 (79)	27 (81)	27 (81)	28 (82)	28 (82)	28 (82)	28 (82)	28 (82)	28 (82)	28 (82)	27 (81)	28 (81)
Average precipitation mm (inches)	170 (6.7)	130 (5.1)	125 (4.9)	122 (4.8)	229 (9.0)	286 (11.3)	254 (10.0)	248 (9.8)	182 (7.2)	257 (10.1)	233 (9.2)	188 (7.4)	2,424 (95.5)
Average rainy days	18.3	15.3	15.2	14.6	22.8	24.0	24.3	23.3	20.5	22.6	21.9	19.3	242.1
Source: Meteoblue (modeled/calculated data, not measured locally)

== Demographics ==
Population census of Hadji Panglima Tahil
Year	Pop.	±% p.a.
1903	267	—
1918	4,296	+20.35%
1939	1,998	−3.58%
1948	1,850	−0.85%
1960	671	−8.10%
1970	1,341	+7.16%
1975	4,178	+25.60%
1980	4,325	+0.69%
1990	4,153	−0.41%
1995	4,419	+1.17%
2000	5,314	+4.03%
2007	6,192	+2.13%
2010	5,850	−2.05%
2015	6,375	+1.65%
2020	7,906	+4.63%
2024	8,441	+1.58%
Source: Philippine Statistics Authority

== Economy ==
Poverty Incidence of Hadji Panglima Tahil

Source: Philippine Statistics Authority
