= Sulu's 1st congressional district =

Legislative district of the Philippines

- Constituency for the House of Representatives of the Philippines
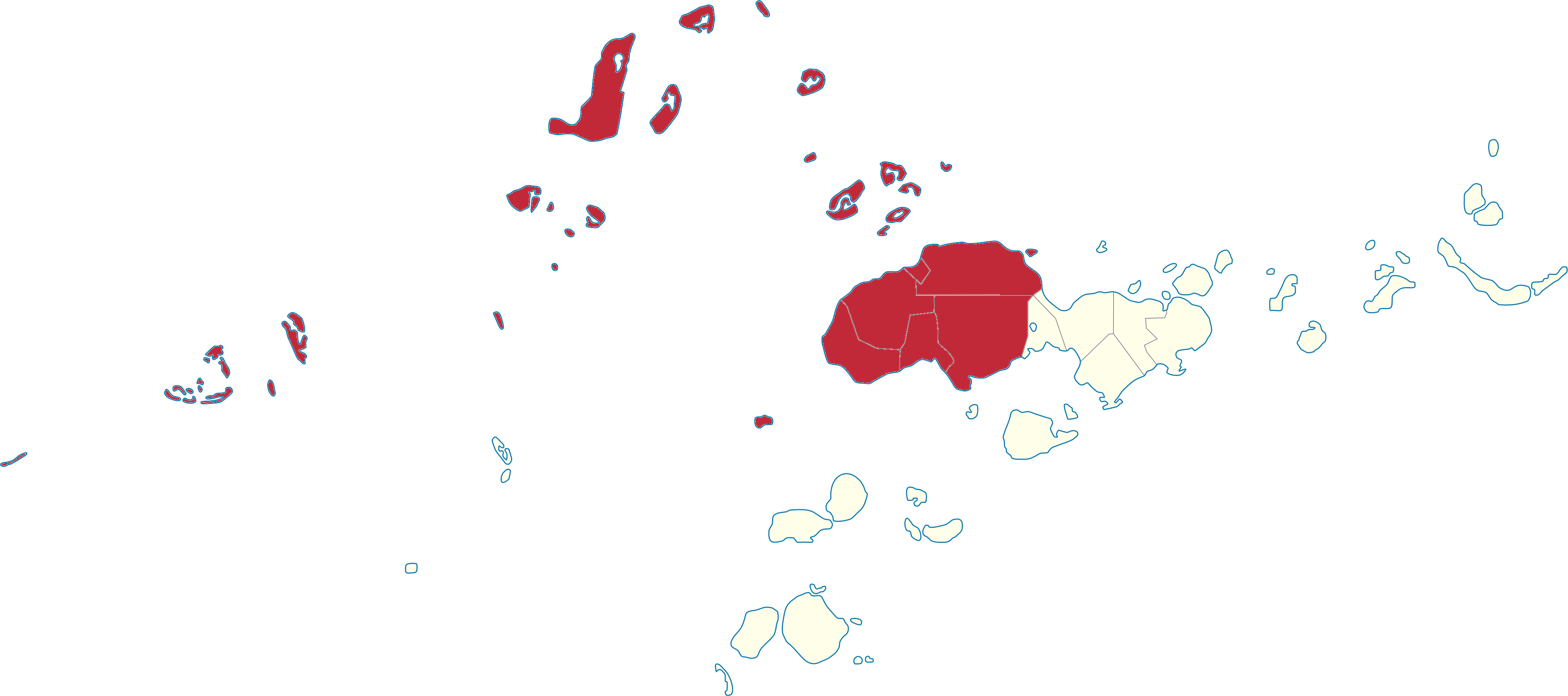
- Boundary of Sulu's 1st congressional district in Sulu

- Location of Sulu within the Philippines
- Province: Sulu
- Region: Zamboanga Peninsula
- Population: 486,063 (2015)
- Electorate: 246,813 (2022)
- Major settlements: 8 LGUs: Municipalities; Hadji Panglima Tahil; Indanan; Jolo; Maimbung; Pangutaran; Parang; Patikul; Talipao
- Area: 1,101.53 km^{2} (425.30 sq mi)

Current constituency
- Created: 1987
- Representative: Samier A. Tan
- Political party: Lakas–CMD
- Congressional bloc: Majority

Sulu's 1st congressional district is a congressional district in the province of Sulu. It has been represented in the House of Representatives of the Philippines since 1987. The district encompasses the western half of Jolo island composed of six municipalities that include its namesake town, the capital of Sulu, as well as the northern outlying islands of the Marungas (Hadji Panglima Tahil) and Pangutaran. It is currently represented in the 20th Congress by Samier A. Tan of the Lakas–CMD.

== Representation history ==
#	Image	Member	Term of office		Congress	Party	Electoral history	Constituent LGUs
#	Image	Member	Start	End	Congress	Party	Electoral history	Constituent LGUs
=== Sulu's 1st district for the House of Representatives of the Philippines ===
District created February 2, 1987 from Sulu's at-large district.
1		Abdusakur Mahail Tan	December 3, 1987	June 30, 1992	8th	Liberal	Elected in 1987.	1987–1998; Indanan, Jolo, Maimbung, Marungas, Pangutaran, Parang, Patikul, Talipao
2		Bensaudi O. Tulawie	June 30, 1992	June 30, 1998	9th	Lakas	Elected in 1992.	1987–1998; Indanan, Jolo, Maimbung, Marungas, Pangutaran, Parang, Patikul, Talipao
2		Bensaudi O. Tulawie	June 30, 1992	June 30, 1998	10th	Lakas	Re-elected in 1995.	1987–1998; Indanan, Jolo, Maimbung, Marungas, Pangutaran, Parang, Patikul, Talipao
3		Hussin Ututalum Amin	June 30, 1998	June 30, 2007	11th	LAMMP	Elected in 1998.	1998–present Hadji Panglima Tahil, Indanan, Jolo, Maimbung, Pangutaran, Parang, Patikul, Talipao
3		Hussin Ututalum Amin	June 30, 1998	June 30, 2007	12th	Lakas	Re-elected in 2001.	1998–present Hadji Panglima Tahil, Indanan, Jolo, Maimbung, Pangutaran, Parang, Patikul, Talipao
3		Hussin Ututalum Amin	June 30, 1998	June 30, 2007	13th	Lakas	Re-elected in 2004.	1998–present Hadji Panglima Tahil, Indanan, Jolo, Maimbung, Pangutaran, Parang, Patikul, Talipao
4		Yusop Jikiri	June 30, 2007	June 30, 2010	14th	NPC	Elected in 2007.	1998–present Hadji Panglima Tahil, Indanan, Jolo, Maimbung, Pangutaran, Parang, Patikul, Talipao
5		Tupay Loong	June 30, 2010	June 30, 2016	15th	NUP	Elected in 2010.	1998–present Hadji Panglima Tahil, Indanan, Jolo, Maimbung, Pangutaran, Parang, Patikul, Talipao
5		Tupay Loong	June 30, 2010	June 30, 2016	16th	NUP	Re-elected in 2013.	1998–present Hadji Panglima Tahil, Indanan, Jolo, Maimbung, Pangutaran, Parang, Patikul, Talipao
5		Tupay Loong	June 30, 2010	June 30, 2016	16th	NUP	Re-elected in 2016. Died before start of term.	1998–present Hadji Panglima Tahil, Indanan, Jolo, Maimbung, Pangutaran, Parang, Patikul, Talipao
—	vacant		June 30, 2016	June 30, 2019	17th	–	No special election held to fill vacancy.	1998–present Hadji Panglima Tahil, Indanan, Jolo, Maimbung, Pangutaran, Parang, Patikul, Talipao
6		Samier A. Tan	June 30, 2019	Incumbent	18th	PDP–Laban	Elected in 2019.	1998–present Hadji Panglima Tahil, Indanan, Jolo, Maimbung, Pangutaran, Parang, Patikul, Talipao
6		Samier A. Tan	June 30, 2019	Incumbent	19th	Lakas	Re-elected in 2022.	1998–present Hadji Panglima Tahil, Indanan, Jolo, Maimbung, Pangutaran, Parang, Patikul, Talipao
6		Samier A. Tan	June 30, 2019	Incumbent	20th	Lakas	Re-elected in 2025.	1998–present Hadji Panglima Tahil, Indanan, Jolo, Maimbung, Pangutaran, Parang, Patikul, Talipao

== Election results ==
=== 2025 ===
Candidate	Party	Votes	%
Samier Tan (incumbent)	Lakas–CMD	204,178	98.29
Bensaudi Tulawie	Independent	2,520	1.21
Mhar Mudjilon	Independent	1,033	0.50
Total		207,731	100.00
Valid votes		207,731	93.13
Invalid/blank votes		15,330	6.87
Total votes		223,061	100.00
Registered voters/turnout		262,367	85.02
Lakas–CMD hold			
Source: Commission on Elections

=== 2022 ===
Candidate	Party	Votes	%
Samier Tan (incumbent)	PDP–Laban	186,240	100.00
Total		186,240	100.00
Total votes		206,681	–
Registered voters/turnout		246,813	83.74
PDP–Laban hold			
Source: Commission on Elections

=== 2019 ===
2019 Philippine House of Representatives elections
Party	Candidate	Votes	%
PDP–Laban	Samier Tan	83,670	
Lakas	Yusop Jikiri	65,928	
Total votes			
PDP–Laban hold			

== See also ==
- Legislative districts of Sulu
