= 2011 Al-Barka clash =

Armed incident in the Moro conflict

Coordinates: 6°29′51″N 122°7′7″E

- Part of Moro conflict
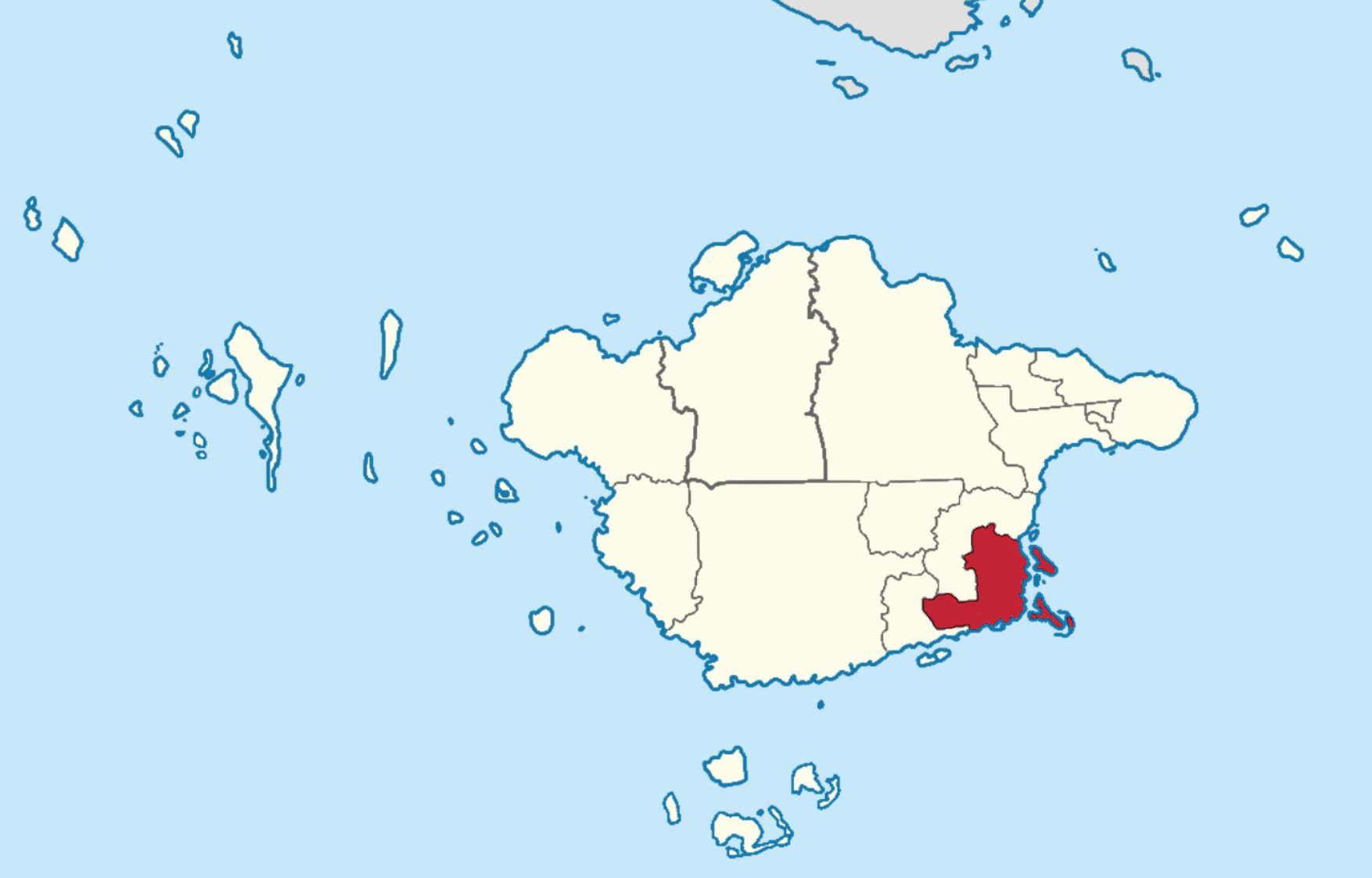
- A map of Al-Barka, Basilan.
Date	October 18, 2011
Location	Al-Barka, Basilan, Philippines
Result	MILF-Abu Sayyaf victory: Philippine Army suffers heavy casualties

Belligerents
Philippines: Armed Forces of the Philippines	Moro Islamic Liberation Front * (114th Base Command); Abu Sayyaf

Commanders and leaders
(Philippines) Alexander Macario; 1st Lt. Rovel Bragais †; 1st Lt. Ramil Dela Cruz †; 2nd Lt. Michael Casiño †; 2nd Lt. Alvin Sabeniano †	Dan Laksaw Asnawi; Nur Hassan Jamri; Long Malat

Strength
40-60	unknown

Casualties and losses
19-25 killed 12-15 injured 2-8 captured (6 executed)	6 killed (MILF claim)

The 2011 Al-Barka clash, also known as the Al-Barka incident or Al-Barka massacre, was a deadly armed encounter between units of the Philippine Army and fighters of the Moro Islamic Liberation Front (MILF) on 18 October 2011 in Al-Barka, Basilan, in the southern Philippines. The fighting resulted in the deaths of 19 to 25 soldiers and several MILF fighters, and was one of the bloodiest clashes between government forces and the MILF during the administration of President Benigno Aquino III. The incident was marked as one of the Philippine Army's worst operational blunders in recent history. The attacking force was composed of mostly trainees of the elite Special Forces regiment based in Fort Magsaysay, Nueva Ecija.

== Background ==
On 18 October 2011, elements of the 19th Special Forces Company of the Philippine Army were operating in a remote area of Al-Barka when they were engaged by armed MILF fighters. Reports indicate that approximately 40–60soldiers were involved in the operation. The encounter escalated into a sustained firefight in difficult jungle terrain.

== Clash ==
The clash occurred amid ongoing but fragile peace negotiations between the Philippine government and the MILF, aimed at resolving the long-running Moro conflict in Mindanao. Although a ceasefire mechanism was formally in place, tensions persisted on the ground, particularly in Basilan, where government forces were conducting operations against the Abu Sayyaf Group.

In mid-October 2011, Philippine Army Special Forces units were deployed to Al-Barka reportedly to pursue suspected militants. The MILF, however, claimed that government troops entered the territory under its control without proper coordination

The clash lasted for nine hours, from 7 a.m to 4 p.m, 19–25 soldiers were killed in the fighting, including 4 junior officers and numerous others were wounded. The MILF also reported casualties on its side, with varying figures cited in media reports

The gunmen were led by Dan Laksaw Asnawi, said to be a deputy commander of the MILF's Bangsamoro Islamic Armed Forces’ “114th Base Command,” who is wanted for killing and beheading 14 Marines in Al-Barka in 2007.

The six that were reported captured by the group of Abu Sayyaf leader Long Malat after being disarmed and turned over to the MILF were murdered whose bodies were recovered.

== Aftermath ==
The incident prompted national controversy and political repercussions. The Armed Forces of the Philippines launched investigations into the conduct of the operation, including questions over command responsibility and coordination with ceasefire mechanisms. Several military officials were scrutinized. Col. Amikandra Undug, one of the military officials charged for the October 2011 bungled operation in Al-Barka town in Basilan that resulted in the deaths of the soldiers, has been found guilty by the general court martial that handled the case.

Despite the severity of the fighting, both the Philippine government and the MILF leadership reaffirmed their commitment to the peace process. The International Monitoring Team (IMT), which oversaw aspects of the ceasefire, was asked to review the circumstances of the encounter.

1,586 families, or 7,888 people were affected or displaced as a result of the encounter between the Moro Islamic Liberation Front and the Armed Forces of the Philippines in Al-Barka.
