= Indanan =

Municipality in Sulu, Philippines

Indanan اِنْدَنَنْ
- Municipality
- Municipality of Indanan
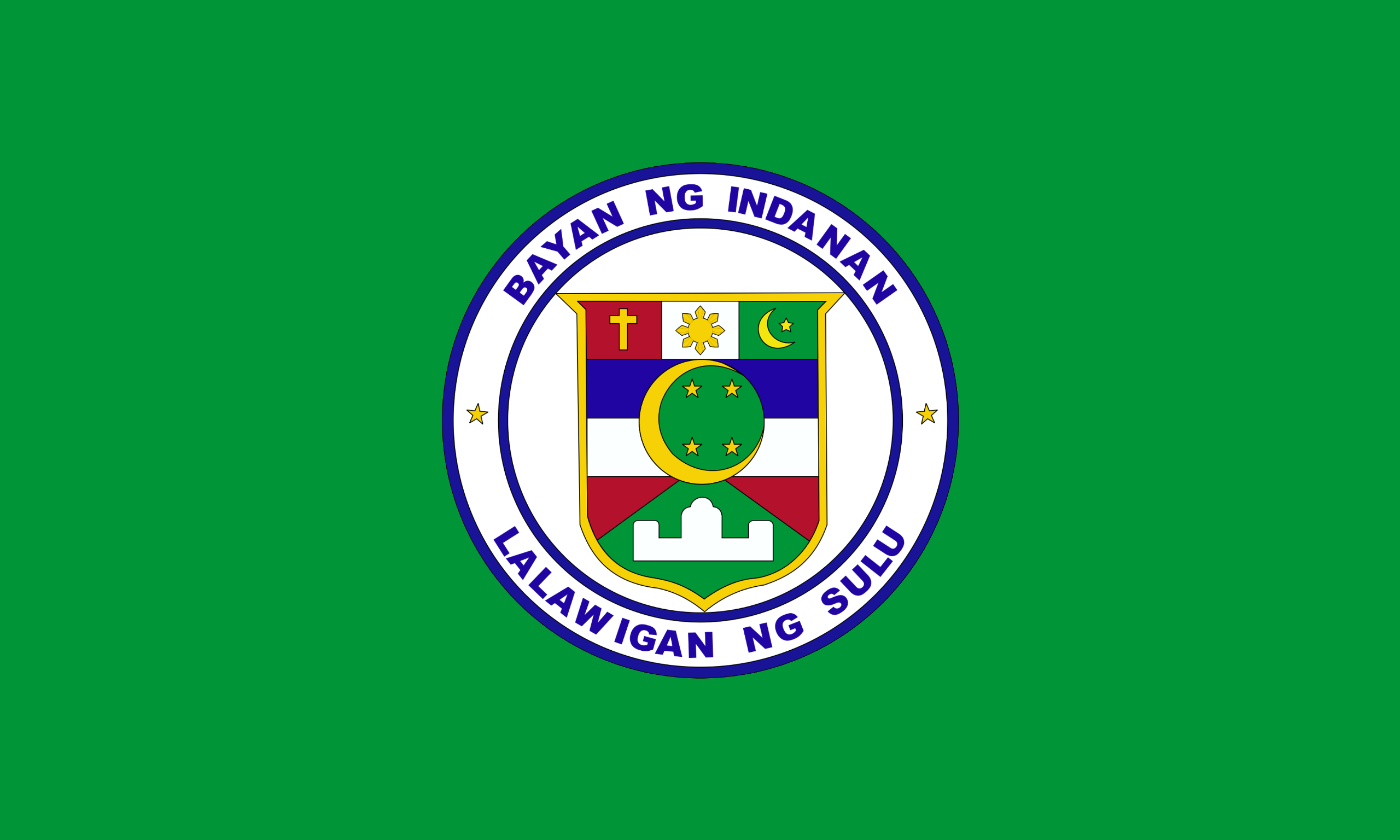
- Flag Seal

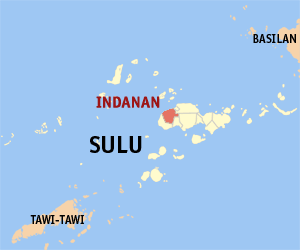
- Map of Sulu with Indanan highlighted
- Interactive map of Indanan
- Location within the Philippines
- Coordinates: 6°00′N 120°58′E
- Country: Philippines
- Region: Zamboanga Peninsula
- Province: Sulu
- District: 1st district
- Barangays: 34 (see Barangays)

Government
  - Type: Sangguniang Bayan
  - Mayor: Hermot D. Jikiri
  - Vice Mayor: Allan-Nahier S. Jainal
  - Representative: Samier A. Tan
  - Municipal Council: Members: Alano A. Palahuddin; Al-Nazib U. Hamsail; Abdulmier M. Muksan; Darwin T. Askali; Abdel Jabbar M. Ibrahim; Rommel Q. Indanan; Salip Abdul-rhadam H. Haiver; Franco Wel B. Asiri
  - Electorate: 32,735 voters (2025)

Area
  - Total: 170.72 km^{2} (65.92 sq mi)
- Elevation: 202 m (663 ft)
- Highest elevation: 798 m (2,618 ft)
- Lowest elevation: 0 m (0 ft)

Population (2024 census)
  - Total: 105,384
  - Density: 617.29/km^{2} (1,598.8/sq mi)
  - Households: 15,839

Economy
  - Income class: 1st municipal income class
  - Poverty incidence: 19.96% (2023)
  - Revenue: ₱ 319.6 million (2022)
  - Assets: ₱ 447 million (2022)
  - Expenditure: ₱ 224.6 million (2022)
  - Liabilities: ₱ 115.9 million (2022)

Service provider
  - Electricity: Sulu Electric Cooperative (SULECO)
- Time zone: UTC+8 (PST)
- ZIP code: 7407
- PSGC: 1906601000
- IDD : area code: +63 (0)68
- Native languages: Tausug; Tagalog
- Website: www.indanan.gov.ph

Indanan, officially the Municipality of Indanan (Tausūg: Kawman sin Indanan; Filipino: Bayan ng Indanan), is a municipality in the province of Sulu, Philippines. According to the 2024 census, it has a population of 105,384 people.

== Geography ==
=== Barangays ===
Indanan is politically subdivided into 34 barangays. Each barangay consists of puroks while some have sitios.

- Adjid
- Bangalan
- Bato-bato
- Buanza
- Bud-Taran
- Bunut
- Jati-Tunggal
- Kabbon Maas
- Kagay
- Kajatian
- Kan Islam
- Kandang Tukay
- Karawan
- Katian
- Kuppong
- Lambayong
- Langpas
- Licup
- Malimbaya
- Manggis
- Manilop
- Paligue
- Panabuan
- Panglima Misuari (Sasak)
- Pasil
- Poblacion (Indanan)
- Sapah Malaum
- Sawaki
- Sionogan
- Tagbak
- Timbangan
- Tubig Dakulah
- Tubig Parang
- Tumantangis

=== Climate ===
Climate data for Indanan, Sulu
Month	Jan	Feb	Mar	Apr	May	Jun	Jul	Aug	Sep	Oct	Nov	Dec	Year
Mean daily maximum °C (°F)	26 (79)	25 (77)	26 (79)	27 (81)	27 (81)	27 (81)	27 (81)	27 (81)	27 (81)	27 (81)	27 (81)	27 (81)	27 (80)
Mean daily minimum °C (°F)	26 (79)	25 (77)	26 (79)	26 (79)	27 (81)	27 (81)	27 (81)	27 (81)	27 (81)	27 (81)	26 (79)	26 (79)	26 (80)
Average precipitation mm (inches)	170 (6.7)	130 (5.1)	125 (4.9)	122 (4.8)	229 (9.0)	286 (11.3)	254 (10.0)	248 (9.8)	182 (7.2)	257 (10.1)	233 (9.2)	188 (7.4)	2,424 (95.5)
Average rainy days	18.3	15.3	15.2	14.6	22.8	24.0	24.3	23.3	20.5	22.6	21.9	19.3	242.1
Source: Meteoblue (modeled/calculated data, not measured locally)

== Demographics ==
Population census of Indanan
Year	Pop.	±% p.a.
1918	7,076	—
1939	18,959	+4.81%
1948	17,722	−0.75%
1960	23,381	+2.34%
1970	26,380	+1.21%
1975	6,234	−25.12%
1980	32,074	+38.75%
1990	41,969	+2.73%
1995	46,140	+1.79%
2000	53,425	+3.19%
2007	85,220	+6.65%
2010	65,858	−8.95%
2015	80,883	+3.99%
2020	93,168	+3.02%
2024	105,384	+3.00%
Source: Philippine Statistics Authority

== Economy ==
Poverty Incidence of Indanan

Source: Philippine Statistics Authority
