= Tupay Loong =

Filipino politician

- تُفَيْ لُؤُڠْ

Governor of Sulu
- In office 1984–1996

Member of the Philippine House of Representatives from Sulu's First District
- In office 30 June 2010 – 30 June 2016
- Preceded by: Yusop Jikri
- Succeeded by: Samier Tan

Personal details
- Born: Hadji Tupay Loong c. 1947 Parang, Sulu, Philippines
- Died: 30 June 2016 (aged 68–69) Quezon City, Philippines
- Spouse: Hadja Sitti Rasidam Loong

Habib Tupay T. Loong (1947 – 30 June 2016) was a Filipino politician who was a representative of Sulu's 1st congressional district in the Autonomous Region in Muslim Mindanao (ARMM). He is the older brother of Ben Tupay Loong, the current vice-governor, and himself served as Governor of Sulu for three terms (from 1984–88, 1988–92, 1992–96). Together the "Loong Brothers" constitute a formidable political force in Sulu.

== Background ==
Loong is a native of Parang, Sulu. He became one of the founders of the Moro National Liberation Front (MNLF), rising to the rank of commander, but quit in 1974 along with seven other leaders to join the government. He was married to Hadja Sitti Rasidam Loong.

Loong died on 30 June 2016 at the St. Luke's Medical Center, Quezon City due to liver cancer. He was aged 69.

== Political Activity ==
Loong made his start as a powerful former MNLF commander turned political player who as a candidate gained the support of the ruling coalition under then-President Corazon Aquino. He long maintained a private army despite government efforts to demilitarise Sulu politics, and the supporters of Loong and his rival Indanan Anni exchanging gunfire and attacks during the 1988 election for governor.

Tupay's current Chief of Staff is Sigfredo A. Plaza.

=== Negotiations with Terrorists and Kidnappers ===
As Governor, Loong frequently acted as intermediary and negotiator when foreigners were taken hostage by kidnappers and terrorist groups. In 1984, Loong assisted the United States and the Government of the Philippines in their efforts to free American John Ravinow and friend Helmut Herbst, who were held by bandits in a forested area of Jolo Island. In 1988 he also conducted negotiations with rebels holding a Japanese amateur photographer, Shigehiro Ishikawa, and in 1992 for the release of two Americans (Carol Allen and Tracy Rectanus) and two Australians (Lynette Cook and her daughter, Cheree).

=== Shooting During 1992 Elections ===
Philippine marines shot dead three of Loong's bodyguards when he tried to force his way into a polling station during the 1992 elections. Election law prohibits candidates or their supporters from entering polling stations while voting or counting is taking place. However, Loong was successfully re-elected for a third term.

=== 1996 Elections ===
Loong lost the 1996 election for governorship to Sakur Tan, supposedly when Munir Arbison shifted his support to Tan.

=== Advisor to the President ===
Loong supported Yusop Jikiri in his 2001 gubernatorial bid, but in 2003 attempted to displace him in a hotly contested pre-election dispute within their party.

In mid-2004 Loong was named presidential assistant for Muslim Communities, and was key in securing Muslim support for President Arroyo's 10-point agenda. Shortly thereafter, in November 2004, he was appointed the Undersecretary for External Affairs. The Office of External Affairs was set up primarily to "liaison with constituency groups and build grassroots support for the administrations agenda and legislation," according to the Executive Order that created the office. In September 2006 Loong again took the post of presidential assistant for Muslim Communities.

== Return to Local Politics ==
In late 2009 Loong competed for the 1st District representative slot as a candidate of Lakas Kampi CMD and won, returning to local politics. As representative he has urged the government to refocus its efforts to address the decades-old rebellion in Mindanao. He stressed that "the Philippine government needs to become fairer economically, more accountable politically, more responsible socially, more sensitive culturally, and provides equal opportunity to all -- they be Lumad, Bangsamoro or Christian. Ultimately, this will facilitate resolving the Mindanao conflict not only by structurally addressing its root causes through the peace negotiations, but also by healing the deep social, cultural and religious gaps or misunderstandings."

=== Current Committee Memberships ===
Rep. Loong is a member of the following committees.

- MUSLIM AFFAIRS, Chairperson (Journal #7)
- AGRARIAN REFORM, Member for the Majority (Journal #4)
- APPROPRIATIONS, Member for the Majority (Journal #13)
- AQUACULTURE AND FISHERIES RESOURCES, Member for the Majority (Journal #5)
- LOCAL GOVERNMENT, Member for the Majority (Journal #7)
- MINDANAO AFFAIRS, Member for the Majority (Journal #11)
- NATIONAL DEFENSE AND SECURITY, Member for the Majority (Journal #8)
- PEACE, RECONCILIATION AND UNITY, Member for the Majority (Journal #13)
- PUBLIC ORDER AND SAFETY, Member for the Majority (Journal #7)
- SOCIAL SERVICES, Member for the Majority (Journal #7)

=== Peace and Reconciliation Efforts ===
Rep. Loong in August 2010 gave a speech in Congress urging both sides to "silence their guns" in the name of peace and development for Mindanao, and in September 2010 asked the national government to consider the formation of a national peace and reconciliation commission to formulate attractions to encourage rebels to surrender and return to the law. Loong encouraged all line agencies in both the national government and the ARMM to prepare a comprehensive rehabilitation and development plan that will deliver basic services in conflict-affected areas in Mindanao. He also emphasized that the national government should appropriate substantial budgetary requirement to fast-track all development efforts, especially those in conflict-affected areas.

Loong appealed to leaders of the Bangsamoro rebel forces to "silence their guns" in exchange for meaningful autonomy: "I would like to call the Muslim leaders of the different Bangsamoro rebels to exercise their utmost sense of statesmanship as they endeavor to work for the collective interest of the Bangsamoro people," he said.

=== Inquiry into U.S. Oil Drilling ===
Rep. Loong in August 2010 denounced the oil drilling explorations being made in the South Sulu Sea by the ExxonMobil Exploration and Production Philippines BV (the Philippine arm of Exxon), saying that they were made without the consent of the province's local government. He asked the House Committee on Energy (CoE) to conduct an inquiry into the drilling that started in late 2009. (Mitra Energy Ltd. and BHB Billiton International Exploration Pty. Ltd. own a 25% stake in the contract, ExxonMobil owns 50%.) Loong said there is a need for the CoE to scrutinise Service Contract No. 56 (SC-56) entered into by the Department of Energy (DoE) and the ExxonMobil in order to protect and preserve the rich biodiversity and the economic growth and general welfare of the people of Sulu. "(Service Contract) SC-56 should be scrutinised to make sure contingency plans are in place during the drilling and its impact on our ecology and the cost of possible destruction of our biodiversity vis-à-vis its real contribution to the economic growth and general welfare of the country, especially to the people of Sulu," the resolution of Loong stated. Loong emphasised in his resolution, that any contract entered into by the national government and ExxonMobil is also the primary concern of the people of Sulu.

=== Support and Criticism for ARMM ===
In September 2010 Loong responded to the news that Governor Abdusakur Mahail Tan had sent a letter to President Aquino saying that the ARMM had failed its people and should be abolished. Loong stated that the ARMM was created in response to the Moro rebellion, but said that in principle he did not disagree with the idea. "If ARMM could not produce tangible result for the sentiment of our people then ARMM has no business to exist. What I'm saying is, let's give ARMM a chance to prove if it is worthy," he said.

== Business Activities ==
Tupay Loong is known to have a seaweed farming business.
