= Abdusakur Tan II =

Filipino politician (born 1977)

- اَبْدُسَكُرْ تَنْ ٢
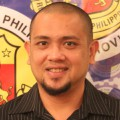
- Tan in 2016

Governor of Sulu
- Incumbent
- Assumed office June 30, 2025
- Vice Governor: Abdusakur Mahail Tan
- Preceded by: Abdusakur Mahail Tan
- In office June 30, 2013 – June 30, 2019
- Vice Governor: Abdusakur Mahail Tan (2013–2016); Nurunisah Abubakar-Tan (2016–2019)
- Preceded by: Abdusakur Mahail Tan
- Succeeded by: Abdusakur Mahail Tan

Vice Governor of Sulu
- In office June 30, 2019 – June 30, 2025
- Governor: Abdusakur Mahail Tan
- Preceded by: Abdusakur Mahail Tan
- Succeeded by: Abdusakur Mahail Tan

Personal details
- Born: Abdusakur Abubakar Tan II; March 17, 1977 (age 49)
- Party: Lakas (2024–present)
- Other political affiliations: PDP–Laban (2018–2024); Liberal (2012–2018)
- Relations: Samier Tan (brother); Shernee Tan-Tambut (sister)
- Parent(s): Abdusakur Mahail Tan (father); Nurunisah Abubakar (mother)

Abdusakur "Toto" Abubakar Tan II (born March 17, 1977) is a Filipino politician who is the governor of Sulu since 2025, a position he previously held from 2013 to 2019.

== Early life ==
Abdusakur Abubakar Tan II was born on March 17, 1977. He is born to Abdusakur Mahail Tan and Hadja Nurunisah Abubakar and has four siblings.

== Political career ==
=== Governor of Sulu (2013–2019) ===
In the 2013 elections, Abdusakur "Toto" Tan II got elected as governor of Sulu. His vice governor is his father, Abdusakur Mahail Tan who was his predecessor holding office from 2007. The younger Tan was reelected in the 2016 elections.

In September 2016, the younger Tan was suspended for a month due to failure to file his statement of assets, liabilities and net worth (SALNs). Tan held office until 2019.

Toto Tan received a plaque and citation from the Philippine National Police in early 2019 for his efforts in dealing crime in the province and for the Sulu Provincial Office being the top police office within the PRO ARMM in the campaign against illegal drugs.

=== Vice governor of Sulu (2019–2025) ===
In the 2019 elections, the younger Tan dropped to the Sulu vice governor position with the elder Tan getting elected as Sulu governor. This governor-vice governor setup by the father-son duo remain in place until 2025.

=== Governor of Sulu (2025–present) ===
In the 2025 elections, the father-son switched roles with the elder Tan ineligible for a fourth term as governor. His father ran as his vice governor. They ran under the Lakas CMD

Tan supported the exclusion of Sulu from the Bangsamoro region and its eventual inclusion to the Zamboanga Peninsula Region in 2025.

== Personal life ==
Abdusakur Tan II is married to Charina Kiram with whom he has three children. He is part of a political family with his father having been Sulu governor and a congressman and his mother having been Sulu vice governor.

== Electoral history ==
Electoral history of Abdusakur Tan II
Year	Office	Party	Votes received				Result
Year	Office	Party	Total	%	P.	Swing	Result
2013	Governor of Sulu	Liberal	164,013	85.24%	1st	—N/a	Won
2016	Governor of Sulu	Liberal	179,626	—N/a	1st	—N/a	Won
2025	Governor of Sulu	Lakas	362,986	96.28%	1st	—N/a	Won
2019	Vice Governor of Sulu	PDP–Laban	134,633	—N/a	1st	—N/a	Won
2022	Vice Governor of Sulu	PDP–Laban	343,050	100.00%	1st	—N/a	Unopposed
