= Governor of Sulu =

Local chief executive

Provincial Governor of Sulu
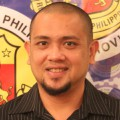
- Incumbent; Abdusakur Tan II since June 30, 2025
- Appointer: Elected via popular vote
- Term length: 3 years
- Formation: 1917

The governor of Sulu (Filipino: Punong Panlalawigan ng Sulu), is the chief executive of the provincial government of Sulu.

== Provincial Governors ==
	Governor	Term
1	Kalingalan Caluang	1948
2	Hadji Arsad Sali	1964-1967
3	Habib Tupay T. Loong	1984-1995
4	Al-Hassan Caluang	1995-1996
5	Hajib Munib Estino	1995-1996
6	Abdusakur Tan	1996-2001
7	Yusop Jikiri	2001-2004
8	Benjamin T. Loong	2004-2007
9	Abdusakur Tan	2007-2013
10	Abdusakur A. Tan II	2013-2019
11	Abdusakur Tan	2019-2025
12	Abdusakur A. Tan II	2025-present
