= Benigno Aquino =

Benigno Aquino may refer to:

- Benigno Aquino Sr. (1894–1947), Filipino politician and speaker of the House of Representatives from 1943 to 1944
- Ninoy Aquino (1932–1983), also known as Benigno Aquino Jr., Filipino politician, son of Benigno Sr., former senator, and former governor of Tarlac
- Benigno Aquino III (1960–2021), Filipino politician, son of Benigno Jr., and 15th president of the Philippines
- Bam Aquino (born 1977), also known as Paolo Benigno Aquino IV, Filipino politician, cousin of Benigno III, incumbent senator
