= Parang, Sulu =

Municipality in Sulu, Philippines

Parang فَرَڠْ
- Municipality
- Municipality of Parang
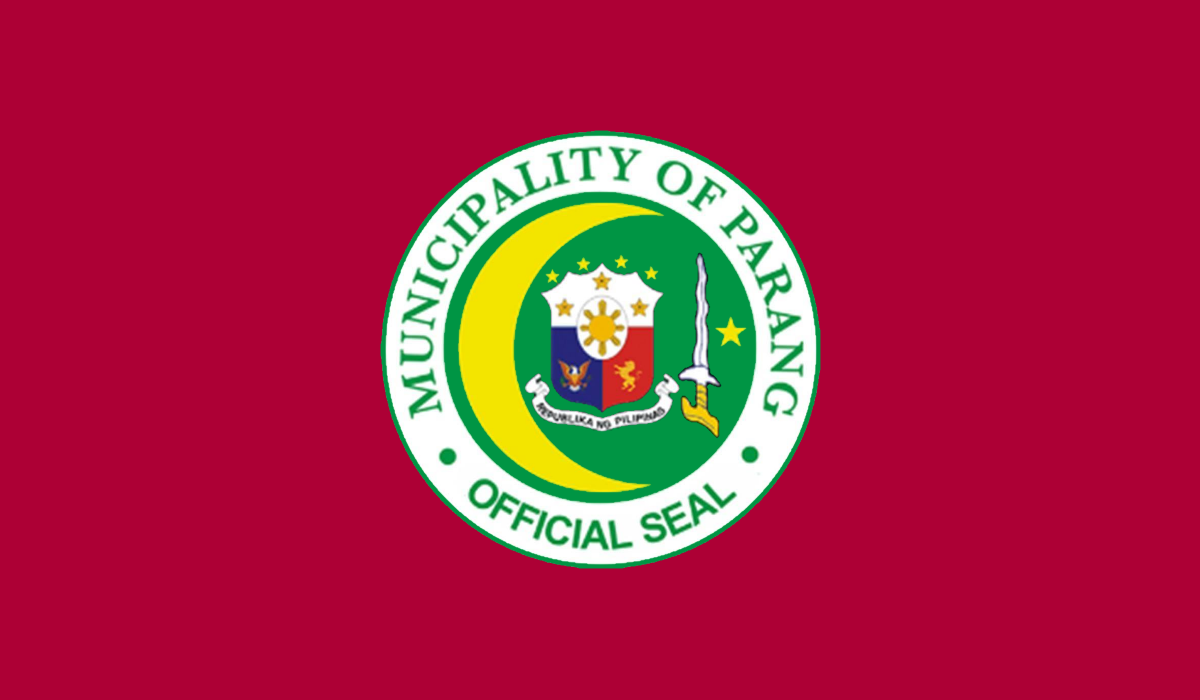
- Flag Seal

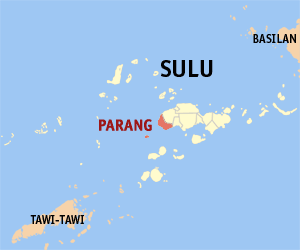
- Map of Sulu with Parang highlighted
- Interactive map of Parang
- Location within the Philippines
- Coordinates: 5°55′N 120°55′E
- Country: Philippines
- Region: Zamboanga Peninsula
- Province: Sulu
- District: 1st district
- Barangays: 40 (see Barangays)

Government
  - Type: Sangguniang Bayan
  - Mayor: Alkhadar T. Loong
  - Vice Mayor: Madzhar T. Loong
  - Representative: Samier A. Tan
  - Municipal Council: Members: Rudimar B. Tingkahan; Benjar A. Uding; Datu Madzkan M. Alimuddin; Jackaria D. Askali; Cindy H. Irilis; Pang A. Ailingan; Al-Hambra M. Loong; Kimlian M. Galbon
  - Electorate: 41,062 voters (2025)

Area
  - Total: 258.00 km^{2} (99.61 sq mi)
- Elevation: 57 m (187 ft)
- Highest elevation: 366 m (1,201 ft)
- Lowest elevation: 0 m (0 ft)

Population (2024 census)
  - Total: 83,092
  - Density: 322.06/km^{2} (834.14/sq mi)
  - Households: 11,393

Economy
  - Income class: 1st municipal income class
  - Poverty incidence: 25.87% (2023)
  - Revenue: ₱ 280.3 million (2022)
  - Assets: ₱ 823.4 million (2022)
  - Expenditure: ₱ 201.6 million (2022)
  - Liabilities: ₱ 111.1 million (2022)

Service provider
  - Electricity: Sulu Electric Cooperative (SULECO)
- Time zone: UTC+8 (PST)
- ZIP code: 7408
- PSGC: 1906609000
- IDD : area code: +63 (0)68
- Native languages: Tausug; Tagalog

Parang, officially the Municipality of Parang (Tausūg: Kawman sin Parang; Filipino: Bayan ng Parang), is a municipality in the province of Sulu, Philippines. According to the 2024 census, it has a population of 83,092 people.

== Geography ==
=== Barangays ===
Parang is politically subdivided into 40 barangays. Each barangay consists of puroks while some have sitios.

- Alu Layag-Layag
- Alu Pangkoh
- Bagsak
- Bawisan
- Biid
- Bukid
- Buli Bawang
- Buton
- Buton Mahablo
- Danapa
- Duyan Kabao
- Gimba Lagasan
- Kaha
- Kahoy Sinah
- Kanaway
- Kutah Sairap
- Lagasan Higad
- Lanao Dakula
- Laum Buwahan
- Laum Suwah
- Liang
- Linuho
- Lipunos
- Lower Sampunay
- Lumbaan Mahaba
- Lungan Gitong
- Lupa Abu
- Nonokan
- Paugan
- Payuhan
- Piyahan
- Poblacion (Parang)
- Saldang
- Sampunay
- Silangkan
- Taingting
- Tikong
- Tukay
- Tumangas
- Wanni Piyanjihan

=== Climate ===
Climate data for Parang, Sulu
Month	Jan	Feb	Mar	Apr	May	Jun	Jul	Aug	Sep	Oct	Nov	Dec	Year
Mean daily maximum °C (°F)	27 (81)	27 (81)	27 (81)	28 (82)	28 (82)	28 (82)	28 (82)	28 (82)	28 (82)	28 (82)	28 (82)	28 (82)	28 (82)
Mean daily minimum °C (°F)	27 (81)	26 (79)	27 (81)	27 (81)	28 (82)	28 (82)	28 (82)	28 (82)	28 (82)	28 (82)	28 (82)	27 (81)	28 (81)
Average precipitation mm (inches)	170 (6.7)	130 (5.1)	125 (4.9)	122 (4.8)	229 (9.0)	286 (11.3)	254 (10.0)	248 (9.8)	182 (7.2)	257 (10.1)	233 (9.2)	188 (7.4)	2,424 (95.5)
Average rainy days	18.3	15.3	15.2	14.6	22.8	24.0	24.3	23.3	20.5	22.6	21.9	19.3	242.1
Source: Meteoblue (modeled/calculated data, not measured locally)

== Demographics ==
Population census of Parang
Year	Pop.	±% p.a.
1918	20,051	—
1939	22,572	+0.57%
1948	18,309	−2.30%
1960	24,768	+2.55%
1970	21,115	−1.58%
1975	12,360	−10.18%
1980	22,304	+12.53%
1990	43,273	+6.85%
1995	48,124	+2.01%
2000	54,994	+2.90%
2007	65,019	+2.34%
2010	58,028	−4.06%
2015	62,172	+1.32%
2020	71,495	+2.98%
2024	83,092	+3.67%
Source: Philippine Statistics Authority

== Economy ==
Poverty Incidence of Parang

Source: Philippine Statistics Authority
