= Hajan Sawadjaan =

Filipino militant (died 2020)

Hatib Hajan Sawadjaan هَجَنْ هَتِبْ سَوَجَّأَنْ
- Born: Hatib Hajan Sawadjaan; Jolo, Sulu, Philippines
- Died: July 2020 Patikul, Sulu, Philippines
- Allegiance: Moro National Liberation Front (until 1992); Abu Sayyaf (1992–2020); Islamic State
- Conflicts: Moro conflict

Hatib Hajan Sawadjaan (died July 2020) was a Filipino militant affiliated with the Abu Sayyaf. He was the leader of the group which has associated itself with the Islamic State (IS) since 2014.

== Early life ==
Hajan Sawadjaan was born in Jolo, Sulu, to a peasant family. He likely only finished primary education according to a source from the Philippine military. Due to financial difficulties, he worked as a lumberjack in Patikul and married a woman native of Barangay Tanum.

== Career ==
As an elder, he served as a preacher in a local mosque. His involvement in preaching earned him the title of "hatib" or sermon leader in Arabic.

Sawadjaan first joined the secessionist group, Moro National Liberation Front and was under commander Radulan Sahiron. He went with Sahiron in breaking away from the MNLF to join the Abu Sayyaf in 1992. At that time the group has been recently organized by Yusop Jikiri who was also a leader of the MNLF.

Abu Sayyaf would affiliate themselves to the Islamic State (IS) group.

In 2017, Abu Sayyaf leader Isnilon Hapilon was killed during the Battle of Marawi. Hapilon was the designated as "emir" for IS operations in Southeast Asia. According to Filipino authorities Sawadjaan sometime in 2018 has pledged to become the leader of IS affiliated groups in the Philippines. A United States report likewise said that Sawadjaan is serving as acting "emir" of IS in the region although has maintained that there are no confirmed direct links with Filipino militants with the central organization of the Middle East-based IS.

== Death ==
On July 6, 2020, Hajan Sawadjaan was severely wounded during an encounter with the government troops in Barangay Bakong, Patikul, Sulu and died from his injuries a few days later. After the encounter with the government troops, he was found and buried by the group of his cousin Mundi Sawadjaan, an Abu Sayyaf sub-leader.
