= Patikul =

Municipality in Sulu, Philippines

Patikul فَتِكُلْ
- Municipality
- Municipality of Patikul
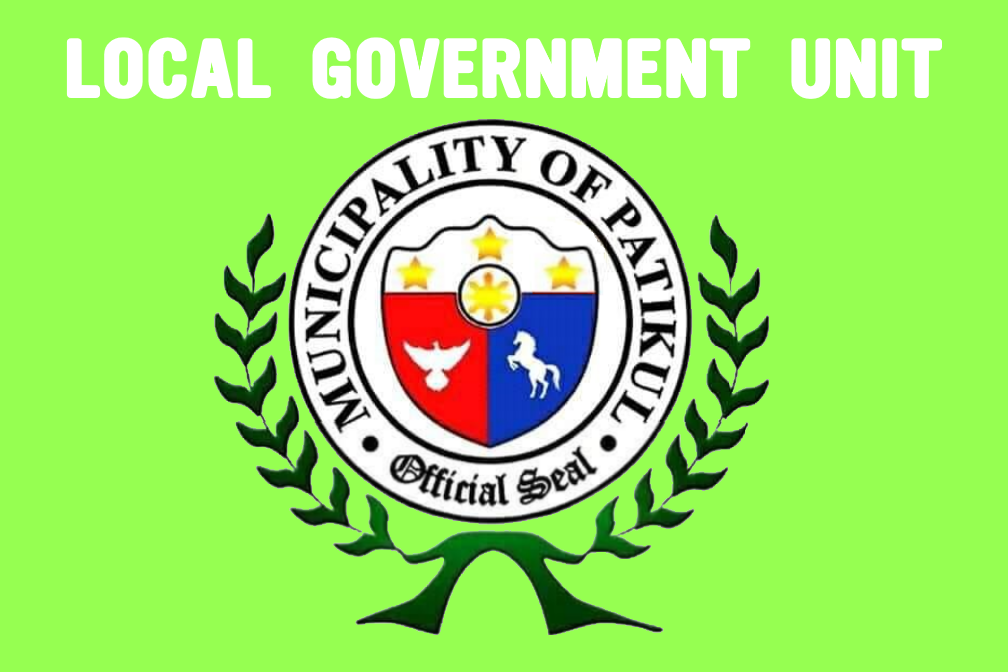
- Flag Seal

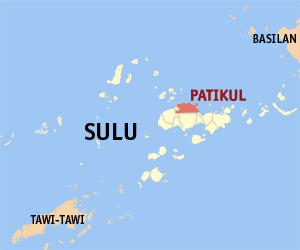
- Map of Sulu with Patikul highlighted
- Interactive map of Patikul
- Location within the Philippines
- Coordinates: 6°05′21″N 121°06′20″E
- Country: Philippines
- Region: Zamboanga Peninsula
- Province: Sulu
- District: 1st district
- Barangays: 30 (see Barangays)

Government
  - Type: Sangguniang Bayan
  - Mayor: Kabir E. Hayudini
  - Vice Mayor: Pulaus A. Tarsum
  - Representative: Samier A. Tan
  - Municipal Council: Members: Benzead S. Hayudini; Mumarzhen M. Suhuri; Datu Teddy I. Bahjin; Fashier K. Julkarnain; Abuk G. Ahajani; Abdulgafar A. Mangkabong; Musa T. Salih; Muntasir M. Ibrahim
  - Electorate: 45,483 voters (2025)

Area
  - Total: 330.04 km^{2} (127.43 sq mi)
- Elevation: 74 m (243 ft)
- Highest elevation: 581 m (1,906 ft)
- Lowest elevation: 0 m (0 ft)

Population (2024 census)
  - Total: 92,600
  - Density: 281/km^{2} (727/sq mi)
  - Households: 13,776

Economy
  - Income class: 1st municipal income class
  - Poverty incidence: 7.62% (2023)
  - Revenue: ₱ 309.7 million (2022)
  - Assets: ₱ 326.6 million (2022)
  - Expenditure: ₱ 290.1 million (2022)
  - Liabilities: ₱ 24.57 million (2022)

Service provider
  - Electricity: Sulu Electric Cooperative (SULECO)
- Time zone: UTC+8 (PST)
- ZIP code: 7401
- PSGC: 1906611000
- IDD : area code: +63 (0)68
- Native languages: Tausug; Tagalog

Patikul, officially the Municipality of Patikul, (Note: Tausūg: Kawman sin Patikul; Filipino: Bayan ng Patikul) is a municipality and seat of government of the province of Sulu, Philippines. According to the 2024 census, it has a population of 92,600 people. The provincial capitol and offices are located in this municipality.

The municipality is used to be known for being a stronghold of the Abu Sayyaf insurgent group.

== History ==
=== Colonial period ===
==== Spanish occupation ====
The municipality of Patikul, situated 13.5 kilometers east of Jolo, was a settlement at an isolated hill, far from the beach, by the 19th century. In 1876, the expedition aimed to conquer the Jolo island, led by Governor-General José Malcampo and consisted of 9,000 troops which had left Manila on February 5, had a force disembarked at the area on the 22nd, a day after reaching the island through Zamboanga. The Moros resisted, causing some casualties, but later escaped. Following the destruction of Jolo, the datus dispersed in all directions, except those remained in Tandu and Patikul, then the strongest, but later formed a party loyal to the sultan.

In the late 1870s, two candidates for sultan were both proclaimed—Amirul Kiram of Maimbung (Maymbung), as suggested by Sulu governor Julian Gonzales Parrado; and Datu Aliyud Din of Patikul, who was supposed to be the regent but such suggestion was opposed by the party, marking the start of armed conflicts. In 1885, the Maimbung forces attacked the outnumbered Patikul party, defeating them, destroying the camp, and burning the settlement. Aliyud Din later fled to Basilan.

In 1887 and 1888, Patikul, along with other areas, was attacked by forces led by governor Juan Arolas and loyal to Sultan Harun, killing several natives. Meanwhile, Datu Aliyud Din returned to Patikul in late 1886, and for about a year, was defended against forces of Maimbung and those loyal to Sultan Harun. He temporarily left the area for a year, and lived until his death, about 1892. Patikul and Maimbung parties remained divided, even the Spaniards left the country and the Americans occupied Jolo in 1899.

Natives of Lati and Patikul were involved in the deadly attack of Jolo when hostilities broke out shortly in 1895.

==== American occupation ====
Decade-old rivalries between the major Moro leaders continued. The district of Patikul was controlled by brothers, Datus Jokanain and Kalbi, close American allies who traditionally opposed to Sultan Jamalul Kiram II. The datus and Panglima Bandahala played a key role during the failed three-day negotiations with Moros in Bud Dajo—many of whom were the datus' followers—convincing them to come down. Panglima Imlam and Imam Harib, members of a runaway faction, occupied and defended the eastern summit of the volcanic mountain, which was attacked by Americans in March 1906.

=== Contemporary ===
Patikul was used to be strongholds of the Moro National Liberation Front (MNLF) and the Abu Sayyaf (ASG); and along with the rest of Sulu, has been the scene of clashes with the military. On January 18, 1977, the first group of some 700 MNLF rebels, led by then district chairperson and former mayor Usman Sali, and a Philippine–Libyan ceasefire team were met and "pledged" to halt military activities in his area. However, Sali was involved in an attack on October 10 on the soldiers of the 1st Infantry (Tabak) Division of the Philippine Army in a public market in Barrio Danag, by 150 insurgents under him being a rogue commander, who lured them into a "peace dialogue". Thirty-five, including their commander, Brig. Gen. Teodulfo Bautista, were killed; a soldier survived.

On February 20, 1996, a Marine offensive against the ASG in Kanjamak killed fourteen extremists. The MNLF later claimed that at the height of the offensive, seven Muslim worshippers were killed by troopers in a mosque in Tanum, which was later denied by the Armed Forces Southern Command.

Patikul had its power connection energized through a project by the National Electrification Administration in the late 1996.

On 2 February 2019, five soldiers were killed and five others injured in a shootout with the ISIL-linked group, Abu Sayyaf, in Patikul. Three terrorists were killed and 15 others were injured. The attack happened a week after a bombing that killed 20 people in a cathedral in the neighboring city of Jolo.

On June 4, 2021, A Lockheed C-130 Hercules aircraft of the Philippine Air Force (PAF) crashed in Patikul, Sulu, killing 53 people. The incident is the deadliest aviation accident involving the Philippine military.

== Geography ==
=== Barangays ===
Patikul is politically subdivided into 30 barangays. Each barangay consists of puroks while some have sitios.

- Anuling
- Bakong
- Bangkal
- Bonbon
- Buhanginan (Darayan)
- Bungkaung
- Danag
- Gandasuli
- Igasan
- Kabbon Takas
- Kadday Mampallam
- Kan Ague
- Kaunayan
- Langhub
- Latih
- Liang
- Maligay
- Mauboh
- Pangdanon
- Panglayahan
- Pansul
- Patikul Higad
- Sandah
- Taglibi (Poblacion)
- Tandu-Bagua
- Tanum
- Taung
- Timpok
- Tugas
- Umangay

=== Climate ===
Climate data for Patikul, Sulu
Month	Jan	Feb	Mar	Apr	May	Jun	Jul	Aug	Sep	Oct	Nov	Dec	Year
Mean daily maximum °C (°F)	27 (81)	27 (81)	27 (81)	28 (82)	28 (82)	28 (82)	28 (82)	28 (82)	28 (82)	28 (82)	28 (82)	28 (82)	28 (82)
Mean daily minimum °C (°F)	27 (81)	26 (79)	27 (81)	27 (81)	28 (82)	28 (82)	28 (82)	28 (82)	28 (82)	28 (82)	28 (82)	27 (81)	28 (81)
Average precipitation mm (inches)	170 (6.7)	130 (5.1)	125 (4.9)	122 (4.8)	229 (9.0)	286 (11.3)	254 (10.0)	248 (9.8)	182 (7.2)	257 (10.1)	233 (9.2)	188 (7.4)	2,424 (95.5)
Average rainy days	18.3	15.3	15.2	14.6	22.8	24.0	24.3	23.3	20.5	22.6	21.9	19.3	242.1
Source: Meteoblue (modeled/calculated data, not measured locally)

== Demographics ==
Population census of Patikul
Year	Pop.	±% p.a.
1918	14,594	—
1939	17,469	+0.86%
1948	16,353	−0.73%
1960	20,912	+2.07%
1970	22,577	+0.77%
1975	12,187	−11.63%
1980	26,208	+16.54%
1990	30,455	+1.51%
1995	30,699	+0.15%
2000	34,396	+2.47%
2007	56,805	+7.16%
2010	42,036	−10.38%
2015	62,287	+7.78%
2020	79,564	+5.29%
2024	92,600	+3.71%
Source: Philippine Statistics Authority

== Economy ==
Poverty Incidence of Patikul

Source: Philippine Statistics Authority
