= Abdusakur Mahail Tan =

Filipino politician (born 1950)

- اَبْدُسَكُرْ مَهَئِلْ تَنْ
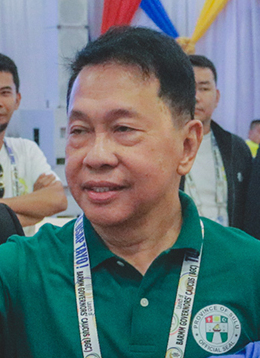
- Tan in 2023

Governor of Sulu
- In office June 30, 2019 – June 30, 2025
- Vice Governor: Abdusakur Tan II
- Preceded by: Abdusakur Tan II
- Succeeded by: Abdusakur Tan II
- In office June 30, 2007 – June 30, 2013
- Vice Governor: Nur-Ana Sahidulla (2007–2010); Benjamin Loong (2010–2013)
- Preceded by: Benjamin Loong
- Succeeded by: Abdusakur Tan II
- In office 1996 – June 30, 2001
- Preceded by: Hajib Munib Estino
- Succeeded by: Yusop Jikiri

Vice Governor of Sulu
- Incumbent
- Assumed office June 30, 2025
- Governor: Abdusakur Tan II
- Preceded by: Abdusakur Tan II
- In office June 30, 2013 – June 30, 2016
- Governor: Abdusakur Tan II
- Preceded by: Benjamin Loong
- Succeeded by: Nurunisah Abubakar-Tan

Member of the Philippine House of Representatives from the First District of Sulu
- In office June 30, 1987 – June 30, 1992
- Preceded by: Post created
- Succeeded by: Bensaudi Tulawie

Member of the Municipal Council of Jolo
- In office 1981–1987

Personal details
- Born: Abdusakur Mahail Tan; July 13, 1950 (age 76) Maimbung, Sulu, Philippines
- Party: Lakas–CMD (2008–2012; 2024–present)
- Other political affiliations: PDP (2018–2024); Liberal (until 1992; 2012–2018); KAMPI (2007–2008); PMP (2001–2007)
- Spouse: Nurunisah Abubakar
- Children: 5 (inc. Samier, Shernee and Abdusakur II)

Abdusakur "Sakur" Mahail Tan (born July 13, 1950) is a Filipino politician who served as the vice governor of Sulu since 2025, a position he previously held from 2013 to 2016. He served as governor of Sulu from 2019 to 2025, a position he previously held from 2007 to 2013 and from 1996 to 2001.

== Background ==
Tan is of Chinese-Tausug descent and was born on July 13, 1950, in Maimbung, Sulu, the eldest child of Abubakar Tan (former mayor of Maimbung) and Satriya Mahail. He attended high school at the Notre Dame of Jolo for Boys and obtained a bachelor's degree in 1983 from the Notre Dame of Jolo College.

He is married to Nurunisah Abubakar-Tan, former Vice Governor of Sulu (daughter of former Jolo mayor Habib Aminkandra N. Abubakar) and has five children.

== Political career ==
Tan established a political base in Jolo by aligning himself with the Abubakar and Isquerdo families. He served first as a municipal councilor of Jolo (1981–1987), then as the representative of Sulu's first congressional district (1987–1992) and as governor (1996–2001). He lost the 2001 election to MNLF leader Yusop Jikiri but won the governorship a second time in 2007 with 110,715 votes. In 2010 he won re-election, beating rivals Munir Arbison and Nur Misuari by over 24,000 votes.

=== 2010 Zamboanga City airport bombing ===
Tan was among 12 persons injured when an improvised explosive device (IED) exploded at the arrival area of Zamboanga International Airport in August 2010. The attack was suspected to target Tan himself. The explosion occurred a few days after a suspected member of the regional terrorist group Jemaah Islamiyah (JI), Edgar Malaydan, was arrested in Monkayo, Compostela Valley.

=== 2026 Bangsamoro election ===
On May 18, 2024, Tan announced that he would forego another term as governor in the 2025 local election and challenge Murad Ebrahim as Chief Minister of the Bangsamoro in the 2026 parliamentary elections during a rally in Maimbung. He received support from the BARMM Grand Coalition composed of the Serbisyong Inklusibo-Alyansang Progresibo Party, Al-Ittihad–UKB Party, Tan’s Salam Party, and the Bangsamoro People's Party.

Tan presumably became ineligible to run for chief minister after the Supreme Court ruled on September 9, 2024 that Sulu was not part of the BARMM due to a majority of its voters choosing not to join the region in a 2019 plebiscite. Tan and his son, Abdusakur Tan II, had previously opposed Sulu's inclusion into the BARMM, with the latter, in his capacity as governor of Sulu, filing the petition that led to the Supreme Court decision. Tan welcomed the Supreme Court ruling despite its implication on his Chief Minister bid, believing that the province's exclusion from the autonomous region would be beneficial economically in the long run.
