= Samier Tan =

Filipino politician (born 1982)

- سَمِرْ تَنْ
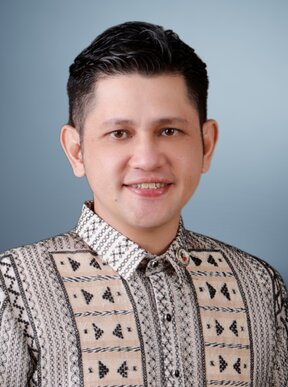
- Official portrait, 2025

Member of the House of Representatives from Sulu’s 1st District
- Incumbent
- Assumed office June 30, 2019
- Preceded by: Tupay Loong

Mayor of Maimbung
- In office June 30, 2010 – June 30, 2019
- Vice Mayor: Pando Mudjasan
- Succeeded by: Shihla Tan-Hayudini

Personal details
- Born: Samier Abubakar Tan; March 3, 1982 (age 44) Jolo, Sulu, Philippines
- Party: Lakas (2009–2012; 2022–present)
- Other political affiliations: PDP–Laban (2018–2022); Liberal (2012–2018)
- Parent(s): Abdusakur Mahail Tan (father); Nurunisah Abubakar (mother)
- Relatives: Abdusakur Tan II (brother); Shernee Tan-Tambut (sister)
- Occupation: Politician

Samier Abubakar Tan (born March 3, 1982) is a Filipino politician. He is currently serving as representative for the 1st District of Sulu in the House of Representatives of the Philippines since 2019. He served as mayor of Maimbung from 2010 to 2019.

== Early years ==
Tan was born on March 3, 1982, in Jolo, Sulu, to then-Councilor Abdusakur Mahail Tan and Nurunisah Abubakar.

== Political career ==
=== Mayor of Maimbung (2010–2019) ===
In 2010, Tan was elected as mayor of Maimbung where he served for three consecutive terms.

=== House of Representatives (2019–present) ===
In 2019, Tan was elected as representative for first district of Sulu.

== Controversies ==
=== SALN Proceedings ===
On September 27, 2016, the Office of the Ombudsman found Samier Tan administratively liable for the administrative offense of "habitual failure" to file his Statements of Assets, Liabilities, and Net Worth (SALNs) and imposed a six-month suspension without pay. The administrative case arose from his failure to file his SALNs for 2010 to 2011.

Section 8(a) of Republic Act No. 6713 (Code of Conduct and Ethical Standards for Public Officials and Employees) requires public officials and employees to file a sworn SALN annually by April 30, as well as within 30 days of assuming and leaving public service. In February 2018, the Office of the Ombudsman filed criminal charges before the Sandiganbayan against Samier Tan and his father, former Sulu Governor Abdusakur Tan Sr. for violating Section 8 of the Act by "willfully, unlawfully, and criminally" failing to file their SALNs, together with the required Disclosure of Business Interest and Financial Connections and Identification of Relatives in Government Service.

Samier Tan was charged with two counts for allegedly failing to file his SALNs for 2010 and 2011, while his father faced five counts for the alleged non-filing of SALNs from 2007 to 2011. The Office of the Ombudsman recommended bail of ₱50,000 and ₱20,000 for Abdusakur Tan Sr. and Samier Tan, respectively, in connection with the criminal charges. Later in 2018, Abdusakur Tan Sr. was convicted on five counts for failing to file his SALNs for 2007-2011 after pleading guilty before the Sandiganbayan. He was ordered to pay a fine of ₱25,000.

== Personal life ==
Tan is married to Patrice Ting and has two children.

His brother, Abdusakur Tan II, is the current governor of Sulu since 2025. His sister, Shernee Tan-Tambut, is the current vice mayor of Maimbung since 2025.

== Electoral history ==
Electoral history of Samier Tan
Year	Office	Party	Votes received				Result	Ref.
Year	Office	Party	Total	%	P.	Swing	Result	Ref.
2010	Mayor of Maimbung	Lakas–Kampi	8,488	—N/a	1st	—N/a	Won	
2013	Mayor of Maimbung	Liberal	15,385	—N/a	1st	—N/a	Won	
2016	Mayor of Maimbung	Liberal	22,465	—N/a	1st	—N/a	Unopposed	
2019	Representative (Sulu–1st)	PDP–Laban	83,670	—N/a	1st	—N/a	Won	
2022	Representative (Sulu–1st)	PDP–Laban	186,240	100.00%	1st	—N/a	Unopposed	
2025	Representative (Sulu–1st)	Lakas	204,178	98.29%	1st	—N/a	Won	
