= Philippines and the Islamic State =

Islamic State insurgency in the Philippines
- Part of the War against the Islamic State, War on terror and Civil conflict in the Philippines
Date	23 July 2014 – present
Location	Primarily in Mindanao, Philippines
Result	Islamist groups significantly reduced and weakened after the end of Operation Enduring Freedom - Philippines; Ansar Khalifa Philippines dissolves in 2024; Low-level insurgency continues; Maute Group renews insurgency in 2023

Belligerents
Philippines; ARMM (until 2019); Bangsamoro (from 2019); Bangsamoro groups; Moro National Liberation Front; Moro Islamic Liberation Front	Islamic State of Iraq and the Levant; Dawlah Islamiyah; Abu Sayyaf

Commanders and leaders
Bongbong Marcos (Philippines) Gilbert Teodoro (Philippines) Antonio Nafarrete; Jose Melencio Nartatez; Nur Misuari; Murad Ebrahim	Ismael Abubakar †; Esmail Sheikh Abdulmalik # (surrendered); Isnilon Hapilon †; Omar Maute †; Abdullah Maute †; Mohammad Maguid †

Units involved
Government of the Philippines; Armed Forces of the Philippines; Army; Air Force; Navy; Marine Corps; Philippine Coast Guard; Philippine National Police; SAF; PNP Maritime Group; Bangsamoro; MNLF; Bangsa Moro Army; MILF; BIAF; MNLF and BIAF remnant militias	Dawlah Islamiyah; Maute Group; Sulu; Hassan Group; Abu Sayyaf (Hapilon Faction) (until 2017); Ansar Khalifa Philippines (until 2024); Basilan (until 2024); Toraife Group (2015-2026); Bungos Group (2015-2018)

Strength
	50 (2025)

Casualties and losses
Almost 240+ killed	Almost 1,680+ killed
- 165+ civilians dead

The Philippines is one of the state opponents of the militant group, the Islamic State of Iraq and the Levant (ISIL), more commonly referred to by the local media as the Islamic State of Iraq and Syria (ISIS).

The local jihadist groups through which ISIL maintains operations include the Maute group, Abu Sayyaf, the Bangsamoro Islamic Freedom Fighters and Ansar Khalifa Philippines. They follow the school of thought of Muhammad ibn Abd al-Wahhab, commonly referred to as Wahhabism. The groups pledged allegiance to ISIL in 2014 or the following years.

ISIL has been linked to increased suicide bombings by Filipino nationals in 2018 and 2019. This method has rarely been carried out in the Philippines; the few bombings successfully carried out were done by foreigners. The group was suspected to be involved in the 2018 Lamitan, 2019 Jolo Cathedral and Indanan bombings.

== Main events timeline ==
=== 2014 ===
On July 23, Abu Sayyaf leader Isnilon Hapilon pledged allegiance to ISIL through a video posted on YouTube. This is an indication of ISIL presence in the Philippines.

=== 2015 ===
In April, the Wahhabi Maute group pledged allegiance to ISIL along with the Ansar Khalifa Philippines terrorist organization, vowing to provide support for each other. The Maute Group was a strong manifestation of the rise of family terrorism in the Philippines.

On November 16, when the APEC Summit was to be held in Manila, a video of men in masks with ISIL black flag behind them is posted on Facebook, claiming "ISIL in Mindanao" will attack the summit.

=== 2017 ===
May 23

A video discovered on a cellphone seized by AFP during a raid on a safe house in Marawi shows the militants including Hapilon and Maute brothers were planning an attack on Marawi. The attack was the 4th step for them to gain the approval of the ISIL leadership: "requires the conduct of widespread atrocities and uprisings all across Mindanao."

June 1

Eight foreign militants had been killed in Marawi, five of which they have identified as Malaysian, Indonesian, Saudi Arabian, Yemeni and a Chechen.

October 16

Isnilon Hapilon and Omar Maute was reportedly killed.

October 19

The Malaysian terrorist Mahmud Ahmad who helped finance the Marawi siege and recruit foreign fighters was killed.

=== 2023 ===
September 21

Three farmers were killed in a gun attack in Kauswagan, Lanao del Norte.

December 3

ISIS claimed responsibility for the Mindanao State University bombing.

=== 2024 ===
April 19

Philippine forces killed an Islamic State militant, who had been implicated in past beheadings, including of 10 Filipino marines and two kidnapped Vietnamese, in a clash in the southern Philippines.

December 17

Three members of the Intelligence Service of the Armed Forces of the Philippines (ISAFP) were killed in an ambush in Basilan province, authorities said Tuesday.

=== 2026 ===
January 30

On January 30, 2026, the Islamic State – East Asia Province claimed an ambush that killed 4 soldiers. This is the group's first claimed attack since October 2024.

== ISIL's support ==
In March 2016, training manuals, bandanas with ISIL inscriptions, and other documents for militants under the ISIL were recovered after the military captured a Maute group camp, indicating that the group may be trying to link up with ISIL.

On June 21, 2016, ISIL released a video entitled "The Solid Structure", which recognized Abu Sayyaf leader Hapilon as the mujahid authorized to lead the jihadists in the Philippines, and designated him as the emir for Southeast Asia. The video also urged aspiring members who can't go to the Middle East to fight for ISIL in the Philippines instead.

In August 2017, another video released by ISIL asked would-be fighters to go to the Philippines, especially to Marawi City, where militants were under siege from government forces.

== Filipino members of ISIL ==
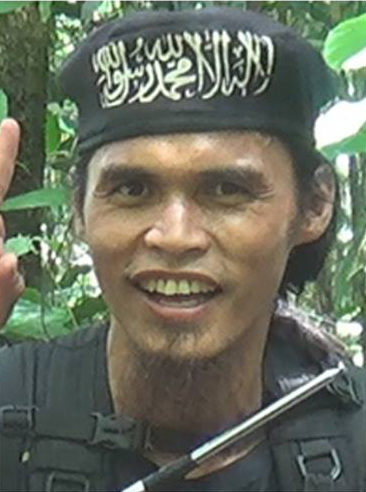
Omar Maute
(Maute group)

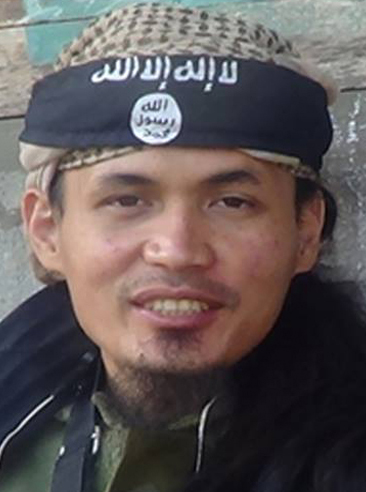
Abdullah Maute
(Maute group)

Involvement of Filipino citizens in ISIL has been reported as early as 2014. According to the Daily Mail citing undisclosed Kurdish sources, a Filipino national was among the ISIL members who appeared in a beheading video of American aid worker Peter Kassig and 18 Syrian soldiers uploaded to YouTube. The Philippine military said that the report could not be verified and said that there was no ISIL recruitment in the Philippines at that time. The Department of Foreign Affairs during this time had been receiving unverified reports of Filipinos training to fight for ISIL in Syria.

In June 2016, ISIL released a video where three of its members, a Filipino, an Indonesian and a Malaysian urged aspiring members who can't go to the Middle East to fight for ISIL in the Philippines instead. In January 2017, Rappler reported that the Filipino member was identified as Mohammad Reza Kiram, a 21-year-old who was the first verified member in ISIL fighting in Syria.

== Non-state opponents of ISIL in the Philippines ==
Aside from the Philippine government, ISIL and its affiliate groups in the Philippines have received armed opposition from other local groups in the country:

- Moro National Liberation Front
- Moro Islamic Liberation Front

== Related clashes ==
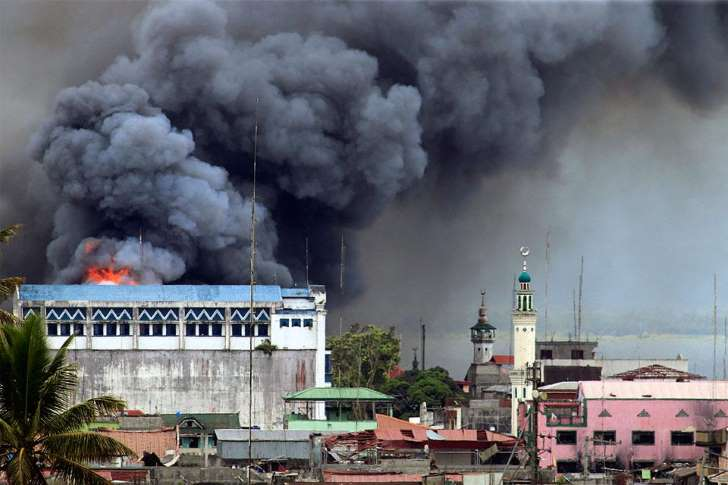
Battle of Marawi.

The following are the list of battle and clashes involving the jihadist groups since they respectively pledged allegiance to ISIS:

- January 25th, 2015, Mamasapano clash
- February 20th - March 1st, 2016, Butig clashes
- April 9th - April 14th, 2016, Battle of Tipo-Tipo
- June 21st - July 12th, 2016, Sulu and Basilan Clashes
- January 4th, 2017, Kidapawan jail siege (suspected involvement)
- April 11th - May 15th, 2017, Bohol clashes
- May 23rd - October 23rd, 2017, Battle of Marawi

== Related terrorist incidents ==
- 2014 Bukidnon bus bombing (suspected involvement of BIFF)
- 2016 Davao City bombing (suspected involvement of Maute Group)
- 2018 Isulan bombings (suspected involvement of BIFF)
- 2018 Lamitan bombing (suspected involvement of Abu Sayyaf)
- 2019 Jolo Cathedral bombings (Abu Sayyaf Involvement)
- 2023 Mindanao State University bombing (Maute Involvement)

== Public opinion on ISIL ==
In a poll conducted between February 16 to May 8, 2017, the Pew Research Center said that 70% of Filipinos questioned view ISIL as a major threat to the Philippines ahead of global climate change (65%) and cyberattacks (64%).

== Casualties ==
The chart below gives information on casualties since the jihadist groups respectively pledged allegiance to ISIS.

Year	Government forces	Civilians	Abu Sayyaf	Maute Group	BIFF
2014		21 dead(July 28); 11 dead(2014 Bukidnon bus bombing in December)	27 killed, in the whole year		
2015	44 killed(Mamasapano clash)	7+ dead(December 24)	133 killed,(only in Sulu) in the whole year		18 killed(Mamasapano clash in January); 139 killed(February 25 – March 22); another 12 killed(March 23 - March 30)
2016	18+(Battle of Tipo-Tipo in April); 15 killed(in late August)	15 dead(2016 Davao City bombing)	31 killed(Battle of Tipo-Tipo in April); 157 killed(July – December 21)	55 killed(February 2016 Butig clash); 22 killed(May 26 – May 28); 63 killed(November 2016 Butig clash)	24 killed(in late February); 8 killed(on July 16)
2017		8 dead(January 10); 7 dead(July 30); 9 dead(August 21)	149 killed? (before May 17) 94 killed?(in the first half of the year)	15 killed(January 26); 36 killed(April 21 – April 24)	
Battle of Marawi	168 killed	87 dead	978 killed		
Total	240+ killed	165+ dead	1681 - 1740+ killed		

Note: Some casualties from small-scale conflicts or terrorist incidents are not given.
