= List of terrorist incidents in the Philippines =

The following is a list of terrorist incidents in the Philippines.

Terrorist incidents in Philippines
Year	Number of incidents	Deaths	Injuries
2017	692	218	+1,400
2016	633	411	720
2015	717	444	752
2014	597	472	723
2013	651	432	666
2012	247	210	440
2011	149	127	224
2010	205	155	231
2009	230	152	354
2008	275	220	388
2007	65	115	404
2006	58	60	163
2005	25	49	149
2004	32	206	160
2003	107	288	531
2002	48	125	342
2001	50	154	274
2000	132	190	643
1999	31	45	190
1998	18	6	85
1997	57	98	273
1996	61	95	143
1995	63	201	102
1994	72	126	198
1993	8	56	216
1992	162	395	465
1991	162	432	247
1990	320	457	340
1989	156	393	323
1988	210	550	256
1987	160	404	485
1986	80	322	355
1985	124	452	377
1984	43	262	108
1983	16	101	30
1982	38	139	250
1981	31	176	362
1980	60	163	540
1979	50	107	76
1978	36	128	193
1977	2	0	0
1976	10	47	73
1975	4	1	45
1974	1	3	0
1973	0	0	0
1972	7	2	1
1971	4	0	0
1970	10	41	13

== Before 2000 ==
=== 1970s ===
Date	Location	Deaths	Injuries	Type	Description
21 August 1971	Manila	9	95	Grenade	Main article: Plaza Miranda bombing Several explosions occurred during a political campaign rally of the Liberal Party at Plaza Miranda in the district of Quiapo, injuring most of the party's senatorial lineup. The Communist Party of the Philippines and the government of President Ferdinand Marcos traded blame for the attack.
January–September 1972	Metro Manila	1	40	Bomb	Main article: 1972 Manila bombings Series of bombings across the Philippine capital that were used by the Marcos government to justify its declaration of Martial Law on 23 September. The government and the political opposition traded blame for the attack.

=== 1980s ===
Date	Location	Deaths	Injuries	Type	Description
August–October 1980	Metro Manila	1	41	Bomb	Series of bombings blamed on anti-Marcos dissidents.
3 October 1980	Tagum, Davao del Norte	4	68	Grenade	Two suspected Muslim rebels riding in a jeep hurled grenades into a market.
19 April 1981	Davao City	17	150+	Grenade	A grenade was hurled during Easter Sunday mass at San Pedro Cathedral. Two young Marxists suspected of carrying out the attack were apprehended.
26 December 1982	Pagadian, Zamboanga del Sur	6	83	Improvised explosive device	The inter-island ferry Santa Lucia was docked at Pagadian with 800 passengers when a homemade bomb exploded killing 3 people and injuring 53 more. Another blast occurred at a market, killing 3 and injuring 33. The attack was blamed on the MNLF.
7 November 1986	Quezon City	0	17	Bombing	A bomb thrown at the screen of a movie theater exploded, the sixth in a series of bombings subsequently believed to have been part of the God Save the Queen Plot.
18 March 1987	Baguio	4	45	Improvised Explosive Device	A bomb exploded at the Philippine Military Academy where President Corazon Aquino was scheduled to speak. Some sources suggested that "disgruntled military elements" may have been responsible.
27 August 1987	Davao City	9	N/A	Gun attack	The New People's Army attacked two radio stations critical of them.
8 December 1987	Metro Manila	0	4	Bombings	A car bomb exploded outside Manila International Airport, followed by another bomb near a shopping center in Makati. A third bomb was discovered and defused in Makati.
16 February 1988	Manila	0	0	Bombing	A bomb detonated outside the Israeli Embassy.

=== 1990s ===
Date	Location	Deaths	Injuries	Type	Description
4 April 1991	Zamboanga City	2+	unknown	Grenade	Two American evangelists were killed when Abu Sayyaf militants launched a grenade attack.
11 August 1991	Zamboanga City	6	32+	Grenade	A grenade thrown by Abu Sayyaf members aboard MV Doulos exploded.
24 December 1993	Bonifacio, Misamis Occidental	5	48+	Grenade	Unidentified men threw grenades into a market.
27 December 1993	Davao City	6	130+	Grenade	Attackers tossed three grenades into San Pedro Cathedral.
10 June 1994	Zamboanga City	71	unknown	Bombing	A series of bombings by Abu Sayyaf.
4 April 1995	Ipil, Zamboanga del Sur (now part of Zamboanga Sibugay	53	48+		200 heavily armed members of Abu Sayyaf entered the town and shot people, took 30 hostages, and pillaged and burned the town to the ground.
3 January 1999	Jolo, Sulu	10	74+	Grenade	Abu Sayyaf militants lobbed a grenade into a crowd that had gathered to watch a blaze.
14 February 1999	Basilan	6	unknown		Abu Sayyaf members attacked a jeep carrying Christian passengers.

== 2000s ==
=== 2000 ===
Date	Location	Deaths	Injuries	Type	Description
10 February	Kabacan, Cotabato	3	14	Improvised Explosive Device	A pregnant woman and 2 others were killed when a bomb exploded at the Sugni Superstore. The Moro Islamic Liberation Front (MILF) was suspected.
20 February	Isabela, Basilan	1	17	Improvised Explosive Device	Three simultaneous bomb attacks by suspected Muslim rebels on police buildings and a restaurant, killing a waiter.
25 February	Ozamiz, Misamis Occidental	41	100+	Improvised Explosive Device	Main article: 2000 Ozamiz ferry bombing A large incendiary bomb exploded aboard a bus on the ferry Lady Mediatrix as it crossed Panguil Bay to Ozamiz, killing up to 41 people. A second bomb went off at about the same time, in another bus owned by the same company at Rizal, Zamboanga del Norte, injuring at least four people.
23 April 2000 - 6 June 2003	Sabah, Malaysia; Sulu	0	several	Hostage situation	Main article: 2000 Sipadan kidnappings Hostage crisis in Sabah, Malaysia, and the southern Philippines that began with the abduction of 21 hostages from the dive resort island of Sipadan on 23 April 2000, by Abu Sayyaf guerrillas who took them to Jolo, Sulu. The Philippine army launched a major offensive on 16 September 2000, rescuing all hostages, except Filipino dive instructor Roland Ullah, who was eventually freed in 2003.
18 May	Jolo, Sulu; Zamboanga City	5	70+	Grenade	Three grenades were thrown into a market in Jolo, killing four and wounding more than 40. At around the same time, in Zamboanga City, one person was killed and more than 30 wounded when a crude time bomb exploded in a bakery-café opposite a police station.
21 May	Mandaluyong	1	17+	Improvised Explosive Device	A janitor died and 17 others were injured after a bomb exploded outside a cinema toilet.
16 July	Kabacan, Cotabato	2	33	Improvised Explosive Device	A bomb exploded in a market. The MILF was suspected of planting the weapon.
31 July	Monkayo, Compostela Valley	3	36	Improvised Explosive Device	An unidentified man threw an improvised explosive device at a crowd in a fairground. No one claimed responsibility for the attack.
30 December	Metro Manila	22	120+	Improvised Explosive Device	Main article: Rizal Day bombings During the Rizal Day holiday, a series of explosions occurred in five locations in Metro Manila within an hour.

=== 2001 ===
Date	Location	Deaths	Injuries	Type	Description
27 May 2001 - 7 June 2002	Puerto Princesa, Palawan; Basilan	40+	Many	Hostage situation	Main article: Dos Palmas kidnappings Hostage crisis that began with the abduction of twenty hostages from an upscale island resort in Palawan by Abu Sayyaf members on 2 May 2001, and resulted in the deaths of at least five hostages, including two American citizens. Other deaths occurred as the abductors moved the hostages around Basilan and engaged in firefights with government forces and attacks on civilian infrastructure.
29 October	Zamboanga City	11	60+	Improvised explosive device	A bomb exploded at a restaurant.

=== 2002 ===
Date	Location	Deaths	Injuries	Type	Description
21 April	General Santos	13	60	Improvised Explosive Device	A bomb exploded outside a busy department store. Two other bombs went off in quick succession near a radio station and a bus terminal. The blasts injured at least 60 people.
2 October	Zamboanga City	~4	24+	Improvised Explosive Device	Main article: 2002 Zamboanga City bombings A bomb blast in front of a karaoke bar near a military arms depot killed an American Green Beret commando and three Filipino civilians.
10 October	Kidapawan, Cotabato	~8	26+	Improvised Explosive Device	A powerful homemade bomb exploded in a bus station.
17 October	Zamboanga City	7	150+	Improvised Explosive Device	Main article: 2002 Zamboanga City bombings Two TNT bombs exploded inside a shopping center.
17 October	Quezon City	3	30+	Improvised Explosive Device	A bomb exploded in a bus.
21 October	Zamboanga City	1	18+	Improvised Explosive Device	Main article: 2002 Zamboanga City bombings A Marine was killed after a bomb placed in a bag at a candle store exploded at Fort Pilar, a Catholic shrine.
24 December	Datu Piang, Maguindanao	13	12	Improvised Explosive Device	A bomb exploded during a party for the mayor Saudi Ampatuan, killing him and 12 others.
31 December	Tacurong, Sultan Kudarat	10	32+	Improvised Explosive Device	An explosive detonated next to a fireworks stall in a market on New Year's Eve.

=== 2003 ===
Date	Location	Deaths	Injuries	Type	Description
20 February	Cotabato City	1	5+	Improvised Explosive Device	A car bomb exploded in front of Awang Airport , killing 1 civilian and wounding several others
28 February	Lanao del Norte	0	0	Improvised Explosive Device	Sabotage attack on the Mindanao electricity grid resulted in 18 million people being cut off after half a dozen transmission towers were blown up.
4 March	Davao City	21	146+	Improvised Explosive Device	A homemade bomb exploded in front of Davao City airport, killing 18 civilians
4 March	Davao City	0	0	Improvised Explosive Device	A bomb exploded at the Ecoland Bus Terminal in Talomo District
4 March	Tagum, Davao Del Norte	0	2	Improvised Explosive Device	A bomb exploded outside a health center, wounding two civilians
2 April	Davao City	17	70+	Improvised Explosive Device	A bomb exploded near a barbecue stand by the Sasa wharf ferry terminal.
23 April	Carmen, Cotabato	4	~9	Automatic weapons fire	Suspected MILF rebels attacked a minibus.
24–25 April	Lanao del Norte	13	20+	Automatic weapons fire	A bus driver and a passenger were killed when suspected MILF members attacked a bus after it failed to halt at a rebel checkpoint in Kolambugan, Lanao del Norte. At least 10 passengers were wounded and several taken hostage. Four policemen were also held hostage after the rebels overran their outpost. 11 civilians were also killed when several dozen MILF guerrillas attacked a fish car in Maigo on the 25th. Another 8 persons were also wounded.
10 May	Koronadal, South Cotabato	10	42+	Improvised Explosive Device	Explosion in a market.
3 October	Midsayap, Cotabato	3	~30	Grenade	An unidentified man hurled grenades into a mosque inside the compound of the National Irrigation Administration during Friday prayers.
5–27 October	Sabah, Malaysia; Tawi-Tawi	5	1	Hostage situation	Six workers - Filipino and Indonesian nationals - were abducted from the Borneo Paradise Resort in Sabah, Malaysia, by suspected Abu Sayyaf fighters and brought to Tawi-Tawi. One worker reportedly escaped while the other five were allegedly killed in a shooting incident outside Languyan, Tawi-Tawi around 27 October.

=== 2004 ===
Date	Location	Deaths	Injuries	Type	Description
4 January	Parang, Maguindanao	24	87+	Improvised Explosive Device	A homemade explosive device attached to a motorcycle parked in front of a gymnasium detonated during a basketball game.
26 February	Cavite City	116	many, unknown	Improvised Explosive Device	Main article: MV SuperFerry 14 A television set containing an 8-pound (3.6 kilograms) TNT bomb exploded in the lower decks of SuperFerry 14 off El Fraile island, starting a fire that engulfed and sank the vessel and caused the deaths of 63 people, while another 53 were reported missing and presumed dead. Redondo Cain Dellosa, a Rajah Sulaiman Movement member, confessed to planting the bomb for the Abu Sayyaf group. The incident is the deadliest terrorist attack in Philippine history.
12 December	General Santos	15	64+	Improvised Explosive Device	A bomb exploded in a market. Military intelligence sources concluded that Jemaah Islamiyah was responsible.

=== 2005 ===
Date	Location	Deaths	Injuries	Type	Description
14 February	Makati; Davao City; General Santos	4	40	Improvised Explosive Device	In the Valentine's Day bombings, three bomb attacks took place in Makati, Davao City and General Santos. Abu Sayyaf claimed responsibility.
21 April	Piagapo, Lanao del Sur	1	unknown	Hostage situation	Armed men abducted 19 passengers of a minibus and were held hostage for eight hours until being rescued by government forces, who lost one policeman in a skirmish.
28 August	Lamitan, Basilan	4	30+	Improvised Explosive Device	A homemade bomb left near the canteen of the ferry MV Dona Ramona exploded and engulfed the lower deck in fire as it sat at Lamitan wharf. Four people later died of their injuries.

=== 2006 ===
Date	Location	Deaths	Injuries	Type	Description
2 February	Patikul, Sulu	6	6+	Automatic weapons fire	Abu Sayyaf gunmen opened fire on a group of Christian farmers.
27 March	Jolo, Sulu	9	20+	Improvised Explosive Device	A homemade bomb exploded inside a convenience store owned by a Church-run cooperative.
23 June	Shariff Aguak, Maguindanao	6	9+	Vehicle Borne Improvised Explosive Device	A bomb planted in a van parked in front of a market exploded while Governor Datu Andal Ampatuan's convoy was passing by.
10 October	Tacurong, Sultan Kudarat	2	4+	Improvised Explosive Device	Main article: 2006 Central Mindanao bombings A bomb exploded in a market.
10 October	Makilala, Cotabato	6	42+	Improvised Explosive Device	Main article: 2006 Central Mindanao bombings A bomb exploded in front of the town hall. and injuring at least 42 others. The following day, another bomb was defused by the authorities nearby.

=== 2007 ===
Date	Location	Deaths	Injuries	Type	Description
10 January	General Santos; Kidapawan; Cotabato City	7	27+	Improvised Explosive Devices (3)	Three bombs exploded in cities across Mindanao ahead of the ASEAN summit in Manila. The first explosion destroyed a stand selling lottery tickets across the street from a market in General Santos. Three people died instantly and another three succumbed to their injuries in hospital, including two children. Another 22 civilians were wounded. A second explosion occurred in Kidapawan, as an improvised bomb placed near a police outpost exploded, injuring two male passers-by. A final blast occurred at a dump-site along a major street in Cotabato City, injuring 5.
17 April	Sulu	7	unknown	Hostage situation	Six road workers and one factory worker, kidnapped by Al-Qaeda-linked Abu Sayyaf militants while heading to a government road project, were found beheaded in Sulu.
8 May	Tacurong, Sultan Kudarat	8	33+	Improvised Explosive Device	A bomb exploded in a billiard hall and passenger terminal.
18 May	Cotabato City	3	~37	Improvised Explosive Device	A bomb, probably laid by Islamic extremists, exploded in a bus terminal.
13 November	Quezon City	6	11	Vehicle Borne Improvised Explosive Device	Main article: 2007 Batasang Pambansa bombing A vehicle bomb exploded near the south lobby of the main building of the Philippine House of Representatives killing Basilan congressman Wahab Akbar and legislative staff. Two other legislators were wounded.

=== 2008 ===
Date	Location	Deaths	Injuries	Type	Description
29 May	Zamboanga City	2	~21	Improvised Explosive Device	A bomb exploded outside a Philippine Air Force base where US soldiers, training local troops in anti-terrorism warfare, maintain a small camp. No group claimed responsibility for the attack.
24 July	Digos, Davao del Sur	3	~24	Improvised Explosive Device	A bomb exploded on board a bus parked at a terminal while on its way to Davao City from Bansalan, Davao del Sur.
29 July	Malabang, Lanao del Sur	4	unknown	Automatic weapons fire	Armed men stopped a mini-bus and murdered four Christian passengers execution-style, while a fifth passenger was unaccounted for, likely abducted.
1 September	Digos	7	34+	Improvised Explosive Device	Explosion on board a passenger bus. The blast was believed to have been connected to al-Khobar, an extortionist group that had threatened the bus company the week before the attack.
2 November	Linamon, Lanao del Norte	5	unknown	Automatic weapons fire	Suspected Christian Ilaga vigilantes ambushed a group of Muslim vacationers.
18 December	Iligan	3	~45	Improvised Explosive Device	Twin blasts in separate upscale malls in the main financial district in Aguinaldo Street.

=== 2009 ===
Date	Location	Deaths	Injuries	Type	Description
4 April	Isabela, Basilan	2	8+	Improvised Explosive Device	Blast near a Roman Catholic cathedral and a fast-food chain. No one claimed responsibility.
26 April	Lebak, Sultan Kudarat	1	3+	Improvised Explosive Device	A bomb exploded at a popular beach resort.
21 May	Zamboanga City	3	5	Automatic weapons fire	Unidentified gunmen on a motorcycle or motorcycles ambushed their truck in Victoria village.
3 June	Cotabato City	2	4+	Improvised Explosive Device	An unarmed soldier and a civilian were killed in an explosion that also injured four unarmed soldiers.
5 July	Cotabato City	6	45+	Improvised Explosive Device	Main article: 2009 Mindanao bombings A bomb exploded near a food stall across the street from the Roman Catholic Cathedral of the Immaculate Conception during Sunday Mass as a military truck drove by. The military laid the blame on rogue elements of the MILF, however, the group denied that they carried out the attack.
7 July	Jolo, Sulu	6	40+	Improvised Explosive Device	Main article: 2009 Mindanao bombings A bomb placed inside a motorcycle detonated outside a hardware store. Police discovered two other unexploded devices within a similar radius around the church.
7 July	Iligan	0	7+	Improvised Explosive Device	Main article: 2009 Mindanao bombings A few hours after the blast in Jolo, a bomb exploded in a car parked near a pawnshop.
17 September	Luuk, Sulu	2	15	Grenade	A grenade was hurled into a crowd at a late night carnival in the village of Tubig Puti.
29 September	Sulu	3	2	Improvised Explosive Device	A roadside bomb killed two US Navy members and a Philippine Marine, two other Filipino troops were injured.
20 October	Marawi, Lanao del Sur	1	21+	Improvised Explosive Device	A bomb planted inside city hall exploded during voter registration for the 2010 Philippine presidential election.
5 December	Jolo, Sulu	1	5	Improvised Explosive Device	A cell-phone triggered improvised bomb explosion leveled a police station and greatly damaged the municipal jail.

== 2010s ==
=== 2010 ===
Date	Location	Deaths	Injuries	Type	Description
27 February	Parang, Maguindanao	1	4+	Improvised explosive device	A boy was killed after an IED detonated under the van of an electoral candidate.
27 February	Maluso, Basilan	12	17	Automatic weapons and Grenade/RPG fire	Suspected Abu Sayyaf militants attacked a village.
15 March	Davao City	1	2+	Improvised Explosive Device	A soldier died after a truck carrying members of the Philippine Army was bombed by suspected New People's Army guerrillas while cruising along a road in the Paquibato district. Two soldiers were also hurt.
20 March	Antipolo, Rizal	4	5	Improvised Explosive Device	Four policemen were killed and five others were wounded in an ambush by NPA rebels.
12 April	Isabela, Basilan	14	many	Siege	At least 25 suspected Abu Sayyaf militants set off two bombs and opened fire on bystanders, killing three U.S. Marines, a policeman and six civilians and wounding many others. The bombings ignited gun battles around the city between rebels and security forces. Five militants also died in the attack.
23 June	Maluso, Basilan	4	6	Automatic weapons fire / Machete	Attack by about 30 hooded attackers, believed to be Abu Sayyaf militants, on a commuter jeep going home from Isabela to Maluso.
5 August	Zamboanga City	2	23	Improvised Explosive Device	A bomb exploded in a suitcase outside the terminal of Zamboanga International Airport, killing the carrier and a passer-by.
28 August	San Pascual, Masbate	5	unknown	Automatic weapons fire	A municipal councilor and four others, including two teenagers, were shot and killed in an ambush by at least 10 members of an unidentified armed group at Bolod village. No group claimed responsibility.
21 October	Matalam, Cotabato	10	9+	Improvised Explosive Device	Blast on board a bus travelling on a highway.
15 November	Carmen, Cotabato	1	2	Improvised Explosive Device	A bomb exploded at a passenger bus terminal.
15 December	Las Navas, Northern Samar	2	1+	Automatic weapons fire	Two civilians were killed in the ambush of a pump boat along the Hinaga River. Five soldiers and a civilian were reported missing as a result of the attack, which was believed to have been committed by NPA rebels.
25 December	Jolo, Sulu	0	11+	Improvised explosive device	A bomb exploded during Christmas Day Mass at a chapel inside a police camp, wounding a priest and 10 churchgoers, all of whom were civilians.

=== 2011 ===
Date	Location	Deaths	Injuries	Type	Description
25 January	Makati	5	13	Improvised Explosive Device	A bomb exploded on board a bus at the corner of EDSA and Buendia Avenue.
9 March	Jolo, Sulu	4	10	Improvised Explosive Device	A bomb detonated outside a primary school in San Raymundo village.
26 March	Tampakan, South Cotabato	3	1	Automatic weapons and grenade fire	Three construction workers were killed and another wounded in an ambush staged by NPA rebels on a convoy in the village of Danlag.
4 April	Mangudadatu, Maguindanao	11	3+	Automatic weapons fire / RPG fire	Up to 11 people, including relatives of Maguindanao Governor Esmael Mangudadatu, and an MILF rebel were killed in a clashes over a fishing ground.
6 April	Tungawan, Zamboanga Sibugay	3	1+	Automatic weapons fire	Three passengers on board a bus were killed and other passengers were robbed by four gunmen who later torched the vehicle.
26 June	Kidapawan	2	15	Improvised Explosive Device	Twin bomb blasts outside a canteen near a Catholic church and the second near a government building.
2 August	Cotabato City	2	9	Vehicle Borne Improvised Explosive Device	A bomb concealed in a motorcycle killed a woman and a boy as it detonated in front of a gun store.
23 October	Sumisip, Basilan	5	8	Automatic weapons fire	Four rubber tree tappers and one paramilitary escort were killed when a group of armed men ambushed their vehicle as it entered a cooperative in Sapak Bulak village.
27 November	Zamboanga City	3	27	Improvised Explosive Device	A bomb detonated in a budget hotel packed with wedding guests. The attack was blamed on Abu Sayyaf.

=== 2012 ===
Date	Location	Deaths	Injuries	Type	Description
24 January	Hadji Mohammad Ajul, Basilan	15	3	Automatic weapons fire	Three pump boats carrying unidentified gunmen ambushed a group of fishermen fishing in an artificial fish shelter (payao) near Sibago Island with assault rifles.
20 February	Kidapawan	3	15	Automatic weapons and Grenade/RPG fire	50 armed men raided the City Jail in an attempt to release Datukan Samad, a suspected member of the MILF.
23 February	Lapuyan, Zamboanga del Sur	6	14	Automatic weapons fire / Machete	At least 10 gunmen ambushed residents of Sitio Bihing, Barangay Tininghalang. The assailants were allegedly led by Amie Andi whose brother, Samang, had recently been arrested by police.
3 March	Jolo, Sulu	2	13	Improvised Explosive Device	A bomb planted by Abu Sayyaf detonated outside a grocery store.
10 April	Carmen, Cotabato	3	16	Improvised Explosive Device	A bomb detonated in a bus, killing a girl and two others.
5 May	Iligan	2	36	Grenade	A grenade was hurled into a crowd at a main thoroughfare.
11 July	Sumisip, Basilan	6	21	Automatic weapons fire / Grenade	A vehicle carrying rubber plantation workers was ambushed by Abu Sayyaf militants.
10 October	Cagayan de Oro	2	2	Improvised Explosive Device	A bomb detonated outside a hotel. A second explosive was found underneath a parked news vehicle.
14 December	Davao City	1	0	Improvised Explosive Device	A Malaysian member of Jemaah Islamiyah was shot dead by a S.W.A.T team sniper outside the Apo View Hotel in Poblacion District, after he had threatened to detonate an IED made from a 60-millimeter mortar round when confronted by police.

=== 2013 ===
Date	Location	Deaths	Injuries	Type	Description
22 April	Nunungan, Lanao del Norte	13	10	Automatic weapons and Grenade/RPG fire	Gunmen opened fire on a truck carrying Mayor Abdulmalik Manamparan and his supporters as they traveled home from a campaign event on a remote mountain road.
25 April	Guindulungan, Maguindanao	1	1	Improvised Explosive Device	Sanlindatu Rajamuda, the village chief of Macasampen, was killed and his son severely injured by a bomb blast as they boarded a vehicle.
11 May	Kadingilan, Bukidnon	4	unknown	Automatic weapons and Grenade/RPG fire	NPA rebels ambushed the convoy of mayor Joelito Jacosalem Talaid, wounding him and killing four of his bodyguards.
27 May	Allacapan, Cagayan	7	7	Improvised Explosive Device / Automatic weapons fire	NPA rebels ambushed a truck carrying members of the Philippine National Police elite Special Action Force.
26 July	Cagayan de Oro	6	45	Improvised Explosive Device	A bomb exploded at a restaurant packed with doctors and pharmaceutical salesmen at the Rosario Arcade, Limketkai Mall.
5 August	Cotabato City	8	40	Car bomb	Car bombing outside a funeral home along Sinsuat Avenue. It is the worst such attack in Cotabato City. It was initially suspected that the attack may have targeted Cynthia Guiani-Sayadi, city administrator, who had been receiving death threats, however, she was not harmed. Additional bombs were found later that week, which were believed to be connected to the incident. They were deactivated before they could cause damage.
17 September	Davao City	0	5	Improvised Explosive Device	Two bombs exploded in two malls.

=== 2014 ===
Date	Location	Deaths	Injuries	Type	Description
16 September	General Santos	1	7	Improvised Explosive Device	A bomb exploded at the Rizal Park Monument in the front of city hall.
9 December	Maramag, Bukidnon	11	43	Improvised Explosive Device	A bus in front of the Central Mindanao University along Sayre Highway in Sitio Musuan, Barangay Dologon, was blown up.

=== 2015 ===
Date	Location	Deaths	Injuries	Type	Description
22 September	Samal, Davao del Norte	2	0	armed kidnapping	Armed men abducted four people from the Holiday Oceanview resort on Samal Island. They were taken to Jolo, where two (Canadians Robert Hall and John Ridsdel) were beheaded.
1 October	Isabela, Basilan	4	6	bombing	Unknown militants placed an explosive device on a motorcycle taxi and detonated it at a convoy of Vice Mayor Abdubaki Ajibon. The blast killed his driver, another passenger and two pedestrians. Abu Sayyaf was suspected in the attack.
24 December	Tukuran, Zamboanga del Sur	7+	unknown	raid	150 militants from Bangsamoro Islamic Freedom Fighters (BIFF) raided the town, abducting and killing Christian farmers.

=== 2016 ===
Date	Location	Deaths	Injuries	Type	Description
9 April	Tipo-Tipo, Basilan	18	52	bombing	Main article: Battle of Tipo-Tipo At least 18 soldiers were killed and 52 injured in clashes with Abu Sayyaf militants and allied gunmen.
14 July	Mamasapano, Maguindanao	3	0	shooting	Three Marines were killed by gunmen while they were procuring provisions.
16 July	Mamasapano, Maguindanao	(+8)	7	shooting	Eight BIFF militants were killed while seven soldiers were wounded in hostilities sparked by an attack on an Army team studying Moro culture.
2 September	Davao City	15	70	Improvised Explosive Device	Main article: 2016 Davao City bombing A bomb exploded at a night market. Abu Sayyaf reportedly claimed responsibility before backtracking and blaming the Daulat Ul-Islamiya for the incident. Disgruntled vendors were also suspected.
18 November	Jolo, Sulu	4 (+12)	9	shooting	Four soldiers were killed by Abu Sayyaf militants. 12 militants were also killed.
26-30 November	Butig, Lanao del Sur	0 (+63)	30 (+17)	Siege	Main article: 2016 Butig clashes The Maute Group briefly seized control of the town before government forces killed at least 63 militants and recaptured the town.
28 December	Hilongos, Leyte	0	33	Bombing	Main article: 2016 Hilongos bombings Two bombs exploded during an amateur boxing match.

=== 2017 ===
Date	Location	Deaths	Injuries	Type	Description
10 January	Zamboanga City	8	0	shooting	Eight fishermen were killed in an attack by suspected Abu Sayyaf militants.
26 March	Sulu	4	23	grenade attack	Abu Sayyaf grenade attack.
11-22 April	Inabanga, Bohol,	6(+8)	0	shooting	Main article: 2017 Bohol clashes Abu Sayyaf members launched an incursion in Central Visayas. Three soldiers, a policeman, two civilians and four militants were killed during an April 11 firefight. Four more militants were killed on April 22.
23 May	Marawi, Lanao del Sur	N/A	N/A	Siege	Main article: Siege of Marawi Islamic State-inspired militants seized the city and fought government soldiers for five months in urban warfare conditions.
5 July	Basilan	2	0	kidnapping, execution	Abu Sayyaf militants beheaded two Vietnamese sailors held hostage for eight months.
13 July	Patikul, Sulu,	1	0	execution	The bullet-riddled body of a Vietnamese national was recovered in Barangay Buhanginan.
30 July	Basilan	7	0	Kidnapping, beheading	Seven loggers kidnapped by Abu Sayyaf on 20 July were found beheaded in two separate towns.
5 August	Datu Saudi Ampatuan, Maguindanao	5	3	landmine blast	Five MILF guerrillas were killed by a land mine while pursuing BIFF militants operating in the area.
18 August	Mindanao	5	0	shooting	Five fighters from the MILF died in a clash with BIFF militants.
21 August	Maluso, Basilan	9	16	shooting	Abu Sayyaf bandits attacked a village.
29 August	Sulu	3（+4）	1+（+2）	shooting	Three members of a Muslim clan were killed in a battle with the Abu Sayyaf group. Four ASG members were also killed.

=== 2018 ===
Date	Location	Deaths	Injuries	Type	Description
31 July	Lamitan, Basilan	11	5	bombing	2018 Lamitan bombing: Eleven persons, including three women, five CAFGU members, one soldier, one child, and the van driver, were killed when a van with an improvised explosive device (IED) exploded in a military checkpoint.
28 August	Isulan, Sultan Kudarat	3	36	bombing	2018 Isulan bombings: A parked motorcycle armed with an IED exploded along a Highway during the Hamungaya Festival. The BIFF claimed the responsibility for the incident.
2 September	Isulan, Sultan Kudarat	2	14	bombing	2018 Isulan bombings: A bomb exploded at an internet café.

=== 2019 ===
Date	Location	Deaths	Injuries	Type	Description
27 January	Jolo, Sulu	20	102	bombing	2019 Jolo Cathedral bombings: Two explosions inside and outside Jolo Cathedral during mass. The attack was believed to have been carried out by Jamaah Ansharut Daulah and Abu Sayyaf.
3 April	Isulan, Sultan Kudarat	0	5	bombing	An explosion hit a restaurant.
28 June	Jolo, Sulu	8	22	bombing	One of two suspected bombers detonated an explosive while being checked prior to entry at a military camp. The other suspect dashed inside and was shot, but was still able to detonate his explosive. An Abu Sayyaf faction led by Hatib Hajan Sawadjaan was the main suspect.
7 September	Isulan, Sultan Kudarat	0	7	bombing	A blast hit a bakery.
8 September	Indanan, Sulu	1	0	bombing	A foreign-looking female suicide bomber dressed in an abaya was killed after exploding a bomb while attempting to attack a military detachment.

== 2020s ==
=== 2020 ===
Date	Location	Deaths	Injuries	Type	Description
24 August	Jolo, Sulu	15	80	Vehicle and suicide bombing	Main article: 2020 Jolo bombings A motorcycle bomb placed next to a military truck detonated outside a market. An hour later, a female suicide bomber approached the cordoned-off area and detonated herself. Abu Sayyaf claimed responsibility.

=== 2021 ===
Date	Location	Deaths	Injuries	Type	Description
26 January	South Upi, Maguindanao	1	1	IED	A roadside bomb believed to have been planted by the BIFF exploded, killing a motorist and injuring his companion.
27 January	Tulunan, Cotabato	1	5	IED	A bomb exploded along a highway as a bus was passing by, killing a bystander.
12 April	Tipo-Tipo, Basilan	0	2	IED	A soldier and a civilian were injured in the explosion of a bomb believed to have been planted by Abu Sayyaf militants.
3 June	M'lang, Cotabato	3	6	Arson	A group of men boarded a bus and torched the vehicle with the passengers still inside using gasoline.

=== 2022 ===
Date	Location	Deaths	Injuries	Type	Description
11 January	Aleosan, Cotabato	1	6	IED	A bomb planted on a bus exploded, killing a child.
24 April	Parang, Maguindanao	0	3	IED	A bomb exploded inside a parked bus during a stopover, injuring passengers on board.
26 May	Koronadal, South Cotabato; Tacurong, Sultan Kudarat	0	1	IED	A bomb exploded on a bus in Koronadal, wounding a passenger, followed by another in a vacant lot in Tacurong.
6 November	Tacurong, Sultan Kudarat	1	11	IED	A bomb planted inside a bus killed and wounded several passengers.

=== 2023 ===
Date	Location	Deaths	Injuries	Type	Description
17 April	Isulan, Sultan Kudarat	0	7	IED	A bomb exploded inside a passenger bus parked at a public terminal.
3 December	Marawi, Lanao del Sur	4	40	IED	A bomb exploded during a Mass at the gym of Mindanao State University.

=== 2024 ===
Date	Location	Deaths	Injuries	Type	Description
19 May	Cotabato City	0	2	Grenade	A grenade was thrown at a chapel during a Mass in Barangay Rosary Heights 3.

=== 2026 ===
Date	Location	Deaths	Injuries	Type	Description
22 June	Tacloban	3	20	School shooting	Main article: 2026 Tacloban school shooting Two students, both minors, opened fire inside San Jose National High School before being arrested. A subsequent investigation found that they had been radicalized online by the 764 organization, known for its nihilistic violent extremism (NVE).

== See also ==
- Insurgency in the Philippines
- Moro conflict
- War on terror
- Terrorism in the Philippines
