= Maute =

Maute may refer to:

- Maute group, an Islamist group in the Philippines
- Frederick I, Count of Zollern, nicknamed Maute, Swabian Count

== People with the surname ==
- Abdullah Maute (died 2017), Filipino Islamist, brother of Omar
- Kurt Maute (born 1965), German engineer
- Matthias Maute (born 1963), German recorder player and composer
- Omar Maute (1980–2017), Filipino Islamist, brother of Abdullah

== See also ==
- Mautes, a French commune
- Mauthe
