= 2019 Sulu bombings =

2019 Sulu bombings may refer to:

- 2019 Jolo Cathedral bombings, in January
- 2019 Indanan bombings, in June
