= Lanao del Sur's 2nd district =

Lanao del Sur's 2nd district may refer to:

- Lanao del Sur's 2nd congressional district, one of two congressional districts in Lanao del Sur represented in the House of Representatives of the Philippines
- Lanao del Sur's 2nd parliamentary district, one of nine parliamentary districts in Lanao del Sur represented in the Bangsamoro Parliament
