= Maute Group =

Philippine Islamist militant group

Islamic State of Lanao
- دولة لاناو الإسلامية
- The flag of IS, adopted by Islamic State of Lanao after swearing allegiance to ISIL
- Other name: Islamic State of Lanao; IS Ranao; Maute Group (until 2019)
- Leaders: Owayda Benito Marohombsar a.k.a. Abu Dar (KIA); Omar Maute (KIA); Abdullah Maute (KIA); Amin Bacu (KIA); Amerol Mangoranca (KIA)
- Dates active: 2013–present (disputed)
- Split from: Moro Islamic Liberation Front
- Country: Philippines
- Active regions: Lanao del Sur and Maguindanao del Sur
- Ideology: Salafi jihadism
- Part of: Islamic State

The Islamic State of Lanao, (Note: Arabic: دولة لاناو الإسلامية) commonly referred to as Dawlah Islamiyah and formerly known as the Maute Group ([mɐʔutɪ] or [mɐʔute̞]), is a radical Islamist group composed of former Moro Islamic Liberation Front (MILF) guerrillas and foreign fighters. Based in Lanao del Sur, it was founded by brothers Abdullah and Omar Maute. The organization, which also operated a protection racket in the municipality of Butig, clashes on several occasions with the Armed Forces of the Philippines, the most significant of which began in May 2017 and culminated in the siege of Marawi.

It is listed as a terrorist organization by the Philippines, Malaysia and New Zealand. As of today, Maute Group is still active, but some sources state that the militant group may have dissolved in May 2026.

== History ==
=== Origin ===
The group, originally known as Dawlah Islamiya, (Note: Arabic: دولة إسلامية) was founded in 2012 by brothers Abdullah Maute and Omar Maute who were described by a source as "petty criminals" at the time. However, other sources have described the Maute family as wealthy and politically-connected. The matriarch, Ominta Romato Maute, also known as Farhana Maute, owns property in Mindanao and Manila, and runs a construction business. She is related to politicians in Butig, Lanao del Sur, and is considered influential. She has been described as the financier of the Maute group's activities, providing logistics and recruiting fighters. Because of the involvement of the entire Maute family, the rise of the Maute Group is described as the rise of family terrorism in the Philippines.

Butig, the headquarters of the Maute group, is also a stronghold of the Moro Islamic Liberation Front and both groups are tied by blood or marriage. Abdullah and Omar Maute are first cousins of Azisa Romato, the wife of the late MILF Vice Chairman for Military Affairs Alim Abdul Aziz Mimbantas, who is buried in Butig. The Maute brothers themselves were once members of the MILF.

=== Early clashes with Philippine security forces ===
Philippine Army sources state that their initial encounter with the Maute group involved a firefight in 2013 when the insurgents attacked a security checkpoint the government troops were manning in Madalum, Lanao del Sur. The group was thought to have over 100 members then and were supplied with equipment by a foreign terrorist. They are said to be affiliated with Jemaah Islamiyah, a Southeast Asian Islamist terrorist group.

The group was involved in a clash with Philippine Army troops in February 2016 that led to the capture of their headquarters in Butig, Lanao del Sur. It was initially reported that Omar Maute was killed in the clash. However, it was later confirmed that he escaped alive, as he was later seen in a video footage found on a cellphone captured by Philippine government troops during the Battle of Marawi. In November 2016, the Maute group seized the town of Butig, but were dislodged from their positions by Philippine security forces after about a week of fighting.

CNN has reported that two officers of the Philippine National Police had defected and joined the group.

=== Declaration of allegiance to Islamic State ===
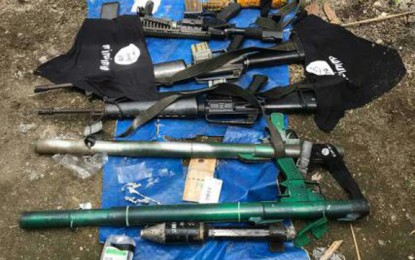
Weapons and other paraphernalia allegedly owned by members of the Maute group; confiscated by the Philippine Army in July 2018

The group pledged allegiance to the Islamic State in April 2015, along with the Ansar Khalifa Philippines terrorist organization, vowing to provide support for each other. However, according to former National Security Council senior consultant Ashley Acedillo, there are no indications that ISIS ever acknowledged the Maute group's pledge.

Although some reports indicate that the Maute group is regularly seen carrying black flags bearing the insignia of the Islamic State of Iraq and Syria, Butig town mayor Ibrahim Macadato has stated that the group is not affiliated with ISIS, but are merely armed residents. However, training manuals and other documents for militants under the Islamic State were recovered from their captured camp, indicating that the group may be trying to link up with ISIS.

A regional security expert in October 2016 stated that the Maute group was sophisticated in its use of social media and was able to attract students and teachers from the Mindanao State University in Marawi. This attracted various Wahhabi adherents in the Philippines to join their group.

=== Rising terrorist activities ===
As ISIS suffers setbacks in Syria and Iraq, experts warn that hundreds of fighters from Indonesia and Malaysia will return to look for new opportunities to take the fight elsewhere, and the Maute group's pledge of loyalty to ISIS could serve as an incentive to join ranks with the organization. Since at least 2016, reports on jihadist activities in the Philippines and of Filipino fighters with ISIS indicate an increasing degree of coordination, cooperation, and cohesion between Southeast Asian jihadist militants and the Islamic State in Syria and Iraq.

The Maute group is said to be actively recruiting minors for service as "child warriors" and using the non-passage of the Bangsamoro Basic Law as propaganda. In April 2016, they abducted six sawmill workers from Butig, two of whom were later found beheaded. The group is also suspected of being behind a failed bomb plot in close proximity to the US embassy in Manila in November 2016.

=== Davao City bombing ===
On October 4, 2016, three men linked to the Maute group were arrested in connection with the 2016 Davao City bombing. The men were TJ Tagadaya Macabalang, Wendel Apostol Facturan, and Musali Mustapha. Defence Secretary Delfin Lorenzana said that the Maute group had established links with the Abu Sayyaf and that there are "indications" that the group is aligning themselves with ISIS. On November 28, the Philippine government finally officially acknowledged that Maute is linked to ISIS in a live televised comment by former President Rodrigo Duterte who also revealed the financing of the Davao City bombing by illegal drug money indicating the presence of narcoterrorism in the Philippines.

=== Battle of Marawi ===
On May 23, 2017, the Maute group attacked Marawi City and later besieged by the Armed Forces of the Philippines. The attack resulted in the destruction of homes, the deaths and wounding of soldiers, policemen, and civilians, torching of a mosque, and a hospital being overrun. The former leader of Abu Sayyaf, Isnilon Hapilon was seen with the group during the attack. The attack resulted in President Duterte declaring a state of martial law across the entire island of Mindanao with the possibility that it be expanded nationwide.

Majority of the evacuees and refugees have been housed in different barangays in Iligan. On June 1, 2017, Iligan Mayor Celso G. Regencia issued an order to the residents, who legally possessed firearms, to shoot terrorists who trespass their properties.

==== Killing of the Maute brothers ====
Omar Maute was killed by the Armed Forces of the Philippines on October 16, 2017, along with former Abu Sayyaf chief Isnilon Hapilon. The group was later declared "practically wiped out" by the armed forces following the deaths of the seven Maute brothers. While the public was told not to worry about the group for now, younger members of the group might assume leadership.

=== After the Battle of Marawi ===
Remnants of the group were reportedly recruiting new members around Marawi in December 2017. The successor group has been labeled as the "Turaifie group" after its purported leader, Abu Turaifie. Abu Turaifie is the alias of Esmail Sheikh Abdulmalik, the leader of Jamaatul Muhaajireen Wal Ansar, a faction which split from the Bangsamoro Islamic Freedom Fighters. In May 2018, the Philippine military alleged that Owayda Benito Marohomsar (a.k.a. Abu Dar) was now the leader of the group. He had fled with dozens of Maute fighters during the Battle of Marawi and has since been active in recruiting new members using money looted from a local bank and the abandoned homes of wealthy residents.

=== Decline ===
On 24 January 2019, a fierce gunfight between security forces of the 103rd Infantry Battalion and terrorists of the Maute group left three soldiers injured and three terrorists injured in Barangay Sumalindao, Sultan Dumalondong, Lanao del Sur. Days earlier five militants surrendered to military near a military base in Lanao del Sur.

On 12 March, two IS-militants and two Philippine soldiers were killed and one soldier was injured during a gunfight in Pagayawan, Lanao del Sur. The attack was blamed on the Dawlah Islamiyah Ranao, a remnant of the Maute-Abu Sayaff Group that led the siege of Marawi in May 2017. Days later on the 14 March four IS-linked Maute followers and three soldiers were killed while three other troops were missing following an intense firefight in barangay Dinaigan, Tubaran, Lanao del Sur, military officials said Friday. After the speculation of the death of the leader of this group a DNA test released in April confirmed that Maute leader Owayda Marohomsar, alias Abu Dar, was one of the four terrorists killed.

On 19 June, a Pakistani member called Waqar Ahmad, 36, was arrested and later deported. Morente said Ahmad was to undergo deportation proceedings for being an undesirable alien due to his alleged terrorist links and for working in the country without a permit. He was arrested after several days of intensive surveillance conducted by members of the PNP Regional Intelligence Unit 9 at the appliance store of his Pakistani uncle in the said city. The authorities suspect that the group planned to make an attack similar to the 2019 Indanan bombings. On 21 June, an Indonesian militant who fought alongside the Maute Group during the rebels siege of Marawi in 2017. The Taguig Regional Trial Court (RTC) Branch 266 has found Muhammad Ilham Syahputra guilty of the illegal possession of a handgun when he was arrested on November 1, 2017.

=== Resurgence ===
Dawlah Islamiyah insurgency
- Part of the ISIL insurgency in the Philippines, war on terror and War against the Islamic State
| Date | 2023–present |
| Location | Bangsamoro region (mainly Lanao del Sur and Maguindanao del Sur), Philippines |
| Status | Ongoing |

Belligerents
| Philippines; MILF | Islamic State |

Commanders and leaders
| (Philippines) Bongbong Marcos (Philippines) Gilbert Teodoro (Philippines) Romeo Brawner Jr. (Philippines) Murad Ebrahim | Nasser Daud †; Khadafi Mimbesa †; Abu Zacharia † (Islamic State) Amerol Mangoranca † |

Units involved
| Armed Forces of the Philippines | Dawlah Islamiyah; Dawlah Islamiya-Hassan faction; (Islamic State) Bangsamoro Islamic Freedom Fighters |

Strength
| ≈2,000 soldiers | Unknown |

Casualties and losses
| 14 soldiers killed, 12+ injured 1 police officer injured 9 MILF members killed | 68 killed |
- 11 civilians killed, 50+ injured 1 former Dawlah Islamiya militant killed in retaliation by the group

In 2023, the group had a resurgence and took up the name Dawlah Islamiyah, and the Philippine government announced that militants who survived were reorganizing to revive the group. On March 21, two militants were killed and four injured during a ground and air operation in Maguindanao del Sur and Cotabato. A police operation was carried out against the group on April 2 in Bubong, Lanao del Sur. Three militants were killed and seven arrested, while an officer was wounded. Sixteen days later, another gunman was killed by the army in an encounter in Pagayawan.

Between 2020 and 2022, at least 39 militants, six soldiers, three police officers and a number of civilians were killed, mainly during army's operations aimed at capturing surviving members of the group.

On April 18, Dawlah Islamiyah and Bangsamoro Islamic Freedom Fighters militants carried out a bombing attack on a bus in Isulan, Sultan Kudarat, wounding seven civilians.

Between June and December 2023, twenty-one senior members of the group were killed during security operations in Mindanao. Several commanders were among those killed, including leader Abu Zacharia. On October 29, 2023, senior commander Samaon Odin Amil accidentally killed himself after a home-made bomb prematurely exploded in Datu Salibo. A soldier was killed and three injured during an operation in June.

On September 11, the Moro Islamic Liberation Front clashed with Dawlah Islamiyah gunmen in Barangay Tuawayan, killing two of them. A one-month-old boy died during evacuations of civilians amid the fight.

Eleven of the slain militants were killed by the 6th Infantry Division on December 3, 2023, including Alandoni Macadaya Lucsadatu, suspected to be a leader. He was involved in the killing of a former militant who surrendered to authorities. Sixteen hours later, a bomb exploded during a Catholic Mass at the gymnasium of Mindanao State University in Marawi, killing four people and injuring several more. The Islamic State claimed responsibility for the attack. It was suspected that the attack was carried out by Dawlah Islamiyah in retaliation for the killing of their militants.

Between December 7 and 9, a joint operation between the army and the Moro Islamic Liberation Front in Dalgan, executed by air and ground attacks, killed nine militants and wounded ten more. Eight Moro Islamic Liberation Front members were killed during the shootouts. Dawlah Islamiyah gunmen also killed five civilians in Pagalungan before fleeing on riverboats. On December 7, they also carried out another attack in Pagalungan, killing a Bangsamoro commander and burning civilian homes, killing an infant. Dawlah Islamiyah carried out the attacks after blaming the Bangsamoro for the military offensives against them.

On January 3, 2024, two army intelligence operatives were killed during an ambush in Munai while gathering informations about suspects involved in the university's bombing. Nine militants were killed by the military in Piagapo on January 26, 2024, during a hunting on the alleged mastermind of the Mindanao University's attack. The operation resulted in the killing of leader Khadafi Mimbesa, Saumay Saiden, alleged mastermind in the university's bombing, and Abdul Hadi, who assembled the device used in the attack. Three other militants were killed in encounters days later. A gunfight erupted on February 18, 2024, in Barangay Ramain, which resulted in the killing of six soldiers and three militants. Three other soldiers were injured. Two days later, the group carried out a grenade attack against a military base in Aguak, Maguindanao del Sur, wounding three soldiers.

On February 26, three other militants were killed and three soldiers injured in Barangay Matampay during a pursuit operation against seven militants who managed to flee during the February 18 firefight.

On March 17, 2024, ten Dawlah Islamiyah gunmen carried out an ambush against the military from the 40th Infantry Battalion on the highway of Tuayan 1 in Datu Hoffer Ampatuan, Maguindanao del Sur. Four soldiers were killed.

Three militants were killed and a soldier was injured during a shootout in Lanao del Norte on April 13, 2024.

On April 29, units from the 103rd Infantry Brigade engaged twelve militants led by leader Nasser Daud in a 45-minute firefight in Barangay Cadayonan in Munai, Lanao del Norte. Three militants were killed and two soldiers injured. A second encounter later erupted in Barangay Maganding, also in Munai town, during the pursuit of escaped militants, in which two more militants were killed and a soldier was injured. Daud escaped from the scene.

On May 24, 2024, two militants wanted for high-profile crimes were killed during a shootout with security forces in Barangay Talcon. On July 20, a military vehicle was ambushed by twenty militants, resulting in a shootout in which a soldier was killed and another wounded.

On June 3, 2025, seven members of the Dawlah Islamiyah group surrendered in the hinterlands of Upi, Maguindanao del Norte.

On June 24, 2025, government forces arrested an alleged bomb-making expert of the Dawlah Islamiyah following a clash in Sultan Kudarat, Maguindanao del Norte.

On March 8, 2026, the Dawlah Islamiyah-Hassan faction’s "emir" was killed in an encounter near Barangay Tinimbacan, Banisilan, Cotabato.

On April 17, 2026, ten Dawlah Islamiyah militants, including a leader, are killed in a shootout during a raid in Marantao, Lanao del Sur.
