= Mindanao State University bombing =

Islamic State mass murder in the Philippines

- Part of ISIL insurgency in the Philippines and Moro Conflict
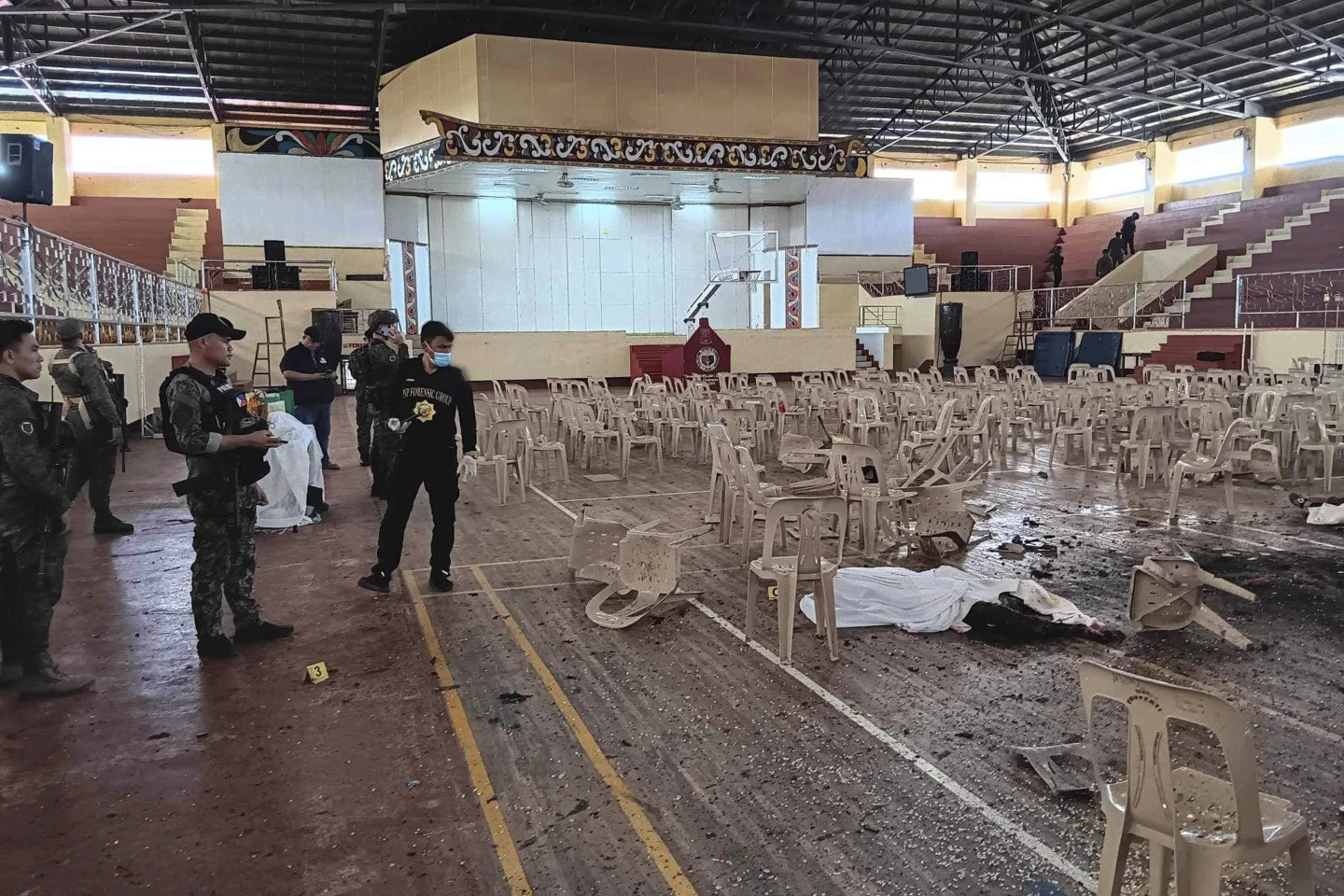
- Law enforcement investigating the site of the bombing

- Marawi (Philippines)
- Location: 7°59′41.0″N 124°15′24.8″E; Marawi, Philippines
- Date: December 3, 2023 (PST)
- Target: Christians
- Attack type: terrorism
- Weapon: 60-mm mortar shell
- Deaths: 4
- Injuries: 72 (Note: Number of injured reportedly is at 50 as of December 8. This conflicts with figures by the Office of Civil Defense, which recorded the number of injured at 72 on December 5. The local disaster risk reduction management office also list the same figures as of December 12.)
- Perpetrator: Islamic State: Maute group
- Motive: Islamic extremism

On December 3, 2023, an Islamist bombing occurred during a Catholic Mass at the gymnasium of Mindanao State University in Marawi, Philippines, killing four people.

== Background ==
Marawi is a Muslim-majority city in Lanao del Sur in Bangsamoro, an autonomous region in Mindanao in the southern Philippines, a country whose population is predominantly Catholic. In 2017, over 1,100 people were killed in a five-month siege between Islamic State-affiliated insurgents and the Armed Forces of the Philippines (AFP) in Marawi.

Mindanao State University is a government-run higher education institution in Marawi. There is a small chapel within the campus but it is not capable of accommodating churchgoers during Sunday, hence they usually held the Catholic Sunday Masses at the school's gymnasium. As a state university, the military and police were not permitted to deploy personnel within the university campus prior to the incident. Unlike typical universities, MSU's campus which spans seven barangays is unfenced.

== Bombing ==
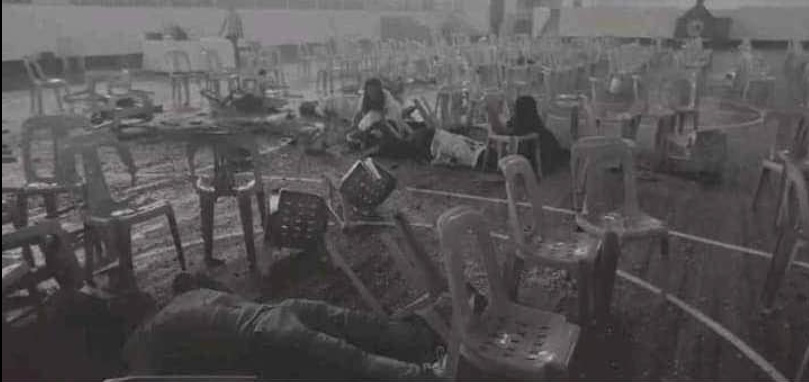
The bombing site inside the Dimaporo gymnasium

On December 3, 2023 at around 7:30 a.m., during a Mass being conducted at the Dimaporo Gymnasium of Mindanao State University in Marawi, an improvised explosive device detonated after the Kyrie portion. There were around 72 attendees of the Mass, which was presided by Franciscan priest Benigno Flores Jr., who survived the incident.

The explosion killed four people and injured at least 50 others. Of the fatalities, two were college professors and two were students. Police said that the bombing was not a suicide attack. An eyewitness reportedly saw a man placing a bag believed to contain the bomb, while CCTV footage showed the two suspected bombers arriving at the gymnasium on a motorcycle at around 7:03 a.m. and stood there for eight minutes. The explosion produced a crater in the gymnasium floor. ABS-CBN reported that the IED, which was composed of a 60mm mortar round and an RPG high-explosive anti-personnel MEUG, had been concealed in a black tote bag.

Authorities said that a bomb threat was circulated the night before the incident. The sender threatened to bomb Marawi but did not specify their target.

The incident has been compared with the 2019 Jolo Cathedral bombings.

== Perpetrators ==
On the same day of the bombing, Islamic State (IS) claimed responsibility. The claim of the international group is being validated. Other groups suspected are IS-affiliate Maute Group and the Abu Sayyaf.

It was speculated that the bombing was a retaliation against the Philippine government. State forces have killed 21 members of the Dawlah Islamiyah group since June 2023. Two days before the bombing, 11 members of the Dawlah Islamiya were killed in clashes with the Philippine Army in Datu Hoffer Ampatuan, Maguindanao del Sur, while Abu Sayyaf leader and Dawlah Islamiyah central committee member Mudzrimar Sawadjaan was killed in a separate clash with government forces in Basilan a day before the attack.

Authorities also reached out to Muslim leaders and security analysts for the bombings link to the Gaza war. The consensus is that the incident is unrelated but the government is not discounting this angle.

The Philippine National Police (PNP) identified two "persons of interest" in relation to the bombing. Both reside in Lanao del Sur. They are Arseni Lumen Membisa and Wahab Sandigan Macabayao from the Dawlah Islamiyah group and are also members of the Maute Group. Membisa, also known as "Lapitos", was identified as the one who drove to motorcycle used to transport the bomb, while another suspected Maute member and explosives expert, Kadapi Mimbesa also known as "Engineer", was believed to have planted the bomb inside the gymnasium after he was identified by an attendee of the mass. Mimbesa was subsequently identified by university faculty and officials as having enrolled twice at the school, each time failing to finish his studies. Both Membisa and Mimbesa were also believed to have been involved in previous bombings in Lanao del Norte and Lanao del Sur and were also facing murder charges. Two more people were tagged as persons of interest, while police said that there were two lookouts working for the attackers.

On December 6, Jafar Gamo Sultan, one of the suspects, was arrested in Marawi. He was allegedly the companion of the person who placed the bomb identified by eyewitness as "Omar". On December 9, two more suspects only referred to as "Maausor" and "Monatanda/Titing" were arrested in Lumbayanague, where Mimbesa was said to have fled. The two are also alleged members of the Dawlah Islamiyah group.

On January 26, 2024, Omar was killed along with eight other Dawlah Islamiyah members in a firefight with the Philippine Army in the highlands of Piagapo, Lanao del Sur. Authorities said Membisa and another suspect in the bombing known as "Khatab" were also seen in the fighting but were not identified as being among the dead. The AFP later confirmed on February 12 that Membisa had been killed the firefight, citing information from a surrendered militant.

On October 16, 2024, Membisa, the last known suspect in the bombing, was arrested in a joint PNP-AFP operation in Iligan.

== Reactions ==
=== Domestic ===
==== Mindanao State University ====
Following the bombing, university president Basari Mapupuno released a memorandum stating that classes and extracurricular activities in the school were suspended from December 4 until further notice; as a result, students, faculty, and personnel were repatriated to their home provinces. Around 600 students fled. Psychological interventions were also extended to students. The university admitted there were security lapses in the campus but said they were implementing measures to maintain safety. Students and alumni gathered at the Dimaporo gymnasium on December 5 to light candles for the victims. The following day, police personnel were deployed in the campus.

As per a December 7 memorandum, in-person classes would resume on December 11, which saw objection from the school's student council who were skeptical of the administration's assurance to guarantee campus safety. Hundred of students also launched a rally against the resumption of classes. The following day, examinations as well as the deadline for other requirements were postponed to January 2024.

==== Government ====
President Bongbong Marcos initially blamed foreign terrorists. Defense Secretary Gilbert Teodoro told a news conference there was a strong indication of a foreign element in the bombing.

The House of Representatives on December 6 adopted Resolution 1504 condemning the bombing as a terrorist attack.

Senator Ronald dela Rosa, on the prospect of declaring a "state of lawlessness" in Marawi, said that such declaration needs further study. House member for Lanao del Sur's 1st district, Zia Adiong advised that declaring martial law in the city would be counter-productive and cause "unnecessary panic". He also called on the government to reevaluate the use of funds in intelligence gathering. The Armed Forces of the Philippines said that no martial law is needed, insisting that it is on top of the situation.

The Philippine Senate held a closed-door meeting with security officials on December 6 regarding the bombing. Following the meeting, Senate President Migz Zubiri urged local officials to look into alleged radicalization efforts since the 2017 Marawi siege.

===== Law enforcement =====
The PNP and the AFP launched a joint operation with the assistance of other groups such as the Moro National Liberation Front and Moro Islamic Liberation Front to capture the suspects linked to the bombing. The PNP placed Mindanao under red alert, while Metro Manila was placed in heightened alert. The Philippine Coast Guard also imposed enhanced security and intelligence-gathering procedures following the bombing.

Both the PNP and AFP denied that there was a failure of intelligence, stating that they had warned stakeholders in Maguindanao, Lanao del Sur and Lanao del Norte of possible retaliatory attacks prior to the university bombing. Although on December 7, the AFP admitted there might be a failure "in a way". It added that whether its personnel is to be held accountable is yet to be determined.

The PNP raised security nationwide for the Christmas season. Leaves filed for after December 15 were suspended to ensure sufficient personnel.

===== Local governments =====
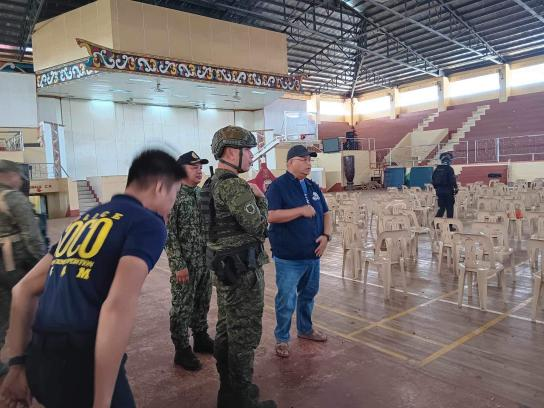
Lanao del Sur governor Mamintal Adiong Jr. inspects the bombing site

The Bangsamoro regional government condemned the incident's perpetrators as "atrocious and cowardly". Murad Ebrahim, the Chief Minister of Bangsamoro, pledged to shoulder the victims' medical treatment. Lanao del Sur governor Mamintal Adiong Jr. said his office had also shouldered financial assistance for the injured and pledged further assistance to those killed in the attack. Nearly a thousand students returned to their respective provinces following the blast, with various local government units arranging bus trips for them.

===== Other government agencies =====
The Commission on Higher Education urged all higher education institutions in the country to review their safety and security measures. The National Security Council pointed to the lack of security within the MSU campus as a factor to the bombing, with Assistant Director General Jonathan Malaya suggesting that MSU end its special arrangement that allows it to provide its own security and "coordinate" closely with the police and military.

==== Religious sector ====
The Catholic Bishops' Conference of the Philippines (CBCP) condemned the bombing which it noted coincided with the first Sunday of Advent. Archbishop emeritus of Cotabato Cardinal Orlando Quevedo called the bombing a "massacre" and a "terrorist attack" but urged for peace. The President of the CBCP, Pablo Virgilio David announced a day of mourning on December 6 for the victims of the bombing. Father Sebastiano D'Ambra, an Italian missionary priest who has been in the Philippines for decades and is heavily involved in Catholic-Muslim dialogue, through the Silsilah Dialogue Movement, lamented the fact that the attack had taken place on the first day of the Mindanao Week of Peace, saying: "What was meant to be a week full of positive peace-building moments has become a time of terror". He said it was necessary not to jump to conclusions about the motive of the attack, but expressed "no doubt that Christians were the target".

Pope Francis mentioned the attack during the weekly Angelus prayer, in Rome, saying: "I wish to assure my prayer for the victims of the attack that occurred this morning in the Philippines, where a bomb exploded during Mass. I am close to the families and the people of Mindanao, who have already suffered so much."

The United Imams of the Philippines said the incident was a violation of both "human and Islamic norms".

Muslim and Christian leaders issued a joint-statement called "Religions are for Peace" condemning the Marawi bombing as a deplorable act not justifiable under any religion and that they pledge to be "pro-active against similar terrorist acts" after an interfaith meeting from January 16 to 17, 2024.

=== International ===
Representatives from Australia, Canada, France, Israel, Japan, Singapore, South Korea, and the United States condemned the bombing. The European Union ambassador to the Philippines expressed grief over the incident. ASEAN called the bombing as a "heinous terrorist attack".

Pope Francis released a statement praying for the victims. The four people who died were included in the Vatican's New Martyrs catalogue which commemorates people who were "killed simply because they are Christians".

== Disinformation and hate speech ==
Non-government organization Council on Climate Conflict and Action Asia (CCCAA) expressed concern that the incident would be used to sow divisions between Christians and Muslims. Its Early Response Network noted an increased rate of hate speech. Among the content which circulated was a fake quote card posted in Facebook from an account named Fahima Salik tv attributing Bangsamoro Interior Minister Naguib Sinarimbo as saying that "the bombing happened because there is no place for Christians in Marawi". Sinarimbo denounced the misinformation stating that he and his ministry did not issue such a statement.

Police in Davao City dismissed claims that one of the perpetrators was allegedly spotted at the Davao City hall after the bombing as disinformation.

Controversies about politicians funding the attack spread widely across multiple social media platforms, especially Facebook. Conspiracy theorists blamed anonymous individuals and some eyewitnesses.

== See also ==
- List of terrorist incidents in 2023
- List of terrorist incidents in the Philippines
