= Mauthe =

Mauthe is a surname. Notable people with the name include:

- Carlton W. Mauthe (1907–1959), American politician and businessman
- Hal Mauthe (born c. 1929), Canadian football player
- Jörg Mauthe (1924–1986), Austrian writer, journalist and broadcasting executive
- Pete Mauthe (1890–1967), American football player

== See also ==
- Maute (disambiguation)
- Mauthe Doog
