= 2016 Butig clashes =

2016 armed conflicts in the Philippines

February 2016 Butig clash
- Part of the Moro conflict
Date	February 20 – March 1, 2016
Location	Butig, Lanao del Sur, Philippines 7.6957°N 124.2977°E
Status	Decisive Philippine victory

Belligerents
Philippines	Islamic State of Iraq and the Levant: Maute group

Commanders and leaders
Roseller Murillo; Gerrardo Barrientos Jr. (Philippines) Ibrahim Macadato	Omar Maute; Abdullah Maute

Units involved
Armed Forces of the Philippines: Philippine Army; 1st Infantry Division; 103rd Infantry Brigade; 51st Infantry Battalion	Unknown

Strength
≈2,000 soldiers	60+ militants

Casualties and losses
5 killed 7 wounded	55 killed (Philippine army estimate)
- 30,000+ displaced

The 2016 Butig clashes were armed conflicts that began on February 20, 2016, between the Philippine Army and a group of Moro insurgent sympathizers of ISIS and Jemaah Islamiyah led by the Maute group in Butig, Lanao del Sur, Philippines. Three Philippine Army soldiers were killed in action, 11 wounded, and 20 terrorists killed in the early phase of battle. 335 families fled to Marawi City and 657 families took refuge in Masiu.

== February 2016 clash ==
The Butig clashes began when a supposed "foreign and local terrorist organization" (FLTO), led by the Maute brothers, harassed the 51st Infantry Battalion, which had been manning a patrol base in Barangay Bayabao on February 20, 2016. Armored personnel carriers and troops were sent to Butig, while the military used two 520MG Defender helicopters to track down the armed men and conducted air strikes against them.

A lull in the fighting occurred that evening, but resumed at dawn the next. According to Armed Forces of the Philippines sources, the skirmishes between Army forces and the Maute group turned into a full blown military offensive with troops using artillery, gunships, and armored personnel carriers against the terrorists.

The Autonomous Region in Muslim Mindanao (ARMM) Office of Civil Defense stated that approximately 2000 individuals evacuated their homes to avoid getting caught in the crossfire. According to Armed Forces of the Philippines spokesman Brig. Gen. Restituto Padilla, three soldiers were killed and six others were wounded in the sporadic firefights.

== November 2016 clash ==
November 2016 Butig clash
- Part of the Moro conflict
Date	November 26, 2016 – November 30, 2016
Location	Butig, Lanao del Sur, Philippines
Status	Philippine government victory

Belligerents
Philippines; Moro Islamic Liberation Front (Relief aid)	Islamic State of Iraq and the Levant: Maute group

Units involved
Armed Forces of the Philippines: Philippine Army; Philippine National Police	Unknown

Strength
Unknown	200–300

Casualties and losses
no deaths 30 wounded	63 killed 17 wounded (Philippine Army source)
- 2,400 families displaced

On November 26, 2016, the Maute group, a militant organization which pledged allegiance to the Islamic State of Iraq and the Levant, occupied the town of Butig in Lanao del Sur.

The Maute group lost Camp Darul Iman in Butig to the Philippine military in June 2016. The November 2016 town seizure was reportedly in retaliation of an offensive launched by the Armed Forces of the Philippines.

The Maute group seized the town of Butig in November 26 reportedly with 200 militants. By the second day, the group now with about 300 armed men with grenade launchers have occupied the old town hall building where they replaced the Philippine flag hoisted there with the Black Standard flag used by ISIS. They had also occupied the mosque and the national high school situated inside the town center. All roads leading to Butig was closed to the public. The Tactical Command Post in Lanao has sent reinforcements to aid Philippine soldiers fighting the Maute fighters in Butig. SF-260 trainer planes also dropped 150 pounds (68 kg) bomb in the occupied town center.

The Moro Islamic Liberation Front is reportedly coordinating with the government in dealing with the evacuees who fled from the town due to the clash.

By the third day, most of the 17,000 residents of the Muslim-majority town has been evacuated to neighboring municipalities. The old municipal hall was also recaptured by government forces.

Meanwhile, during the operation, suspected Maute Group members planted an IED outside the US embassy in Manila, and detonated another in a PSG and military convoy in Marawi that acts as vanguard party for President Duterte's visit in Marawi and Butig, wounding 7 PSG personnel and 2 soldiers.

The offensive by government forces ended on November 30, 2016, with the military saying that the town was deserted and that surviving Maute militants are retreating to the mountains.
