= Ansar Khalifa Philippines =

Philippine Islamist militant group founded in 2014

- أنصار الخلافة الفلبينية
- Logo
- Other name: Ansar al-Khilafah in the Philippines; Ansarul Khilafah Philippines
- Leaders: Mohammad Jaafar Maguid (a.k.a. Abu Sharifah) †; Abdullah Nilong (POW); Bassir Sahak †
- Dates active: 2014–2024
- Split from: Moro Islamic Liberation Front
- Country: Philippines
- Allegiance: Islamic State
- Active regions: Sarangani and South Cotabato
- Ideology: Salafi jihadism
- Status: Dismantled
- Size: 50

Ansar Khalifa Philippines (AKP), also referred to as Ansar al-Khilafah in the Philippines and Ansarul Khilafah Philippines (Arabic: أنصار الخلافة في الفلبين, romanized: ʾAnṣār al-Khilāfa fī al-Filibbīn, lit. ''Supporters of the Caliphate in the Philippines'') was a Philippine-based militant group split from Moro Islamic Liberation Front (MILF), emerged in August 2014 when it released a video pledging allegiance to ISIS. The Armed Forces of the Philippines characterized the group as "bandits" engaging in cattle rustling and extortion activities. Malaysia listed the group as terrorist organization in 2019. In Mid-2021, the Philippine Government had announced that Ansar Khalifa Philippines (AKP) has been dismantled.

== Background ==
Ansar Khalifa Philippines was allegedly based in the provinces of South Cotabato and Sarangani and was initially led by Abu Sharifah. The group was considered to have the closest link to ISIS fighters in Syria among local terrorist groups in the Philippines.

Mohammad Jaafar Maguid, identified as the leader of Ansar Khalifa Philippines, was killed in an operation conducted by the National Intelligence Coordinating Agency and the Philippine National Police on January 5, 2017, in Kiamba, Sarangani. Maguid was said to have been trained by Zulkifli Abdhir in bomb-making. A few weeks later, the group's new leader, Abdullah Nilong, was captured by policemen in Polomolok, South Cotabato.

In October 2017, Maguid's widow, Karen Aizha Hamidon, was arrested for recruiting fighters and spreading propaganda related to the Battle of Marawi and the Maute group. Filipino authorities attributed 296 social media posts related to "recruiting to the ranks of the ISIS-affiliated Muslim militants" in Marawi to her authorship. She was also identified as a "close associate" of Musa Cerantonio, an Australian Islamic scholar and ISIL supporter.

== Activities ==
In November 2015, eight members of Ansar Khalifa Philippines were killed in a four-hour firefight against Philippine military units in Sultan Kudarat. One of the dead militants was identified as Abdul Fatah, an Indonesian national. On December 28, militants threw an explosive device at Kulotot Videoke Bar in Rosary Heights IV neighborhood, Cotabato City, Maguindanao. There were no casualties or material damages as the device did not fully detonate, Ansar Al-Khilafa claimed responsibility for the attack.

Philippine security officials have stated that Ansar Khalifa Philippines had cooperated with the Maute group in carrying out the 2016 Davao City bombing. In December 2016, two alleged members of the group were captured by Philippine National Police personnel after a bomb they planted in a trash bin near the United States embassy in Manila failed to explode.

The group was said to have worked with the Abu Sayyaf in carrying out the abortive plan to kidnap tourists in the Visayas region that culminated in the 2017 Bohol clash. Furthermore, they were reported to have contributed fighters in support of the Maute group-led assault that resulted in the Battle of Marawi. In October 2018, Bassir Sahak, an alleged leader of the group was killed in an encounter with state forces in Sitio Lebe, Barangay Daliao, Maasim, Sarangani.
