= 2002 Zamboanga City bombings =

Attacks in the Philippines

- Location: Four separate locations in Zamboanga City
- Date: First bombing: October 2, 2002; 24 years ago Second bombing: October 17, 2002; Third bombing: October 21, 2002
- Target: Two department stores, Fort Pillar shrine and a karaoke bar/restaurant opposite a military base.
- Deaths: at least 11
- Injuries: at least 180
- Perpetrators: unknown (MILF, Abu Sayyaf, and Jemaah Islamiyah suspected)

The 2002 Zamboanga bombings were a series of attacks perpetrated on the October 2, 17 and 21, 2002, around the southern Philippine port of Zamboanga City, Mindanao island. Eleven people died and over 180 others were wounded in the four bomb attacks allegedly perpetrated by Islamic extremists with connections to the Abu Sayyaf insurgent group.

== Attacks ==
=== October 2 ===
A bomb blast in front of a Malagutay district karaoke bar near a military arms depot in Zamboanga City killed an American Green Beret commando and three Filipino civilians. At least 25 other people, one of them another American trooper, were wounded in the blast. Investigators were looking at the possibility of a suicide attack as the rider of a motorcycle where the explosives were rigged was among the fatalities. A military intelligence report said the attack was staged by a "four-man urban terrorist group" of Abu Sayyaf, which has been linked to al-Qaeda. Philippine National Police chief Director General Hermogenes Ebdane Jr. stated the motorcycle driver had been identified as a member of Abu Sayyaf from a sketch based on witnesses' accounts and the body. According to police, the bomb that exploded in Malagutay weighed around a kilo and contained "brownish" explosive that may have been a mixture of gunpowder and TNT.

=== October 20 ===
Two TNT bombs exploded around noon inside a shopping centre in the commercial district of Zamboanga City, when the mall was most busy, killing at least seven and wounding about 150 people. Two department stores were devastated in the attack. The first blast occurred at 11:30 a.m. at the Shop-o-Rama department store and was followed a half hour later by a second explosion at the adjacent Shoppers Central store. Police Chief Mario Yanga said the bombs were deposited at counters where shoppers leave packages as they enter. The explosions occurred as ceremonies were being held in the city to hand over command of the military's Southern Command from Lt. Gen. Ernesto Carolina to Lt. Gen. Narciso Abaya. Following the blasts, Zamboanga police bomb squads blew up five suspicious packages, however further examination found they contained no explosives.

=== October 21 ===
A Philippine Marine guarding the church was killed and 18 others wounded after a bomb, placed in bag left at a candle store, exploded at Fort Pilar, a Catholic shrine in Zamboanga City.

== Perpetrators ==
Hours before the October 21 blast, police in Manila captured a man they said was a senior member of the Muslim extremist group, Abu Sayyaf, suspected of staging the earlier blasts. Police arrested five more suspects on the 22nd. On November 15, Abdulmukim Edris, who had a million peso bounty on his head, was arrested in Pasay after the issuing of 11 warrants of arrest by the regional trial court in Isabela, Basilan for a string of pending criminal cases, including murder and kidnapping for ransom. Edris was tagged as the mastermind in the October 17 bombings.

== See also ==
- Terrorism in the Philippines
