= 2006 Central Mindanao bombings =

Terrorist incident in the Philippines

- Location: multiple locations in Central Mindanao (Tacurong and Makilala)
- Date: October 10–11, 2006
- Target: multiple targets (incl. public market, bank, shopping mall)
- Deaths: 8
- Injuries: at least 30
- Perpetrators: unknown (MILF, Abu Sayyaf, and Jemaah Islamiyah suspected)

The 2006 Central Mindanao bombings were a series of three bombings and one attempted bombing in Central Mindanao on October 10 and 11. Eight people were killed and between 30 and 46 were injured.

== Bombings ==
=== Tacurong ===
A bomb exploded in a public market in Tacurong City, a predominantly Christian agricultural region in Sultan Kudarat, killing two women and injuring at least 4 others. A guard reportedly found the bomb in a bag filled with packets of corn chips and attempted to remove it from a crowd before it exploded, preventing more casualties. The bomb was described as being formed from a mortar round and remotely triggered by cell phone, however it apparently went off prematurely.

=== Makilala ===
A bomb exploded at around 8 p.m. in front of the town hall of Makilala town in the southern part of Cotabato province, killing 6 and injuring at least 42 others. The bomb exploded nearby a row of commercial stalls and a carnival during celebrations of Makilala's founding anniversary. Quoting witnesses, the Cotabato Provincial Police Chief stated an unidentified man carrying a plastic bag was seen visiting a stall selling alcohol in a crowded area along a highway, the explosion occurred minutes later. The powerful explosion destroyed a row of stalls, two motorcycle taxis and left a deep crater in the asphalt road, the Police Chief said. The following day, another bomb was defused by the authorities nearby.

== Response ==
=== Government ===
Emmanuel Piñol, the governor of Cotabato province, blamed members of the Moro Islamic Liberation Front (MILF) for the bombings, citing similarities with previous bombings. According to Piñol, the bomb used in Makilala had "all the signatures of the MILF".

Army bomb experts said that the bomb was detonated via a mobile phone and that twenty missed calls were logged when the phone was found.

Others suggest the Abu Sayyaf or Jemaah Islamiyah (JI) was behind the attacks, as the arrest of Istiada Binti Oemar Sovie, the wife of JI leader Dulmatin, in Sulu may have prompted the attacks. Dulmatin himself is reportedly hiding on Jolo Island.

=== International ===
A day after the attacks, the Australian government advised its nationals to exercise a “high degree of caution...due to high threat of terrorist attack” and to avoid places frequented by foreigners in Metro Manila, Mindanao (including Sulu), and Cebu.

The United Kingdom, Canada, Japan, New Zealand, and the United States also issued travel warnings.
