= 2014 Bukidnon bus bombing =

Bus Bombing in Maramag, Bukidnon

- A red bus (top left) in front of the Central Mindanao University main entrance, shortly before a bomb was detonated onboard
- Location: 7.859301°N 125.052763°E; Maramag, Bukidnon, Philippines
- Date: December 9, 2014; 15:45 (UTC+8)
- Target: Bus
- Attack type: Bombing
- Weapon: IED
- Deaths: 11
- Injuries: 43
- Motive: extortion

The 2014 Bukidnon bus bombing occurred in the Philippines on December 9, 2014, when a bomb exploded inside of a bus in front of the main entrance of Central Mindanao University along Sayre Highway in Maramag, Bukidnon. The blast, from an 81 mm mortar bomb hid inside a sack in the vehicle's overhead baggage rack, killed at least 11 people and injured another 43. The Bangsamoro Islamic Freedom Fighters (BIFF) were identified as possible perpetrators of the bombing although Spokesperson Abu Misri Mama denied the claims. The suspect was identified as Kidpawan City Jail escapee Macmod Manibpil and multiple murder and frustrated murder charges were filed against him.

== Background ==
The BIFF, a breakaway extremist group against peace talks between the government and the main group they separated from, the Moro Islamic Liberation Front (MILF) were suspected by Philippine authorities to be behind the bombings. Prior to the bus bombing, some rebels of the BIFF received training in the use of bombs. The bus was owned by transport company, Rural Transit Mindanao Incorporated (RTMI), bearing the traffic number 2640. The bus destination was Cagayan de Oro. Most of the passengers were heading home from a fiesta in Wao, Lanao del Sur. On October 21, 2010, 10 people were killed and 30 were injured after an RTMI bus exploded on the Kabacan-Matalam national highway in the town of Matalam, Cotabato. On November 6, a month before the bus bombing, another RTMI bus exploded in Barangay Dolongon, Maramag, injuring four people.

Prior to the attack, there were claims that the bus company has faced threats for refusing to pay "taxes" to the BIFF. Before the November 6 bombing, a threat was sent by an unknown person, and after the November 6 bombing, more messages were sent by unknown people stating that a bigger bomb would be placed in one of the company's buses if 50,000 PHP per month was not paid. The company failed to notify police about the threats. The last message was sent 30 minutes before the explosion, telling the company about the plan.

== Bombing ==
At 17:45 PHT (09:45 UTC) on December 9, 2014, an explosive device went off at the back of the bus as it was in transit in front of the Central Mindanao University main entrance along Sayre Highway in Sitio Musuan, Barangay Dologon, Maramag. According to Bukidnon police spokesperson Inspector Jeselle Longakit, the device was an improvised 81 mm mortar bomb hidden in a sack placed in the vehicle's overhead baggage rack that was set off using a mobile phone. Nine people: five men and four women died on the spot while two others died during care at the hospital.

== Reactions and aftermath ==
An anonymous army commander said the bombing was an "act of terrorism" to Reuters while an anonymous officer said the BIFF "does not want the peace process to succeed." BIFF spokesperson Abu Misri Mama denied any involvement from the BIFF, claiming they would not gain any benefit from conducting such attacks and said the accusations against them were fabricated. ARMM Governor Mujiv Hataman said "these perpetrators are cowards; they target innocent people and they should be placed behind bars and face justice," but said that a group cannot be blamed without sufficient proof.

== Perpetrators ==
The perpetrators were captured by closed-circuit television in the Poblacion, Maramag, where the bus stopped. According to an anonymous army commander, the BIFF were the perpetrators of the attack intending to derail the peace deal between the MILF and the government. Another possible motive was extortion due to RTMI's refusal to pay protection money. Western Mindanao Command Manager Lieutenant General Rustico Guerrero said that the BIFF could also possibly be behind the attack. Eastern Mindanao Command Manager Lieutenant General Aurelio Baladad reported that the bomb was a signature bomb of the BIFF, agreeing that the explosion could have been perpetrated by the group. Another suspected perpetrator was the Khalifa Islamiyah Mindanao, with members training on bombs and explosives on the outskirts of Wao. After a sketch based on the testimonies of two witnesses matched the picture of a criminal: Macmod Manibpil, an escapee from the Kidapawan City Jail, a suspect of the 2006 Kabacan, North Cotabato bombing, and an alleged member of the BIFF. Multiple murder and frustrated murder charges were filed against him by the Bukidnon Provincial Prosecutor’s Office in Malaybalay. The suspect still remains at large.
