= Kurt Maute =

German engineer (born 1965)

Kurt Karl Christian Maute (born 1965) is a German engineer.

Maute earned a Diplom in aerospace engineering from University of Stuttgart in 1992, and completed his doctorate in civil engineering from the same university in 1998. Maute moved to the University of Colorado Boulder in the United States to conduct postdoctoral research, and subsequently joined the faculty as an assistant professor in 2000. Promoted successively to an associate, then full professorship in 2006 and 2012, respectively, Maute held the Joseph Negler Professorship from 2011, and was appointed Palmer Engineering Chair in 2016. Between 2012 and 2014, Maute was Associate Dean for Research for the College of Engineering and Applied Science, and from 2023, has served as Associate Dean for Undergraduate Education within the same college.
