= 2017 Bohol clashes =

Armed conflicts

Coordinates: 10.0314°N 124.0674°E

- Part of the Moro conflict and Operation Enduring Freedom – Philippines
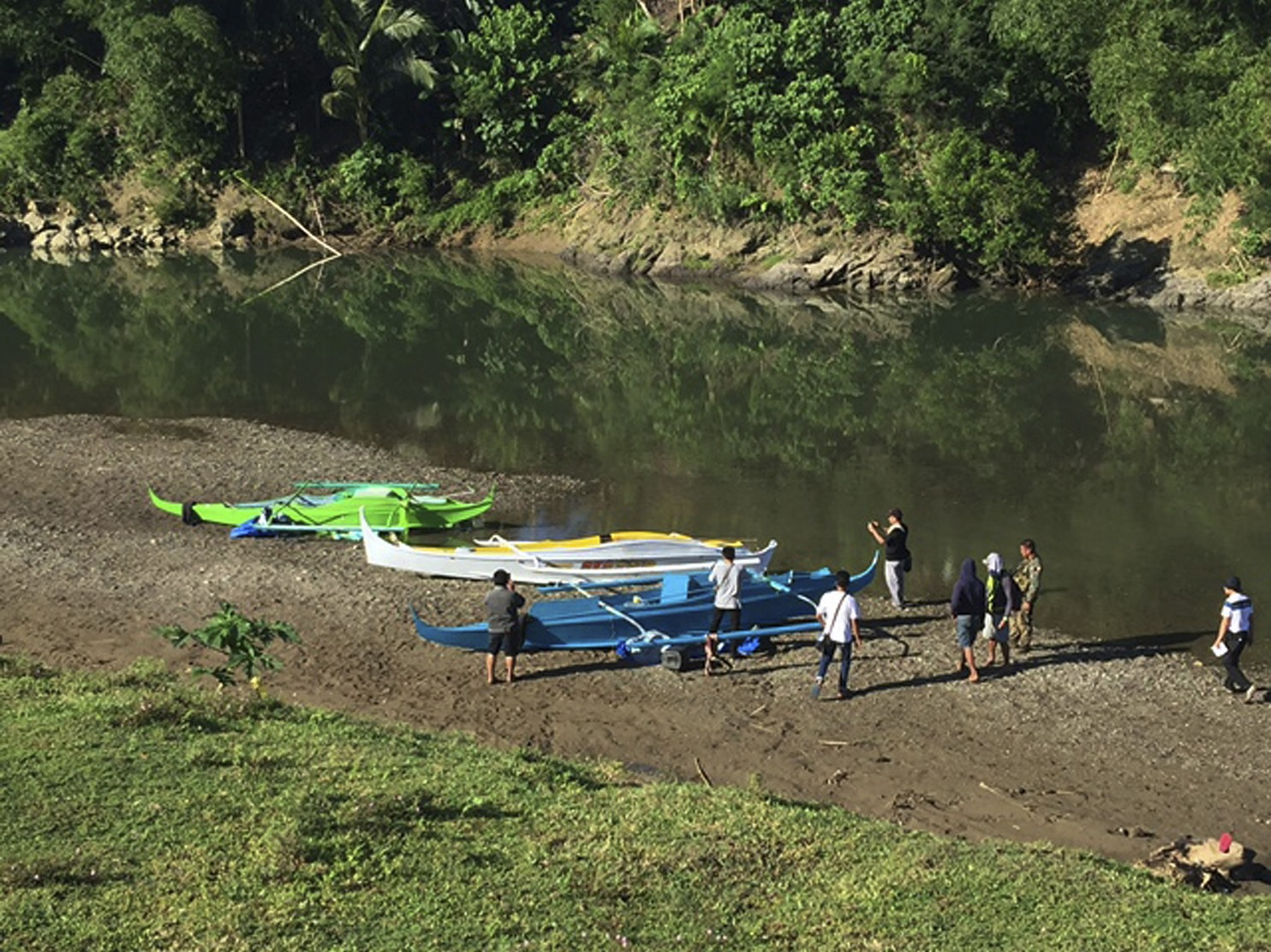
- Pump boats used by Abu Sayyaf in the Bohol attack
Date	April 11, 2017 (Initial clash); April 22, 2017 (subsequent clashes); May 15, 2017 (final clash)
Location	Inabanga, Bohol, Philippines
Status	Philippine victory

Belligerents
Philippines: Armed Forces of the Philippines; Philippine National Police	Islamic State of Iraq and the Levant: Abu Sayyaf; Maute group; Ansar Khalifa Philippines

Commanders and leaders
(Philippines) Rodrigo Duterte; Oscar T. Lactao; Noli G. Taliño	Muammar Askali †; Abu Rami; Joselito Melloria †; Abu Alih

Units involved
Philippine Army; Philippine Navy; Philippine Air Force; Philippine National Police	Marakat Ansar Battalion (ASG)

Strength
1,000+	11 militants

Casualties and losses
3 killed 1 killed 2 wounded	11 killed
- 2 civilians killed, 425–700 individuals evacuated; more than a thousand displaced.

The 2017 Bohol clashes were armed conflicts that took place in April and May 2017 between Philippine security forces and Moro ISIL-affiliated militants led by members of the Abu Sayyaf in Inabanga, Bohol, Philippines. Three Philippine Army soldiers, a policeman, four terrorists and two civilians were killed during the initial firefight. Subsequent firefights between the remaining militants and security forces resulted in the deaths of all the Abu Sayyaf insurgents. A ranking officer of the Philippine National Police linked to Abu Sayyaf attempted to rescue some of the insurgents but was arrested.

The clashes marked the first recorded operation of the Abu Sayyaf group in the Visayas region of the Philippines, far from their strongholds in the Sulu Archipelago.

== Background ==
Five days before the initial incident, the Armed Forces of the Philippines had detected the departure of a group of Abu Sayyaf from Indanan, Sulu bound for the Central Visayas. On April 9, 2017, the US Embassy in Manila issued a travel warning based on "credible" reports of kidnapping threats. A day before the first firefight, the AFP received reports of the presence of eleven armed men in three pump boats entering the Inabanga River in Bohol.

== The initial clash ==
A firefight between a joint Philippine Army and police force and the Abu Sayyaf began at approximately 5:00 in the morning of April 11, 2017, in Barangay Napo in the town of Inabanga. A Philippine Air Force plane conducted airstrikes against the Abu Sayyaf, while a Philippine Navy gunboat was deployed to block possible escape routes by sea. Three Philippine Army troopers, a policeman, two civilians and four Abu Sayyaf members were killed in the clash. Reports indicated that three extremist groups that have pledged allegiance to ISIL participated in the Bohol attack: a hard-line Abu Sayyaf faction known as the Marakat Ansar Battalion (called the Marakah al Ansar Battalion by another source), the Maute group and Ansar Khalifa Philippines.

=== Aftermath ===
A day after the firefight, the body of Abu Sayyaf sub-leader Muamar Askali, also known as Abu Rami, was recovered from the scene of the clash. Askali was implicated in the beheading of two Canadian hostages, John Ridsdel and Robert Hall in 2016, and German tourist Jürgen Kantner in February 2017. On April 13, two days after the clash, another Abu Sayyaf fatality was recovered by security forces after being buried by his companions in Barangay Lonoy Cainsican in Inabanga.

Two civilians killed in the firefight were initially tagged as Abu Sayyaf casualties. Government troops recovered M16 and M4 rifles, and bomb-making paraphernalia from the scene of the clash. The Armed Forces of the Philippines and civil authorities declared Bohol "cleared" a day after the firefight.

== Subsequent clashes ==
On April 22, 2017, four more Abu Sayyaf militants were killed during firefights in Bohol, including sub-leader and guide Joselito Melloria, also known as Abu Alih. Two weeks later, the AFP announced the arrest of Abu Saad, one of the three remaining Abu Sayyaf members who had evaded capture. A day later, Abu Saad was reported killed after attempting to escape while in police custody. The last two militants were finally located after they took a local resident hostage and were killed in a firefight against security forces on May 15, 2017.

On the evening of April 22, 2017, Police Supt. Maria Christina Nobleza, the deputy regional chief of the crime laboratory in the Davao Region, and her alleged lover, Reenor Lou Dungon, were arrested in a military checkpoint in Barangay Bacani, Clarin, Bohol. The two, authorities stated, were planning to rescue the remaining Abu Sayyaf members who were being hunted down by government troops. Dungon is said to be the brother-in-law of slain Abu Sayyaf leader Abu Solaiman.

== See also ==
- Marawi crisis
