= Lanao del Sur's 2nd parliamentary district =

Parliamentary district for the Bangsamoro Parliament

- Constituency for the Bangsamoro Parliament
- Boundary of Lanao del Sur's 2nd parliamentary district in Lanao del Sur
- Province: Lanao del Sur
- Population: 137,228 (2024)
- Electorate: 91,282 (2026)

Current constituency
- Member of Parliament: Hamza Gauraki (elect)
- Political party: UBJP

Lanao del Sur's 2nd parliamentary district is the second of the nine parliamentary districts of the province of Lanao del Sur for the Bangsamoro Parliament. It is composed of the municipalities of Kapai, Marantao, Piagapo, and Saguiaran.

Hamza Gauraki of the United Bangsamoro Justice Party is the member of Parliament-elect for the district following the inaugural 2026 Bangsamoro Parliament election. He will assume office on October 30, 2026.

== List of MPs representing the district ==
No.	Portrait	Member (Lifespan)	Term of office	Party	Parliament	Electoral history	Constituencies
1		Hamza Gauraki (born 1985)	Assuming office on October 30, 2026	UBJP	1st Parliament	Elected in 2026.	2026–present Kapai, Marantao, Piagapo, Saguiaran

== Election results ==
=== 2026 ===
2026 Bangsamoro Parliament election in Lanao del Sur
Party	Candidate	Votes	%
UBJP	Hamza Gauraki	41,393	52.90
SIAP	Boyet Alonto	36,477	46.62
Independent	Salahuden Edres	305	0.39
PRO Bangsamoro	Samanudin Bazer	66	0.08
Total votes		78,241	100.00
UBJP win (new seat)			
