= Piagapo =

Municipality in Lanao del Sur, Philippines

Piagapo فياغافو
- Municipality
- Municipality of Piagapo
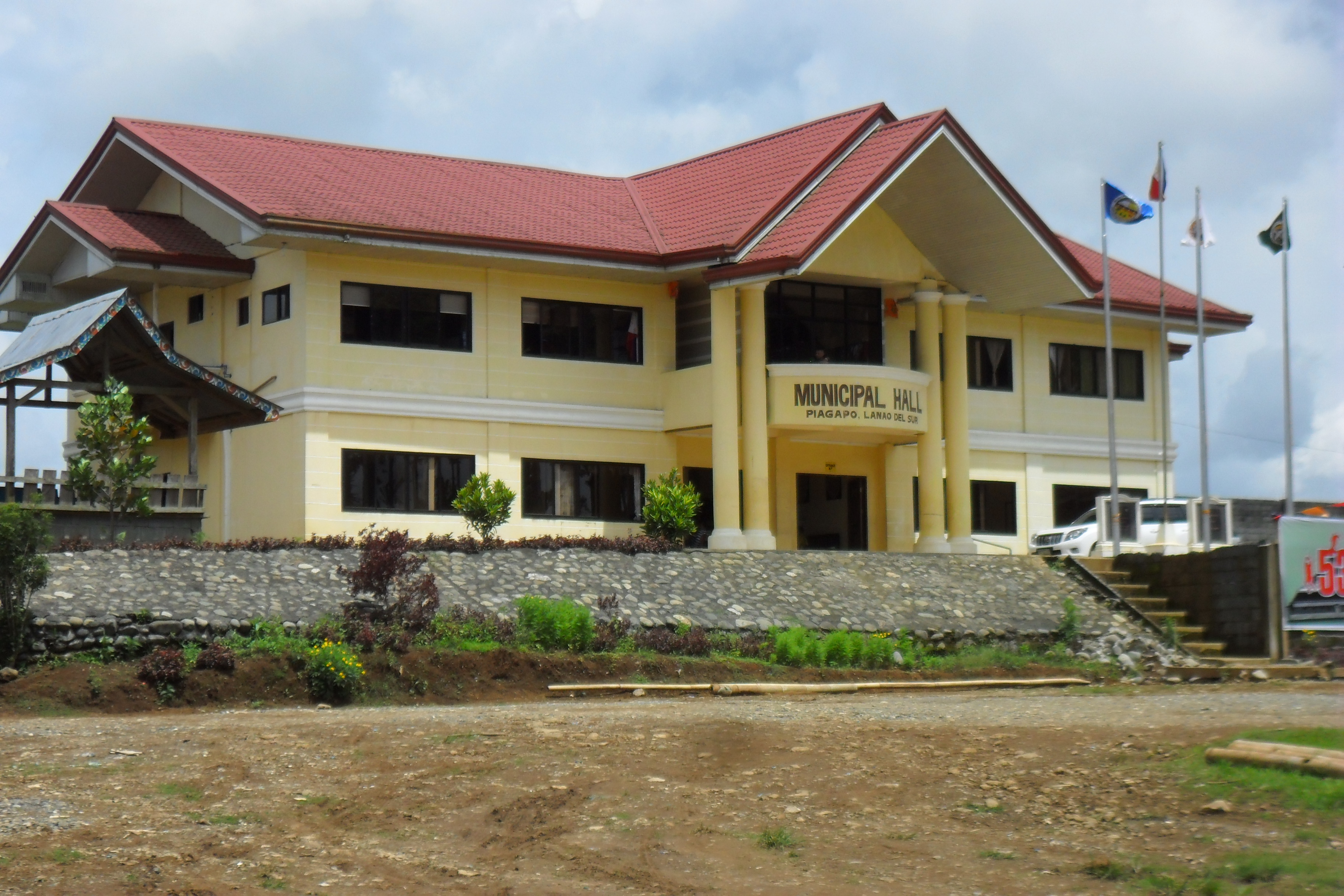
- Municipal Hall

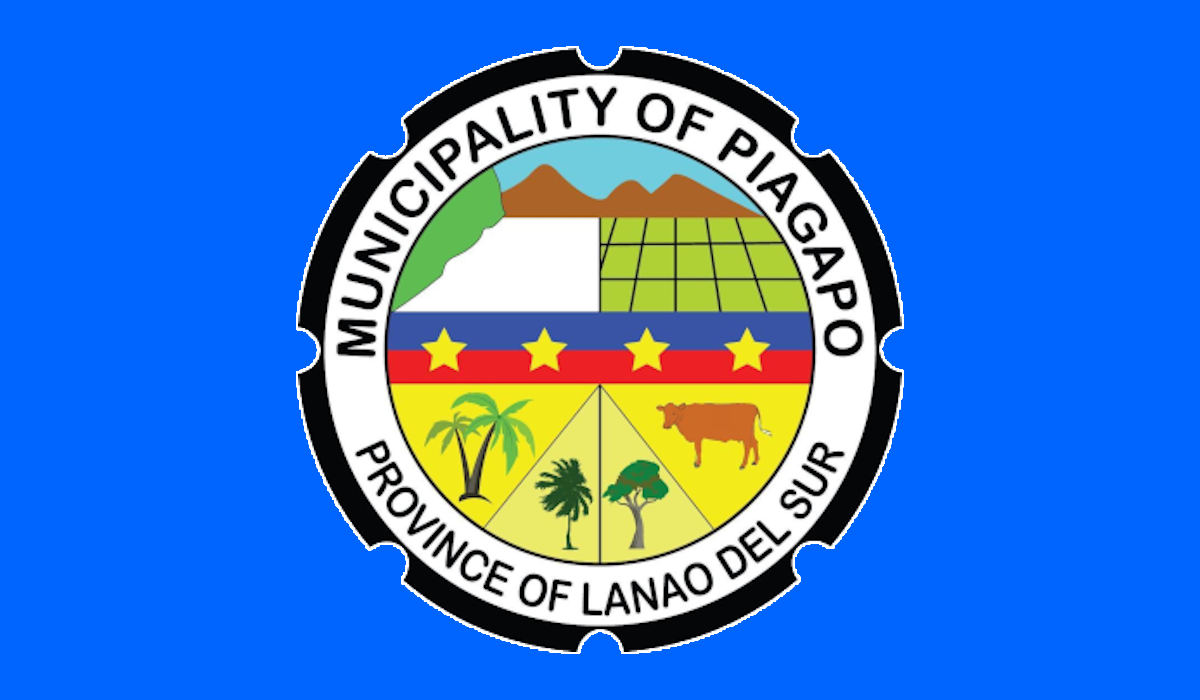
- Flag Seal

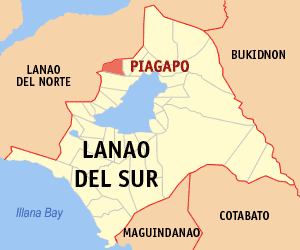
- Map of Lanao del Sur with Piagapo highlighted
- Interactive map of Piagapo
- Location within the Philippines
- Coordinates: 7°59′28″N 124°10′41″E
- Country: Philippines
- Region: Bangsamoro Autonomous Region in Muslim Mindanao
- Province: Lanao del Sur
- House district: 1st district
- Parliamentary district: 2nd district
- Barangays: 37 (see Barangays)

Government
  - Type: Sangguniang Bayan
  - Mayor: Ali L. Sumandar
  - Vice Mayor: Norombae M. Manalocon-Sumandar
  - House Representative: Ziaur-Rahman A. Adiong
  - Municipal Council: Members: Abubacar L. Sumandar; Mosatafa D. Panganting; Mano L. Acoon; Suhaylah M. Mulok; Macacuna M. Banisil; Samanuddin M. Bazer; Shamil M. Campong; Samsodin M. Mamao
  - Electorate: 16,675 voters (2025)

Area
  - Total: 340.07 km^{2} (131.30 sq mi)
- Elevation: 903 m (2,963 ft)
- Highest elevation: 1,507 m (4,944 ft)
- Lowest elevation: 591 m (1,939 ft)

Population (2024 census)
  - Total: 40,558
  - Density: 119.26/km^{2} (308.89/sq mi)
  - Households: 4,746

Economy
  - Income class: 2nd municipal income class
  - Poverty incidence: 24.95% (2023)
  - Revenue: ₱ 184.7 million (2024)
  - Assets: ₱ 224.2 million (2024)
  - Expenditure: ₱ 187.4 million (2024)
  - Liabilities: ₱ 89.45 million (2024)

Service provider
  - Electricity: Lanao del Sur Electric Cooperative (LASURECO)
- Time zone: UTC+8 (PST)
- ZIP code: 9710
- PSGC: 1903621000
- IDD : area code: +63 (0)63
- Native languages: Maranao; Tagalog
- Website: www.piagapo-lds.gov.ph

Piagapo, officially the Municipality of Piagapo (Maranao: Inged a Piagapo; Tagalog: Bayan ng Piagapo), is a municipality in the province of Lanao del Sur, Philippines. According to the 2024 census, it has a population of 40,558 people.

== History ==
The municipality was named Piagapo as the word relates closely to several royal houses of the Pat A Pangampong a Ranao. It is believed that during the ancient time, Piagapo was territorial land originally ruled by a queen ruler "Dayang Labi", a direct descendant of Sharief Kabungsuan, the first Muslim missionary who landed in Maguindanao to spread the religion Islam. Being queen ruler of the land, she was popularly enthroned and widely known as the "Bai sa Radapan". Furthermore, to retain her name and legacy in the history of Piagapo, one of the Barangays was named after her title as the Bai sa Radapan. It was called Radapan. This is the place where most of her descendants reside. Moreover, claimants of the sultanate leadership in the different areas of Piagapo usually trace up their genealogical origin from the progenitor, the Bai sa Radapan. Only her progeny can claim a royal title. The Municipality of Piagapo was once a component of the Municipality of Saguiaran, Lanao del Sur. On June 9, 1961, the president signed Executive Order No. 431 creating Piagapo into a municipal district which took effect effectively. The name Piagapo was proposed by a group of leaders from Sendigan led by Sultan a Diamla and presented by Mangompia S. Gunting. The name Piagapo was unanimously adopted as the name of the municipal district. Piagapo was then converted into a regular municipality on July 1, 1965, by virtue of Executive Order No. 166 signed on August 27, 1965. Piagapo is divided into three districts: Sundigan A Piagapo, Pat a Panoroganan, Bubonga Marantao and composed of 37 barangay.

=== Martial law ===
Piagapo is one of the municipalities suffered and receiving evacuees from municipality of Munai and municipality of Tangcal during Martial Law in 1972. Almost all evacuees living in Munai at the time abandoned their homes, livestock, and land, moving to the boundary of Lanao del Sur and Lanao del Norte.

Most of the people stay meanwhile to Barangay Lininding of Munai, a boundary of Municipality of Piagapo, Lanao del Sur. The only remaining people that time of evacuation process were the Moro (Male and Female including Children) Fighter and one of their Leader Commander was Commander Tagoranao "AKA James Bond" Macapaar bin Sabbar, a MNLF Top Commander for Lanao del Norte. Late Commander James Bond is the sibling of MILF Top Commander Abdullah Macapaar "Commander Bravo". Moro Rebels from Munai had a fight side by side with the Moro Rebels from neighboring Tangkal against Philippines Constabulary (PC) Army.

After peaceful was process in the middle of 1980s, the team of MILF Commander Sultan Saifudin Romandiar Tomawis and MILF Commander Sultan Tagoranao Goldiano Macapaar bin Sabbar along with the MILF Commander Sansarona from Maguindanao had stay and made a temporary "MILF Camp Bansayan" in Bansayan, a barangay of Piagapo until end of EDSA Revolution on 1986. During the stay, there were enormous battle between MILF forces and Government Forces. Both MILF Commanders had gone to Afghanistan to join the war against Russian on 1984. The said Camp was abandoned by MILF Soldiers when civilian had given the map and provide with guide the Government Forces when that MILF Camp on early EDSA Revolution. On the Attack of Government Forces, they come secretly at night in barangay bansayan and they stay at the near of the MILF Camp Bansayan for almost 10hrs until 3:00AM and strike the Camp. One of the field commander who stayed long and withdrew later to fight is Commander Abiden Dimacuta Umpar because he handled a .30 machine gun.

=== Contemporary era ===
On December 3, 2023, a bombing incident occurred at the Mindanao State University in Marawi City, Lanao del Sur, with the two main suspects later being identified by the Philippine National Police as residents of Barangay Gacap, Piagapo.

== Geography ==
It is located in the first district of the province of Lanao del Sur, Autonomous Region in Muslim Mindanao (ARMM) and has total land area of 340.09 square kilometers distributed over the 37 barangays that are predominantly populated by Maranao people.

=== Barangays ===
Piagapo is politically subdivided into 37 barangays. Each barangay consists of puroks while some have sitios. These barangays are further grouped into 3 districts.

Bubonga Marantao

- Aposong
- Bubo
- Bualan
- Bubonga Ilian
- Bubonga Mamaanun
- Bubonga Tawaan
- Ilian Proper
- Ilian Poblacion
- Lumbaca Mamaanun
- Mamaanun
- Mentring
- Palao
- Paling
- Paridi
- Pindolonan
- Rantian
- Sapingit

Pat A Panoroganan

- Bangco
- Basak
- Gacap
- Katumbacan
- Olango
- Pantaon
- Pantar
- Radapan Poblacion
- Radapan Proper
- Tambo
- Tapocan
- Tawaan

Sundigan A Piagapo

- Bagoingud
- Bansayan
- Kalungnan
- Lininding
- Palacat
- Talao
- Taporug
- Udalo

=== Terrain and natural resources ===
The area is hilly and mountainous with scattered plain areas suitable for agricultural activities. These plain portions are either upland or lowland. It is rich in natural resources such as wide vast of forest area with varieties of good trees, rivers, springs and streams that have good potentials for further development. However, the local government unit should pay attention on the issues regarding illegal logging and kainging otherwise the community would be prone to erosion and landslides that will endanger many lives. The natural resources of the Municipality especially its wide and diverse forest should be protected and preserved.

=== Climate ===
Climate data for Piagapo, Lanao de Sur
Month	Jan	Feb	Mar	Apr	May	Jun	Jul	Aug	Sep	Oct	Nov	Dec	Year
Mean daily maximum °C (°F)	23 (73)	23 (73)	24 (75)	25 (77)	24 (75)	24 (75)	24 (75)	24 (75)	24 (75)	24 (75)	24 (75)	23 (73)	24 (75)
Mean daily minimum °C (°F)	18 (64)	18 (64)	18 (64)	19 (66)	20 (68)	20 (68)	19 (66)	19 (66)	19 (66)	19 (66)	19 (66)	19 (66)	19 (66)
Average precipitation mm (inches)	159 (6.3)	143 (5.6)	166 (6.5)	183 (7.2)	357 (14.1)	414 (16.3)	333 (13.1)	309 (12.2)	289 (11.4)	285 (11.2)	253 (10.0)	166 (6.5)	3,057 (120.4)
Average rainy days	18.4	17.2	20.6	23.4	29.3	29.2	29.9	29.4	27.7	28.7	25.5	19.9	299.2
Source: Meteoblue (modeled/calculated data, not measured locally)

Piagapo being part of Lanao del Sur has predominantly cold climate. The climate observed in the community is very unpredictable where rainfalls are mostly observed during the month of July, August, September and October. Dry season is observed during summer the month of March, April and May. The Municipality is hilly and mountainous. The beautiful mountains with vast trees in the area serve as natural barriers against typhoon and strong wind and other natural calamities.

== Demographics ==
Population census of Piagapo
Year	Pop.	±% p.a.
1970	7,248	—
1975	12,920	+12.29%
1980	12,108	−1.29%
1990	16,730	+3.29%
1995	19,198	+2.61%
2000	23,903	+4.81%
2007	34,792	+5.31%
2010	21,974	−15.40%
2015	25,440	+2.83%
2020	30,132	+3.63%
2024	40,558	+7.39%
Source: Philippine Statistics Authority

The Municipality of Piagapo is a Muslim area that is predominantly populated by Maranao tribe who are culturally bounded people. Its people, majority of which, do not accept birth control, birth spacing and other methods. They believe it is against their religious belief. However, majority of them learned to accept other health intervention particularly to maintain and improve health status. This belief and value of the people of Piagapo had caused an increase in its population from time to time. This is revealed by the different census conducted by NSO in different year. The latest and current population of the municipality as distributed to its 37 barangays is 21,974 as shown in the table below. The average household size is 3.78 or 4 persons per household. But based on 2007 census of population, Piagapo has 5,417 household and the average household size is 6.42.

=== Population growth rate ===
The population of Piagapo varies according to the different population census conducted by the NSO, at an increasing trend. In 1995, its total population was 19,198. It increased by about 4,705 or 24.50% in a span of five years. Hence, the annual growth rate between the 1995 and 2000 was 4.5%. In 2007, another census was conducted by the NSO. That census that revealed that Piagapo's population was increased to 34,792. Between 2000 and 2007, the population increased by 10,889 or 45.5% for a span of 7 years. Hence, the population growth rates is 6.5% annually, which is very high. However, it was somehow unbelievable and unrealistic, that between 2007 and 2010, The population of Piagapo tremendously declined from 34,792 to 21,974 in just a span of 3 years. The decrease was unusual and very abrupt. The constituents of Piagapo could not believe it, even when some of the residents migrated to other areas in the Philippines temporarily after occurrence of the all-out war against the MILF in the previous years.

== Economy ==
Poverty Incidence of Piagapo

Source: Philippine Statistics Authority

=== Agricultural products ===
People of Piagapo are mostly farmers by occupation who generally produce corn, rice as major agricultural products. However, there are few of them who also plant other agricultural products such as trees like mahogany, acacia, and various fruit trees. Vegetables, species and root crops particularly cassava, camote and the like are among the secondary products in the municipality. Due to problem on farm to market road, farmers usually produce mostly for home consumption.

=== Livestock ===
Aside from producing agricultural products as the main source of income, some of the residents in the municipality raised carabaos, and cows as working animals. Poultry products such as chicken, duck, and goose are also raised but in limited number and for household consumption only. Raising poultry products is a way of subsidizing the basic needs of the people. Raising livestock like chicken is becoming very discouraging due to lack of knowledge on controlling disease of this livestock. Livestock like carabao and cows are in some cases raised in the community by some well off families, farmers and landlord in limited quantity and mainly as work animal or some times for rent.

=== Market outlet ===
Farm-to-Market road has been a problem almost all over the municipality. Poor road coupled with the absence of Municipal Local Public Market, make it more difficult for the farmers to market their products. The agricultural products are usually marketed either to Saguiaran, Baloi, Lanao del Norte, Pantaoaragat and Iligan City. The decision of the farmers where to market their products is usually dependent on the price offered by the different buyers/middlemen available in the above-mentioned market areas. However, more frequently the price offered is unreasonable. In addition thereto, the expensive transportation cost of products makes farming a losing, discouraging and undesirable low profile venture to the people. Hence, the municipality, in cooperation with other agencies, should give careful attention to these issues and should provide, improve and rehabilitate farm to market road and educate farmers on adoptable agricultural technology and provide a centralized Public Market in a strategic area in the locality where the products of the farmers can be marketed at reasonable fair price and less transportation cost.

== Infrastructure ==
=== Transportation ===
The accessibility and availability of farm-to-market roads has been a widely known issue of the people of Piagapo for many years, especially those residents from the far flung and interior areas of the municipality which usually use horses as the primary mode of transportation. Though some barangays can somehow be reached through land transportation via Saguiaran, through the long winding provincial road that transverse the municipality, and through barangay road extending from Barangay Kabingan, MSU, Marawi City to Barangay Bobo, Piagapo, most areas are still inaccessible. Not all kinds of vehicle can access the area due to the condition of the provincial road and several barangay roads. The provincial road is segmented road. Some parts are cemented while several portions are still earth fill and impassable or inaccessible like TAPORUG, TALAO, KALUNGUNAN, BAGOA INGUD, LININDING, GACAP, BANGCO, and PALACAT especially during rainy season. They usually use horses as the primary mode of transportation.

=== Availability of electricity ===
Availability of electric power has been one of the major problems in Piagapo for a very long period of time. While 20 or 50% of the 37 barangays were provided with electricity by LASURECO, it is undeniable that the supply or availability of electricity in the locality is not regular. In fact, 17 barangays (46%) have been dwelling in darkness for a long period of time and had been longing and very eager to avail to such basic service while the rest are asking for its sustainability. Just recently, last August 2013, the municipality is totally in darkness, no electricity in the whole area of Piagapo. The irregularity of electric power in the municipality does not only hamper the development of the area but also slow down and seriously affect the performance and delivery of some services of the LGU. Moreover, the connection or installation of electric wiring has to be improved to avoid accidents and unwanted events relative to electricity.

== Education ==
The Department of Education (DepEd) has been exerting effort and great investment to address the needs for quality education and make it available on a vastly wider scale to develop those potentials. Presently, DepEd has the following number schools of different levels addressing the needs for quality education. The municipality of Piagapo is among the depressed areas that are confronted with problems on illiteracy. Illiteracy problem has been obvious in the area which is one among the major factors that hampers development.

== Government ==
The municipal hall of Piagapo is situated at Barangay Bobo, the first barangay to be reached from Saguiaran, Lanao del Sur, with an area of 11,270 square meter.

Elected officials 2022–2025:

- Municipal Mayor: Ali L. Sumandar
- Vice Mayor: Norombae Manalocon- Sumandar
- Sangguniang Bayan:
  - Abubacar L. Sumandar
  - Mosatafa D. Panganting
  - Mano L. Acoon
  - Suhaylah M. Mulok
  - Macacuna M. Banisil
  - Samanuddin M. Bazer
  - Shamil M. Campong
  - Samsodin M. Mamao
- ABC President: Camarudin M. Mulok
- SK President: Amer-hassan S. Bazer (Datu a bantugan sa piagapo)
- SB Secretary: Nasser B. Lumabao

=== List of former chief executives ===
- Datu Dimapunung Limbo
- Hadji AbdulRahman Masiu Orangot
- Maungangun Macalimbon
- Guimba Mandangan
- Bashier Amairomag
- Manaros Barao
- Sultan Jabber Amairomag
- Mitoon Ampang
- Manso Panganting
- Sultan Pindaton H. Omar
- Sultan Mawiyag Acoon
- Macondara Compa
- Amrossi Macatanong
- Umohanie B. Macatanong
- Ali L. Sumandar

=== Mayors under the Fifth Republic ===
- 1986–1988, Datu Mitoon M. Ampang
- 1988–1989, Tago Panganting
- 1989–1992, Sultan Mawiyag Acoon
- 1992–1995, Sultan Mawiyag Acoon
- 1995–January 1998, Sultan Mauyag Acoon
- January 1998–June 1998, Macondara Compa (Succeeded Mauyag Acoon due to untimely death)
- 1998–2001, Macondara Compa
- 2001–2004, Amrossi A. Macatanong
- 2004–2007, Amrossi A. Macatanong
- 2007–2010, Amrossi A. Macatanong
- 2010–2013, Umohanie Bato-Macatanong
- 2013–2016, Ali L. Sumandar
- 2016–2019, Ali L. Sumandar
- 2019–present, Cadidia M. Lininding
