= Omar Maute =

Filipino Islamist militant (1980–2017)

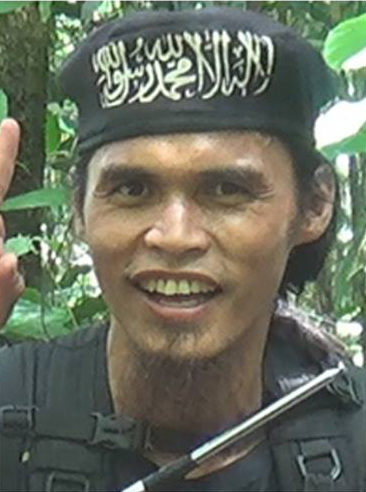
- Maute from a wanted poster published by the Philippine National Police
- Born: Omarkhayam Romato Maute; June 12, 1980; Butig, Lanao del Sur, Philippines
- Died: October 16, 2017 (aged 37); Marawi, Lanao del Sur, Philippines
- Military career
- Allegiance: Maute group (2012–2017); IS (2014–2017)
- Conflicts: Moro conflict Siege of Marawi †

Omarkhayam Romato Maute (June 12, 1980 – October 16, 2017) was a Filipino Islamist militant who co-founded, along with his brother Abdullah Maute, an Islamic State group in Mindanao based in the Philippines, commonly known as the Maute Group after their surname.

== Early life and education ==
Omar Maute was born on June 12, 1980. Siblings Omar and Abdullah Maute are descended from a Maranao warrior clan based in Butig, Lanao del Sur, the town where they were born and spent their childhood. They were born to Cayamora and Farhana Maute.

The brothers had worked in the Middle East as Overseas Filipino Workers. While working for secular schools in Syria and the United Arab Emirates, the brothers studied Wahhabism. Omar was reportedly educated in Egypt.

== Militant activity ==
=== MILF ===
Philippine military sources state that the siblings' father, Cayamora Maute, was a senior official of the Moro Islamic Liberation Front (MILF). After the MILF began to engage in peace negotiations with the Philippine government, the brothers criticized the MILF leadership and pledged allegiance to IS.

=== Maute group ===
The Mautes, according to their relatives, later established connections with Ameril Umbra Kato, the founder of the Bangsamoro Islamic Freedom Fighters (BIFF). The siblings reportedly sent representatives to Kato after the BIFF leader suffered a hypertensive stroke which rendered the left portion of his body paralyzed. After forging ties with Kato, the Mautes established the Maute group. Five other brothers also became involved in the group according to the Philippine military.

A February 2016 report stated that the relatives of Omar confirmed that he had been killed during the February 2016 Butig clash, along with a younger brother named Matti. However this report would be disproved a few months later.

==== Battle of Marawi ====
In May 2017, video footage found on a cellphone captured by Philippine government troops during the Battle of Marawi indicated that Omar was still alive at that time.

On June 10, 2017, during the Marawi crisis, the Philippine Army claimed that they were confident that the Maute duo had been killed in a firefight, although the details were not provided. This report was later disproved. In September 2017, the military stated that Omar alone among the seven Maute brothers remained alive, as the other six were killed in battle.

Omar Maute was killed on October 16, 2017, along with Isnilon Hapilon.

== Personal life ==
Omar Maute was said to be fluent in the Indonesian language, and was married to the daughter of a conservative Indonesian Islamic cleric. The Maute siblings include a third brother named Hashim who was detained in the Marawi City jail until 2016 when he successfully escaped.

His mother, Ominta Romato Maute, also known as Farhana Maute, has been described by some sources as the financier of the Maute group's activities, providing logistics and recruiting fighters. She was arrested on June 9, 2017, in Lanao del Sur. Her husband, Cayamora Maute, was arrested the day before in Davao City. Cayamora Maute died in August 2017 on the way to Taguig-Pateros District Hospital after experiencing difficulty in breathing.

On May 16, 2024, Taguig Regional Trial Court Branch 266 Judge Marivic C. Cudilla-Victor, in a 39-page decision convicted Ominta Romato Maute of money laundering and terrorist financing, in violation of Republic Act 10168, "The Terrorism Financing Prevention and Suppression Act." She was penalized with imprisonment of 17 years, four months and one day and to "reclusión perpetua" with P500,000 fine.
