= 2018 Lamitan van bombings =

Bombing incident in Basilan, Philippines

2018 Lamitan bombing
- Part of Moro conflict
- Lamitan City (Philippines) Location of the explosion in Lamitan, Basilan
- Location: Lamitan, Basilan, Philippines
- Date: July 31, 2018; 5:50 (UTC+8)
- Attack type: Bombing
- Weapon: Fertilizer bomb (possibly remote controlled)
- Deaths: 10
- Injuries: 7
- Assailant: Abu Sayyaf

On July 31, 2018, a bomb exploded in the town of Lamitan in Basilan, Philippines.

== Incident ==
A white van carrying explosives was asked to stop at the Magkawit detachment, a security checkpoint situated at the converging boundaries of barangays Bulanting, Colonia, and Maganda in Lamitan, Basilan mainly manned by the Civilian Armed Forces Geographical Unit (CAFGU).

The flagged down van which was to travel to Lamitan city proper exploded at around 5:50 am when soldiers requested the driver to disembark. The vehicle was left obliterated and left a crater and the blast could be heard as far as 5 kilometers (3.1 mi) away.

== Casualties ==
Ten people died from the explosions with five of them being member of the CAFGU. Four victims, all family relatives of CAFGU members, and a non-CAFGU soldier were also among the dead. Two CAFGU members and five Scout Rangers from the Philippine Army were also left wounded by the explosion. Three goats grazing nearby were also killed.

== Bomb ==
An initial investigation concluded that the bombing was a result of an improvised explosive bomb made of ammonium nitrate mixed with fuel oil. The bomb was found to be similar to the one used in the 2013 Cotabato City bombing.

== Investigation ==
=== Possible perpetrators ===
==== Islamic State of Iraq and Syria (ISIS) ====
The militant group, Islamic State of Iraq and Syria (ISIS) claimed responsibility for the incident which it claimed as a suicide bombing. The ISIS-affiliated Amaq News Agency, dubbed the bombing "a martyrdom operation". It said that the supposed suicide attack was made by Abu Khatir Al-Maghribi, a Moroccan national. Rommel Banlaoi of the Philippine Institute for Peace, Violence and Terrorism Research initially believed that the bombing could be an ISIS-directed attack.

Local authorities are leaning on the idea that the attack was not a suicide attack contrary to ISIS' claim. According to their initial investigation. The driver of the van stopped 60 meters (200 ft) from the checkpoint and asked for the people in the checkpoint to help push the vehicle. Investigators reasoned if the driver intended a suicide attack, they could have rammed the vehicle towards the checkpoint. The 20 minute gap between the stoppage of the van and the explosion was also noted by investigators. A burnt cover of a mobile phone was retrieved from the blast site. Banlaoi used this evidence to discount ISIS' claim that the attack was a suicide attack.

The Armed Forces of the Philippines are skeptical of ISIS' claims and points out that the identity of the driver whose corpse was left in a bad state is yet to be identified. The military says that ground sources points to the identity of the driver being non-foreign. However, the military is not ruling out ISIS responsibility for the attack.

==== Abu Sayyaf ====
The Philippine military considers the Abu Sayyaf as its primary suspects for the bombing incident saying it has received "persistent reports" that the group was responsible for the attack. The militant group has three "hardcore" commanders in Basilan namely Furudji Indama, Radzmil Janatul, and Jobel Abdullah.

Since August 1, 2018, text messages began to circulate alleging Abu Sayaff militant, Fathy "Mike" Lijal, an ethnic Yakan to be behind the bombing. The Western Mindanao Command of the military and the Philippine National Police are looking into the faction Lijal is part of and is confident that he has support from sources abroad. On July 30, 2018, prior to the incident the military received information that eight Abu Sayyaf militants led by Lijal were sighted in Barangay Languyan in the town of Mohammad Ajul. 11 Abu Sayyaf gunmen from Sulu were also sighted in the town within the same day.

Another report alleged that a Moroccan militant Abu Kathir al-Maghribi was behind the bombing who left his two sons under the custody of Abu Sayaff commander Hajan Sawadjaan before he detonated himself.

== Possible motive ==
City officials suspects that the driver of the van planned to bomb a parade of at least 2,000 school children and teachers commemorating the national nutrition month. The event was deemed a success even as news of the bombing spread in the city causing tension among the event's participants.

Julkipli Wadi, chair of the University of the Philippines-Institute of Islamic Studies has connected the Moro Islamic Liberation Front's (MILF) integration process with the government as part of the peace process following the Comprehensive Agreement on the Bangsamoro and the signing of the Bangsamoro Organic Law to the attack. He said as the MILF integrate with the government, other radical militant groups may take advantage of the resulting power vacuum in the areas the MILF formerly controlled and points to the Basilan attack as an example. Rommel Banlaoi of Philippine Institute for Peace, Violence and Terrorism Research said the attack was an effort by extremist to sabotage the peace process.
