= 2019 Indanan bombings =

Terrorist incident in the Philippines

- Part of Moro conflict
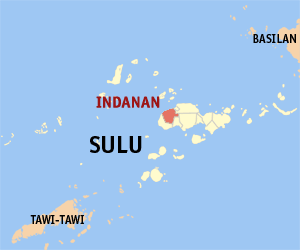
- Location: Indanan, Sulu, Philippines
- Date: 28 June 2019
- Target: Philippines military
- Attack type: Suicide bombing
- Deaths: 6 (+2 perpetrators)
- Injuries: 24

The 2019 Indanan bombings occurred on 28 June 2019, when two suicide bombers detonated their explosives in two areas of a military camp in Indanan, Sulu, Philippines killing three soldiers and three civilians. The Philippine military confirmed it was two suicide bombers that caused the attack. They also believed that the attack was conducted in a similar manner to an attack on a cathedral in Jolo in January 2019. The military also blames the Abu Sayyaf for the earlier attack.

== Bombings ==
The attacks took place at a tactical command post of the 1st Brigade Combat Team of the Philippine Army in Barangay Kajatian. The first bomber detonated their improvised explosive device while being inspected at the military facility's gate while a second bomber described as an individual with a short stature wearing black and a bonnet ran into the camp shortly after the first attack. Soldiers fired shots at the second bomber who dropped to the ground causing the bomb he was wearing to detonated. The bomber was believed to be heading to the camp's barracks where there was an ongoing ceremony at the time of the attacks.

Aside from the two bombers, the blasts killed six others; three soldiers and three civilians. 14 other soldiers were left injured.

== Perpetrators ==
One of the perpetrators of the bombings was a 23 year old Filipino militant who was a member of an Abu Sayyaf faction led by Hajan Sawadjaan. The individual was identified as a first case of a Filipino national carrying a suicide attack in the country which is a cause of concern by authorities. The Filipino militant was the one responsible for the first explosion at the military camp's gate.

The other bomber was characterized as a person with Caucasian features and of Moroccan descent. The identity of the second bomber was a presumption by the military from visual assessment of troops and the viewing of old videos of two Moroccan boys under the custody of Sawadjaan after their father detonated himself in the 2018 Lamitan bombing.

The Islamic State of Iraq and the Levant also claimed credit for the bombings.

== Reactions ==
=== Domestic ===
President Rodrigo Duterte conferred posthumous recognition to the three soldier casualties. The soldiers who died as a result of the attack were awarded the Order of Lapu-Lapu, Rank of Kalasag. He also paid a visit to 14 soldiers injured from the attack.

Defence Secretary Delfin Lorenzana voiced concern regarding the frequency of suicide bombings in the country after the Indanan bombings followed the 2018 Lamitan and January 2019 Jolo Cathedral bombings which were believed to be suicide attacks.

Personnel of the Army 1st Brigade Combat Team stationed elsewhere were deployed in Sulu to boost security efforts in the area.

=== Security analysts ===
Some security analysts from outside the Philippines noted of the attack. Zachary Abuza of the National War College in Washington described the Indanan bombings as an escalation but added that it is also a "sign of increased radicalization" while Sidney Jones said the incident brought a "lethal new ideology" in the country. Jones described that the influence of the noted that Islamic State of Iraq and the Levant's influence in the Philippines "remains strong" citing the recent suicide bombings in the country and recent propaganda videos of the group. But Dr. Rommel C. Banlaoi, Chairman of the Philippine Institute for Peace, Violence and Terrorism Research (PIPVTR) and former Professor of Political Science at the National Defense College of the Philippines, argues that a suicide bombing involving a Filipino is no longer surprising as the Tausugs in Mindanao have the long history of suicide attacks during the Spanish and American colonial occupations. Dr. Banlaoi also warns that the successive incidents of suicide bombings in the country are indications that suicide terrorism is the newest face of threat in the Philippines and everybody should do their part to counter it. As early as 2006, Dr. Banlaoi was already warning about the possibility of suicide terrorism in the Philippines involving a Filipino.
