= Abdullah Maute =

Filipino Islamist militant (1968–2017)

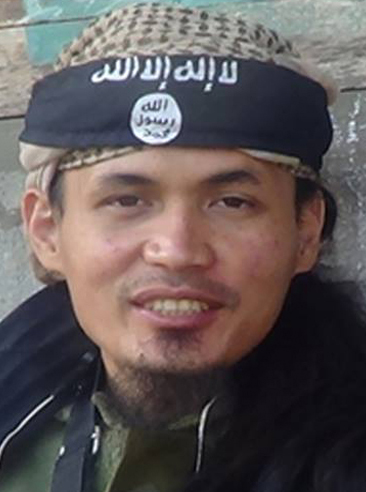
- Abdullah Maute as depicted in a wanted poster published by the Philippine National Police
- Born: Abdullah Romato Maute; 1979; Butig, Lanao del Sur, Philippines
- Died: August 7, 2017 (aged 37–38); Marawi, Philippines
- Other name: Sheik Al Miyahad Abu Al Hassan
- Years active: 2013–2017
- Known for: Co-founding the Maute group

Abdullah Maute (1979 – August 7, 2017), known by his nom de guerre Sheik Al Miyahad Abu Al Hassan, was a Filipino Islamist militant who co-founded, along with his brother Omar Maute, a Dawlah Islamiyah (Islamic state) group in Mindanao, Philippines commonly known as the Wahhabi based Maute group after their surname.

On September 4, 2017, the Philippine military announced that Maute had been killed in an airstrike on August 7, 2017, during the Battle of Marawi. They cited ISIL sympathizers proclaiming his death as an act of martyrdom on the social media platform Telegram. He was referred to as "Sheik Al Miyahad Abu Al Hassan", an alias he was known to have used within the ISIL network. AFP Western Mindanao Command chief Carlito Galvez Jr. confirmed deaths of all seven Maute brothers in December 2017.

== Early life and education ==
Siblings Omar and Abdullah Maute are descended from a Maranao warrior clan based in Butig, Lanao del Sur, the town where they were born and spent their childhood. They were born to Cayamora and Farhana Maute.

The brothers had worked in the Middle East as Overseas Filipino Workers. While working for secular schools in Syria and the United Arab Emirates, the brothers studied Islamic theology. Abdullah reportedly was educated in Jordan.

== Militant activity ==
=== MILF ===
Philippine military sources state that the siblings' father, Cayamora Maute, was a senior official of the Moro Islamic Liberation Front (MILF). After the MILF began to engage in peace negotiations with the Philippine government, the brothers criticized the MILF leadership and pledged allegiance to ISIS.

=== Maute group ===
The Mautes, according to their relatives, later established connections with Ameril Umbra Kato, the founder of the Bangsamoro Islamic Freedom Fighters (BIFF) since both groups follow Wahhabism. The siblings reportedly sent representatives to Kato after the BIFF leader suffered a hypertensive stroke which rendered the left portion of his body paralyzed. After forging ties with Kato, the Mautes established the Maute group. Five other brothers also became involved in the group according to the Philippine military.

==== Battle of Marawi and death ====
On June 10, 2017, during the Marawi crisis, the Philippine Army claimed that the Maute brothers had been killed in a firefight, although details were not available. On September 4, 2017, the military announced that Abdullah was killed on August 7, 2017, in an airstrike. They cited ISIL sympathizers proclaiming his death as an act of martyrdom on the social media platform Telegram. He was referred to as "Sheik Al Miyahad Abu Al Hassan", the name he was known to have used within the ISIL network. In September 2017, the military stated that Omar alone among the seven Maute brothers remained alive, as the other six were killed in battle.

AFP Western Mindanao Command chief Lt. Gen. Carlito Galvez Jr. confirmed in December 2017 that all seven Maute brothers had been killed by the Philippine Army.

== Personal life ==
His mother, Ominta Romato Maute, also known as Farhana Maute, has been described by some sources as the financier of the Maute group's activities, providing logistics and recruiting fighters. She was arrested on June 9, 2017, in Lanao del Sur. Her husband, Cayamora Maute, was arrested the day before in Davao City. Cayamora Maute died in August 2017 on the way to Taguig-Pateros District Hospital after experiencing difficulty in breathing.
