= Adiong =

Adiong is a surname. Notable people with the surname include:

- Ansaruddin Alonto Adiong (born 1969), Filipino politician
- Mamintal Adiong Jr. (born 1965), Filipino politician
- Mamintal Adiong Sr. (1936–2004), Filipino politician
- Nassef Manabilang Adiong (born 1985), Filipino academic
- Soraya Bedjora Adiong (1944–2024), Filipino politician
