= 2007 Philippine gubernatorial elections =

- May 14, 2007

All 80 provincial governorships
	First party	Second party
Party	Lakas	KAMPI
Last election	39	0
Seats before	39	8
Seats after	40	14
Seat change	▲1	▲6
	Third party	Fourth party
Party	NPC	Liberal
Last election	12	8
Seats before	12	11
Seats after	9	9
Seat change	▼3	▼2
President of the League of Provinces of the Philippines before election
Erico Aumentado (Bohol)
Lakas
Elected President of the League of Provinces of the Philippines
Loreto Leo Ocampos (Misamis Occidental)
Lakas

Gubernatorial elections were held in the Philippines on May 14, 2007. All provinces elected their provincial governors for three-year terms that will begin on June 30, 2007. Governors that are currently serving their third consecutive terms are prohibited from running as governors (they may run in any other position).

Highly urbanized cities and independent component cities such as Zamboanga City, Angeles City and Cebu City, and including Metro Manila and the municipality of Pateros are outside the jurisdiction of any province and thus won't elect for governors of their mother provinces (Pampanga and Cebu, for Angeles and Cebu City). They, along with Metro Manila would elect mayors instead.

== Summary ==
Party	2004 elections	Before elections	Gains	Holds	Losses	Total	%	Change (vs. before)
Lakas	39	39	12	28	12	40	50.0%	▲1
KAMPI	—N/a	8	7	7	1	14	17.5%	▲6
NPC	12	12	1	8	4	9	11.25%	▼3
Liberal	8	11	2	7	3	9	11.25%	▼2
LDP	7	2	0	2	0	2	2.5%	Steady
Nacionalista	2	1	0	1	0	1	1.25%	Steady
KBL	1	1	0	0	0	0	0.0%	▼1
PDSP	1	1	0	0	1	0	0.0%	▼1
UNO	—N/a	1	0	0	1	0	0.0%	▼1
Aksyon	1	0	0	0	0	0	0.0%	Steady
PMP	3	0	0	0	0	0	0.0%	Steady
Local parties	2	2	0	1	1	1	1.25%	▼1
Independent	2	1	4	0	1	4	5.0%	▲3
Totals	79	79	27	53	25	80	100%	▲1

== Luzon ==
=== Ilocos Region ===
==== Ilocos Norte ====
Incumbent Bongbong Marcos is term limited and will ran for 2nd district representative. His cousin Michael Marcos Keon will run in his place.

Ilocos Norte gubernatorial election
Candidate	Party	Votes	%
Michael Marcos Keon	Kabalikat ng Malayang Pilipino	150,555	63.55
Rodolfo Fariñas	Nationalist People's Coalition	86,363	36.45
Total		236,918	100.00
Kabalikat ng Malayang Pilipino gain from Kilusang Bagong Lipunan			

==== Ilocos Sur ====
Incumbent Chavit Singson will not run for reelection and is running for Senator.

Ilocos Sur gubernatorial election
Candidate	Party	Votes	%
Deogracias Victor Savellano	Lakas–CMD	132,656	50.15
Efren Rafanan	Pwersa ng Masang Pilipino	131,264	49.62
Roque Sison	Independent	620	0.23
Total		264,540	100.00
Lakas–CMD hold			

==== La Union ====
Incumbent Victor Ortega is not running for reelection. His brother, 2nd district representative Manuel Ortega will run in his place.

La Union gubernatorial election
Candidate	Party	Votes	%
Manuel Ortega	Nationalist People's Coalition	154,870	57.82
Tomas Dumpit	Kabalikat ng Malayang Pilipino	105,473	39.37
Carlos Ortega	Independent	6,665	2.49
Jesus Balingit	Independent	863	0.32
Total		267,871	100.00
Nationalist People's Coalition hold			

==== Pangasinan ====
Incumbent Victor Agbayani is term limited and is running for 2nd district representative. His wife, Jamie Eloise Agbayani ran in his stead. She faced five candidates including Vice Governor Oscar Lambino and 2nd district representative Amado Espino Jr.

She would lose the elections.

Pangasinan gubernatorial election
Candidate	Party	Votes	%
Amado Espino Jr.	Kabalikat ng Malayang Pilipino	427,364	46.55
Jamie Eloise Agbayani	Independent	391,277	42.62
Oscar Lambino	Lakas–CMD	97,675	10.64
Reynaldo Sebastian	Independent	655	0.07
Bartollome Padilla	Independent	653	0.07
Modesto Capulong	Independent	448	0.05
Total		918,072	100.00
Lakas–CMD gain from Independent			

=== Cagayan Valley ===
==== Batanes ====
Batanes gubernatorial election
Candidate	Party	Votes	%
Telesforo Castillejos	Lakas–CMD	4,893	61.40
Manuel Viola	Liberal Party	3,076	38.60
Total		7,969	100.00
Lakas–CMD gain from Liberal Party			

==== Cagayan ====
Incumbent Edgar Lara is running for reelection. His main opponent is Alcala mayor Alvaro Antonio.

Cagayan gubernatorial election
Candidate	Party	Votes	%
Alvaro Antonio	Lakas–CMD	175,484	49.71
Edgar Lara (incumbent)	Nationalist People's Coalition	174,822	49.52
Joven delos Santos	Independent	1,074	0.30
Jose Perez	Independent	801	0.23
Sherwin Calimag	Independent	508	0.14
Eladio Espinosa	Independent	357	0.10
Total		353,046	100.00
Lakas–CMD gain from Nationalist People's Coalition			

==== Isabela ====
Incumbent Grace Padaca is running for reelection. She will face former Governor Benjamin Dy.

Isabela gubernatorial election
Candidate	Party	Votes	%
Grace Padaca (incumbent)	Liberal Party	237,128	52.55
Benjamin Dy	Nationalist People's Coalition	214,150	47.45
Total		451,278	100.00
Liberal Party hold			

==== Nueva Vizcaya ====
Incumbent Luisa Cuaresma is running for reelection against former Governor Rodolfo Agbayani.

Nueva Vizcaya gubernatorial election
Candidate	Party	Votes	%
Luisa Cuaresma (incumbent)	Nacionalista Party	83,643	57.60
Rodolfo Agbayani	Kabalikat ng Malayang Pilipino	61,571	42.40
Total		145,214	100.00
Nacionalista Party hold			

==== Quirino ====
Incumbent Pedro Bacani is not running for reelection. His seat will be contested by Vice Governor Dakila Cua and board member Eleazar Balderas.

Quirino gubernatorial election
Candidate	Party	Votes	%
Dakila Cua	Lakas–CMD	33,477	56.55
Eleazar Balderas	Nationalist People's Coalition	25,723	43.45
Total		59,200	100.00
Lakas–CMD gain from the Liberal Party			

=== Cordillera Administrative Region ===
==== Abra ====
Incumbent Vicente Valera will not run for reelection. His wife, Maria Zita Valera is running in his place.

She would lose the elections to Eustaquio Bersamin, brother of slained representative Luis Bersamin Jr.

Abra gubernatorial election
Candidate	Party	Votes	%
Eustaquio Bersamin	Kabalikat ng Malayang Pilipino	59,557	60.81
Maria Zita Valera	Partido Demokratiko Sosyalista ng Pilipinas	38,377	39.19
Total		97,934	100.00
Kabalikat ng Malayang Pilipino gain from Partido Demokratiko Sosyalista ng Pilipinas			

==== Apayao ====
Apayao gubernatorial election
Candidate	Party	Votes	%
Elias Bulut Sr.	Kabalikat ng Malayang Pilipino	32,507	90.22
Amado Almazan	Independent	3,525	9.78
Total		36,032	100.00
Kabalikat ng Malayang Pilipino hold			

==== Benguet ====
Benguet gubernatorial election
Candidate	Party	Votes	%
Nestor Fongwan	Kabalikat ng Malayang Pilipino	55,802	45.24
Borromeo Melchor (incumbent)	Lakas–CMD	46,758	37.91
Edna Tabanda	Laban ng Demokratikong Pilipino	20,793	16.86
Total		123,353	100.00
Kabalikat ng Malayang Pilipino gain from Lakas–CMD			

==== Ifugao ====
Ifugao gubernatorial election
Candidate	Party	Votes	%
Teddy Baguilat	Liberal Party	24,506	35.47
Glenn Prudenciano (incumbent)	Lakas–CMD	22,341	32.33
Eugene Balitang	Laban ng Demokratikong Pilipino	22,251	32.20
Total		69,098	100.00
Liberal Party gain from Lakas–CMD			

==== Kalinga ====
Incumbent Dominador Belac is not running for reelection. His seat will be contested by three candidates, including former Governor and representative Laurence Wacnang and Floydelia Diasen, who substituted her husband, Vice Governor Rommel Diasen who was killed on April 7.

Kalinga gubernatorial election
Candidate	Party	Votes	%
Floydelia Diasen	Lakas–CMD	52,897	68.70
Laurence Wacnang (Note: Also a member of Lakas–CMD.)	Liberal Party	23,649	30.71
Warren Luyaben	Independent	451	0.59
Total		76,997	100.00
Lakas–CMD gain from Liberal Party			

==== Mountain Province ====
Mountain Province gubernatorial election
Candidate	Party	Votes	%
Maximo Dalog (incumbent)	Lakas–CMD	27,418	44.36
Bonifacio Lacwasan	Kabalikat ng Malayang Pilipino	23,651	38.27
Harry Dominguez	Independent	10,738	17.37
Total		61,807	100.00
Lakas–CMD hold			

=== Central Luzon ===
==== Aurora ====
Incumbent Bella Angara-Castillo is running for reelection against PUP professor Ruben dela Cruz.

She was reelected.

Aurora gubernatorial election
Candidate	Party	Votes	%
Bella Angara-Castillo (incumbent)	Laban ng Demokratikong Pilipino	50,847	77.76
Ruben dela Cruz	PDP–Laban	14,539	22.24
Total		65,386	100.00
Laban ng Demokratikong Pilipino hold			

==== Bataan ====
Bataan gubernatorial election
Candidate	Party	Votes	%
Enrique Garcia (incumbent)	Lakas–CMD	174,743	59.60
Leonardo Roman	Nationalist People's Coalition	118,437	40.40
Total		293,180	100.00
Lakas–CMD hold			

==== Bulacan ====
Incumbent Josefina dela Cruz is term limited. Her brother, Barangay Duhat, Bocaue barangay chairman Jonjon Mendoza and ex-officio board member is running in her stead. His opponents were former governor Roberto Pagdanganan and incumbent vice governor Aurelio Plamenco.

Bulacan gubernatorial election
Candidate	Party	Votes	%
Jonjon Mendoza	Kabalikat ng Malayang Pilipino	364,566	40.58
Roberto Pagdanganan	Lakas–CMD	348,834	38.83
Aurelio Plamenco (Note: Also a member of Pwersa ng Masang Pilipino.)	United Opposition	183,022	20.37
Ernesto Balite	Independent	1,861	0.21
Total		898,283	100.00
Kabalikat ng Malayang Pilipino gain from Lakas–CMD			

==== Nueva Ecija ====
Incumbent Tomas Joson III is term limited and running for mayor of Cabanatuan. His seat will be contested by his brother, Vice Governor Mariano Cristino Joson and 3rd district representative Aurelio Umali.

Nueva Ecija gubernatorial election
Candidate	Party	Votes	%
Aurelio Umali	Lakas–CMD	434,445	58.02
Mariano Cristino Joson (Note: Also a member of Kabalikat ng Malayang Pilipino.)	Bagong Lakas ng Nueva Ecija	314,335	41.98
Total		748,780	100.00
Lakas–CMD gain from Bagong Lakas ng Nueva Ecija			

==== Pampanga ====
Incumbent Mark Lapid is running for reelection. He will be challenged by five candidates including former Catholic priest Eddie Panlilio, 2nd district board member Lilia Pineda and perennial candidate Elly Pamatong.

Panlilio won the elections.

Pampanga gubernatorial election
Candidate	Party	Votes	%
Eddie Panlilio	Independent	219,706	33.81
Lilia Pineda	Kabalikat ng Malayang Pilipino	218,559	33.63
Mark Lapid (incumbent)	Lakas–CMD	210,875	32.45
Edna Guillermo	Independent	304	0.05
Elly Pamatong	Kilusang Bagong Lipunan	300	0.05
Arnold Maniago	Independent	107	0.02
Total		649,851	100.00
Independent gain from Lakas–CMD			

==== Tarlac ====
Incumbent Jose Yap Sr. is term limited and running for 2nd district representative. His son, Victor Yap will run in his stead.

He won the elections against Philippine Olympic Committee president Peping Cojuangco by 20,410 votes.

Tarlac gubernatorial election
Candidate	Party	Votes	%
Victor Yap	Nationalist People's Coalition	209,913	52.06
Peping Cojuangco	Kabalikat ng Malayang Pilipino	189,503	46.99
Ernesto Espina	Pwersa ng Masang Pilipino	2,599	0.64
Ernesto Calma	Independent	1,227	0.30
Total		403,242	100.00
Nationalist People's Coalition hold			

==== Zambales ====
Incumbent Vicente Magsaysay is term limited and running for Senator. He nominated his son, Jesus Vicente Magsaysay.

Zambales gubernatorial election
Candidate	Party	Votes	%
Amor Deloso	Liberal Party	84,014	47.94
Jesus Vicente Magsaysay	Lakas–CMD	71,138	40.59
Ruben Torres	Pwersa ng Masang Pilipino	19,833	11.32
Teofilo Padua	Independent	254	0.14
Total		175,239	100.00
Liberal Party gain from Lakas–CMD			

=== Calabarzon ===
==== Batangas ====
Incumbent Armando Sanchez is running for reelection. His main opponent is actress and Lipa mayor Vilma Santos-Recto.

She won the elections.

Batangas gubernatorial election
Candidate	Party	Votes	%
Vilma Santos-Recto	Lakas–CMD	475,740	55.31
Armando Sanchez (incumbent)	Kabalikat ng Malayang Pilipino	344,969	40.11
Nestor Sanares	Pwersa ng Masang Pilipino	34,606	4.02
Marcos Mandanas Sr.	Independent	4,797	0.56
Total		860,112	100.00
Lakas–CMD gain from Kabalikat ng Malayang Pilipino			

==== Cavite ====
Cavite gubernatorial election
Candidate	Party	Votes	%
Ayong Maliksi (incumbent)	Liberal Party	695,220	96.55
Arsenio Gadang	Independent	24,835	3.45
Total		720,055	100.00
Liberal Party hold			

==== Laguna ====
Incumbent Teresita Lazaro is running for reelection. Her main opponent is Vice Governor Edwin Olivarez.

Laguna gubernatorial election
Candidate	Party	Votes	%
Teresita Lazaro (incumbent)	Lakas–CMD	425,732	52.13
Edwin Olivarez	United Opposition	390,891	47.87
Total		816,623	100.00
Lakas–CMD hold			

==== Quezon ====
Incumbent Rafael Nantes is running for reelection. His main opponent is Vice Governor David Suarez.

Quezon gubernatorial election
Candidate	Party	Votes	%
Rafael Nantes (incumbent)	Liberal Party	307,754	51.23
David Suarez	Kabalikat ng Malayang Pilipino	292,930	48.77
Total		600,684	100.00
Liberal Party hold			

==== Rizal ====
Rizal gubernatorial election
Candidate	Party	Votes	%
Casimiro Ynares III	Nationalist People's Coalition	526,695	94.72
Wilfredo Torres	Independent	29,365	5.28
Total		556,060	100.00
Nationalist People's Coalition hold			

=== Mimaropa ===
==== Marinduque ====
Incumbent Carmencita Reyes is term limited and ran for Congress.

Marinduque gubernatorial election
Candidate	Party	Votes	%
Jose Antonio Carrion	Independent	25,276	29.61
Percival Morales	Lakas–CMD	24,154	28.29
Wilfredo Red	Independent	16,464	19.29
Melecio Go	Kabalikat ng Malayang Pilipino	11,297	13.23
Narciso Daquioag	Independent	8,159	9.56
Pedrito Nepomuceno	Kabalikat ng Malayang Pilipino	22	0.03
Total		85,372	100.00
Independent gain from Lakas–CMD			

==== Occidental Mindoro ====
Occidental Mindoro gubernatorial election
Candidate	Party	Votes	%
Josephine Sato (incumbent)	Nationalist People's Coalition	78,753	58.08
Ronilo Omanio	Independent	56,837	41.92
Total		135,590	100.00
Nationalist People's Coalition hold			

==== Oriental Mindoro ====
Oriental Mindoro gubernatorial election
Candidate	Party	Votes	%
Arnan Panaligan (incumbent)	Lakas–CMD	168,127	69.41
Marpheo Marasigan	Pwersa ng Masang Pilipino	74,100	30.59
Total		242,227	100.00
Lakas–CMD hold			

==== Palawan ====
Palawan gubernatorial election
Candidate	Party	Votes	%
Mario Joel Reyes (incumbent)	Lakas–CMD	251,206	98.04
Andrei Acosta	Independent	4,418	1.72
Edmundo Katon	Independent	597	0.23
Total		256,221	100.00
Lakas–CMD hold			

==== Romblon ====
Romblon gubernatorial election
Candidate	Party	Votes	%
Natalio Beltran III	Lakas–CMD	46,677	45.88
Armando Guttierez	Kabalikat ng Malayang Pilipino	33,485	32.92
Samuel Romero	Independent	13,297	13.07
Venizar Maravilla	United Opposition	5,933	5.83
Telesforo Gaan	Independent	2,338	2.30
Total		101,730	100.00
Lakas–CMD gain from Nationalist People's Coalition			

=== Bicol Region ===
==== Albay ====
Incumbent Fernando Gonzalez is running for reelection. His main opponent is former Governor and former Malacañang Chief of Staff Joey Salceda.

Albay gubernatorial election
Candidate	Party	Votes	%
Joey Salceda	Independent	236,529	53.21
Fernando Gonzalez (incumbent)	Lakas–CMD	199,873	44.96
Stephen Bichara	Independent	7,536	1.70
Abdel Noel Quiapon	Independent	601	0.14
Total		444,539	100.00
Independent gain from Lakas–CMD			

==== Camarines Norte ====
Camarines Norte gubernatorial election
Candidate	Party	Votes	%
Jesus Typoco Jr. (incumbent)	Lakas–CMD	80,830	50.80
Edgar Tallado (Note: Also a member of Nationalist People's Coalition.)	United Opposition	78,287	49.20
Total		159,117	100.00
Lakas–CMD hold			

==== Camarines Sur ====
Camarines Sur gubernatorial election
Candidate	Party	Votes	%
Luis Raymond Villafuerte (incumbent)	Lakas–CMD	322,716	70.35
Eduardo Pilapil	Kabalikat ng Malayang Pilipino	136,018	29.65
Total		458,734	100.00
Lakas–CMD hold			

==== Catanduanes ====
Catanduanes gubernatorial election
Candidate	Party	Votes	%
Joseph Cua	Independent	53,087	53.15
Leandro Verceles Jr. (incumbent)	Lakas–CMD	46,796	46.85
Total		99,883	100.00
Independent gain from Lakas–CMD			

==== Masbate ====
Masbate gubernatorial election
Candidate	Party	Votes	%
Elisa Olga Kho	Lakas–CMD	129,774	52.54
Emilio Espinosa Jr.	Nationalist People's Coalition	105,988	42.91
Armando Sañano	Partido Demokratiko Sosyalista ng Pilipinas	11,216	4.54
Total		246,978	100.00
Lakas–CMD hold			

==== Sorsogon ====
Sorsogon gubernatorial election
Candidate	Party	Votes	%
Sally Ante Lee	Lakas–CMD	99,685	45.96
Jose Edwin Hamor	Nacionalista Party	86,685	39.97
Antonio Escudero Jr.	United Opposition	30,515	14.07
Total		216,885	100.00
Lakas–CMD hold			

== Visayas ==
=== Western Visayas ===
==== Aklan ====
Aklan gubernatorial election
Candidate	Party	Votes	%
Carlito Marquez (incumbent)	Lakas–CMD	90,623	45.53
Victoria Ramos	United Opposition	72,339	36.34
Maria Bettina Garcia	PDP–Laban	34,947	17.56
Kareen Grace Galvan	Pwersa ng Masang Pilipino	1,153	0.58
Total		199,062	100.00
Lakas–CMD hold			

==== Antique ====
Antique gubernatorial election
Candidate	Party	Votes	%
Salvacion Z. Perez (incumbent)	Nationalist People's Coalition	68,867	38.48
Arturo Pacificador	Kilusang Bagong Lipunan	55,502	31.01
Jovito Plameras Jr.	Lakas–CMD	54,602	30.51
Total		178,971	100.00
Nationalist People's Coalition hold			

==== Capiz ====
Capiz gubernatorial election
Candidate	Party	Votes	%
Victor Tanco	Liberal Party	189,509	98.26
Zenon Amoroso	Independent	3,364	1.74
Total		192,873	100.00
Liberal Party hold			

==== Guimaras ====
Guimaras gubernatorial election
Candidate	Party	Votes	%
Felipe Hilan Nava	Kabalikat ng Malayang Pilipino	43,288	66.16
Bernie Miaque	Kabalikat ng Malayang Pilipino	22,144	33.84
Total		65,432	100.00
Kabalikat ng Malayang Pilipino gain from Lakas–CMD			

==== Iloilo ====
Incumbent Niel Tupas Sr. is running for reelection. His main opponent is Vice Governor Roberto Armada.

Tupas was reelected.

Iloilo gubernatorial election
Candidate	Party	Votes	%
Niel Tupas Sr. (incumbent)	Liberal Party	404,484	67.09
Roberto Armada	Lakas–CMD	196,441	32.58
Serapio Camposano	Independent	1,966	0.33
Total		602,891	100.00
Liberal Party hold			

==== Negros Occidental ====
Negros Occidental gubernatorial election
Candidate	Party	Votes	%
Joseph Marañon (incumbent)	Nationalist People's Coalition	618,964	97.99
German Valladarez	Independent	6,780	1.07
Luisito Tribaco	Kilusang Bagong Lipunan	5,938	0.94
Total		631,682	100.00
Nationalist People's Coalition hold			

=== Central Visayas ===
==== Bohol ====
Bohol gubernatorial election
Candidate	Party	Votes	%
Erico Aumentado (incumbent)	Lakas–CMD	397,849	93.38
Roberto Cericos	PDP–Laban	10,816	2.54
Renato Dalay	Independent	8,866	2.08
Mario Magat Jr.	Kabalikat ng Malayang Pilipino	6,657	1.56
Teofanes Dumaluan	Independent	1,463	0.34
Peter Pelegrino	Independent	397	0.09
Total		426,048	100.00
Lakas–CMD hold			

==== Cebu ====
Incumbent Gwendolyn Garcia is running for reelection. His main opponent is 3rd district representative Antonio Yapha Jr.

She was reelected.

Cebu gubernatorial election
Candidate	Party	Votes	%
Gwendolyn Garcia (incumbent)	Kabalikat ng Malayang Pilipino	757,356	70.25
Antonio Yapha Jr.	Partido Demokratiko Sosyalista ng Pilipinas	304,473	28.24
Mary Joyce Osmeña	Independent	14,538	1.35
Rolando Lejarde	Independent	1,679	0.16
Total		1,078,046	100.00
Kabalikat ng Malayang Pilipino hold			

==== Negros Oriental ====
Negros Oriental gubernatorial election
Candidate	Party	Votes	%
Emilio Macias	Nationalist People's Coalition	275,163	97.87
Samuel Torres	Liberal Party	5,981	2.13
Total		281,144	100.00
Nationalist People's Coalition hold			

==== Siquijor ====
Siquijor gubernatorial election
Candidate	Party	Votes	%
Orlando Fua Jr.	Lakas–CMD	36,362	80.29
Ben Aquino	United Opposition	8,925	19.71
Total		45,287	100.00
Lakas–CMD hold			

=== Eastern Visayas ===
==== Biliran ====
Biliran gubernatorial election
Candidate	Party	Votes	%
Rogelio Espina (incumbent)	Lakas–CMD	43,007	68.59
Ruben Almadro	Liberal Party	19,415	30.96
Edgardo Ambe	Independent	280	0.45
Total		62,702	100.00
Lakas–CMD hold			

==== Eastern Samar ====
Eastern Samar gubernatorial election
Candidate	Party	Votes	%
Ben Evardone (incumbent)	Lakas–CMD	122,467	84.18
Camilo Camenforte	United Opposition	23,011	15.82
Total		145,478	100.00
Lakas–CMD hold			

==== Leyte ====
Leyte gubernatorial election
Candidate	Party	Votes	%
Jericho Petilla (incumbent)	Lakas–CMD	317,241	95.68
Jimmy Yaokasin Sr.	United Opposition	14,334	4.32
Total		331,575	100.00
Lakas–CMD hold			

==== Northern Samar ====
Northern Samar gubernatorial election
Candidate	Party	Votes	%
Raul Daza (incumbent)	Liberal Party	101,819	50.85
Harlin Abayon	Liberal Party	98,351	49.12
Wenceslao Pancho Jr.	Nationalist People's Coalition	55	0.03
Total		200,225	100.00
Liberal Party hold			

==== Samar ====
Samar gubernatorial election
Candidate	Party	Votes	%
Milagrosa Tan (incumbent)	Kabalikat ng Malayang Pilipino	136,570	62.44
Neliptha Figueroa	Lakas–CMD	81,533	37.28
Virginia San Victores	Pwersa ng Masang Pilipino	603	0.28
Total		218,706	100.00
Kabalikat ng Malayang Pilipino hold			

==== Southern Leyte ====
Southern Leyte gubernatorial election
Candidate	Party	Votes	%
Damian Mercado	Lakas–CMD	85,778	54.35
Marisa Lerias	Nationalist People's Coalition	72,037	45.65
Total		157,815	100.00
Lakas–CMD gain from Nationalist People's Coalition			

== Mindanao ==
=== Zamboanga Peninsula ===
==== Zamboanga del Norte ====
Incumbent Rolando Yebes is running for reelection. His main opponent is Dipolog mayor Roberto Uy.

Compostela Valley gubernatorial election
Candidate	Party	Votes	%
Rolando Yebes (incumbent)	Kabalikat ng Malayang Pilipino	208,480	60.33
Roberto Uy	Lakas–CMD	135,933	39.34
Roberto Yang Uy	Independent	1,161	0.34
Total		345,574	100.00
Kabalikat ng Malayang Pilipino hold			

==== Zamboanga del Sur ====
Incumbent Aurora E. Cerilles is running for reelection.

Compostela Valley gubernatorial election
Candidate	Party	Votes	%
Aurora E. Cerilles (incumbent)	Kabalikat ng Malayang Pilipino	255,568	84.35
Tirsendo Poloyapol	Pwersa ng Masang Pilipino	47,402	15.65
Total		302,970	100.00
Kabalikat ng Malayang Pilipino hold			

==== Zamboanga Sibugay ====
Incumbent George Hofer is running for reelection.

Zamboanga Sibugay gubernatorial election
Candidate	Party	Votes	%
George T. Hofer (incumbent)	Laban ng Demokratikong Pilipino	95,945	55.79
Eric Cabarios	Lakas–CMD	76,034	44.21
Total		171,979	100.00
Laban ng Demokratikong Pilipino hold			

=== Northern Mindanao ===
==== Bukidnon ====
Incumbent Jose Maria Zubiri Jr. is running for reelection. His main opponent is 1st district representative Nereus Acosta.

Bukidnon gubernatorial election
Candidate	Party	Votes	%
Jose Maria Zubiri Jr. (incumbent)	Lakas–CMD	323,238	81.99
Nereus Acosta	Liberal Party	70,993	18.01
Total		394,231	100.00
Lakas–CMD hold			

==== Camiguin ====
Camiguin gubernatorial election
Candidate	Party	Votes	%
Jurdin Jesus Romualdo	Nationalist People's Coalition	25,085	61.02
Antonio Gallardo	Liberal Party	16,027	38.98
Total		41,112	100.00
Nationalist People's Coalition gain from Lakas–CMD			

==== Lanao del Norte ====
Lanao del Norte gubernatorial election
Candidate	Party	Votes	%
Mohamad Khalid Dimaporo	Lakas–CMD	129,714	63.40
Rafael Rizalda	United Opposition	66,856	32.68
Amer Moner Sr.	Independent	7,464	3.65
Michael Sicangco	Independent	564	0.28
Total		204,598	100.00
Lakas–CMD hold			

==== Misamis Occidental ====
Misamis Occidental gubernatorial election
Candidate	Party	Votes	%
Loreto Leo Ocampos (incumbent)	Lakas–CMD	161,360	94.66
Virgilio Sandoval	Independent	9,110	5.34
Total		170,470	100.00
Lakas–CMD hold			

==== Misamis Oriental ====
Incumbent Oscar Moreno is running for reelection. His main opponent is 2nd district representative Augusto Baculio Jr.

Misamis Oriental gubernatorial election
Candidate	Party	Votes	%
Oscar Moreno (incumbent)	Lakas–CMD	198,438	66.33
Augusto Baculio Jr.	Kabalikat ng Malayang Pilipino	100,176	33.49
Manuel Po	Independent	532	0.18
Total		299,146	100.00
Lakas–CMD hold			

=== Davao Region ===
==== Compostela Valley ====
Compostela Valley gubernatorial election
Candidate	Party	Votes	%
Arturo Uy	Lakas–CMD	136,570	62.62
Kristine Mae Caballero	Kabalikat ng Malayang Pilipino	81,533	37.38
Total		218,103	100.00
Lakas–CMD hold			

==== Davao del Norte ====
Incumbent Gelacio Gementiza is running for reelection. His opponents are former Governor and Presidential Adviser for Government Centers Rodolfo del Rosario and Carmen Mayor Jesus Gaviola.

Davao del Norte gubernatorial election
Candidate	Party	Votes	%
Rodolfo del Rosario	Lakas–CMD	197,205	68.53
Gelacio Gementiza (incumbent)	United Opposition	67,471	23.45
Jesus Gaviola	Independent	23,085	8.02
Total		287,761	100.00
Lakas–CMD gain from the United Opposition			

==== Davao del Sur ====
Davao del Sur gubernatorial election
Candidate	Party	Votes	%
Douglas Cagas	Lakas–CMD	148,931	51.23
Claude Bautista	Nationalist People's Coalition	141,335	48.61
Rosemarie Villamor	Independent	472	0.16
Total		290,738	100.00
Lakas–CMD gain from Nationalist People's Coalition			

==== Davao Oriental ====
Incumbent Maria Elena Palma Gil is running for reelection. Her opponent is 1st district representative Corazon Malanyaon.

Davao Oriental gubernatorial election
Candidate	Party	Votes	%
Corazon Malanyaon	Kabalikat ng Malayang Pilipino	106,589	61.93
Maria Elena Palma Gil (incumbent)	Lakas–CMD	65,529	38.07
Total		172,118	100.00
Kabalikat ng Malayang Pilipino gain from Lakas–CMD			

=== Soccsksargen ===
==== Cotabato ====
Incumbent Emmanuel Piñol is term-limited and is running for Vice Governor. His seat will be contested by six candidates including Vice Governor Jesus Sacdalan and Carmen mayor Rogelio Taliño.

Cotabato gubernatorial election
Candidate	Party	Votes	%
Jesus Sacdalan	Lakas–CMD	185,006	52.52
Rogelio Taliño	Kabalikat ng Malayang Pilipino	159,822	45.37
Rene Roldan	Partido Demokratiko Sosyalista ng Pilipinas	4,977	1.41
Wahab Tandual	PDP–Laban	903	0.26
Garcia Makalilay	Independent	877	0.25
Sammy Bale	Independent	653	0.19
Total		352,238	100.00
Lakas–CMD hold			

==== Sarangani ====
Incumbent Miguel Rene Dominguez is running for reelection.

Sarangani gubernatorial election
Candidate	Party	Votes	%
Miguel Rene Dominguez (incumbent)	Sarangani Reconciliation and Reformation Organization	112,145	91.72
Francis Martinez	Independent	10,120	8.28
Total		122,265	100.00
Sarangani Reconciliation and Reformation Organization hold			

==== South Cotabato ====
Incumbent Daisy Avance-Fuentes is running for reelection.

South Cotabato gubernatorial election
Candidate	Party	Votes	%
Daisy Avance-Fuentes (incumbent)	Nationalist People's Coalition	216,900	99.21
Ephraim Defiño Jr.	People's Reform Party	1,462	0.67
Nane Neulid	Independent	271	0.12
Total		218,633	100.00
Nationalist People's Coalition hold			

==== Sultan Kudarat ====
Incumbent Pax Mangudadatu is term limited and running for 1st district representative. His son, Suharto Mangudadatu is running in his place.

Sultan Kudarat gubernatorial election
Candidate	Party	Votes	%
Suharto Mangudadatu	Kabalikat ng Malayang Pilipino	114,221	59.59
Geronimo Arzagon	Nationalist People's Coalition	76,817	40.08
Ephraim Defiño	Independent	645	0.34
Total		191,683	100.00
Kabalikat ng Malayang Pilipino hold			

=== Caraga ===
==== Agusan del Norte ====
Incumbent Erlpe John Amante is running for reelection. His opponent is former Agusan del Sur governor Valentina Plaza.

Agusan del Norte gubernatorial election
Candidate	Party	Votes	%
Erlpe John Amante (incumbent)	Kabalikat ng Malayang Pilipino	79,402	59.40
Valentina Plaza	Lakas–CMD	54,265	40.60
Total		133,667	100.00
Kabalikat ng Malayang Pilipino hold			

==== Agusan del Sur ====
Agusan del Sur gubernatorial election
Candidate	Party	Votes	%
Maria Valentina Plaza	Lakas–CMD	102,848	63.58
Ceferino Paredes Jr.	Kabalikat ng Malayang Pilipino	52,882	32.69
Apolinar Paredes	Independent	6,030	3.73
Total		161,760	100.00
Lakas–CMD hold			

==== Dinagat Islands ====
Acting governor Jade Ecleo is running unopposed.

Dinagat Islands gubernatorial election
Candidate	Party	Votes	%
Jade Ecleo (incumbent)	Lakas–CMD	32,685	100.00
Total		32,685	100.00
Lakas–CMD hold			

==== Surigao del Norte ====
Surigao del Norte gubernatorial election
Candidate	Party	Votes	%
Ace Barbers	Lakas–CMD	103,468	56.89
Danilo Orquina	Kabalikat ng Malayang Pilipino	47,372	26.05
Felimon Napuli	Partido Padajon	30,829	16.95
Sirnante Villar	Independent	198	0.11
Total		181,867	100.00
Lakas–CMD hold			

==== Surigao del Sur ====
Incumbent Vicente Pimentel Jr. is running for reelection.

Surigao del Sur gubernatorial election
Candidate	Party	Votes	%
Vicente Pimentel Jr. (incumbent)	Lakas–CMD	170,091	96.73
Elpidio Salgado	Pwersa ng Masang Pilipino	5,746	3.27
Total		175,837	100.00
Lakas–CMD hold			

=== Autonomous Region in Muslim Mindanao ===
==== Basilan ====
Incumbent Wahab Akbar is term limited and is running for representative. His wife, Jum Jainudin Akbar will run against representative Abdulgani Salapuddin.

Basilan gubernatorial election
Candidate	Party	Votes	%
Jum Jainudin Akbar	Liberal Party	71,171	50.74
Abdulgani Salapuddin	Lakas–CMD	68,295	48.69
Mario Mamang	Liberal Party	583	0.42
Ojong Amil	Independent	227	0.16
Total		140,276	100.00
Liberal Party hold			

==== Lanao del Sur ====
Incumbent Basher Manalao is running for his first full term. His main opponents are second district representative Benasing Macarambon Jr., Marawi mayor Omar Ali and Mamintal Adiong Jr., son of Manalao's predecessor, Mamintal Adiong Sr.

Lanao del Sur gubernatorial election
Candidate	Party	Votes	%
Mamintal Adiong Jr.	Lakas–CMD	111,295	35.74
Omar Ali	Partido Demokratiko Sosyalista ng Pilipinas	105,511	33.89
Benasing Macarambon Jr.	Kabalikat ng Malayang Pilipino	54,768	17.59
Basher Manalao (incumbent)	Liberal Party	35,966	11.55
Kennedy Ismael	Independent	1,858	0.60
Muhammad Omar Malawad	Muslim Reform Party	1,835	0.59
H. Sulayman Sulaiman	Lakas–CMD	55	0.02
Asharie Maonga	Independent	49	0.02
Usop Matuan	Pwersa ng Masang Pilipino	36	0.01
Total		311,373	100.00
Lakas–CMD gain from Liberal Party			

==== Maguindanao ====
Incumbent Andal Ampatuan Sr. is running for reelection unopposed.

Maguindanao gubernatorial election
Candidate	Party	Votes	%
Andal Ampatuan Sr. (incumbent)	Lakas–CMD	182,273	100.00
Total		182,273	100.00
Lakas–CMD hold			

==== Shariff Kabunsuan ====
OIC governor Bimbo Sinsuat is running for his first full term. His opponents are Sultan Kudarat mayor Tucao Mastura and former ARMM governor Zacaria Candao.

Shariff Kabunsuan gubernatorial election
Candidate	Party
Tucao Mastura	Nationalist People's Coalition
Zacaria Candao	Partido Demokratiko Sosyalista ng Pilipinas
Bimbo Sinsuat	Lakas–CMD
Total
Nationalist People's Coalition gain from Lakas–CMD	

==== Sulu ====
Incumbent Benjamin Loong is running for reelection. His opponents are former ARMM governor Nur Misuari and former governor Abdusakur Mahail Tan.

Sulu gubernatorial election
Candidate	Party	Votes	%
Abdusakur Mahail Tan	Kabalikat ng Malayang Pilipino	98,805	53.09
Benjamin Loong (incumbent)	Lakas–CMD	63,091	33.90
Nur Misuari	Kabalikat ng Malayang Pilipino	24,213	13.01
Total		186,109	100.00
Kabalikat ng Malayang Pilipino gain from Lakas–CMD			

==== Tawi-Tawi ====
Incumbent Sadikul Sahali is running for reelection against former Governor Rashidin Matba.

Tawi-Tawi gubernatorial election
Candidate	Party	Votes	%
Sadikul Sahali (incumbent)	Lakas–CMD	56,237	54.32
Rashidin Matba	Kabalikat ng Malayang Pilipino	47,292	45.68
Total		103,529	100.00
Lakas–CMD hold			
