= Maranao people =

Austronesian ethnic group of the southern Philippines

Bangsa Mëranaw ماراناو
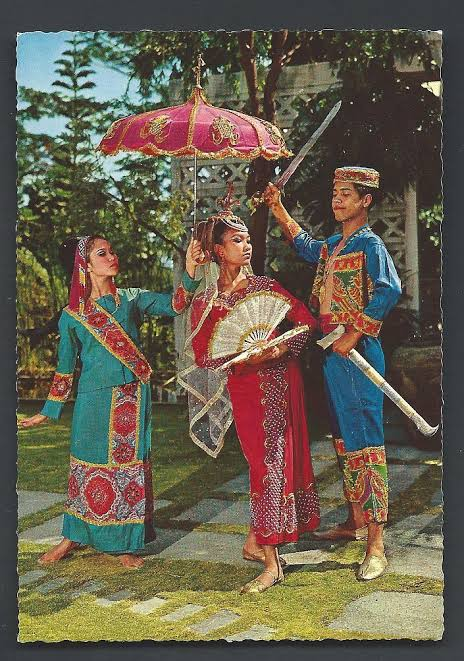
- A group of the Maranao people performing the Singkil dance

Total population
- 1,800,130 (2020 census)

Regions with significant populations
- Philippines (Bangsamoro, Soccsksargen, Zamboanga Peninsula, Northern Mindanao, Manila, Cebu)
- Lanao del Sur: 1,114,765
- Lanao del Norte: 325,804
- Metro Manila: 81,523
- Iligan City: 39,980
- Davao City: 18,545
- General Santos City: 10,065

Languages
- Native; Maranao; Also; Filipino • Cebuano • English

Religion
- Sunni Islam

Related ethnic groups
- Iranun, Maguindanaon, Tiruray; Lumad, Tausūg, Visayan, other Moros, other Filipinos, other Austronesian peoples

The Maranao people (Maranao: Bangsa Mëranaw, Jawi: ماراناو; Filipino: mga Maranaw), also spelled Meranaw, Maranaw, and Mëranaw, is a predominantly Muslim Filipino and Austronesian ethnic group native to the region around Lanao Lake in the island of Mindanao. They are known for their artwork, weaving, wood, plastic and metal crafts and epic literature, the Darangen. They are ethnically and culturally closely related to the Iranun people and Maguindanao people, all three groups being denoted speaking Danao languages and giving name to the island of Mindanao. They are grouped with other Moro people due to their shared religion.

== Etymology ==
The name "Maranao" (also spelled "Mëranaw", or "Maranaw") means "people of the lake" (lanaw or ranaw, archaic danaw, means "lake" in the Maranao language). This is in reference to Lake Lanao, the predominant geographic feature of the ancestral homeland of the Maranao people.

The original endonym of the ancestral Maranao is believed to be "Iranaoan". This group later diverged, resulting in the modern Maguindanaon and the Iranun people (whose names can also be translated to "people of the lake"), while the ancestral Iranaoan who stayed in Lake Lanao became known as the Maranao. These three ethnic groups are still related to each other, share similar cultures and speak languages belonging to the Danao language family.

== Confederate States of Lanao ==
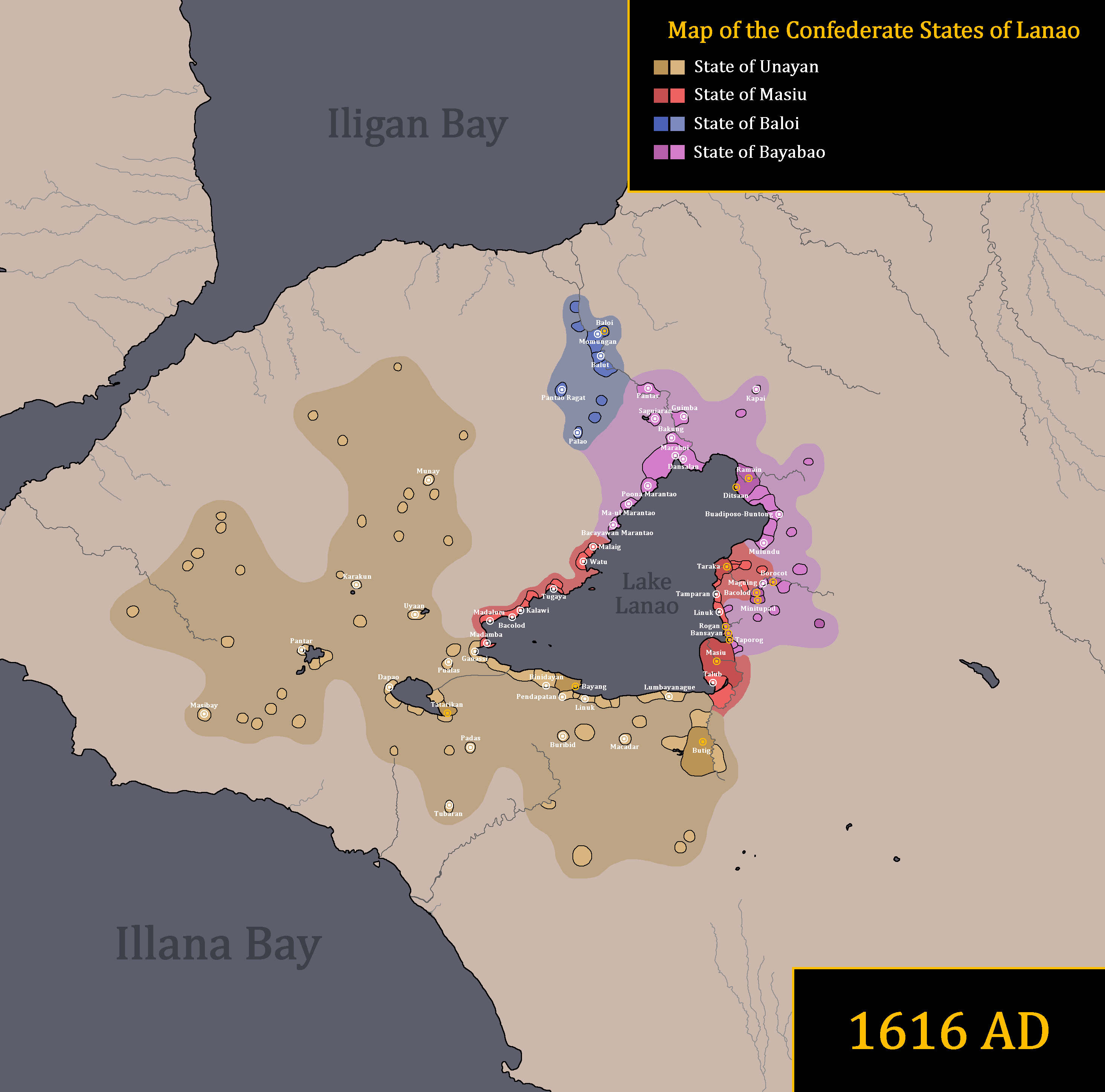
Map of the Confederate States of Lanao (1616-1904), with the State of Unayan colored in yellow, the State of Masiu in red, the State of Bayabao in pink, and the State of Baloi in blue.

The Maranao were the last of the Muslims of the Southern Philippines undergoing Islamization, primarily under the influence of the Arab-Malay missionaries like Sharif Kabungsuwan and other from Borneo.

Like neighboring Moros and the Lumads, during the nominal occupation of the Philippines by the Spanish, and later the American and the Japanese, the Maranao had tribal leaders called datu. In the 16th century, upon the arrival of Islam, they developed into kingdoms with sultans due to the influence of Muslim missionaries.

== Culture ==
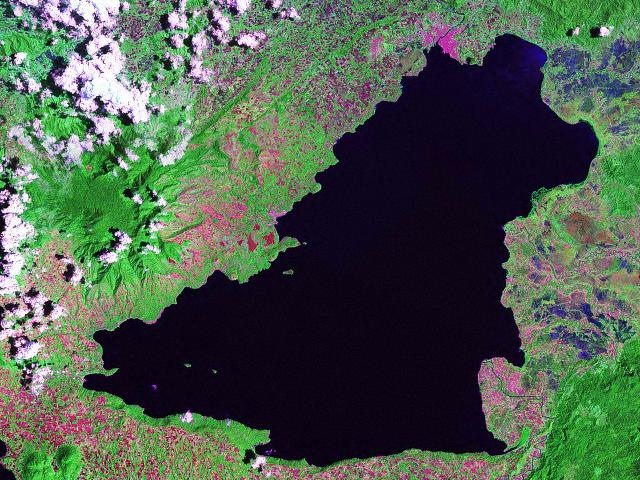
The shores of Lake Lanao is the center of Maranao society.

Maranao culture can be characterized by:

- Lake Lanao
- Sarimanok (Papanoka a Məra or Marapatik)
- Torogan, Maranao royal houses, where the architecture used is the most aesthetic in the Philippines
- Darangən, an epic UNESCO Intangible cultural heritage
- Kirim, pre-Hispanic handwriting based from Arabic letters with 19 consonants and 7 vowels
- Singkil, a Philippine dance based on a scene from the Darangən
- Okir wood and metal carvings
- Kapmorod and Kakhalilang with Sambolayang and Pasandalan a Morog and Marigay for Kazipa sa Manggis
- Kaplagod (racing horses)
- Tabo, a drum used in mosques to call worshippers to prayer

Maranao culture is centered around Lake Lanao, the largest lake in Mindanao, and second-largest and deepest lake in the Philippines. Lanao is the subject of various myths and legends. It supports a major fishery, and powers the hydroelectric plant installed on it; the Agus River system generates 70% of the electricity used by the people of Mindanao. A commanding view of the lake is offered by Marawi City, the provincial capital.

=== Visual arts ===
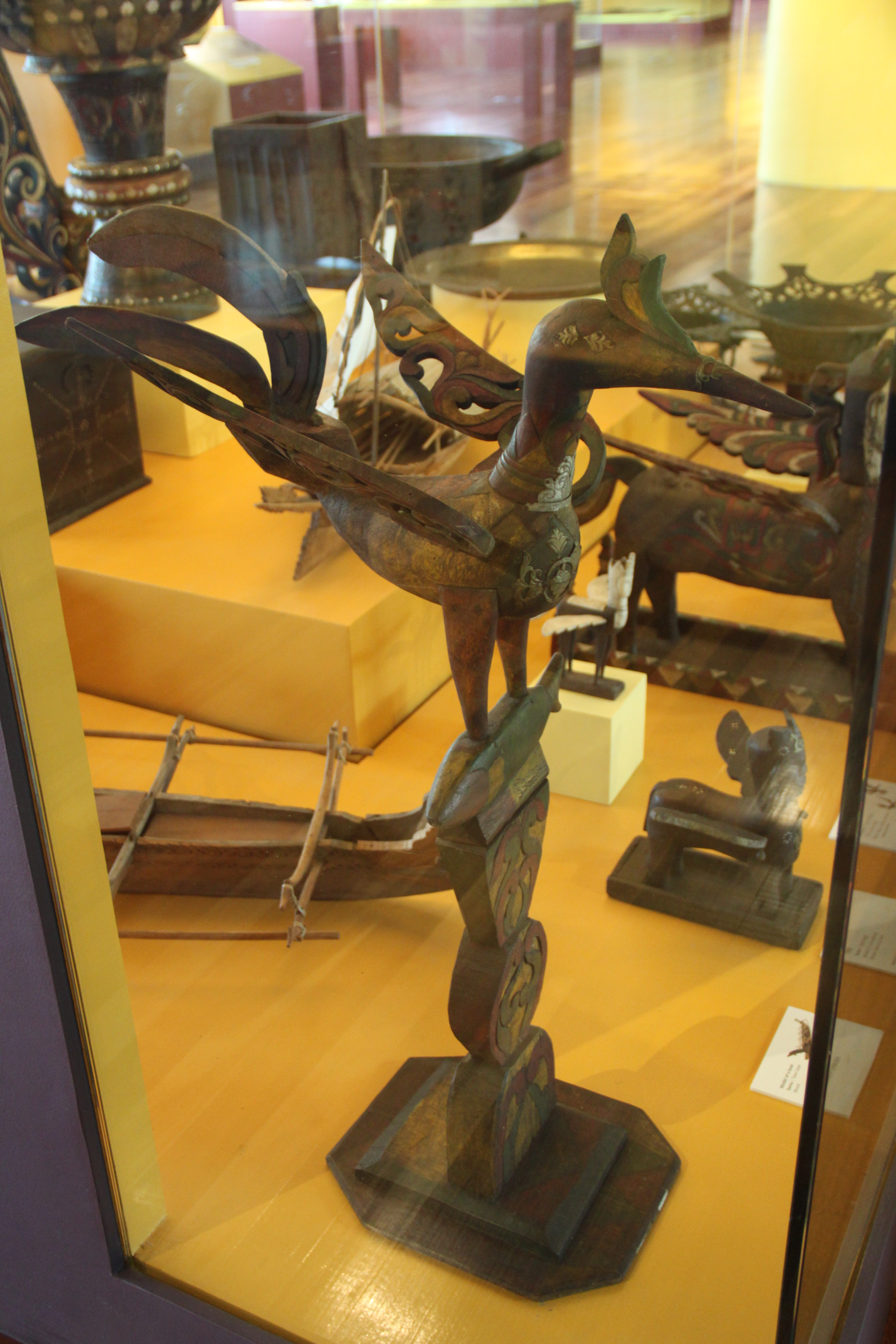
Woodcarving of the Sarimanok with okir motifs

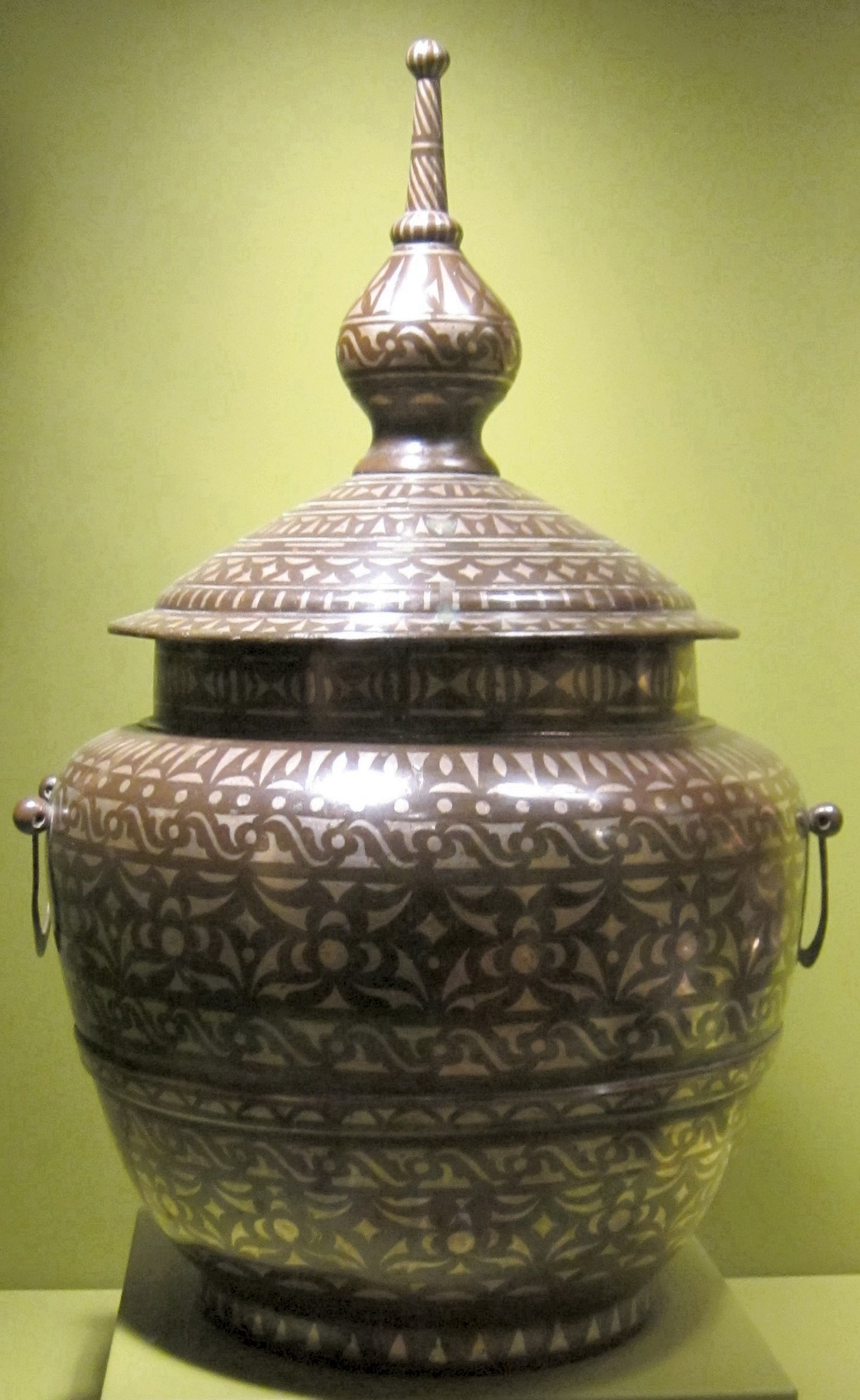
Gadur jar with silver inlay

Sarimanok, Papanok a "Məra" or "Marapatik" is a legendary bird of the Maranao that is a ubiquitous symbol of their art. It is depicted as a Hoodhud (Arabic) with colorful wings and feathered tail, holding a fish on its beak or talons. The head of Sarimanok is like the head of a Hoopoe (Balalatoc in maranaw) and is profusely decorated with scroll, leaf and spiral motifs (okir). It is a symbol of good fortune.

The Maranao have also developed their own adaptation of the Ramayana epic, the Maharadia Lawana. They also have a traditional dance, the Singkil, which was based on another local Ramayana adaptation, the Darangən.

==== Architecture ====
Traditional Maranao architecture, like elsewhere in the Philippines and at large maritime Southeast Asia, follows the Austronesian framework of wooden structures on piles, divided in three tiers pertaining to social class: torogan of royalty, mala a walay of lesser nobility, and the common lawig analogous to the bahay kubo.

=== Music and performing arts ===
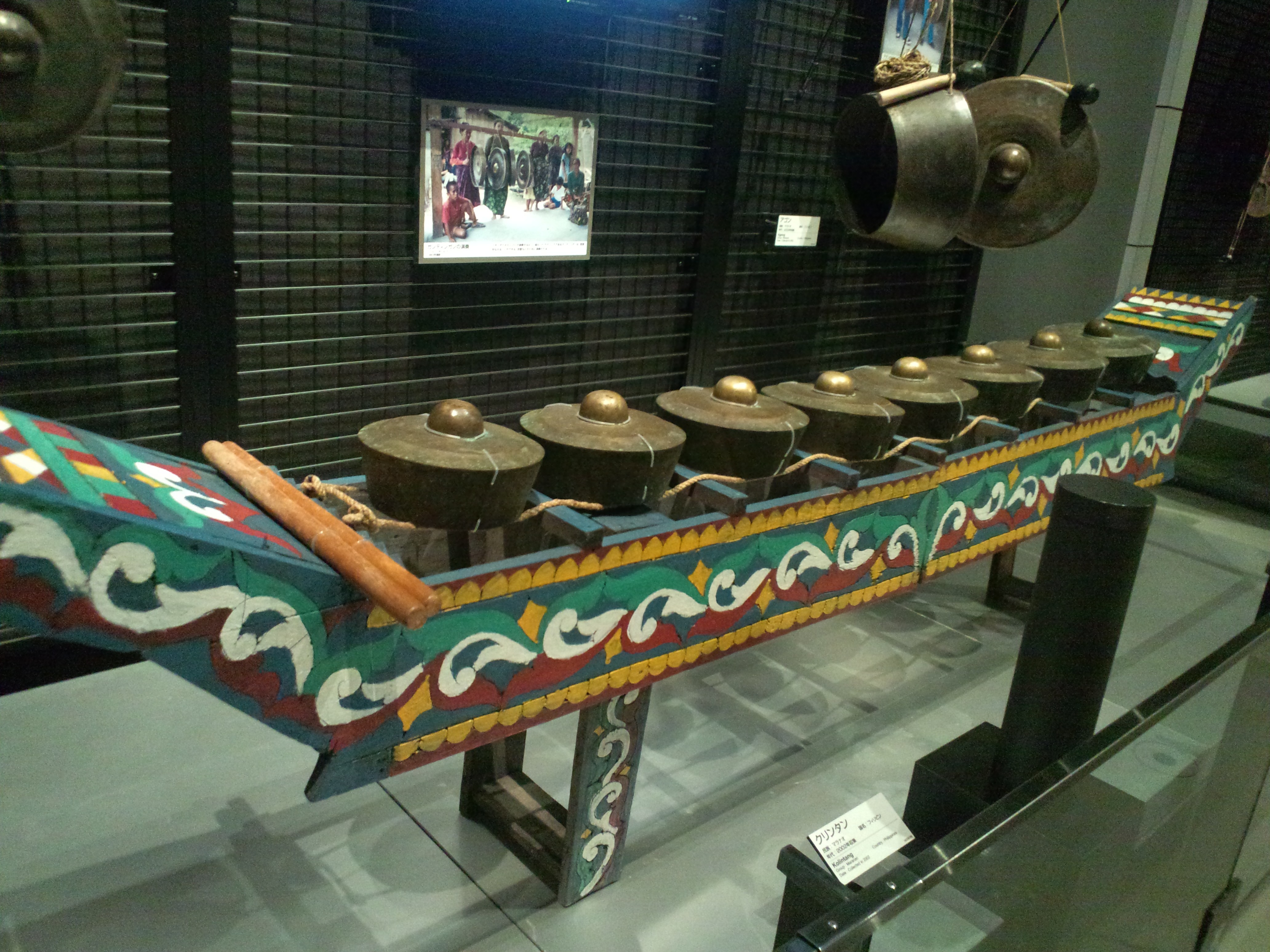
A Kulintang ensemble at the National Museum of Ethnology in Osaka.

Maranao kulintang music is a type of a gong music. Sarunaay is also found among both Muslim and non-Muslim groups of the Southern Philippines. Kobbing is a Maranao instrument and Biyula is another popular Instrument. Biyula is a string instrument. In 2005, the Darangen Epic of the Maranao people of Lake Lanao was selected by UNESCO as a Masterpiece of the Oral and Intangible Heritage of Humanity.

=== Cuisine ===
Maranao cuisine is spicier compared to most regions elsewhere in the Philippines, a trait largely shared with much of Mindanao. Traditionally cultivated spices, locally known as palapa (Bontang, native product of Gandamatu) are a common condiment. It is made of stewed sakurab scallion bulbs, ginger, and chillies in coconut oil.

Dishes are intertwined with important cultural rituals across all aspects of Maranao culture: from birth to death.

=== Social structure ===
Traditionally, Maranao society is divided into two strata. Namely, mapiyatao (pure) and kasilidan (mixed blood). kasilidan is further subdivided into categories which are as follows; sarowang (non-Maranao), balbal (beast), dagamot (Sorcerer/Sorceress) and bisaya (Slave). The mapiyatao are natives entitled to ascend to thrones by pure royal bloodline. On the other hand, the kasilidan are natives suspected of mixed bloodline. However, due to the changes brought by time, these social strata are beginning to decline due to the improving economic conditions of most Maranao families.

=== Economy ===
The Maranao historically engaged in fishing and farming, cultivating crops such as wet rice, corn, and sweet potatoes. Local crafts such as textiles and woodcarvings are popular and sold throughout the country.

== Demographics ==
The Maranao people are shown in chocolate brown in this map.

Maranaos number 1,800,000 in 2020, representing 1.65% of the population. Along with the Iranun and Maguindanao, the Maranao are one of three, related, indigenous groups native to Mindanao. These groups share genes, linguistic and cultural ties to non-Muslim Lumad groups such as the Tiruray or Subanon. Maranao royals have varied infusions of Arab, Indian, Malay, and Chinese ancestry

== Language ==
Maranao is an Austronesian language spoken by the Maranao people in the provinces of Lanao del Norte and Lanao del Sur. Because of the mass influx of Cebuano migrants to Mindanao, many Maranaos are also fluent in Cebuano. Tagalog is also spoken by the Maranaos, which ranks second among its native language, along with English, and Arabic due to its importance to Islam and Maranao culture.

== Notable Maranaos ==
- Abdullah Maute, a jihadist and co-founder of the Maute group and a brother of Omar Maute.
- Omar Maute, a jihadist and co-founder of the Maute group and a brother of Abdullah Maute.
- Saidamen Pangarungan, a lawyer, businessman, and former governor of Lanao del Sur from March 1986 to September 1986 and in 1988 to 1992; and chairman of COMELEC and National Commission on Muslim Filipinos.
- Japar Dimaampao, a present Associate Justice of the Supreme Court of the Philippines
- Mamintal A.J. Tamano, a statesman and a former Senator of the Philippines.
- Adel Tamano, an educator, lawyer and former politician.
- Domocao Alonto, a former politician and senator of the Philippines. In 1988, he was awarded the prestigious King Faisal Prize for Service to Islam.
- Mamintal M. Adiong Sr., a long-time politician, serving as governor of Lanao del Sur from 2001 until his death in 2004.
- Mamintal Alonto Adiong Jr., incumbent governor of Lanao del Sur.
- Abul Khayr Alonto, a businessman and lawyer and a former Moro freedom fighter. He once became the chairman of the Moro National Liberation Front.
- Dimasangcay Pundato, a former Moro revolutionary leader and current undersecretary of the Office of the Presidential Adviser on the Peace Process. He served as the Secretary of the now defunct Office on Muslim affairs (NCMF) for 2 straight administrations.
- Samira Gutoc-Tomawis, a civic leader, journalist, environment and women's rights advocate, and legislator who has served as member of the Regional Legislative Assembly of the Autonomous Region in Muslim Mindanao and a member of the Bangsamoro Transition Commission which was tasked to draft the Bangsamoro Organic Law.
- Mohammad Ali Dimaporo, a former politician and representative representing Lanao provinces in the House of Representatives of the Philippines from 1950s to 1960s, governor of Lanao del Norte from 1960 to 1965, and governor of Lanao del Sur from 1976 to 1986.
- Rommel Romato, a diplomat and former United Nations international civil servant. He served as Chargé d’Affaires ad interim of the Philippine Embassy in Riyadh and as Consul General of the Philippines in Jeddah. He was elected the first Muslim chairperson of the UP Diliman University Student Council.
- Pangalian Balindong, a lawyer and former politician. He was the speaker of the Bangsamoro Parliament from 2019 until his death in 2025. He was also a deputy speaker of the Philippine House of Representatives and a member of the 1971 Philippine Constitutional Convention.
- Tarhata Alonto-Lucman, a former politician and a Maranao noble who was the first female governor of Lanao del Sur.
- Alauya Alonto, a former politician politician best known for being a Delegate to the Constitutional Convention of 1934, and a one-term senator of the Philippines, serving from 1945 to 1947. He was a father of Tarhata Alonto-Lucman.
- Rashid Lucman, a former politician, journalist, and World War II guerilla. He was the early proponent for Moro independence or autonomy.
- Amai Pakpak, a warrior and national hero who lead a resistance against Spanish colonization of Lanao.
- Mohammad Khalid Dimaporo, an economist and politician. He was a 7th and 9th governor of Lanao del Norte.
- Aminah Dimaporo, a politician who is a member of the Philippine House of Representatives. She represents Lanao del Norte's 2nd congressional district since 2022.

== See also ==
- Maranao language
- Iranun people
- Lanao del Sur
- Lake Lanao
- Confederate States of Lanao
- Sultanate of Maguindanao
- Ethnic groups in the Philippines
- Moro peoples
  - Iranun people
  - Maguindanao people
- Lumad
