= 2022 Philippine House of Representatives elections in Bangsamoro =

- May 9, 2022
- All 8 Bangsamoro seats in the House of Representatives
Party	Seats	+/–
Lakas	3	+2
PDP–Laban	2	−1
Nacionalista	1	−1
BUP	1	New
NUP	1	0
This lists parties that won seats. See the complete results below.

The 2022 Philippine House of Representatives elections in Bangsamoro were held on May 9, 2022.

== Summary ==
Congressional district	Incumbent	Incumbent's party	Winner	Winner's party	Winning margin
Basilan	Mujiv Hataman	BUP	Mujiv Hataman	BUP	35.96%
Lanao del Sur–1st	Ansaruddin Alonto Adiong	Nacionalista	Zia Alonto Adiong	Lakas	72.94%
Lanao del Sur–2nd	Yasser Balindong	Lakas	Yasser Balindong	Lakas	13.96%
Maguindanao–1st	Datu Roonie Sinsuat Sr.	UBJP	Dimple Mastura	PDP–Laban	17.73%
Maguindanao–2nd	Esmael Mangudadatu	UBJP	Mohamad Paglas	Nacionalista	16.39%
Sulu–1st	Samier Tan	PDP–Laban	Samier Tan	PDP–Laban	Unopposed
Sulu–2nd	Abdulmunir Arbison	Nacionalista	Munir Arbison Jr.	Lakas	Unopposed
Tawi-Tawi	Rashidin Matba	PDP–Laban	Dimszar Sali	NUP	2.86%

== Basilan ==
Incumbent Mujiv Hataman of the Basilan Unity Party ran for a second term.

Hataman won re-election against three other candidates.

Candidate	Party	Votes	%
Mujiv Hataman	Basilan Unity Party	137,976	67.57
Yasmeen Junaid	United Bangsamoro Justice Party	64,555	31.61
Abdulhan Jaujohn	Independent	874	0.43
Mohammad Alih Samiun	Pederalismo ng Dugong Dakilang Samahan	790	0.39
Total		204,195	100.00
Total votes		223,811	–
Registered voters/turnout		297,322	75.28
BUP hold			
Source: Commission on Elections

== Lanao del Sur ==
=== 1st district ===
Incumbent Ansaruddin Alonto Adiong of the Nacionalista Party retired.

Adiong endorsed his brother, Bangsamoro member of parliament Zia Alonto Adiong (Lakas–CMD), who won against four other candidates.

Candidate	Party	Votes	%
Zia Alonto Adiong	Lakas–CMD	223,631	83.83
Fatani Abdul Malik	Ummah Party	29,043	10.89
Ansaroden Lucman Moner	Independent	5,833	2.19
Sultan Bert Mustapha	Reform Party	5,387	2.02
Mohammad Razuman	Independent	2,870	1.08
Total		266,764	100.00
Total votes		312,809	–
Registered voters/turnout		390,056	80.20
Lakas gain from Nacionalista			
Source: Commission on Elections

=== 2nd district ===
Incumbent Yasser Balindong of Lakas–CMD ran for a second term.

Balindong won re-election against former Autonomous Region in Muslim Mindanao assemblyman Froxy Macarambon (Aksyon Demokratiko) and two other candidates.

Candidate	Party	Votes	%
Yasser Balindong (incumbent)	Lakas–CMD	111,704	56.19
Froxy Macarambon	Aksyon Demokratiko	83,954	42.23
Sagusara Andong	Independent	2,494	1.25
Abolkhair Maca-ayan	Reform Party	660	0.33
Total		198,812	100.00
Total votes		232,634	–
Registered voters/turnout		295,587	78.70
Lakas hold			
Source: Commission on Elections

== Maguindanao ==
=== 1st district ===
Incumbent Datu Roonie Sinsuat Sr. of the United Bangsamoro Justice Party ran for a second term.

Sinsuat was defeated by Bangsamoro member of parliament Dimple Mastura of PDP–Laban. Five other candidates also ran for representative.

Candidate	Party	Votes	%
Dimple Mastura	PDP–Laban	157,732	54.55
Datu Roonie Sinsuat Sr. (incumbent)	United Bangsamoro Justice Party	106,470	36.82
Bai Donna Dilangalen	Kilusang Bagong Lipunan	10,811	3.74
Mohammad Ali Amil	Independent	7,835	2.71
Jashiraya Dilangalen	Philippine Democratic Socialist Party	4,564	1.58
Mastura Mokamad	PROMDI	1,100	0.38
Ellas Dimarao	Independent	628	0.22
Total		289,140	100.00
Total votes		322,778	–
Registered voters/turnout		484,349	66.64
PDP–Laban gain from UBJP			
Source: Commission on Elections

=== 2nd district ===
Incumbent Esmael Mangudadatu of the United Bangsamoro Justice Party (UBJP) ran for governor of Maguindanao.

The UBJP nominated Mangudadatu's brother, former representative Dong Mangudadatu, who was defeated by Datu Paglas vice mayor Tong Paglas of the Nacionalista Party. Two other candidates also ran for representative.

Candidate	Party	Votes	%
Tong Paglas	Nacionalista Party	169,017	57.80
Dong Mangudadatu	United Bangsamoro Justice Party	121,085	41.41
Bing Mangacop	PROMDI	1,411	0.48
Kadil Kayadtugan	Independent	925	0.32
Total		292,438	100.00
Total votes		347,429	–
Registered voters/turnout		454,662	76.41
Nacionalista gain from UBJP			
Source: Commission on Elections

== Sulu ==
=== 1st district ===
Incumbent Samier Tan of PDP–Laban won re-election for a second term unopposed.

Candidate	Party	Votes	%
Samier Tan (incumbent)	PDP–Laban	186,240	100.00
Total		186,240	100.00
Total votes		206,681	–
Registered voters/turnout		246,813	83.74
PDP–Laban hold			
Source: Commission on Elections

=== 2nd district ===
Incumbent Abdulmunir Arbison of the Nacionalista Party was term-limited.

Arbison endorsed his son, Munir Arbison Jr. (Lakas–CMD), who won the election unopposed.

Candidate	Party	Votes	%
Munir Arbison Jr.	Lakas–CMD	148,262	100.00
Total		148,262	100.00
Total votes		168,584	–
Registered voters/turnout		186,559	90.36
Lakas gain from Nacionalista			
Source: Commission on Elections

== Tawi-Tawi ==
Incumbent Rashidin Matba of PDP–Laban retired.

PDP–Laban nominated former representative Ruby Sahali and Gen Epah Reyes, who were defeated by Tawi-Tawi governor Yshmael Sali's nephew, Dimszar Sali of the National Unity Party.

Candidate	Party	Votes	%
Dimszar Sali	National Unity Party	91,828	51.26
Ruby Sahali	PDP–Laban	86,704	48.40
Gen Epah Reyes	PDP–Laban	599	0.33
Total		179,131	100.00
Total votes		192,146	–
Registered voters/turnout		232,845	82.52
NUP gain from PDP–Laban			
Source: Commission on Elections
