= Zia Alonto Adiong =

Filipino politician (born 1977)

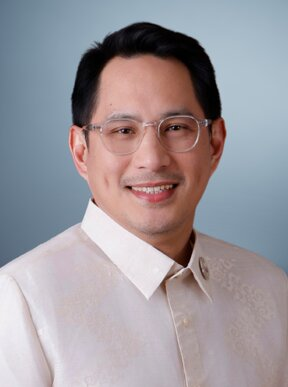
- Official portrait, 2025

Member of the House of Representatives of the Philippines from Lanao del Sur's 1st District
- Incumbent
- Assumed office June 30, 2022
- Preceded by: Ansaruddin Alonto Adiong

Member of the Bangsamoro Parliament
- In office June 30, 2019 – June 30, 2022

Personal details
- Born: Ziaur-Rahman Alonto Adiong; October 16, 1979 (age 47) Marawi, Lanao del Sur, Philippines
- Party: Lakas (2021–present); SIAP (local party; 2021–present)
- Spouse: Indira R. Ali Pacasum (m. 2018) Hafsah D. Balindong (m. 2007)
- Children: 5
- Parent(s): Mamintal Adiong Sr. (father); Soraya Alonto Adiong (mother)
- Relatives: Mamintal Adiong Jr. (brother); Ansaruddin Alonto Adiong (brother); Yasser Balindong (cousin); Domocao Alonto (grandfather); Alauya Alonto (great-grandfather); Akira I. Alonto (brother-in-law); Amer Zaakaria Adiong Rakim (nephew); Mamintal Rakiin Adiong III (nephew)
- Education: Xavier University – Ateneo de Cagayan (BS)
- Occupation: Politician
- Known for: Political leadership in Lanao del Sur

Ziaur-Rahman "Zia" Alonto Adiong (born October 16, 1979) is a Filipino politician serving as a member of the House of Representatives of the Philippines, representing the 1st district of Lanao del Sur since 2022. Prior to this, he served as a member of the Bangsamoro Parliament from 2019 to 2022, where he was instrumental in promoting regional autonomy within the Bangsamoro Autonomous Region in Muslim Mindanao (BARMM).

== Early life and education ==
Zia Alonto Adiong is the son of Mamintal Adiong Sr. and Soraya Bedjora Adiong. He earned a Bachelor of Science degree in Psychology from Xavier University – Ateneo de Cagayan.

== Political career ==
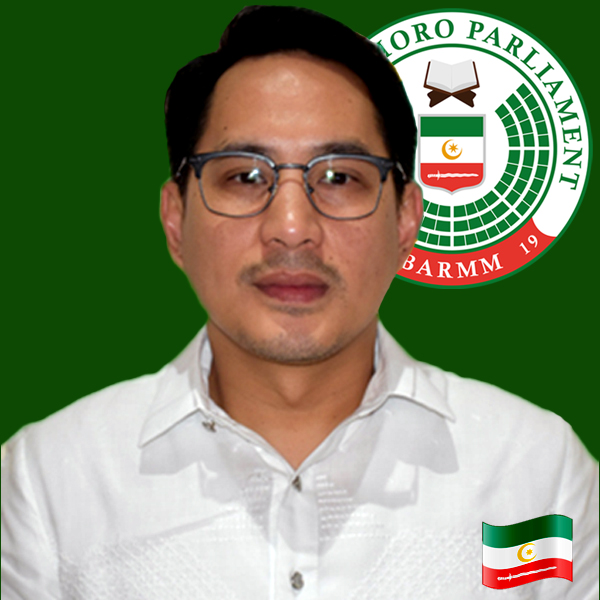
Portrait of Adiong during his term as member of Bangsamoro Parliament

Adiong has been a member of the Bangsamoro Parliament.

Adiong opposed the creation of new municipalities in Lanao Sur.

In October 2023, Adiong condemned Ambassador Teodoro Locsin Jr.'s remarks suggesting the killing of Palestinian children, calling it "dangerous, bigoted, and Islamophobic rhetoric." Adiong, vice chairperson of the House Special Committee on Peace, Reconciliation, and Unity, stressed that such statements have no place in society, particularly from high-ranking officials tasked with promoting peace and humanity.

In August 2024, Adiong called for an end to religious affiliation politicization in response to statements by Sara Duterte. Adiong also condemned Sara Duterte's controversial statements about "hitmen" and emphasizing the need for leaders who uphold justice and peaceful governance. He has also been involved in Bangsamoro-related issues, particularly regarding the Supreme Court's decision to exclude Sulu from the region.

== Personal life ==
Adiong is the brother of Mamintal Adiong Jr. and Ansaruddin Alonto Adiong. He married Indira R. Ali Pacasum on February 6, 2018. On March 1, 2019, the couple welcomed their son, Ahmad Domocao III, on the same day the transition from the Autonomous Region in Muslim Mindanao (ARMM) to the Bangsamoro Autonomous Region in Muslim Mindanao (BARMM) began.

Adiong started his college education at the University of the Philippines Diliman with a degree in music, eventually shifting to music research after having difficulty with music theory. He eventually transferred to Xavier University – Ateneo de Cagayan where he completed a BS degree in psychology.

During the second impeachment trial of Sara Duterte, Adiong serves as a spokesperson for the House prosecution panel, along with Kabataan partylist representative Renee Co.

== Electoral history ==
Electoral history of Zia Alonto Adiong
Year	Office	Party		Votes received				Result
Year	Office	Local	National	Total	%	P.	Swing	Result
2022	Representative (Lanao del Sur–1st)	SIAP	Lakas	223,631	83.83%	1st	—N/a	Won
2025	Representative (Lanao del Sur–1st)	SIAP	Lakas	210,376	70.76%	1st	-13.07	Won

== Awards and recognition ==
- The Outstanding Young Men (TOYM) Awardee for 2019.
