= Domocao Alonto =

Filipino Muslim senator (1914-2002)

The Honorable Domocao Alonto
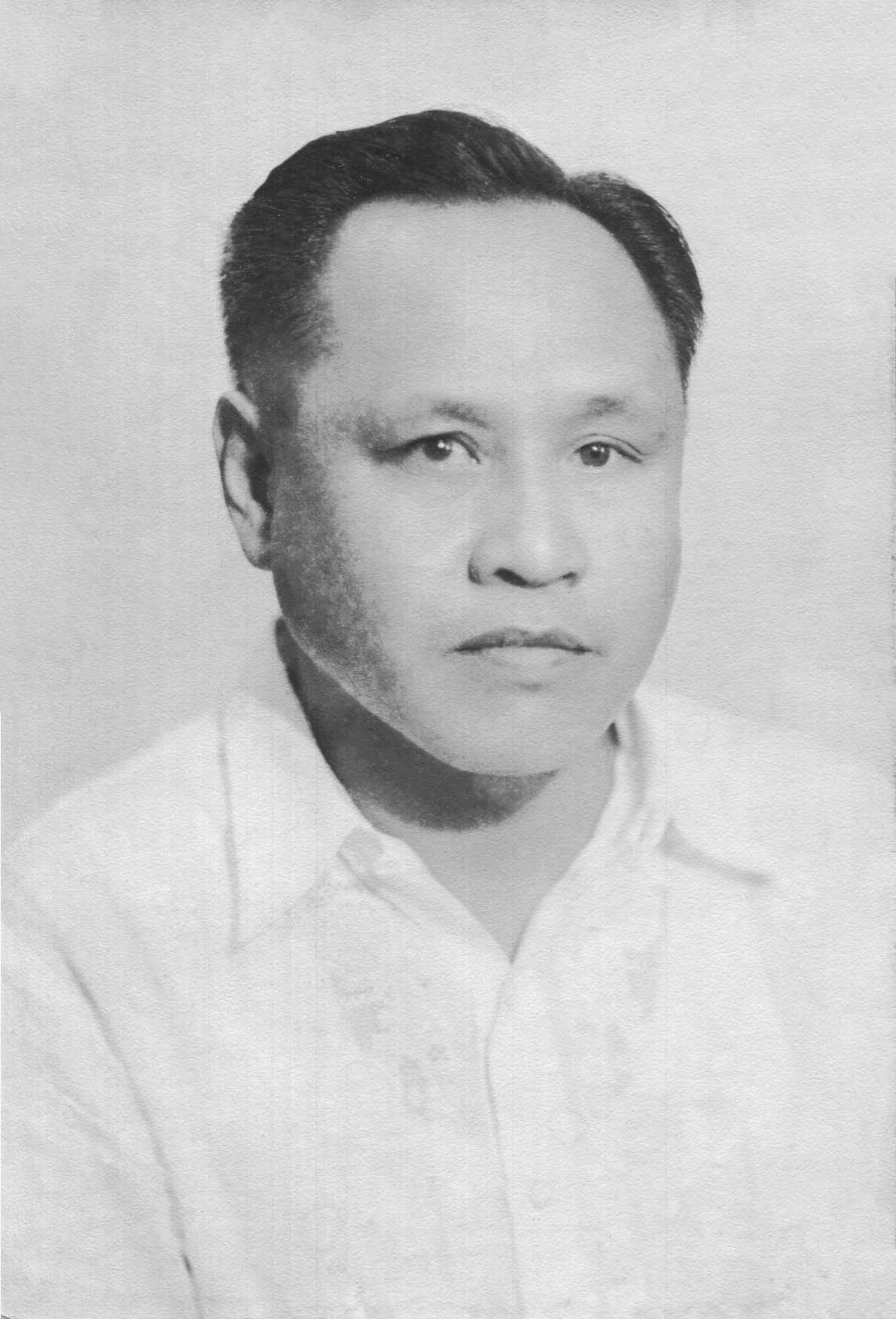

Senator of the Philippines
- In office December 30, 1955 – December 30, 1961

Member of the House of Representatives from Lanao's Lone District
- In office January 25, 1954 – November 8, 1955
- Preceded by: Mohammad Ali Dimaporo
- Succeeded by: Mohammad Ali Dimaporo

Presidential Assistant and Adviser to the Office of the President of the Philippines
- In office 1947–1948

Personal details
- Born: Ahmad Domocao Alangadi Alonto; August 1, 1914 Ditsaan-Ramain, Lanao, Philippine Islands
- Died: December 11, 2002 (aged 88) Marawi, Lanao del Sur, Philippines
- Party: Nacionalista
- Education: University of the Philippines

Ahmad Domocao "Domie" Alangadi Alonto Sr. (August 1, 1914 – December 11, 2002) was a Filipino Muslim lawyer, educator, author, traditional leader, and Islamic figure from Lanao del Sur.

He served as a Senator of the Philippines and was elected as a delegate in the 1971 Constitutional Convention and 1986 Philippine Constitutional Commission.

In 1988, he was awarded with the prestigious King Faisal Prize for Service to Islam.

== Early life and education ==
Dr. Domocao Alonto was born on August 1, 1914, in Ditsaan-Ramain, Lanao del Sur. He was the eldest son of the six children of Senator Sultan Alauya Alonto of Ramain and Bai Hajja Amina Bariga Alangadi, a sixth-generation descendant of Sultan Muhammad Kudarat of Maguindanao.

At an early age, he was tutored by his mother on the fundamentals of Islam. He then attended a government school in Lanao from 1921 to 1931 for his primary and secondary education. He earned his Fellowship in Arts, BA, and Doctorate in Law at the University of the Philippines in Manila, where he was also a member of the Upsilon Sigma Phi fraternity. He passed the Bar Examination in 1938.

His siblings - Hadja Naima Alonto; Abdul Ghafur Madki Alonto; Masiding Alonto, Sr.; Tarhata Alonto-Lucman, and Madrigal Alonto - were all prominent leaders in Lanao during the latter half of the 20th century. Abdul Ghafur Madki Alonto served as Governor and Ambassador, and Tarhata Alonto served as Governor. His brother-in-law, Bae Tarhata's husband Rashid Lucman also served as Congressman.

== Political career ==
Alonto started working as a classroom teacher in Lanao del Sur. He then became a confidential writer for the National Information Board and the Department of the Interior. At the onset of World War II, he was commissioned as a First Lieutenant in the Philippine Army, 81st Division, United States Army Forces in the Far East (USAFFE).

=== Japanese occupation ===
During the Japanese occupation of the Philippines (1942–1945), Alonto served as the municipal mayor of Dansalan (now Marawi). He then became the governor of Lanao Province during the caretaker government under Japanese rule.

While serving under the Japanese government, Alonto secretly supported the underground resistance movement against the Japanese. The Japanese authorities did not harbor any suspicion toward him since he occupied key positions in their government. It was during this time that he was able to have a broader grasp of the state of Maranao society in general.

After the war, he was appointed as Presidential Assistant and Adviser to the Office of the President of the Republic of the Philippines from 1947 to 1948.

=== Congress ===
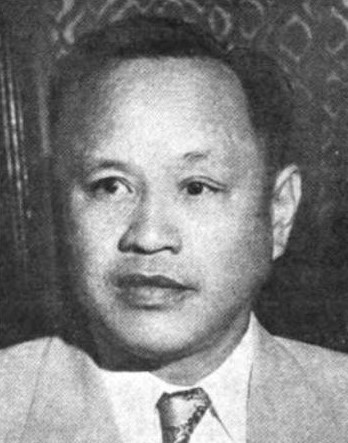
Alonto official portrait during the 3rd Congress.

Alonto was first elected representative of Lanao del Sur in 1953. During his term, he chaired a Special Committee created by the House of Representatives to find a definite solution to the so-called "Mindanao Problem". In 1954, he founded the Mindanao Islamic University (Jāmīatu al-Fīlībbīn al-Islāmi), the first Islamic university in the Philippine archipelago.

From 1955 to 1961, he served as a member of the Senate under the Nacionalista Party. During his term, he authored the bills establishing the Mindanao Development Authority, the Mindanao State University (MSU), the law providing for more autonomous local governments in relatively backward rural areas, and the law creating the Commission on National Integration. Alonto also amended the Civil Service Law of 1959, recognizing the Islamic holidays ‘Īid al-Fitr and ‘Īid al-Adhā.

Alonto also authored the law (enacted as Republic Act No. 2228) dividing the old Lanao Province into Lanao del Norte and Lanao del Sur. Each province was provided with congressional representatives.

As a legislator, he advocated for the understanding between Muslim Filipinos and their Christian brothers and preached for non-violence and peaceful coexistence. He was also a strong advocate for the passage of nationalization laws and co-authored the Retail Nationalization Law, subsequently defending it from repeal until incontrovertible proof was shown that the law was adverse to the national interest.

=== Kamlon rebellion ===
After World War II, Hadji Kamlon launched a bloody upheaval against government forces which lasted for eight years ending in 1952. Growing tensions between Muslims and Christian over land attracted the national interest of which a Special Committee in 1954 was constituted by Congress. The Committee, also known as the "Alonto Committee", was composed of Lanao Congressman, Domocao Alonto as chairman, Cotabato Congressman Luminog Mangelen, and Sulu Congressman Ombra Amilbangsa. The Committee concluded that "the Moros must be made to feel that they were an integral part of the Philippine nation and this aim must be achieved through a comprehensive approach covering economic, social, moral political, and educational developments".

The conclusion reached by the Special Committee paved the way for the creation of the Commission on National Integration (CNI); Mindanao Development Authority (MDA); and Mindanao State University (MSU).

=== Bandung Conference ===
In 1955, a meeting of non-aligned nations who refused to partake in the Cold War was held in Bandung, Indonesia. Along with Foreign Secretary Carlos P. Romulo, Domocao Alonto was the only Muslim delegate from the Philippines. It was in this meeting that he met Gamal Abdel Nasser of Egypt, Sukarno of Indonesia, and Tunku Abdul Rahman of Malaysia.

His participation in the conference enabled him to establish linkages and contacts in the Middle East. The Muslim world was made aware of the presence of Muslims in the islands of Mindanao and Sulu. As a result, he got scholarships for Filipino Muslims coming from Mindanao and Sulu at the Cairo Military Academy, Al Azhar University in Egypt. Among these students was the young Salamat Hashim who would, later on, establish the Moro Islamic Liberation Front (MILF).

=== Jabidah massacre ===
March 17, 1968, sixty-four Moro military trainees were massacred by their military handlers on the island of Corregidor. As a result, there was an outpouring of protest among the Muslim communities around the Philippines demanding for justice. In Lanao del Sur, Domocao Alonto established the Ansar El Islam (Helpers of Islam) along with Sayyid Sharif Capt. Kalingalan Caluang, Rashid Lucman, Salipada Pendatun, Hamid Kamlian, Udtog Matalam, and Atty. Macapantun Abbas Jr. Accordingly, "it is a mass movement for the preservation and development of Islam in the Philippines". The advocacy of Ansar El Islam would, later on, inspire the creation of the Moro National Liberation Front (MNLF) and the MILF.

=== Martial law ===
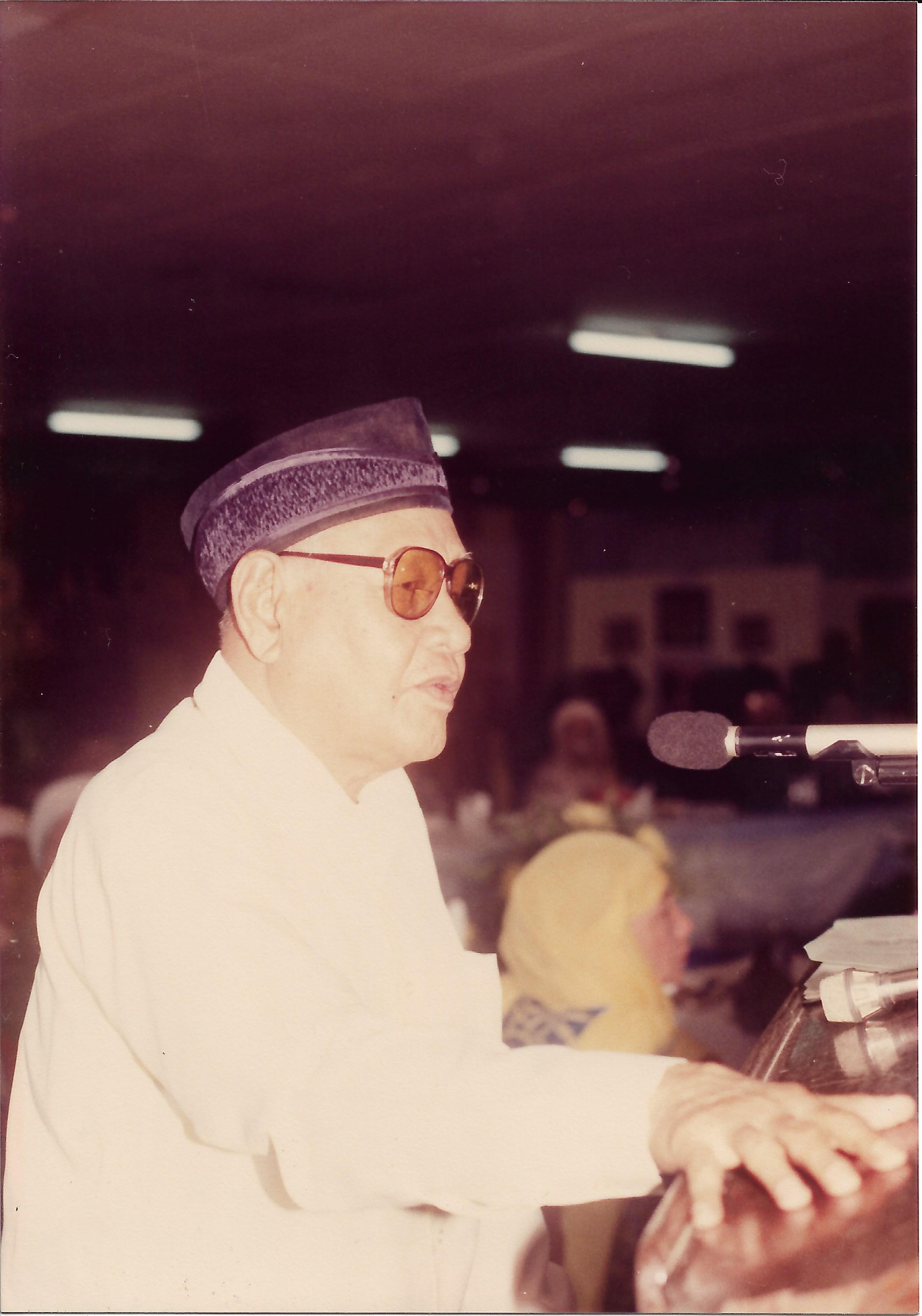
Alonto delivers his speech during the King Faisal Prize Award ceremony in MSU.

Domocao Alonto joined the opposition movement when dictator Ferdinand Marcos declared Martial Law in the Philippines. In 1983, a series of meetings was held at the house of his nephew Abul Khayr Alonto to discuss the plight of the Muslims during the dictatorship. Together with Salipada Pendatun, Mamintal Tamano, Abul Khayr Alonto, Abraham Rasul, Prof. Joel delos Santos, Prof. Ibrahim Mama-o, Al Marin Tillah, Robert Alonto, Saidamen Pangarungan, and Bai Norhata Alonto, the meetings resulted to the signing of the "Manifesto of the Moslems of the Philippines Supporting the Call for National Reconciliation and Unity". The group threatened to reassert the old claim for a separate "Moro Nation" in Mindanao "unless national reconciliation with justice for all is speedily effected". They also referred to the assassinated opposition leader Ninoy Aquino as a martyr who supported the Muslim Filipinos' demand for greater autonomy.

Alonto was also instrumental in bringing the issue about the plight of Muslim-Filipinos to the world stage. His extensive network with other Muslim countries would eventually lay foundations for the involvement of the Organization of Islamic Conference (OIC) in the Mindanao peace process.

=== Constitutional conventions ===
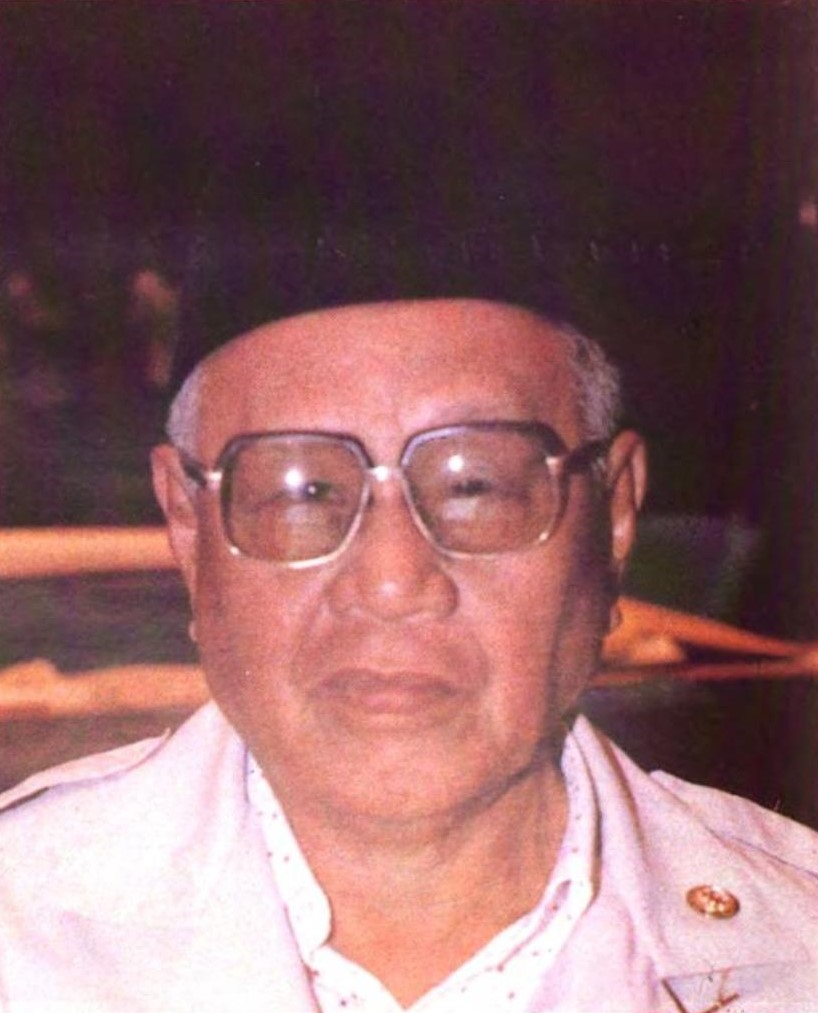
Alonto from the Official Directory of the Constitutional Commission, c. 1986

Alonto represented Lanao del Sur during the 1971 Constitutional Convention.

Alonto then served as Assistant Floor Leader for the 1986 Constitutional Commission. He proposed the addition of the Autonomous Region in Muslim Mindanao (ARMM) in the 1987 Constitution of the Philippines.

In both conventions, he advocated for the accommodation of the Muslim Filipinos in the larger nation-building program of the national government. While he believed in the argument of the Moro secessionist movements that there are legitimate injustices committed against the Muslims, he favored the exhaustion of all the available legitimate means to resolve the conflict. He championed meaningful autonomy for Muslim Mindanao and Sulu as a remedy to resolving the Mindanao problem.

== Death and legacy ==
Left to right: Former Senator Domocao Alonto, Sheikh Ahmad, and former ARMM Governor Lininding Pangandaman representing Muslims in the Philippines to one of the Muslim World League conferences in 1982, Makkah, Saudi Arabia.

Alonto died on December 11, 2002, in his home in Marawi after a brief bout with cancer.

Alonto is known for his contributions to the spread and development of Islamic thought in the Philippines. He founded the Mindanao Islamic University which provides education for both Muslims and Christians. He also founded the Mindanao Mosque and Islamic Center in Marawi City, the largest of its kind in the Philippines, and the Rajah Solaiman Mosque (Masjid Solaymaniah) located in Binangonan, Rizal.

He was a founding member of the Makkah-based World Muslim League, the Executive Council of the World Islamic Congress and the Central Council of the International Organization of Islamic Universities, and other Islamic organization based in the Philippines. He is the only Filipino to receive the King Faisal Foundation Award for Service to Islam.

In 2005, Alonto was included in "100 great Muslim Leaders of the 20th Century", published by the Institute of Objective Studies in New Delhi, India.

== Descendants ==
His son, Adnan Villaluna Alonto, became Ambassador to Saudi Arabia under the administration of President Rodrigo Duterte. His daughter, Soraya Bedjora Adiong, was elected as Governor of Lanao del Sur in 2016. His son, Ahmad Engracia Alonto Jr., served as the President of Mindanao State University from 1987 to 1992. His grandson, Ansaruddin, Zia Alonto Adiong and Yasser Balindong are served as members of the House of Representatives, representing the 1st and 2nd district of Lanao del Sur, respectively. The incumbent Governor of Lanao del Sur, Mamintal Adiong Jr.
