= 2025 Philippine House of Representatives elections in Bangsamoro =

Philippine regional elections

- May 12, 2025
- All 6 Bangsamoro seats in the House of Representatives
Party	Seats	+/–
Lakas	3	0
PFP	2	New
NUP	1	0
This lists parties that won seats. See the complete results below.

The 2025 Philippine House of Representatives elections in the Bangsamoro were held on May 12, 2025, as part of the 2025 Philippine general election.

== Summary ==
Congressional district	Incumbent	Incumbent's party	Winner	Winner's party	Winning margin
Basilan	Mujiv Hataman	BUP	Yusop Alano	PFP	13.02%
Lanao del Sur–1st	Zia Alonto Adiong	Lakas	Zia Alonto Adiong	Lakas	45.00%
Lanao del Sur–2nd	Yasser Balindong	Lakas	Yasser Balindong	Lakas	60.40%
Maguindanao del Norte	Dimple Mastura	Lakas	Dimple Mastura	Lakas	32.60%
Maguindanao del Sur	Tong Paglas	Lakas	Esmael Mangudadatu	PFP	0.24%
Tawi-Tawi	Dimszar Sali	NUP	Dimszar Sali	NUP	50.76%

== Basilan ==
2025 Basilan's at-large congressional district election
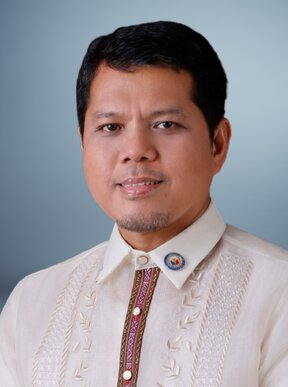

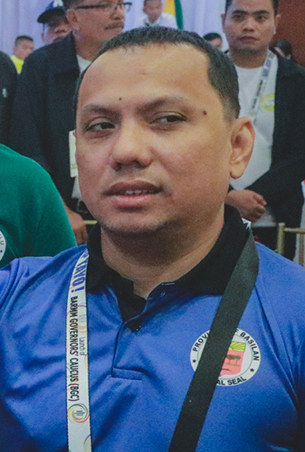
Candidate	Yusop Alano	Hanie Bud
Party	PFP	Liberal
popular vote	131,501	101,206
Percentage	56.51%	43.49%
House representative before election
Mujiv Hataman
BUP
Elected House representative
Yusop Alano
PFP

Incumbent Mujiv Hataman of the Basilan Unity Party retired to run for governor of Basilan.

Hataman endorsed Maluso mayor Hanie Bud of the Liberal Party, who was defeated by Basilan vice governor Yusop Alano of the Partido Federal ng Pilipinas.

Candidate	Party	Votes	%
Yusop Alano	Partido Federal ng Pilipinas	131,501	56.51
Hanie Bud	Liberal Party	101,206	43.49
Total		232,707	100.00
Valid votes		232,707	92.67
Invalid/blank votes		18,401	7.33
Total votes		251,108	100.00
Registered voters/turnout		315,601	79.57
PFP gain from BUP			
Source: Commission on Elections

== Lanao del Sur ==
=== 1st district ===
2025 Lanao del Sur's 1st congressional district election
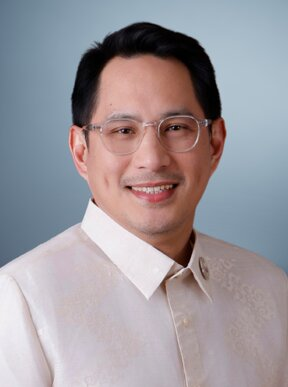
		UBJP
Candidate	Zia Alonto Adiong	Abofarhan Hadjiomar
Party	Lakas	UBJP
popular vote	210,376	76,569
Percentage	70.76%	25.76%
House representative before election
Zia Alonto Adiong
Lakas
Elected House representative
Zia Alonto Adiong
Lakas

Incumbent Zia Alonto Adiong of Lakas–CMD ran for a second term.

Adiong won re-election against three other candidates.

Candidate	Party	Votes	%
Zia Alonto Adiong (incumbent)	Lakas–CMD	210,376	70.76
Abofarhan Hadjiomar	United Bangsamoro Justice Party	76,569	25.76
Macloc Dagalangit	Workers' and Peasants' Party	9,263	3.12
Gebson Macabato	Independent	1,087	0.37
Total		297,295	100.00
Valid votes		297,295	90.54
Invalid/blank votes		31,047	9.46
Total votes		328,342	100.00
Registered voters/turnout		403,831	81.31
Lakas hold			
Source: Commission on Elections

=== 2nd district ===
2025 Lanao del Sur's 2nd congressional district election
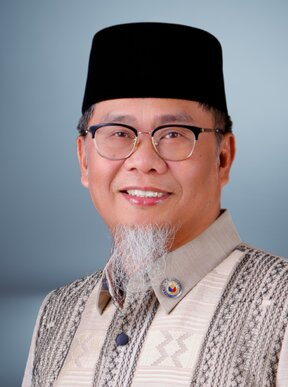
		UBJP
Candidate	Yasser Balindong	Rehan Lao
Party	Lakas	UBJP
popular vote	174,310	43,025
Percentage	80.20%	19.80%
House representative before election
Yasser Balindong
Lakas
Elected House representative
Yasser Balindong
Lakas

Incumbent Yasser Balindong of Lakas–CMD ran for a third term.

Balindong won re-election against Rehan Lao (United Bangsamoro Justice Party).

Candidate	Party	Votes	%
Yasser Balindong (incumbent)	Lakas–CMD	174,310	80.20
Rehan Lao	United Bangsamoro Justice Party	43,025	19.80
Total		217,335	100.00
Valid votes		217,335	89.03
Invalid/blank votes		26,775	10.97
Total votes		244,110	100.00
Registered voters/turnout		303,088	80.54
Lakas hold			
Source: Commission on Elections

== Maguindanao del Norte ==
2025 Maguindanao del Norte's at-large congressional district election
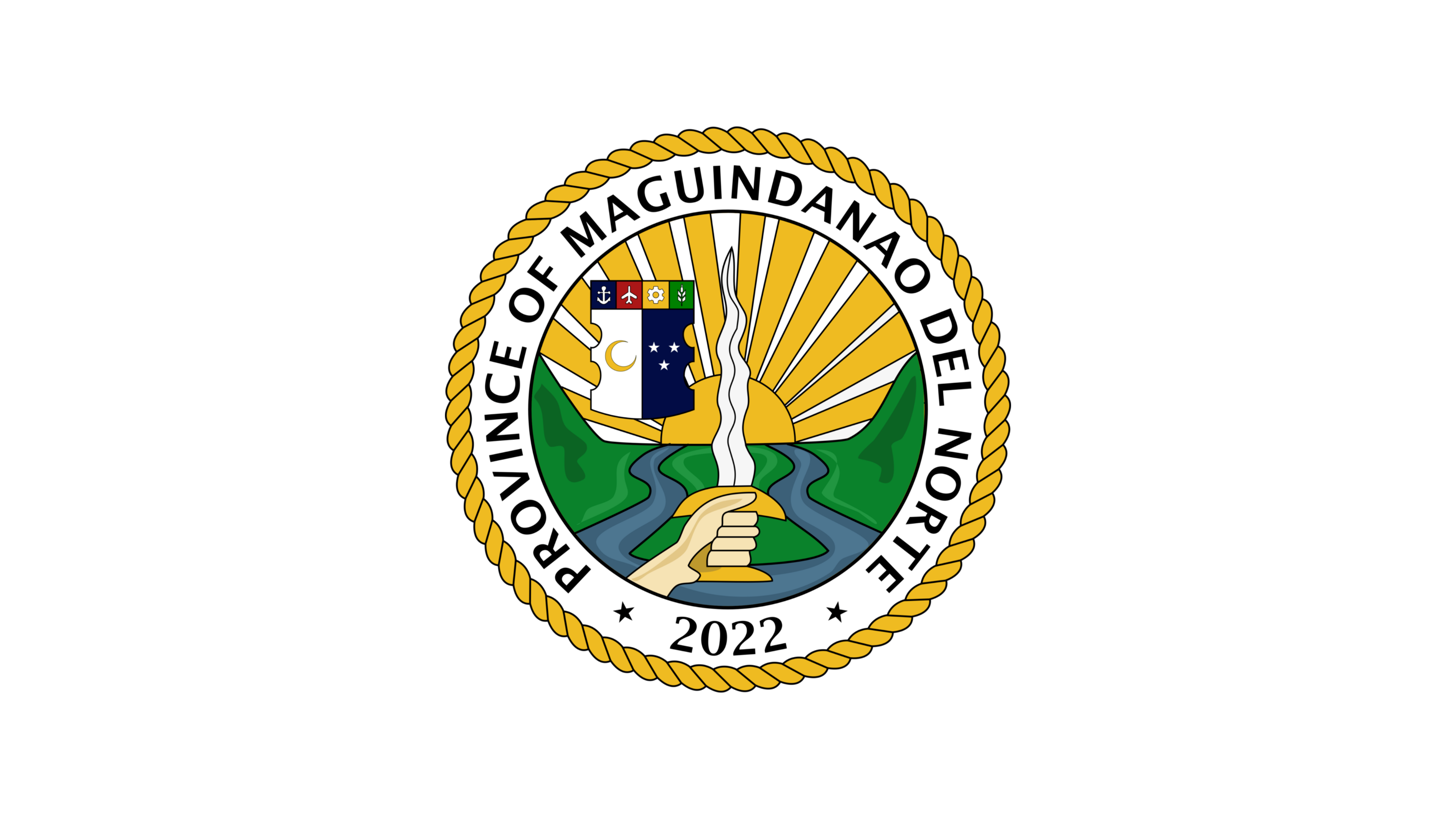

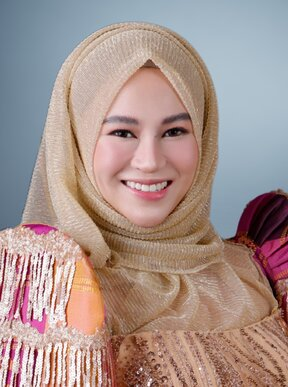

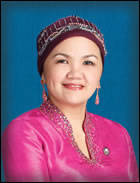
Candidate	Dimple Mastura	Bai Sandra Sema
Party	Lakas	UBJP
popular vote	231,745	117,263
Percentage	65.98%	33.38%
House representative before election
Dimple Mastura
Lakas
Elected House representative
Dimple Mastura
Lakas

The district was created after the creation of the province of Maguindanao del Norte was approved in a plebiscite held in 2022. The district was previously Maguindanao's 1st district.

Incumbent Dimple Mastura of Lakas–CMD ran for a second term. She was previously affiliated with PDP–Laban.

Mastura won re-election against former representative Bai Sandra Sema (United Bangsamoro Justice Party) and Sittie Mariefa Gascon (Independent).

Candidate	Party	Votes	%
Dimple Mastura (incumbent)	Lakas–CMD	231,745	65.98
Bai Sandra Sema	United Bangsamoro Justice Party	117,263	33.38
Sittie Mariefa Gascon	Independent	2,248	0.64
Total		351,256	100.00
Valid votes		351,256	93.18
Invalid/blank votes		25,702	6.82
Total votes		376,958	100.00
Registered voters/turnout		530,526	71.05
Lakas hold			
Source: Commission on Elections

== Maguindanao del Sur ==
2025 Maguindanao del Sur's at-large congressional district election
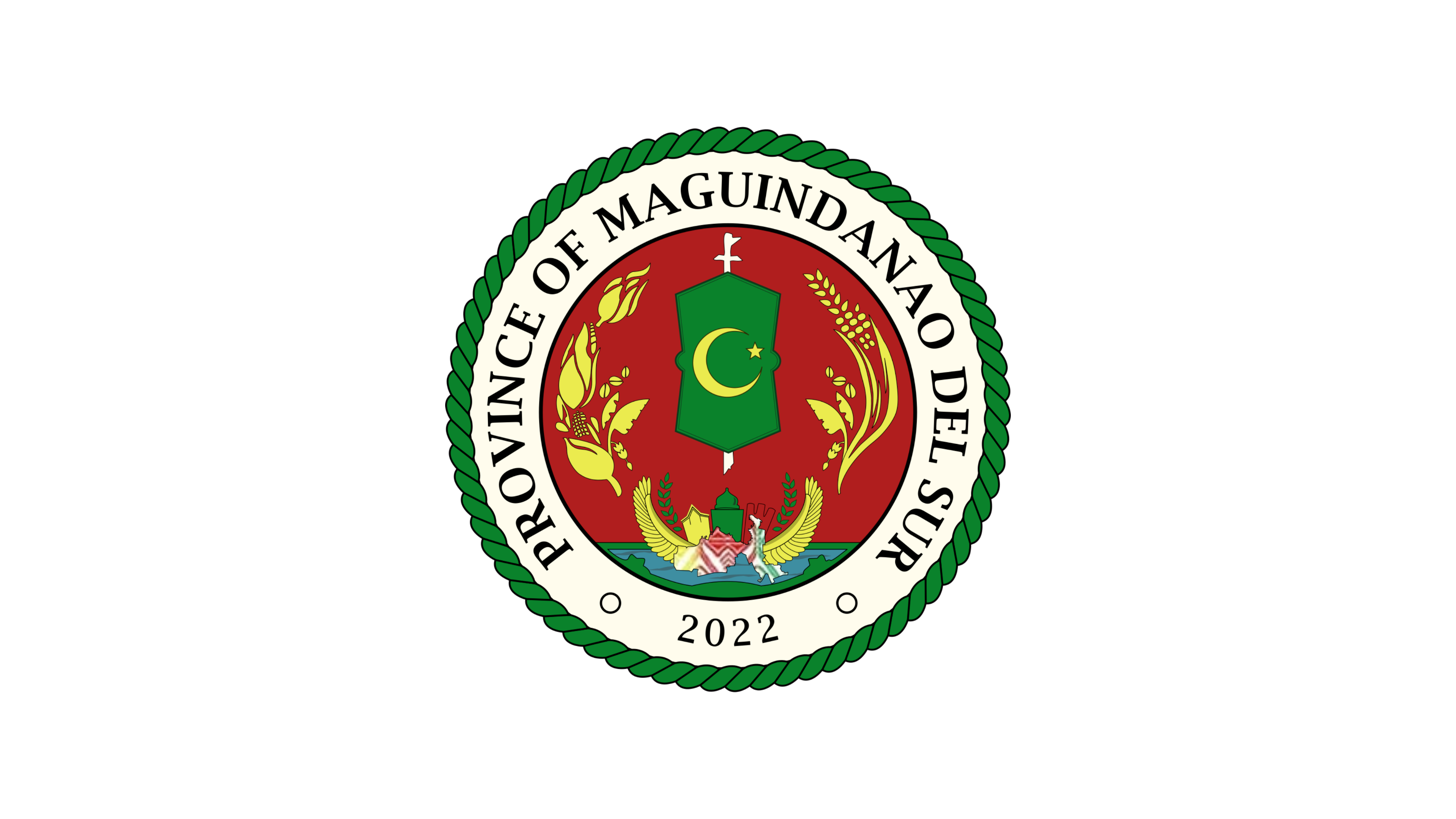

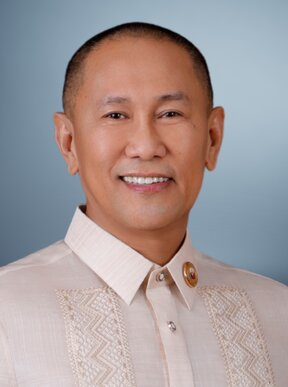

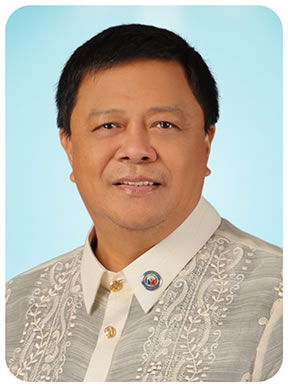
Candidate	Esmael Mangudadatu	Tong Paglas
Party	PFP	Lakas
Popular vote	166,090	165,280
Percentage	50.12%	49.88%
House representative before election
Tong Paglas
Lakas
Elected House representative
Esmael Mangudadatu
PFP

The district was created after the creation of the province of Maguindanao del Sur was approved in a plebiscite held in 2022. The district was previously Maguindanao's 2nd district.

Incumbent Tong Paglas of Lakas–CMD ran for a second term.

Paglas was defeated by former representative Esmael Mangudadatu of the Partido Federal ng Pilipinas.

Candidate	Party	Votes	%
Esmael Mangudadatu	Partido Federal ng Pilipinas	166,090	50.12
Tong Paglas (incumbent)	Lakas–CMD	165,280	49.88
Total		331,370	100.00
Valid votes		331,370	93.59
Invalid/blank votes		22,698	6.41
Total votes		354,068	100.00
Registered voters/turnout		451,687	78.39
PFP gain from Lakas			
Source: Commission on Elections

== Tawi-Tawi ==
2025 Tawi-Tawi's at-large congressional district election
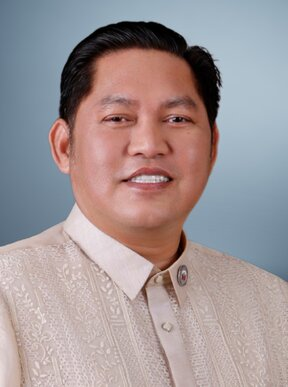
		AKYSON
Candidate	Dimszar Sali	Anuar Abubakar
Party	NUP	Aksyon
popular vote		45,814
Percentage		24.62%
House representative before election
Dimszar Sali
NUP
Elected House representative
Dimszar Sali
NUP

Incumbent Dimszar Sali of the National Unity Party ran for a second term.

Sali won re-election against former representative Anuar Abubakar (Aksyon Demokratiko).

Candidate	Party	Votes	%
Dimszar Sali (incumbent)	National Unity Party	140,294	75.38
Anuar Abubakar	Aksyon Demokratiko	45,814	24.62
Total		186,108	100.00
Valid votes		186,108	91.99
Invalid/blank votes		16,212	8.01
Total votes		202,320	100.00
Registered voters/turnout		255,632	79.15
NUP hold			
Source: Commission on Elections
