= Tarhata Alonto-Lucman =

Filipino politician and Maranao royalty (1926–2021)

- Born: Tarhata Alonto; June 26, 1926
- Died: February 26, 2021 (aged 94); Marawi, Philippines
- Spouse: Rashid Lucman (m. 1951)
Names
- Tarhata Alonto-Lucman
- House: Ramain
- Father: Alauya Alonto

Governor of Lanao del Sur
- In office September 1986 – 1988
- Preceded by: Saidamen Pangarungan
- Succeeded by: Saidamen Pangarungan
- In office 1971–1975
- Preceded by: Linang Mandangan
- Succeeded by: Mamarinta Lao

Tarhata Alonto-Lucman (June 26, 1926 – February 26, 2021) was a Filipino politician and Maranao royalty who was the first female governor of the province of Lanao del Sur.

== Early life ==
Tarhata Alonto-Lucman was born on June 26, 1926, to a Maranao royal family with her father being Alauya Alonto, the Sultan of Ramain. At five years old, she was confined in a Christian-run hospital due to a life-threatening condition. During that time, the Maranao preferred to rely on traditional healers and her Muslim family was reluctant to treat her in a hospital over concerns that she might get converted to Christianity. Against Maranao customs at that time she went to study in a school. Prior to entering a public school, she was tutored by American missionaries who were collectively known as the Thomasites.

== Political career ==
Tarhata Alonto-Lucman pursued a political career coming from a family with significant involvement in the government; her father Alauya Alonto and older brother Domocao Alonto were elected in the Senate. Prior to her election as governor of Lanao del Sur in 1971, she came to be known as "Babu Tata" and used her family's influence to resolve conflicts among individuals and clans.

As governor, she was critical of the presidency of Ferdinand Marcos, who established a dictatorship after he imposed Martial Law throughout the Philippines in September 1972. Alonto-Lucman encouraged youth activism among Moros, and supported the Moro separatist movement. She also served as chair for a group of governors of Mindanao.

She was removed from her position in 1975, which led to her family's exile in Saudi Arabia and was only able to return to the Philippines after Marcos was deposed in the 1986 People Power Revolution.

== Death ==
Alonto-Lucman died on February 26, 2021, while she was under confinement at the Amai Pakpak Medical Center in Marawi.

== Personal life ==
Tarhata Alonto was born to a prominent family, with her father Sultan Alauya Alonto serving as a delegate to the Philippine Constitutional Convention of 1934, and serving twice as senator of the Philippines from 1942–1946 and 1946–1949. Her siblings - Domocao Alonto; Hadja Naima Alonto; Abdul Ghafur Madki Alonto; Masiding Alonto, Sr.; and Madrigal Alonto — were all prominent leaders in Lanao. Domocao Alonto served as senator, while Abdul Ghafur Madki Alonto served as governor and ambassador. Tarhata's later husband Rashid Lucman, the Paramount Sultan of Bayang, also served as congressional representative.
