= Basher Dimalaang Manalao =

Filipino Islamic preacher and governor

Aleem Bashier D. Manalao
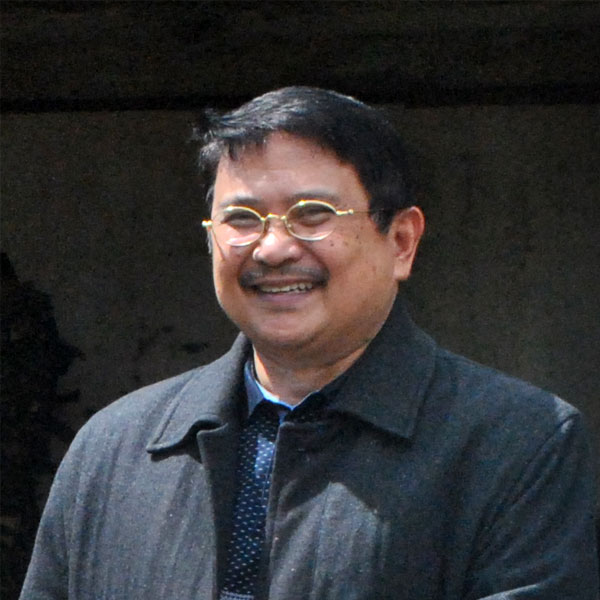

Governor of Lanao del Sur
- In office July 12, 2004 – June 30, 2007
- Vice Governor: Monera Macabangon
- Preceded by: Mamintal Adiong Sr.
- Succeeded by: Mamintal Adiong Jr.

Vice Governor of Lanao del Sur
- In office June 30, 2004 – July 3, 2004
- Governor: Mamintal Adiong Sr.
- Preceded by: Pangnal Datu-Ramos
- Succeeded by: Monera Macabangon

Personal details
- Occupation: Missioner, Politician

Bashier Dimalaang Manalao or known to be Mostaqbal, a Maranao people, Islamic preacher (Ulama or Aleem) and was elected vice-governor then succeeded by law the governor of Lanao del Sur in the Philippines following the death of former governor Mamintal Adiong Sr. in 2004. He took his Islamic degree (Arabic: كوليت) at King Saud University.

He owns an organization Philippine Al-Mostaqbal Incorporation educating members about Islamic cultures, future, and science of Qur’an. Dominant members of his organization were women. The organization established a Facebook page named “Mostaqbal Online Channel” with having over 8.5k followers. He had little or no interest in politics.

He established a public cemetery called “Maqbara” located at Barangay Guimba, Marawi City, Lanao del Sur in the Philippines during his term as governor of the province. Due to political dispute, he was suspended in 3 months by a petition of Monera Macabangon in 2006. He then returned to the office of governor by the decision of the court.

== Early life ==
Mostaqbal was born in his home town Tamparan, Lanao del Sur in the Philippines. He graduated high school at Ma’ahad Mindanao Al-Arabi newly Jamiatu Muslim Mindanao and proceeded to Islamic education at King Saud University.

Known as Mustaqbal ("future"), he is a graduate of Islamic studies from schools in Egypt and Saudi Arabia.

== Political career ==
Manalao, elected in 2004 as vice governor of Lanao del Sur, formally became governor on July 12 under the rule of succession following the death of re-elected governor Mamintal Adiong Sr. three days after the beginning of the term.

Being pro-administration, his tenure saw disputes. In October 2005, Manalao was placed under preventive suspension by the Ombudmsman after members of the Lanao del Sur Provincial Board filed a total of twelve cases against him, as he was accused of nepotism and of anomalous purchasing of police vehicles. The 90-day suspension began on November 5. Vice governor Monera Macabangon was then designated acting provincial governor.

On March 13, 2006, Ombudsman Merceditas Gutierrez dismissed all charges against him and four other provincial officials for lack of probable cause; reinstating him to the office.

In late 2006, Manalao survived an assassination attempt.

He sought re-election in 2007, but lost.

He led Ompia Party, a Moro political party, succeeding its founder, former provincial governor Mahid Mutilan.

== See also ==
- Autonomous Region in Muslim Mindanao
- Bangsamoro Autonomous Region in Muslim Mindanao
- Jamiatu Muslim Mindanao
