= Ansaruddin Alonto Adiong =

Filipino politician (born 1969)

Mayor of Ditsaan-Ramain, Lanao del Sur
- Incumbent
- Assumed office June 30, 2025
- Vice Mayor: Abdul Jabbar Dida-agun
- Preceded by: Saidamen Adiong

Member of the House of Representatives from Lanao del Sur's 1st district
- In office June 30, 2013 – June 30, 2022
- Preceded by: Mohammed Hussin P. Pangandaman
- Succeeded by: Zia Alonto Adiong

Governor of the Autonomous Region in Muslim Mindanao Acting
- In office December 11, 2009 – December 22, 2011
- Vice Governor: Reggie M. Sahali-Generale (Acting)
- Preceded by: Zaldy Ampatuan
- Succeeded by: Mujiv Hataman

Vice Governor of the Autonomous Region in Muslim Mindanao
- In office September 30, 2005 – December 11, 2009
- Governor: Zaldy Ampatuan
- Preceded by: Mahid Mutilan
- Succeeded by: Reggie M. Sahali-Generale (Acting)

Personal details
- Born: Ansaruddin Abdul Malik Alonto Adiong; June 16, 1969 (age 57)
- Party: Nacionalista (2018–present); SIAP (local party; 2005–present)
- Other political affiliations: PDP–Laban (2017–2018); Liberal (2013–2017); Lakas (2005–2013)
- Parent(s): Mamintal Adiong Sr. (father); Soraya Alonto Adiong (mother)
- Relatives: Mamintal Adiong Jr. (brother); Zia Alonto Adiong (brother); Yasser Balindong (cousin); Mujam Adiong (nephew); Domocao Alonto (grandfather); Alauya Alonto (great-grandfather)
- Education: Mindanao State University

Ansaruddin Abdul Malik Alonto Adiong is a Filipino politician. He was the representative of Lanao del Sur's 1st district from 2013 to 2022. He was elected vice governor of the Autonomous Region in Muslim Mindanao (ARMM) in 2005. After Governor Zaldy Ampatuan's removal from office in 2009, Adiong became the acting governor until 2011.

== Personal life ==
A member of a political family of Lanao del Sur, Ansaruddin is the son of Mamintal Adiong Sr. and Soraya Bedjora Adiong. Ansaruddin and his father both served as provincial governor. His elder brother, Mamintal Jr. is now the provincial governor.

His younger brother, Zia, was the deputy speaker at the last legislative assembly of the now-defunct Autonomous Region in Muslim Mindanao (ARMM) and member of the first interim Parliament of the Bangsamoro. Succeeding Ansaruddin, Zia is currently the district representative.

== Political career ==
=== In regional level ===
Adiong was an ARMM assemblyman since 2001.

Adiong and his running mate Zaldy Ampatuan, both ran under Lakas–CMD, were elected vice-governor and governor, respectively, of ARMM in 2005 and in 2008.

On December 10, 2009, pursuant to the rule on succession stated in Republic Act (RA) No. 9054, Adiong, also the regional local government secretary, was sworn in by interior secretary Ronaldo Puno to assume the regional governorship vacated by Ampatuan who was taken into military custody for his alleged involvement in the Maguindanao massacre.

He assumed the said post until his successor was appointed in December 2011 by virtue of RA No. 10153.

=== In Congress ===
Adiong initially filed his candidacy for ARMM vice governor for the 2011 regional elections, originally scheduled on August 8 but later synchronized with the 2013 national elections through RA No. 10153. However, he later opted to run for representative of the first legislative district of Lanao del Sur under the Liberal Party (LP).

Adiong was then elected for three consecutive terms: in 2013 (ran under LP), in 2016 (ran under the same party), and in 2019 (under Nacionalista Party or NP).

On May 11, 2017, Adiong, along with five other LP congressmen, transferred to PDP–Laban. In the 2019 elections, he ran under NP.

Adiong was elected chairman of the House Committee on Muslim Affairs of the 18th Congress.

=== As municipal mayor ===
In 2025, Adiong ran under the NP and was elected mayor in his hometown in Ditsaan-Ramain, Lanao del Sur.
