= Philippine House Committee on Muslim Affairs =

Standing committee of the House of Representatives of the Philippines

Committee on Muslim Affairs
- 20th Congress

History
- New session started: To convene on July 28, 2025

Leadership
- Chairman: Vacant
- Minority Leader: Vacant

Website
- Committee on Muslim Affairs

The Philippine House Committee on Muslim Affairs, or House Muslim Affairs Committee is a standing committee of the Philippine House of Representatives.

== Jurisdiction ==
As prescribed by House Rules, the committee's jurisdiction is on Muslim affairs which includes the following:

- Development of predominantly Muslim areas
- Welfare of Muslim Filipinos

== Members, 20th Congress ==
As of June 30, 2025, all committee membership positions are vacant until the House convenes for its first regular session on July 28.

== Historical membership rosters ==
=== 18th Congress ===
Position	Members	Party	Province/City	District
Chairperson	Ansaruddin Abdul Malik Adiong	Nacionalista	Lanao del Sur	1st
Vice Chairpersons	Yasser Balindong	Lakas	Lanao del Sur	2nd
Vice Chairpersons	Datu Roonie Sinsuat Sr.	PDP–Laban	Maguindanao	1st
Vice Chairpersons	Amihilda Sangcopan	Anak Mindanao	Party-list	
Members for the Majority	Mohamad Khalid Dimaporo	PDP–Laban	Lanao del Norte	1st
Members for the Majority	Esmael Mangudadatu	PDP–Laban	Maguindanao	2nd
Members for the Majority	Munir Arbison	Nacionalista	Sulu	2nd
Members for the Majority	Abdullah Dimaporo	NPC	Lanao del Norte	2nd
Members for the Majority	Princess Riha Sakaluran	NUP	Sultan Kudarat	1st
Members for the Majority	Rashidin Matba	PDP–Laban	Tawi-Tawi	Lone
Members for the Majority	Shernee Tan	Kusug Tausug	Party-list	
Members for the Minority	Godofredo Guya	RECOBODA	Party-list	
Members for the Minority	Angelica Natasha Co	BHW	Party-list	

== See also ==
- House of Representatives of the Philippines
- List of Philippine House of Representatives committees
- National Commission on Muslim Filipinos
