= Mamintal Adiong Jr. =

Filipino civil engineer and politician (born 1965)

Datu Mamintal Adiong Jr.
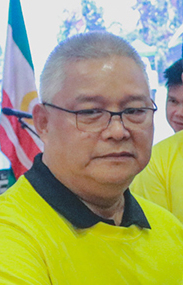
- Adiong in 2023

Governor of Lanao del Sur
- Incumbent
- Assumed office June 30, 2019
- Vice Governor: Mohammad Khalid Adiong
- Preceded by: Soraya Bedjora Adiong
- In office June 30, 2007 – June 30, 2016
- Preceded by: Basher Dimalaang Manalao
- Succeeded by: Soraya Alonto Adiong

Vice Governor of Lanao del Sur
- In office June 30, 2016 – June 30, 2019

Personal details
- Born: Mamintal Alonto Adiong Jr. March 17, 1965 (age 61) Marawi, Lanao del Sur, Philippines
- Party: Lakas (2007–2012; 2018–present); SIAP (local party; 2004–present)
- Other political affiliations: Liberal (2012–2018)
- Spouse(s): Raifa Sani Raki-in (m. 1993–2016) Sittie Aisah M. Towawis (m. 2016)
- Children: Mohammad Khalid R. Adiong
- Parent(s): Mamintal M. Adiong Sr. (father); Soraya A. Adiong (mother)
- Relatives: Ansaruddin Alonto Adiong (brother); Zia Alonto Adiong (brother); Yasser Balindong (cousin); Domocao Alonto (grandfather); Alauya Alonto (great-grandfather)
- Profession: Politician, civil engineer

Datu Mamintal "Bombit" Alonto Adiong Jr. (born March 17, 1965) is a Filipino civil engineer and politician who currently serves as the governor of the province of Lanao del Sur from 2007 to 2016, and from 2019 up to present.

== Family ==
He was born to a powerful political family and raised in local Lanao del Sur politics. Mamintal Jr. is the eldest son of Mamintal Adiong Sr. and Soraya Bedjora Adiong, who both served as governor of Lanao del Sur. His father was largely credited for the landslide victory of President Gloria Macapagal Arroyo and her slate in the 2004 elections.

His younger brother, Ansaruddin, was the acting governor of the Autonomous Region in Muslim Mindanao (ARMM) and the representative of the province's 1st legislative district prior to being the incumbent mayor in their hometown in Ditsaan-Ramain. A cousin of him, Zia, was the deputy speaker at the last ARMM legislative assembly and member of the first interim Parliament of the Bangsamoro and is currently the district representative, succeeding Ansaruddin.

Married to Raifa Sani Raki-in, he is the father of Mamintal III (Sangguniang Kabataan provincial president, 2007–10), Mohammad Khalid or Mujam (SK provincial president, 2010–13) who is the incumbent provincial vice governor, Soraya Harifa, and Abdul Malic.

== Personal life ==
He is a civil engineer by profession.

== Political career ==
Adiong started his career in politics in 1996 as an appointed board member, and was elected to the same position in 1998. In 2001, he went on to become the province's sports officer and concurrently appointed as the Provincial Administrator of by his father, then-Governor Mamintal Adiong Sr. In 2003, he assumed the OIC provincial engineer position. He also worked in the private sector—as CEO of MMA Construction and Development Corporation and was involved in the ARMM Social Fund Project.

In 2006, Adiong was appointed as member of the newly-established ARMM Social Fund Project, representing the business community.

Adiong, ran under Lakas–CMD, was elected as provincial governor in 2007, along with his running mate, former Department of the Interior and Local Government-ARMM Regional Secretary Datu RPK Arsad Marohombsar, as vice governor, against the tandem of incumbent Marawi city mayor Omar Ali and Assemblyman Jamil Lucman; 2nd District representative Benasing Macarambon Jr. and re-electionist vice governor Monera Dimakuta-Macabangon; and re-electionist governor Basher Dimalaang Manalao of Ompia Party. He was re-elected in 2010, defeating Ali again, and in 2013.

Prior to 2013 elections, on July 25, 2012, Adiong, along with 163 other ARMM officials, took oath as member of the Liberal Party (LP).

In 2014, a group, claiming that Adiong had debts prior to his governorship, filed plunder and graft complaints against him before the Ombudsman for alleged unexplained increase in his net worth.

In 2016, he was elected as provincial vice-governor, with his mother, Soraya Alonto Adiong, succeeding him as governor. Both ran under LP.

Adiong, returned to Lakas, was elected again as provincial governor in 2019 and in 2022.

=== Attacks against Adiong ===
In 2007, unidentified gunmen attacked Adiong's house in Marawi; none was hurt.

On February 17, 2023, he, along with a civilian aide, was injured by unidentified gunmen in an ambush on his convoy. Four of his companions were killed during the attack. In connection with the incident, three of the suspects, including an alleged mastermind, a gang leader, were killed in police operations; five others were arrested. Three individuals, said to have links with local terrorist group Dawlah Islamiya, were charged with murder, frustrated murder and attempted murder before the Marawi Regional Trial Court; one of them remains at large.

== Electoral history ==
Electoral history of Mamintal Adiong Jr.
Year	Office	Party		Votes received				Result
Year	Office	Local	National	Total	%	P.	Swing	Result
2007	Governor of Lanao del Sur	SIAP	Lakas	111,295	35.74%	1st	—N/a	Won
2010	Governor of Lanao del Sur	SIAP	Lakas	160,181	70.27%	1st	—N/a	Won
2013	Governor of Lanao del Sur	SIAP	Liberal	186,879	67.69%	1st	—N/a	Won
2019	Governor of Lanao del Sur	SIAP	Lakas	263,033	72.12%	1st	—N/a	Won
2022	Governor of Lanao del Sur	SIAP	Lakas	353,769	74.22%	1st	—N/a	Won
2025	Governor of Lanao del Sur	SIAP	Lakas	382,050	70.68%	1st	—N/a	Won
2016	Vice Governor of Lanao del Sur	SIAP	Liberal	253,753	—N/a	1st	—N/a	Won
