= Yasser Balindong =

Filipino politician (born 1974)

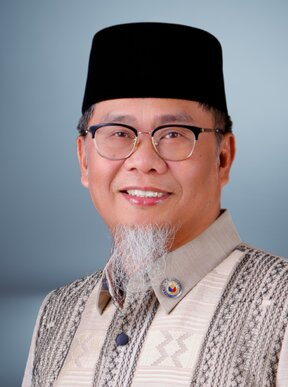
- Official portrait, 2025

Deputy Speaker of the House of Representatives of the Philippines
- Incumbent
- Assumed office November 7, 2023
- House Speaker: Martin Romualdez; Faustino "Bojie" Dy III

Member of the Philippine House of Representatives from Lanao del Sur's 2nd district
- Incumbent
- Assumed office June 30, 2019
- Preceded by: Mauyag Papandayan Jr.

Member of the ARMM Regional Legislative Assembly from Lanao del Sur's 2nd district
- In office 2005–2016

Personal details
- Born: February 28, 1974 (age 52) Lanao del Sur, Philippines
- Party: Lakas (2018–present); SIAP (local party; 2015–present)
- Other political affiliations: Liberal (2015–2018)
- Parent(s): Pangalian Balindong (father); Hadja Jamila Alonto (mother)
- Relatives: Mamintal Adiong Jr. (cousin); Ansaruddin Alonto Adiong (cousin); Zia Alonto Adiong (cousin); Domocao Alonto (grandfather); Alauya Alonto (great-grandfather)
- Education: University of the Philippines Diliman (B.A.); San Beda College (LL.B.)
- Occupation: Politician

Yasser Alonto Balindong (born February 28, 1974) is a Filipino politician who has served as the representative for Lanao del Sur's second district since 2019. A member of Lakas, he has also served as a deputy speaker since November 2023.

== Early life and education ==
Balindong was born on February 28, 1974. He earned his degree in political science from the University of the Philippines Diliman and later pursued law at San Beda College.

He is the son of Atty. Pangalian Balindong, who served as the former House Deputy Speaker and former Bangsamoro Autonomous Region in Muslim Mindanao (BARMM) Parliament Speaker.

== Political career ==
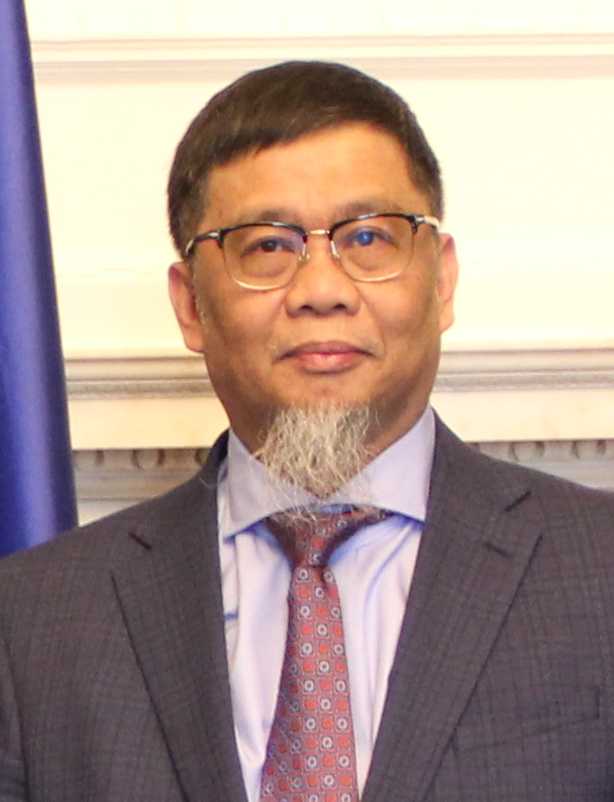
Balindong in 2024

Balindong began his political career as an assemblyman in the Autonomous Region in Muslim Mindanao (ARMM).

In 2019, he was elected as representative of Lanao del Sur’s 2nd District. He has since been re-elected, serving his third consecutive term in the House of Representatives.

He rose to the post of Deputy Speaker in the 19th Congress following a House reorganization in November 2023, after the demotion of former president Gloria Macapagal-Arroyo and Davao City Representative Isidro Ungab.

== Legislative work ==
Balindong supported the passage of the Bangsamoro Organic Law. He is also one of the principal authors of the controversial Maharlika Investment Fund under the Marcos administration.
