= Soraya Bedjora Adiong =

Filipino politician

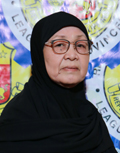
- Adiong in 2016

Governor of Lanao del Sur
- In office June 30, 2016 – June 30, 2019
- Vice Governor: Mamintal Adiong Jr.
- Preceded by: Mamintal Adiong Jr.
- Succeeded by: Mamintal Adiong Jr.

Personal details
- Born: Soraya Bedjora Malawani Alonto; January 7, 1944
- Died: December 27, 2024 (aged 80)
- Party: Liberal (2015–2024)
- Spouse: Mamintal Adiong Sr. (d. 2004)
- Children: 7, including Mamintal Jr., Ansaruddin and Zia
- Occupation: Politician

Soraya Bedjora Alonto-Adiong (born Soraya Bedjora Malawani Alonto; January 7, 1944 – December 27, 2024) was a Filipino politician who served as Governor of Lanao del Sur from 2016 to 2019. She was the second woman to lead the predominantly Muslim province. Her termed was marred by the Siege of Marawi in 2017.

== Personal life ==
Adiong belonged to the prominent Alonto clan of Lanao del Sur. She was the daughter of former senator Domocao Alonto and Momihna Malawani Alonto. Her grandfather, Alauya Porad Alonto, was a signatory to the 1935 Constitution. She was also the grandniece of Berua Alonto, the first mayor of Marawi, and the niece of Abdul Ghaffur Madki Alangadi Alonto, the first Muslim member of the Philippine cabinet who later became Lanao del Sur’s first governor.

Adiong was married to Mamintal Adiong Sr., who also became governor of Lanao del Sur. Their children include politicians Mamintal Adiong Jr., who also became governor of Lanao del Sur, and congressional representatives Zia Alonto Adiong and Ansaruddin Alonto Adiong.

== See also ==
- List of female governors in the Philippines
