= Benasing Macarambon Jr. =

Filipino politician

Benasing Onayan Macarambon Jr. is a Filipino politician who served as representative of the Second District of Lanao del Sur, Philippines (1998–2007). In 2018, he was appointed by President Rodrigo Duterte a Subic Bay Metropolitan Authority board member and director until September 22, 2022.

Prior to being a legislator, on December 29, 1987, Macarambon was designated by then Secretary of Local Government Luis T. Santos as member of the Sangguniang Pampook (Regional Assembly) in Region XII. The said position was ceased as being abolished by the enactment in 1989 of Republic Act (RA) No. 6734, setting the elections in the Autonomous Region in Muslim Mindanao.

As a legislator, he authored numerous House bills, among them an act granting the Muslim Development Multipurpose Cooperative a broadcast franchise (RA No. 9171) and another creating a secondary school in Sultan Gumander, Lanao del Sur (RA No. 8912).

In 2007, he ran for provincial governor under Kabalikat ng Malayang Pilipino but lost.

He is a leader of the Moro National Liberation Front and an advocate for the ecological protection of Lake Lanao.
