= Mamintal Adiong Sr. =

Filipino politician (1936-2004)

Mamintal M. Adiong, Sr.
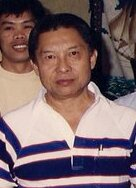
- Adiong in 1994

Governor of Lanao del Sur
- In office June 30, 2001 – July 3, 2004
- Vice Governor: Pangnal Datu-Ramos (2001–2004); Bashier Manalao (2004)
- Preceded by: Mahid Mutilan
- Succeeded by: Bashier Manalao

Member of the Philippine House of Representatives from Lanao del Sur's First District
- In office June 30, 1992 – June 30, 2001
- Preceded by: Vacant (Omar Dianalan died in 1990.)
- Succeeded by: Faysah Maniri-Racman Dumarpa

Personal details
- Born: August 8, 1936 Marawi, Lanao, Philippine Commonwealth
- Died: July 3, 2004 (aged 67) Iligan, Lanao del Norte, Philippines
- Party: Lakas (1992–2001; 2003–2004); SIAP (local party; 2002–2004)
- Other political affiliations: PMP (2001–2003)
- Spouse: Soraya Bedjora Adiong
- Children: 7, including Mamintal Jr., Ansaruddin and Zia

Mamintal M. Adiong Sr. (August 8, 1936 – July 3, 2004) was a long-time Filipino politician, served as representative of Lanao del Sur to the Philippine Congress (1992–2001) and as provincial governor from 2001 until his death from cardiac arrest in 2004. He was largely credited for the landslide victory of President Gloria Arroyo and her slate in the 2004 elections.

== Early life ==
Adiong was born in Saduc, Marawi, Lanao del Sur. He was orphaned at young age.

He finished the degrees Bachelor of Science in civil engineering and Master of Science in sanitary engineering from the National University.

He worked at Marawi Waterworks District (MWSA); also as provincial engineer of Lanao del Sur and as director of the Philippine Association of Free Labor Unions.

Prior to being a legislator, an engineer by profession, he was an international contractor and became known for his involvement in construction projects in Saudi Arabia.

== Political career ==
Adiong was appointed undersecretary of the Department of Public Works and Highways during the presidency of Corazon Aquino.

Adiong ran for representative of the first district of Lanao del Sur in the 1987 elections but lost to Omar Dianalan, who had his term unfinished upon his death in 1990. Later, he served as a three-term representative of the said district from 1992 to 2001.

He was elected as provincial governor in 2001 and in 2004, at that time defeating Mahid Mutilan, who has since reassumed the vice-governorship of the Autonomous Region in Muslim Mindanao (ARMM).

Adiong is credited for the infrastructure projects in the province, the completion and beautification of the provincial capitol and the Governor's Palace, the renewed dynamism of local government personnel and their observance of a strict work ethic.

== Personal life ==
The Adiongs have held various government positions in Lanao del Sur for years.

He married Soraya Bedjora Adiong, who later served as provincial governor. They have six children, including three sons who are incumbent politicians.

- His eldest son, Mamintal Jr., is the incumbent provincial governor.
- Ansaruddin was an assemblyman and the acting governor of the ARMM, and became district representative prior to being the incumbent mayor in their hometown in Ditsaan-Ramain.
- Zia became deputy speaker at the last ARMM legislative assembly and member of the first interim Parliament of the Bangsamoro, and is currently the district representative.

== Death ==
On June 30, 2004, the same day he took his oath of office, he was brought to a hospital in Iligan because of high fever. Three days later, he died there of a heart attack; his remains were buried in his hometown in Ditsaan-Ramain in traditional Muslim rites.

== Legacy ==
While serving as provincial governor, he planned a project, a highway connecting Marawi to Wao, which was later realized by his son, then district representative Ansaruddin, who later authored a measure to rename the road in his father's honor. In December 2021, President Rodrigo Duterte signed into law an act renaming Marawi-Maguing-Bumbaran-Wao Road as Gov. Mamintal M. Adiong Sr. National Road.

== Electoral history ==
Electoral history of Mamintal Adiong Sr.
Year	Office	Party	Votes received				Result
Year	Office	Party	Total	%	P.	Swing	Result
1992	Representative (Lanao del Sur–1st)	Lakas	32,489	24.48%	1st	—N/a	Won
1995	Representative (Lanao del Sur–1st)	Lakas	—N/a	—N/a	1st	—N/a	Won
1998	Representative (Lanao del Sur–1st)	Lakas	80,307	53.77%	1st	—N/a	Won
2001	Governor of Lanao del Sur	PMP	59,485	26.15%	1st	—N/a	Won
2004	Governor of Lanao del Sur	Lakas	94,557	—N/a	1st	—N/a	Won
