= Governor of Lanao del Sur =

Local chief executive

Provincial Governor of Lanao del Sur
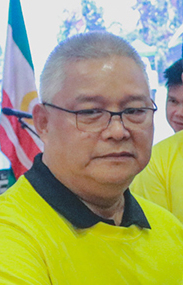
- Incumbent; Mamintal Adiong Jr. since June 30, 2019
- Appointer: Elected via popular vote
- Term length: 3 years
- Formation: 1959

The governor of Lanao del Sur (Filipino: Punong Panlalawigan ng Lanao del Sur), is the chief executive of the provincial government of Lanao del Sur.

== List ==
No.	Image	Governor	Term	Party
1		Abdul Ghafur Madki Alonto	1959–1967	
2		Linang Mandangan	1967–1971	
3		Tarhata Alonto-Lucman	1971–1975	
4		Mamarinta Lao	1975–1976	
5		Mohammad Ali Dimaporo	1976–March 1986	
6		Saidamen B. Pangarungan	March–September 1986	
7		Tarhata Alonto-Lucman	September 1986–1988	
8		Saidamen B. Pangarungan	1988–1992	
9		Mahid Mutilan	1992–2001	
10		Mamintal Adiong Sr.	2001–July 2004 (died in office)	PMP
11		Basher D. Manalao	July 2004–2007	
12		Mamintal A. Adiong Jr.	2007–2016	Lakas–CMD
12		Mamintal A. Adiong Jr.	2007–2016	Liberal
13		Soraya Bedjora A. Adiong	2016–2019	Liberal
14		Mamintal A. Adiong Jr.	2019–present	Lakas–CMD
