= Alauya Alonto =

Filipino Muslim politician from Lanao

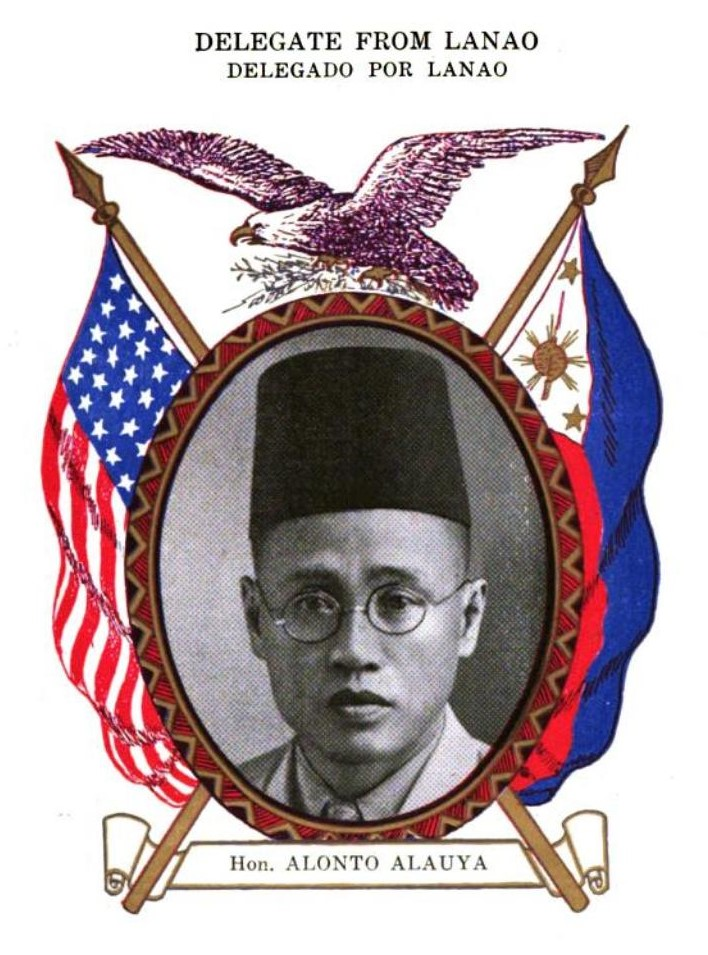
- Alonto as a delegate to the Philippine Constitutional Convention, published by Benipayo Press (c. 1935)

Senator of the Philippines
- In office July 9, 1945 – December 30, 1947

Member of the House of Representatives of the Philippine Islands from Department of Mindanao and Sulu's Lone District
- In office 1934 – September 16, 1935 Serving with Manuel Fortich, Julian A. Rodriguez, Julian A. Rodriguez, and Ombra Amilbangsa
- Appointed by: Frank Murphy

Sultan of Ramain
- Reign: c. 1912–?
- Born: c. 1875; Ramain, Lanao, Confederate States of Lanao (present day Ditsaan-Ramain, Lanao del Sur)
- Died: 1959 (aged 83–84); Marawi, Philippines
- Spouse: Bariga Alangadi
- Issue: 6 (including Domocao and Tarhata)
Names
- Alauya Alonto
- House: Ramain
- Father: Datu Alonto
- Mother: Dayang Dayang Adiong
- Religion: Islam

Alauya Alonto (c. 1875–1959) was a Muslim Filipino politician from Lanao best known for being a Delegate to the Constitutional Convention of 1934, and a one-term senator of the Philippines, serving from 1945 to 1947.

== Early life and education ==
Alonto was born in Ramain, Lanao, shortly before the outbreak of the Spanish–American War. His father was Datu Alonto of Maul, Marantao; and his mother was Bae Dayang Dayang Adiong of Ditsaan-Ramain.

He studied under the mentorship of Hadji Nosca Aloz, the highest Pandita of Lanao, and studied Arabic literature and jurisprudence.

== Career ==
In 1912, he became the Sultan of Ramain. He organized the "Filipinista" party in Lanao.

He served as appointed Municipal Manager under the Philippine Independence Commission in 1924, as an appointed representative for Department of Mindanao and Sulu from 1934 to 1935 by Governor-General Frank Murphy, and elected Delegate to the Constitutional Convention in 1934.

He was elected senator in 1941. However, due to World War II, he began serving his first term in 1945 until 1947.

== Family and descendants ==
Sultan Alonto Alauya married the Bae Bariga Alangadi of Ramain, by whom he had six children:

- Senator Domocao Alonto;
- Hadja Naima Alonto;
- Governor and Ambassador Abdul Ghafur Madki Alonto;
- Masiding Alonto, Sr.;
- Governor Princess Tarhata Alonto-Lucman; and
- Madrigal Alonto.
