= Speaker of the ARMM Regional Legislative Assembly =

Defunct political position in the Philippines

- Tagapagsalita ng Pangrehiyong Kapulungang Pambatasan ng ARMM
- Seal of ARMM Regional Legislative Assembly
- Style: Mr. Speaker (informal); The Honorable (formal)
- Seat: Regional Legislative Assembly Building, Cotabato City
- Appointer: ARMM Regional Legislative Assembly
- Formation: June 30, 1990; 36 years ago
- First holder: Ismael Abubakar Jr.
- Final holder: Datu Roonie Sinsuat
- Abolished: February 22, 2019; 7 years ago
- Superseded by: Speaker of the Bangsamoro Parliament
- Deputy: Speaker pro tempore

The speaker of the ARMM Regional Legislative Assembly (Filipino: Tagapagsalita ng Pangrehiyong Kapulungang Pambatasan ng ARMM) was the presiding officer of the ARMM Regional Legislative Assembly, the devolved unicameral regional legislature of now-defunct Autonomous Region in Muslim Mindanao (ARMM) of the Philippines.

The position was established in 1990, with Ismael Abubakar Jr. as the first speaker of the Assembly. The last officeholder was Datu Roonie Sinsuat, serving from 2013 to 2019.

It was succeeded by the position of Speaker of the Bangsamoro Parliament upon the establishment of the Bangsamoro Autonomous Region in Muslim Mindanao in 2019, with Pangalian Balindong as the first speaker of the interim Parliament.

A speaker pro tempore was elected by the Assembly to assume the duties of the speaker in his or her absence.

== List of known speakers ==
Portrait	Name (Birth–Death)	Term of office		Party	Legislature
Portrait	Name (Birth–Death)	Took office	Left office	Party	Legislature
	Ismael Abubakar Jr. Member for Tawi-Tawi (1949–2017)	June 30, 1990	1991	Unknown	1st Assembly
	Pangalian Balindong; Member for Lanao del Sur–2nd (1940–2025)	1991	1993	Unknown	1st Assembly
	Guimid Matalam; Member for Maguindanao–2nd (1937–2022)	1993	1996	Lakas	2nd Assembly
	Alvarez Isnaji; Member for Sulu–1st	1996	June 2001	Unknown	3rd Assembly
	Datu Ombra Datumanong; Member for Maguindanao–2nd	January 2002	August 2002	Lakas	4th Assembly
	Ibrahim Ibay; Member for Maguindanao–1st (born 1967)	August 2002	May 2003	Unknown	4th Assembly
	Ismael Abubakar Jr. (Note: Ibrahim Ibay disputed the speakership of Ismael Abubakar Jr. from May to August 2003.); Member for Tawi-Tawi (1949–2017)	May 2003	August 27, 2003	Unknown	4th Assembly
	Abraham Burahan; Member for Sulu–1st	August 27, 2003	September 2003	Unknown	4th Assembly
	Ismael Abubakar Jr. Member for Tawi-Tawi (1949–2017)	September 2003	April 28, 2004	Unknown	4th Assembly
	Hatimil Hassan; Member for Basilan (born 1949)	April 28, 2004	May 8, 2006	Lakas	4th Assembly
	Hatimil Hassan; Member for Basilan (born 1949)	April 28, 2004	May 8, 2006	Lakas	5th Assembly
	Paisalin Tago; Member for Lanao del Sur–1st (born 1967)	May 8, 2006	Unknown	Liberal	5th Assembly
	Regie Sahali-Generale; Member for Tawi-Tawi	May 2009	July 5, 2010	Lakas	6th Assembly
	Datu Roonie Sinsuat; Member for Maguindanao–1st (born 1954)	July 5, 2010	May 14, 2012	Lakas	6th Assembly
	Rasol Mitmug Jr. Member for Lanao del Sur–1st	May 14, 2012	July 1, 2013	Unknown	7th Assembly
	Datu Roonie Sinsuat; Member for Maguindanao–1st (born 1954)	July 1, 2013	February 22, 2019	Liberal	8th Assembly
	Datu Roonie Sinsuat; Member for Maguindanao–1st (born 1954)	July 1, 2013	February 22, 2019	Liberal	9th Assembly
Position abolished (since February 22, 2019)

== List of known speakers pro tempore ==
Portrait	Name (Birth–Death)	Term of office		Party	Legislature
Portrait	Name (Birth–Death)	Took office	Left office	Party	Legislature
	Suharto Midtimbang; Member for Maguindanao–2nd	Unknown		Unknown	4th Assembly
	Regie Sahali-Generale; Member for Tawi-Tawi	Unknown		Lakas	5th Assembly
	Datu Ombra Datumanong; Member for Maguindanao–2nd	May 2009	July 5, 2010	Lakas	6th Assembly
	Abdel Anni; Member for Sulu–2nd	July 5, 2010	May 14, 2012	KAMPI	6th Assembly
	Dayang Carlsun Sangkula-Jumaide; Member for Tawi-Tawi	May 14, 2012	July 1, 2013	Unknown	7th Assembly
	Myrna Ajihil; Member for Tawi-Tawi	July 1, 2013	2016	Unknown	8th Assembly
Position abolished (since February 22, 2019)

== See also ==
- Speaker of the Bangsamoro Parliament
