= 4th ARMM Regional Legislative Assembly =

←	3rd Assembly	5th Assembly	→

Overview
- Jurisdiction: Autonomous Region in Muslim Mindanao, Philippines
- Term: 2001 – 2005
- Members: 24
- Speaker: Ibrahim Ibay (disputed from May 2003 – August 2003) Ismael Abubakar Jr. (May–August 2003); Abraham Burahan (from August 2003)

The Fourth ARMM Regional Legislative Assembly was a meeting of the unicameral regional legislature of the Autonomous Region in Muslim Mindanao.

The fourth assembly experienced a leadership crisis involving the position of Assembly Speaker in 2003. Ibrahim Ibay's post as speaker was placed into dispute, when Ismael Abubakar Jr. of Tawi-Tawi with the support of 12 assemblyman held an unannounced session in which they declared the position of assembly speaker vacant with the present assemblymen electing Abubakar as speaker. Abraham Burahan was elected as speaker in a special session in August 2003 and was supported by 13 assemblymen including Ibay.

== Members ==
Province	District	Assemblyman	Party
Basilan	Lone	Rajam Akbar	
Basilan	Lone	Hatimil Hassan	
Basilan	Lone	Harisul Samanul	
Lanao del Sur	1st	Ansaruddin Adiong	
Lanao del Sur	1st	Suhayla Salic	
Lanao del Sur	1st	Paisalin Tago	
Lanao del Sur	2nd	Alexander Menor	
Lanao del Sur	2nd	Sultan Usman Sarangani	
Lanao del Sur	2nd	Saaduddin Alauya, Jr.	
Maguindanao	1st	Jackson Bandila	
Maguindanao	1st	Ibrahim Ibay	
Maguindanao	1st	Tommy Ala	
Maguindanao	2nd	Powa Mangudadatu	
Maguindanao	2nd	Suharto Midtimbang	
Maguindanao	2nd	Umbrah Datumanong	
Sulu	1st	Abraham Burahan	
Sulu	1st	Garcia Tingkahan	
Sulu	1st	Kabir Hayudini	
Sulu	2nd	Rouhulla Abdurajak	
Sulu	2nd	Maulana Omar	
Sulu	2nd	Juliet Tammang	
Tawi-Tawi	Lone	Ruby Sahali	
Tawi-Tawi	Lone	Annuar Abubakar	
Tawi-Tawi	Lone	Ismael Abubakar Jr.	

== See also ==
- Autonomous Region in Muslim Mindanao
- ARMM Regional Legislative Assembly
