= 2nd ARMM Regional Legislative Assembly =

←	1st Assembly	3rd Assembly	→

Overview
- Jurisdiction: Autonomous Region in Muslim Mindanao, Philippines
- Term: 1993 – 1996
- Members: 21

The Second ARMM Regional Legislative Assembly was a meeting of the unicameral regional legislature of the Autonomous Region in Muslim Mindanao.

== Members ==
Province	District	Assemblyman	Party
Lanao del Sur	1st	Princess Johayra Pangarungan	LDP
Lanao del Sur	1st	Faysah Dumarpa	PDP–Laban
Lanao del Sur	1st	Mangurun Batuampar (April 1, 1993–May 13, 1996)	Independent
Lanao del Sur	1st	Acmad Tomawis (May 28, 1996–September 30, 1996)	LDP
Lanao del Sur	2nd	Jamil Lucman	Lakas–Ompia
Lanao del Sur	2nd	Benasing Macarambon, Jr.	Lakas–Ompia
Lanao del Sur	2nd	Ali Pangalian Balindong	IPP–LDP
Maguindanao	1st	Bongarsa Tomawis	Lakas
Maguindanao	1st	Ibrahim Ibay	IPP
Maguindanao	1st	Bimbo Sinsuat	NPC–Lakas
Maguindanao	2nd	Zaldy Ampatuan	Lakas
Maguindanao	2nd	Guimid Matalam	Lakas
Maguindanao	2nd	Pike Mentang (April 1, 1993–January 16, 1994)	IPP–LDP
Maguindanao	2nd	Ali Bernan (January 17, 1994–September 30, 1996)	Lakas
Sulu	1st	Abdulgajer Ismael	IPP–LDP
Sulu	1st	Benezar Tulawie	IPP–LDP
Sulu	1st	Abdulrajik Maldisa	IPP–LDP
Sulu	2nd	Wilson Anni	Lakas
Sulu	2nd	Mctmir Tillah	Lakas
Sulu	2nd	Anton Burahan (April 1, 1993–Mar. 13, 1995)	Lakas
Sulu	2nd	Abdulajid Estino (March 14, 1995–September 30, 1996)	IPP–LDP
Tawi-Tawi	Lone	Ruby Sahali	Independent
Tawi-Tawi	Lone	Annuar Abubakar	Lakas
Tawi-Tawi	Lone	Ismael Abubakar Jr.	NPC

== See also ==
- Autonomous Region in Muslim Mindanao
- ARMM Regional Legislative Assembly
