= 6th ARMM Regional Legislative Assembly =

Parliament in the Philippines

←	5th Assembly	7th Assembly	→

Overview
- Jurisdiction: Autonomous Region in Muslim Mindanao, Philippines
- Term: 2008 – 2012
- Members: 24
- Speaker: Rejie Sahali-Generale (until July 5, 2010); Ronnie Sinsuat (from July 5, 2010)

The Sixth ARMM Regional Legislative Assembly was a meeting of the unicameral regional legislature of the Autonomous Region in Muslim Mindanao (ARMM).

The meeting was headed by Rejie Sahali-Generale who was speaker until July 5, 2010, when she became Acting Vice Governor of the ARMM. From that date Ronnie Sinsuat served as speaker of the assembly.

== Members ==
Province	District	Assemblyman	Party
Basilan	Lone	Rajam Akbar	Lakas
Basilan	Lone	Nasser Asarul	Independent
Basilan	Lone	Juhan Hataman	Nacionalista
Lanao del Sur	1st	Zia Alonto Adiong	Lakas
Lanao del Sur	1st	Samer Salic	Lakas
Lanao del Sur	1st	Suhayla Salic	Lakas
Lanao del Sur	2nd	Rasmia Usman Romato Salic	Lakas
Lanao del Sur	2nd	Yasser Balindong	Lakas
Lanao del Sur	2nd	Alexander B.M. Menor	Lakas
Maguindanao	1st	Roonie Sinsuat	Lakas
Maguindanao	1st	Cahar Ibay	KAMPI
Maguindanao	1st	Abdulradzak Tomawis	KAMPI
Maguindanao	2nd	Umbrah Datumanong	Lakas
Maguindanao	2nd	Khadafeh Mangudadatu	Lakas
Maguindanao	2nd	Pike Mentang	Lakas
Sulu	1st	Nivocadnezar Tulawie	Lakas
Sulu	1st	Rizal Tingkahan Jr.	Lakas
Sulu	1st	Nahil Maldisa	Lakas
Sulu	2nd	Benshar Estino	KAMPI
Sulu	2nd	Nashruper Daud	Lakas
Sulu	2nd	Abdel Anni	KAMPI
Tawi-Tawi	Lone	Rejie Sahali-Generale	Lakas
Tawi-Tawi	Lone	Mustapha Omar	Independent
Tawi-Tawi	Lone	Nur-Mahadil Ahaja	Independent

== See also ==
- Autonomous Region in Muslim Mindanao
- ARMM Regional Legislative Assembly
