= 9th ARMM Regional Legislative Assembly =

Parliament in the Philippines

←	8th Assembly	Legislature abolished; succeeded by the 1st Bangsamoro Transition Authority Parliament	→

Overview
- Jurisdiction: Autonomous Region in Muslim Mindanao, Philippines
- Term: 2016 – 2019
- Members: 24
- Speaker: Ronnie Sinsuat

The Ninth ARMM Regional Legislative Assembly was the last meeting of the unicameral regional legislature of the Autonomous Region in Muslim Mindanao (ARMM). Due to the ratification of the Bangsamoro Organic Law creating the Bangsamoro Autonomous Region which replaced the ARMM, the election of legislators for a tenth meeting of the assembly was cancelled.

Ronnie Sinsuat was the last speaker of the last meeting of the assembly.

== Members ==
Province	District	Assemblyman	Party
Basilan	Lone	Ronie Hantian	Independent
Basilan	Lone	Haber Asarul	Independent
Basilan	Lone	Ahmad Ali Ismael	Independent
Lanao del Sur	1st	Amenodin Sumagayan	Independent
Lanao del Sur	1st	Zia Alonto Adiong	Independent
Lanao del Sur	1st	Rolan Abdul Rashid Macarambon	Independent
Lanao del Sur	2nd	Farouk Macarambon Jr.	Aksyon
Lanao del Sur	2nd	Alexander Menor	Liberal
Lanao del Sur	2nd	Abol Alam Padate	Independent
Maguindanao	1st	Cahar Ibay	Liberal
Maguindanao	1st	Ronnie Sinsuat	Liberal
Maguindanao	1st	Harold Tomawis	Liberal
Maguindanao	2nd	Khadafeh Mangudadatu	Liberal
Maguindanao	2nd	Sidik Amiril	UNA
Maguindanao	2nd	Pearl Joy Piang	Liberal
Sulu	1st	Nedra Burahan	Liberal
Sulu	1st	Rizal Tingkahan Jr.	Liberal
Sulu	1st	Hanibal Tulawie	Liberal
Sulu	2nd	Rudjia Anni	Independent
Sulu	2nd	Irene Tillah	Independent
Sulu	2nd	Nashruper Daud	Independent
Tawi-Tawi	Lone	Romel Matba	NUP
Tawi-Tawi	Lone	Rodolfo Bawasanta	Independent
Tawi-Tawi	Lone	Nur–Mahadil K. Ahaja	NUP

== See also ==
- Autonomous Region in Muslim Mindanao
- ARMM Regional Legislative Assembly
