= 1st ARMM Regional Legislative Assembly =

2nd Assembly	→

Overview
- Jurisdiction: Autonomous Region in Muslim Mindanao, Philippines
- Term: 1990 – 1993

The First ARMM Regional Legislative Assembly was a meeting of the unicameral regional legislature of the Autonomous Region in Muslim Mindanao.

== Members ==
Province	District	Assemblyman	Party
Lanao del Sur	1st	Princess Johayra Pangarungan	
Lanao del Sur	1st	Padilla Pundaodaya	
Lanao del Sur	1st	Tago Sarip	
Lanao del Sur	1st	Acmad Tomawis	
Lanao del Sur	2nd	Ali Pangalian Balindong	
Lanao del Sur	2nd	Ismael Camid	
Lanao del Sur	2nd	Taib Dipatuan	
Maguindanao	1st	Pagras Biruar	
Maguindanao	1st	Bimbo Sinsuat	
Maguindanao	1st	Noah Ibay	
Maguindanao	2nd	Muslimin Ampatuan	
Maguindanao	2nd	Ali Bernan	
Maguindanao	2nd	Pike Mentang	
Sulu	1st	Habib Aminkadra Abubakar	
Sulu	1st	Abdulgajer Ismael	
Sulu	1st	Nabil Tan	
Sulu	2nd	Bassar Abdulrajik	
Sulu	2nd	Wilson Anni	
Sulu	2nd	Abraham Arbison	
Tawi-Tawi	Lone	George Lee	
Tawi-Tawi	Lone	Abdulcadir Ibrahim	
Tawi-Tawi	Lone	Ismael Abubakar, Jr.	

== See also ==
- Autonomous Region in Muslim Mindanao
- ARMM Regional Legislative Assembly
