= 5th ARMM Regional Legislative Assembly =

| ← | 4th Assembly | 6th Assembly | → |

Overview
- Jurisdiction: Autonomous Region in Muslim Mindanao, Philippines
- Term: 2005 – 2008
- Members: 24

The Fifth ARMM Regional Legislative Assembly was a meeting of the unicameral regional legislature of the Autonomous Region in Muslim Mindanao. The convening of the 5th Regional Legislative Assembly follows the 2005 ARMM elections, which replaced the entire membership of the Regional Legislative Assembly.

== Members ==
| Province | District | Assemblyman | Party |
|---|---|---|---|
| Basilan | Lone | Rajam M. Akbar | Lakas-CMD |
| Basilan | Lone | Bonnie Abdulaziz C. Balamo | Lakas-CMD |
| Basilan | Lone | Hatimil E. Hassan | Lakas-CMD |
| Lanao del Sur | 1st | Samer M.U. Salic | independent |
| Lanao del Sur | 1st | Suhaylah R.P.M. Salic | independent |
| Lanao del Sur | 1st | Paisalin P. Tago | Liberal |
| Lanao del Sur | 2nd | Saaduddin M. Alauya Jr. | Lakas-CMD |
| Lanao del Sur | 2nd | Yasser A. Balindong | Lakas-CMD |
| Lanao del Sur | 2nd | Hosni B.M.A. Macapodi | independent |
| Maguindanao | 1st | Jackson M. Bandila | Lakas-CMD |
| Maguindanao | 1st | Roonie W. Jahnke | Lakas-CMD |
| Maguindanao | 1st | Bongarsa D. Tomawis Jr. | Lakas-CMD |
| Maguindanao | 2nd | Umbrah A. Datumanong | Lakas-CMD |
| Maguindanao | 2nd | Khadafeh G. Mangudadatu | Lakas-CMD |
| Maguindanao | 2nd | Pike T. Mentang | Lakas-CMD |
| Sulu | 1st | Abraham T. Burahan | Liberal |
| Sulu | 1st | Alhabsi M. Hassan | Lakas-CMD |
| Sulu | 1st | Garcia D. Tingkahan | Lakas-CMD |
| Sulu | 2nd | Nashruper T. Daud | Lakas-CMD |
| Sulu | 2nd | Maulana M. Omar | Lakas-CMD |
| Sulu | 2nd | Nurwiza S. Tulawie | Lakas-CMD |
| Tawi-Tawi | Lone | Romel Y. Matba | independent |
| Tawi-Tawi | Lone | Shameera S. Matolo | Liberal |
| Tawi-Tawi | Lone | Rejie M. Sahali | Lakas-CMD |

== See also ==
- Autonomous Region in Muslim Mindanao
- ARMM Regional Legislative Assembly
