= 8th ARMM Regional Legislative Assembly =

Parliament in the Philippines

←	7th Assembly	9th Assembly	→

Overview
- Jurisdiction: Autonomous Region in Muslim Mindanao, Philippines
- Term: 2013 – 2016
- Members: 24

The Eight ARMM Regional Legislative Assembly was a meeting of the unicameral regional legislature of the Autonomous Region in Muslim Mindanao.

== Members ==
Province	District	Assemblyman	Party
Basilan	Lone	Ahmad Ali Ismael	
Basilan	Lone	Ronie Hantian	
Basilan	Lone	Haber Asarul	
Lanao del Sur	1st	Ziaur-Rahman Adiong	
Lanao del Sur	1st	Majul Gandamra	
Lanao del Sur	1st	Janimah Pandi	
Lanao del Sur	2nd	Hosni Macapodi	
Lanao del Sur	2nd	Yasser Balindong	
Lanao del Sur	2nd	Alexander B.M. Menor	
Maguindanao	1st	Roonie Sinsuat	
Maguindanao	1st	Cahar Ibay	
Maguindanao	1st	Harold Tomawis	
Maguindanao	2nd	Khadafeh Mangudadatu	
Maguindanao	2nd	Tunggal Piang	
Maguindanao	2nd	Guiadzali Midtimbang	
Sulu	1st	Rizal Tingkahan, Jr.	
Sulu	1st	Nedra Burahan	
Sulu	1st	Benhajar Tulawie	
Sulu	2nd	Khalil Hajibin	
Sulu	2nd	Mohmmad Bhydir Sarapuddin	
Sulu	2nd	Rudjia Anni	
Tawi-Tawi	Lone	Sulay Halipa	
Tawi-Tawi	Lone	Myrna Ajihil	
Tawi-Tawi	Lone	Rodolfo Bawasanta	

== See also ==
- Autonomous Region in Muslim Mindanao
- ARMM Regional Legislative Assembly
