= 7th ARMM Regional Legislative Assembly =

Parliament in the Philippines

←	6th Assembly	8th Assembly	→

Overview
- Jurisdiction: Autonomous Region in Muslim Mindanao, Philippines
- Term: 2012 – 2013
- Members: 27

The Seventh ARMM Regional Legislative Assembly was a meeting of the unicameral regional legislature of the Autonomous Region in Muslim Mindanao.

== Members ==
=== Provincial representatives ===
Province	District	Assemblyman	Party
Basilan	Lone	Rajam Akbar	
Basilan	Lone	Juni Rashied Ilimin	
Basilan	Lone	Jarah Hamja	
Lanao del Sur	1st	Ziaur-Rahman Adiong	
Lanao del Sur	1st	Majul Gandamra	
Lanao del Sur	1st	Rasol Mitmug, Jr.	
Lanao del Sur	2nd	Sittie Norhanie Lao	
Lanao del Sur	2nd	Yasser Balindong	
Lanao del Sur	2nd	Alexander B.M. Menor	
Maguindanao	1st	Suharto Ibay	
Maguindanao	1st	Arafat Kusain	
Maguindanao	1st	Romeo Sema	
Maguindanao	2nd	Khadafeh Mangudadatu	
Maguindanao	2nd	Rahima Alba	
Maguindanao	2nd	Bassir Utto	
Sulu	1st	Satrina Tulawie	
Sulu	1st	Nedra Burahan	
Sulu	1st	Mahendra Madjilon	
Sulu	2nd	Irene Tillah	
Sulu	2nd	Mohmmad Bhydir Sarapuddin	
Sulu	2nd	Abdel Anni	
Tawi-Tawi	Lone	Nurjay Sahali	
Tawi-Tawi	Lone	Dayang Carlsum Jumaide	
Tawi-Tawi	Lone	Rodolfo Bawasanta	

=== Sectoral representatives ===
Sector	Assemblyman	Party
Agriculture	Yasir Naga	
Indigenous Cultural Community	Deonato Mokudef	
Women	Samira Gutoc	

== See also ==
- Autonomous Region in Muslim Mindanao
- ARMM Regional Legislative Assembly
