= 3rd ARMM Regional Legislative Assembly =

| ← | 2nd Assembly | 4th Assembly | → |

Overview
- Jurisdiction: Autonomous Region in Muslim Mindanao, Philippines
- Term: 1996 – 2001
- Members: 21

The Third ARMM Regional Legislative Assembly was a meeting of the unicameral regional legislature of the Autonomous Region in Muslim Mindanao.

== Members ==
| Province | District | Assemblyman | Party |
|---|---|---|---|
| Lanao del Sur | 1st | Zenaida Bubong | |
| Lanao del Sur | 1st | Faysah Dumarpa | |
| Lanao del Sur | 1st | Paisalin Tago | |
| Lanao del Sur | 2nd | Abdulmalik Laguindab | |
| Lanao del Sur | 2nd | Lomala Balindong | |
| Lanao del Sur | 2nd | Benasing Macarambon, Jr. | |
| Maguindanao | 1st | Kabilan Sema | |
| Maguindanao | 1st | Bimbo Sinsuat | |
| Maguindanao | 1st | Ibrahim Ibay | |
| Maguindanao | 2nd | Abdulkarim Langkuno | |
| Maguindanao | 2nd | Mama Masukat | |
| Maguindanao | 2nd | Zaldy Ampatuan (October 1, 1996 – March 31, 1998) | |
| Sulu | 1st | Alhabsi Hassan | |
| Sulu | 1st | Garcia Tingkahan | |
| Sulu | 1st | Alvarez Isnaji | |
| Sulu | 2nd | Nazir Ynawat | |
| Sulu | 2nd | Indanan Anni | |
| Sulu | 2nd | Hussein B. Mohammad (October 1, 1996 – February 8, 1999) | |
| Sulu | 2nd | Abdulajid Estino (from February 9, 1995) | |
| Tawi-Tawi | Lone | Ruby Sahali | |
| Tawi-Tawi | Lone | Annuar Abubakar | |
| Tawi-Tawi | Lone | Ismael Hassan | |

== See also ==
- Autonomous Region in Muslim Mindanao
- ARMM Regional Legislative Assembly
