= Samira Gutoc =

Filipino civic leader (born 1974)

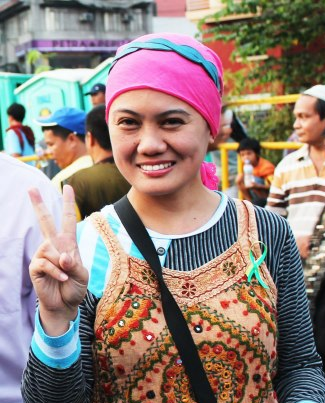
- Gutoc in 2012

Member of the Bangsamoro Transition Commission
- In office February 10, 2017 – May 29, 2017
- Appointed by: Rodrigo Duterte

Member of the ARMM Regional Legislative Assembly
- Officer in Charge
- In office May 8, 2012 – June 30, 2013
- Appointed by: Benigno Aquino III
- Sector: Women

Personal details
- Born: Samira Ali Gutoc; December 19, 1974 (age 51) Jeddah, Saudi Arabia
- Party: Aksyon Demokratiko (2021–present)
- Other political affiliations: Liberal (2018–2021)
- Spouse: Abdul Maomit Tomawis (m. 2004)
- Children: 1
- Education: University of the Philippines Diliman (AB, MIS); Arellano University (LL.B)
- Occupation: Activist; environmentalist; journalist; politician
- Website: www.samira-gutoc.com

Samira Ali Gutoc (born December 19, 1974) is a Filipina civic leader, journalist, environmentalist, women's rights advocate and politician. She served as a member of the Regional Legislative Assembly of the Autonomous Region in Muslim Mindanao and the Bangsamoro Transition Commission, which was tasked to draft the Bangsamoro Basic Law.

She is the founder of Asian Peace Alliance associated with Asia-Pacific Peace Research Association, writes for Asian Muslim Action Network, and established Ranao Rescue Team, a volunteer group that helps civilians displaced by the Battle of Marawi offering relief missions to civilians.

She resides in Marawi, belongs to the Maranao ethnic group, and is a follower of Islam. She unsuccessfully ran for the Senate in 2019, under the Otso Diretso coalition, and in 2022, under Aksyon Demokratiko.

== Early life and education ==
Samira Gutoc's father, Candidato Gutoc, was a diplomatic officer who rose through the ranks. As a result, Samira spent much of her childhood in Saudi Arabia, where her father was posted, before she went on to study at the University of the Philippines Diliman (UP Diliman) for college.

She earned her Bachelor of Arts in broadcast communication at the UP where she became the president of UP Muslim Students Association and the Metro Manila-wide Muslim Youth and Students Alliance. She then earned a Master's in International Studies from the University of the Philippines Center for International Studies, in UP Diliman, then earned a Bachelor of Laws degree from Arellano University School of Law in 2006. She acquired her Fellowship from the Oxford Center in United Kingdom.

== Career ==
=== Legislation work in Mindanao ===
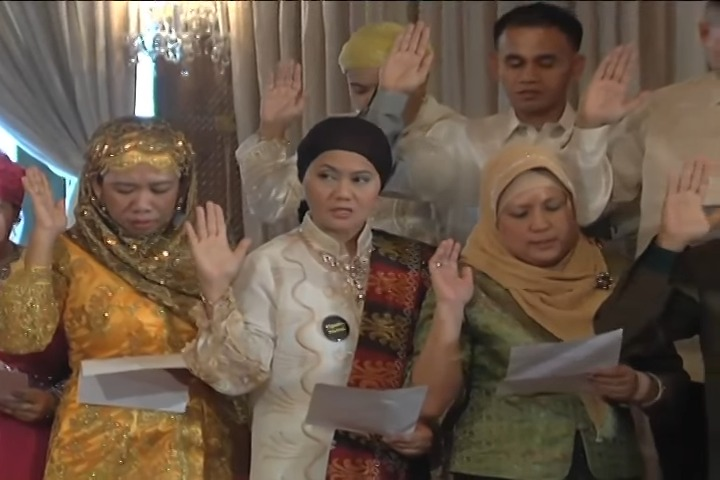
Gutoc taking her oath as OIC assemblymember of the 7th ARMM Assembly

7th ARMM Regional Legislative Assembly Gutoc was one of the 27 officer-in-charge (OIC) members of the 7th ARMM Assembly appointed by President Benigno Aquino III on May 8, 2012. The OIC officials served until the 2013 elections.

Bangsamoro Transition Commission On February 10, 2017, Gutoc was appointed by the Rodrigo Duterte administration as a member of the Bangsamoro Transition Commission tasked to draft the Bangsamoro Basic Law. However, she resigned on May 29 that year, citing her disapproval of the government's handling of the Marawi siege, the declaration of martial law, and Duterte's joke that he would take the blame for soldiers who commit rape during martial law.

=== Senate electoral campaign ===
==== 2019 election ====
On October 11, 2018, Gutoc-Tomawis announced and filed her candidacy for senator for the May 2019 election. She was a member of the political ensemble Otso Diretso, a Liberal Party-led opposition coalition against the Duterte administration. However, the whole ticket failed to secure a seat in Senate.

She signaled her agenda for peace education, divorce, Muslim rights, women's rights, and children's rights. She is against the lowering of the minimum age of criminal responsibility and has taken the position against the ongoing martial law in Mindanao.

On July 19, 2019, the PNP–Criminal Investigation and Detection Group (CIDG) filed charges against Gutoc and other members of the Otso Diretso electoral for "sedition, cyber libel, libel, estafa, harboring a criminal, and obstruction of justice". The accused including Gutoc, were alleged to be linked to "The Real Narcolist" video series of Bikoy which the PNP-CIDG said contained "false information" meant to rally people against the administration of President Rodrigo Duterte and ensure Leni Robredo's acension to the vice presidency.

==== 2022 election ====
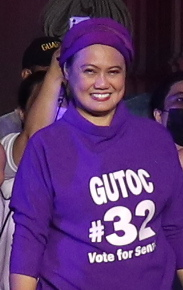
Gutoc in 2022

Gutoc-Tomawis joined Aksyon Demokratiko on August 9, 2021, and was made part of its national executive board. She was admitted to the party as a representative of Filipino Muslims, the marginalized, and women. According to Gutoc, she joined the party because she is a fan of Aksyon's founder Raul Roco and his Agenda of Hope manifesto. On October 3, she filed her candidacy for the 2022 Senate election. She was also named as a guest candidate of the Labor and Ecology Advocates for Democracy (LEAD) senatorial slate of another presidential aspirant Leody de Guzman. However, she lost once again, ranking 39th.

=== Marawi siege ===
Gutoc-Tomawis was a resident of Marawi when the 2017 Marawi siege took place. Towards highlighting the evacuees' situation, their rights and humanitarian situation, she has been a resource person to the Wall Street Journal, Washington Post, New York Times and has also appeared on Al Jazeera.

==== Organizations ====
During the 2017 Marawi siege, Gutoc-Tomawis established Ranao Rescue Team, a volunteer group that helps civilians displaced by the Battle of Marawi offering relief missions to civilians.

In 2020, she co-founded Ako Bakwit, Inc. with Nazh-Far Mariwa Berganio, an organization that aims to promote and protect the rights and welfare of the internally displaced persons in the country.

== Other affiliations ==
Gutoc-Tomawis currently writes the column "A Girl From Marawi" that comes out every Saturday on The Philippine Business and News.

She also anchors The Voice and The Voiceless at the Filipinos World in partnership with The Manila Times and Mafe Management Consultancy.

== Electoral history ==
Electoral history of Samira Gutoc
Year	Office	Party	Votes received				Result
Year	Office	Party	Total	%	P.	Swing	Result
2019	Senator of the Philippines	Liberal	4,345,252	9.19%	25th	—N/a	Lost
2022	Senator of the Philippines	Aksyon	1,834,705	3.30%	39th	-5.89	Lost

== Awards ==
- Cited as one of the World's Most Influential Muslims - The Muslim 500 by The Royal Islamic Strategic Studies Centre in the Hashemite Kingdom of Jordan.
- 2019 The Outstanding Women in Nation's Service Awardee for Peace Advocacy by TOWNs Foundation.
- 2018 United Nations Development Programme N-Peace Awardee for Activism.
- 2001 The Outstanding Youngmen (TOYM) Honoree for Youth Development by JCI Philippines.

== See also ==
- ARMM Regional Legislative Assembly
