= Hatimil Hassan =

Filipino politician

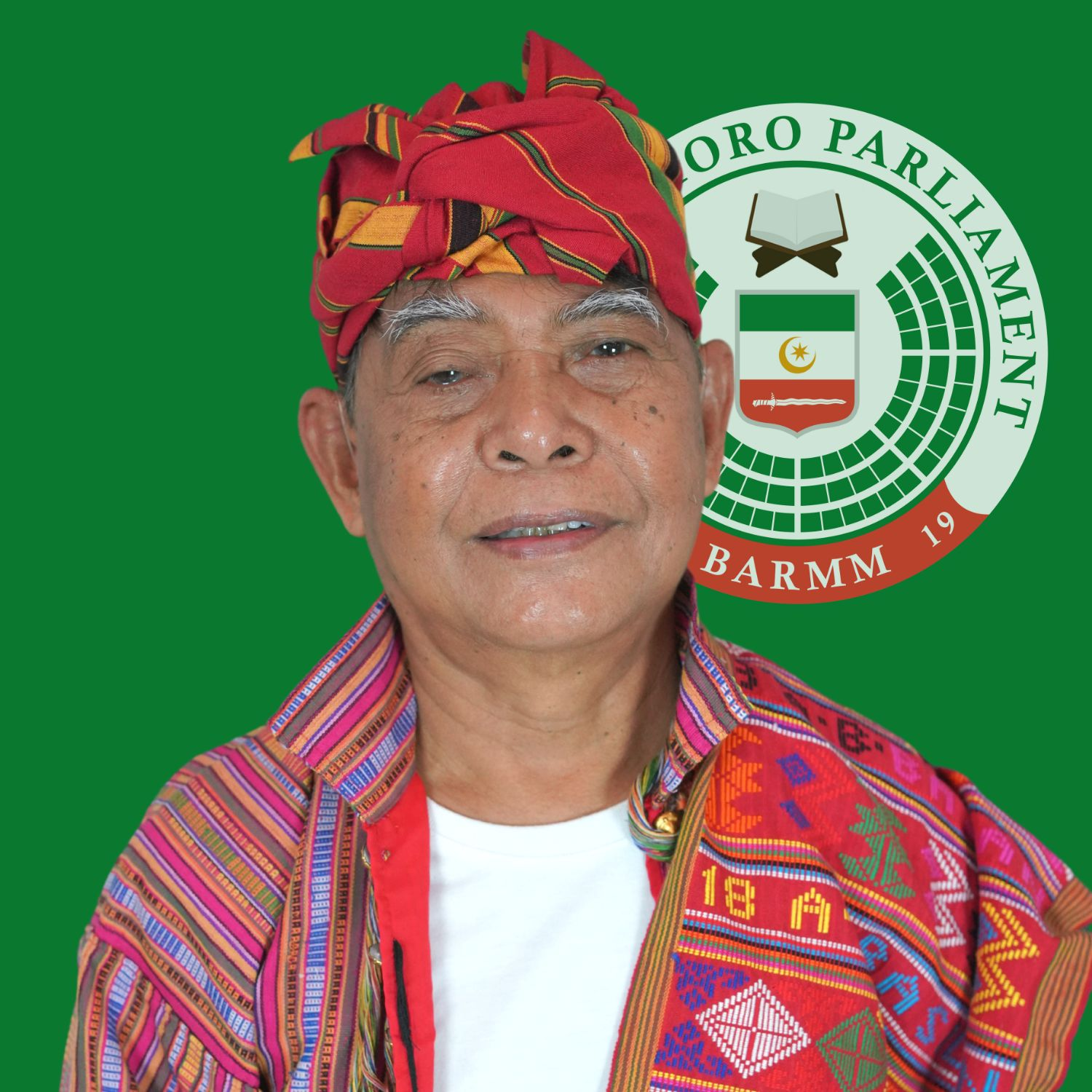
- Official portrait as MP

Deputy Chief Minister for the Island Provinces of Bangsamoro
- Incumbent
- Assumed office December 11, 2024
- Preceded by: Albakil Jikiri
- Chief Minister: Murad Ebrahim; Abdulraof Macacua

Deputy Speaker of the Bangsamoro Parliament
- In office March 29, 2019 – May 21, 2025
- Speaker: Pangalian Balindong
- Preceded by: Office established

Member of the Bangsamoro Transition Authority Parliament
- Incumbent
- Assumed office March 29, 2019
- Nominated by: Philippine national government
- Appointed by: Rodrigo Duterte; Bongbong Marcos

Speaker of the ARMM Regional Legislative Assembly
- In office April 28, 2004 – May 8, 2006
- Preceded by: Ismael Abubakar Jr.
- Succeeded by: Paisalin Tago

Member of the ARMM Regional Legislative Assembly for Basilan
- In office 2001–2008 Serving with Rajam Akbar (2001–2008); Harisul Samanul (2001–2005); Bonnie Abdulaziz Balamo (2005–2008)

Personal details
- Born: Hatimil Esmail Hassan; May 21, 1949 (age 77) Basilan
- Party: Lakas–CMD; Bangsamoro Party
- Military career
- Allegiance: MNLF

Hatimil Esmail Hassan (born 1949) is a Filipino politician and Bangsamoro revolutionary who served as Vice-Chairman of the Central Committee of the MNLF under Nur Misuari from September 1980 to April 2001, currently serving as a member of the Bangsamoro Parliament since 2019 and the Deputy Chief Minister of Bangsamoro for the Islands since 2024. He previously served as one of the deputy speakers of the Parliament. He also previously served as a member of the ARMM Regional Legislative Assembly where he was elected speaker, serving from 2004 to 2006.

== Career ==
Hassan is a notable member of the MNLF Executive Council of 15, a faction of the Moro National Liberation Front (MNLF) who forged a unity agreement with the Moro Islamic Liberation Front (MILF). He is the currently the vice-chairman for External Affairs of the MNLF Central Committee.

Hassan was elected to the ARMM Regional Legislative Assembly as a member representing Basilan in 2001, and re-elected in 2005. In the 4th Assembly, he was elected as the chamber's speaker on April 28, 2004.

He was appointed as a commissioner of the National Commission on Muslim Filipinos from 2010 to 2012.

Hassan was one of the commissioners of the Bangsamoro Transition Commission under the administration of President Rodrigo Duterte.

In 2019, he was nominated by the Philippine national government to serve as a member of the Bangsamoro Parliament. He was thereafter appointed to the body by President Duterte, and was elected as deputy speaker during the first interim Parliament's inaugural session. He was reappointed to the Parliament in 2025 by President Bongbong Marcos.

Hassan succeeded Albakil Jikiri as the Deputy Chief Minister of Bangsamoro for the Islands on December 11, 2024.
