= Regie Sahali-Generale =

Filipino politician

Reggie Sahali-Generale

Vice Governor of the Autonomous Region in Muslim Mindanao
- In office July 6, 2010 – December 22, 2011
- Governor: Ansaruddin Alonto Adiong
- Preceded by: Zaldy Ampatuan
- Succeeded by: Haroun Al-Rashid Lucman II

Personal details
- Born: Philippines

Reggie Sahali-Generale is a Filipino politician and former vice governor of the Autonomous Region in Muslim Mindanao (ARMM). In 2010, she was the first woman to serve in this position.

== Family ==
Her father, Sadikul A. Sahali, was a two-term Governor of Tawi-Tawi. Her mother, Juana Maquiso Sahali, was a principal of Batu-Batu National High School in Panglima Sugala, Tawi-Tawi. Her three surviving siblings all have positions in government: Hadja Ruby Sahali-Tan served as the regional secretary of the Department of Social Welfare and Development (DSWD)-ARMM; Nurbert Sahali is mayor of Panglima Sugala, Tawi-Tawi; and Nurjay M. Sahali was secretary to the Governor.
