= Master of International Studies =

The Master of International Studies (MIS) or Master of Arts in International Studies (MAIS) is an academic postgraduate degree that prepares students for careers in diplomacy, government service, inter-governmental organizations (IGOs), and non-governmental organizations (NGOs). It can also help prepare graduate students for working for multinational corporations (MNCs). These programs are designed to address the growing complexities of the international system, through interdisciplinary study.

Graduates of the MIS should be equipped with the skills to analyze and assess theoretical and thematic approaches to international studies in relation to issues of governance and conflict, globalization, migration and media, regional imperatives and priorities, and cultures and societies.

Universities around the world that offer the MIS include American University/Washington, D.C., the North Carolina State University, Stellenbosch University, Seoul National University (Graduate School of International Studies), the University of Queensland, the University of Sydney, the University of Otago, the George Washington University, Bjørknes College, the University of South Australia, the University of the Philippines Diliman, International Pacific College and the University of Melbourne, among others. Other institutions that have historically offered include the Claremont Graduate University.
