= Ismael Abubakar Jr. =

Filipino politician (1949–2017)

The Honorable Ismael "Pochong" Abubakar Jr.
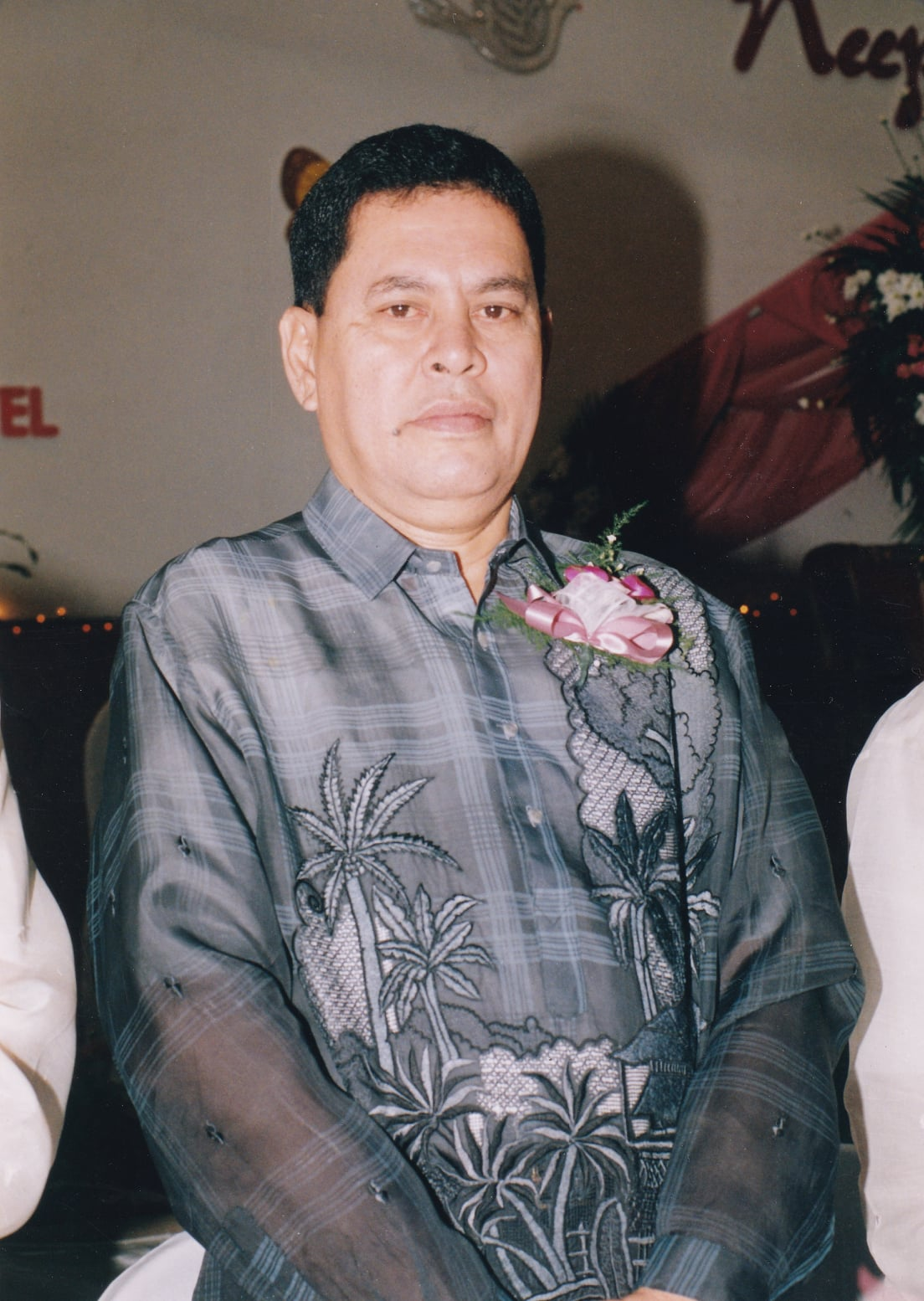
- Abubakar during a public appearance

7th Speaker of the ARMM Regional Legislative Assembly
- In office May 2003 – August 2003

1st Speaker of the ARMM Regional Legislative Assembly
- In office June 30, 1990 – 1993

Vice Governor of Tawi-Tawi
- In office 1988–1990

Personal details
- Born: Ismael Abubakar Jr. April 17, 1949 Jolo, Sulu
- Died: June 6, 2017 (aged 68) Zamboanga City, Philippines
- Party: UNA (2013)
- Other political affiliations: Lakas-CMD; Liberal Party (Philippines)

Ismael "Pochong" Abubakar Jr. (April 17, 1949 – June 6, 2017) was a Filipino politician who served as the first speaker of the Regional Legislative Assembly of the Autonomous Region in Muslim Mindanao. In 1988 he served as the Vice Governor of Tawi-Tawi, and in 1990 was elected to the ARMM Regional Legislative Assembly, where he served as its first speaker.

== Early life and family ==
Ismael Abubakar Jr., also known as Pochong, was born on April 17, 1949 in Jolo, Sulu. A member of the Abubakar and Bederi families, Abubakar comes from the Sama-Bajau and Tausug tribes and was born into an already prominent political family in the southern Philippines. His great-grandfather was Senator Hadji Butu Rasul, the first Muslim senator in the Philippine Senate, and his uncle, Yusuf R. Abubakar, was the Ambassador of the Philippines to Malaysia, Ceylon (now Sri Lanka), and Singapore, and was a member of the Philippine Constitutional Commission of 1986. His other uncle, Benjamin R. Abubakar, was the Governor of Sulu and was a member of the Philippine Constitutional Convention of 1971, representing Sulu.

Moreover, through his father, whose mother was a Rasul, Abubakar is also the nephew of Ambassador Abraham Rasul, the Philippine Ambassador to Saudi Arabia. Ambassador Rasul is the son of former Senator Hadji Butu Rasul and former Senator Santanina Rasul, the first Muslim woman senator.

== Career ==
Abubakar was selected to serve as the Vice Governor of the Tawi-Tawi province in 1988, despite being a member of the opposition party.

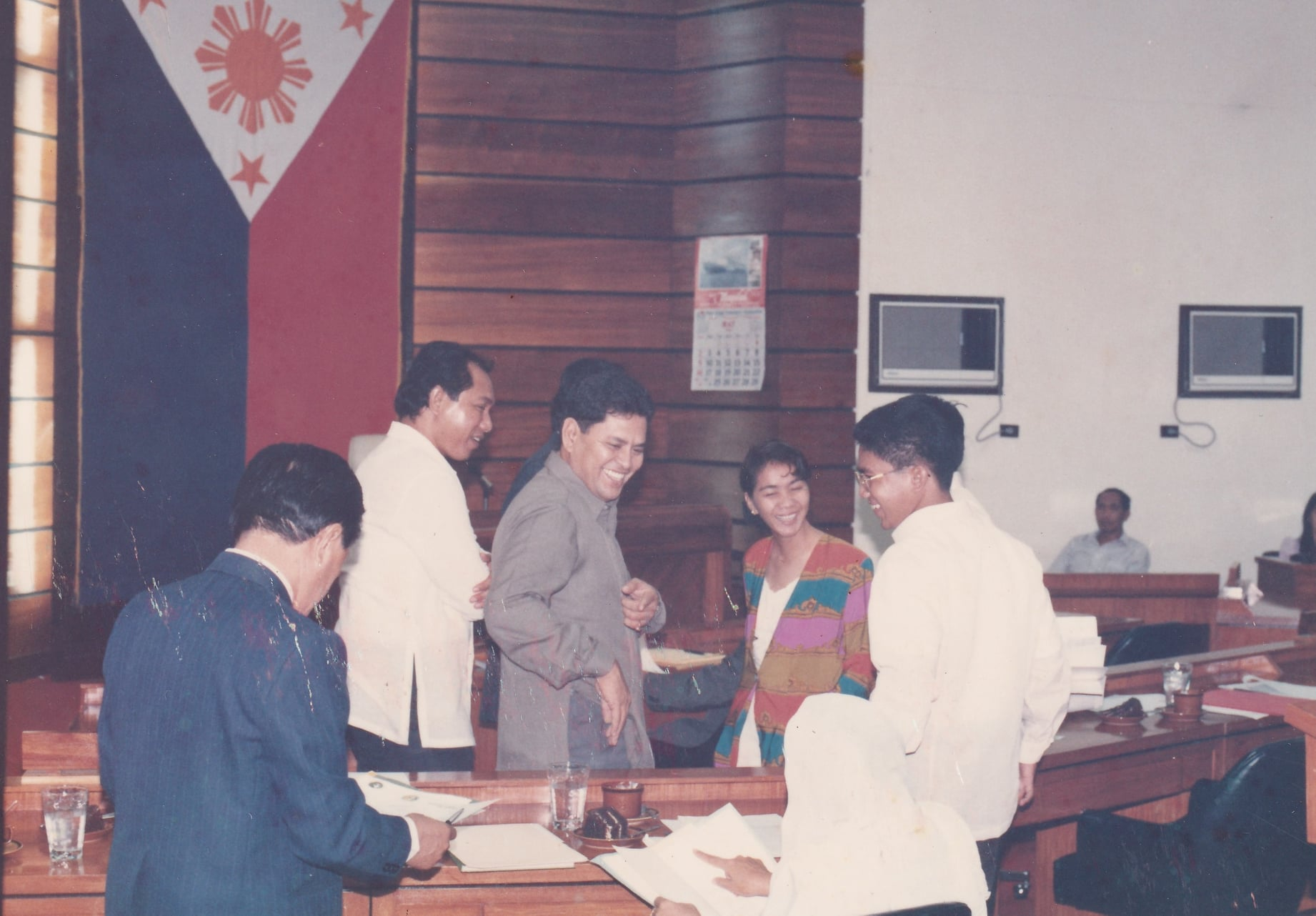
Ismael Abubakar Jr. in an ARMM session

In 1990, he was elected to a seat in the ARMM Regional Legislative Assembly, and became that body's first speaker. In May 2003 Abubakar was elected as speaker of the Regional Legislative Assembly, but was prevented by a court order from exercising the functions of that office because Ibrahim Ibay also claimed that position, and the two had effectively been acting as speaker at the same time. In August 2003 he was again elected speaker of the Regional Legislative Assembly, making him its third speaker in 14 months. Abubakar also served as the first president of the Tawi-Tawo Chamber of Commerce Inc. In 2023, a posthumous award was given to Abubakar for his contributions to the chamber. The award was accepted by his family. In 2009, he was included in The 500 Most Influential Muslims list. His description on the list stated, “Abubakar is the former speaker of the Autonomous Region in Muslim Mindanao's regional legislative assembly. He is now concentrating on business and interfaith dialogue, convening the Philippine Council for Islam and Democracy. He is from the predominantly Muslim Sama tribe, which garners him a significant amount of respect in dealing with the Muslim militants.”

== Outside of Politics ==
When the international luxury brand Jewelmer was newly established, Ismael Abubakar Jr. played a crucial role in helping its founders harvest pearls in the Sulu region. Jacques Branellec, in his book The Ultimate Orient: The Quest for the Perfect Pearl, recounted, “I continued my search in the Sulu Islands with the help of Pochong Abubakar, a respected Muslim and friend of Manuel [Cojuangco].” Abubakar was instrumental in Jewelmer’s establishment, providing security and guidance in a region considered risky at the time.

Abubakar entered the seaweed industry in the 1980s by establishing IA International Business. The company caters to clients in Europe, North America, and Asia, supplying premium-quality seaweed sourced from the waters of Mindanao. Moreover, he was elected Chairman of the Board of the Seaweeds Industry Association of the Philippines in 2000 and held the position until 2010. For 10 years, Abubakar was the Muslim Coordinator for the Inter Faith Council of Leaders and was a member of the Silsilah Dialogue Movement, a group formed by a priest in Zamboanga City. He also served as a convener for the Philippine Center for Islam and Democracy.
