= Legislative districts of Sulu =

Legislative District of the Philippines

The legislative districts of Sulu are the representations of the province of Sulu in the various national legislatures of the Philippines. The province is currently represented in the lower house of the Congress of the Philippines through its first and second congressional districts.

== History ==
Initially being excluded from representation in the lower house of the Philippine Legislature in 1907, the then-non-Christian-majority areas of the Philippines — which included the Department of Mindanao and Sulu, of which Sulu (including what is now Tawi-Tawi) was part — were finally extended legislative representation with the passage of the Philippine Autonomy Act in 1916 by the United States Congress. The Revised Administrative Code (Act No. 2711) enacted on March 10, 1917, further elaborated on the manner by which these areas would be represented. The non-Christian areas were to be collectively represented in the upper house's 12th senatorial district by two senators, both appointed by the Governor-General. Five assembly members, also appointed by the Governor-General, were to represent the seven component provinces of Department of Mindanao and Sulu — Agusan, Bukidnon, Cotabato, Davao, Lanao, Sulu and Zamboanga — in the lower house as a single at-large district.

These arrangements remained in place despite the abolition of the Department in 1920. It lasted until 1935, when each of the seven provinces was provided a single representative to the National Assembly of the Philippines, albeit the manner of election varying between provinces. Voters of the more Christianized provinces of Agusan, Bukidnon, Davao and Zamboanga could elect their representative through popular vote by virtue of Article VI, Section 1 of the 1935 Constitution. In the Muslim-dominated provinces of Cotabato, Lanao and Sulu, however, voter qualifications were more restrictive: the only persons allowed to vote for the province's representative were past and present municipal officials (municipal president, vice-president, municipal councilors); present senators, assembly representatives and 1935 Constitutional Convention delegates; provincial governors and members of provincial boards; and any persons currently residing in the concerned province who held any of the aforementioned positions in the past. This was the manner by which Sulu's representative was elected in 1935.

The 1st National Assembly of the Philippines passed Commonwealth Act No. 44 on October 13, 1936, to finally give all qualified voters of Sulu (along with Cotabato and Lanao) the right to elect their own representatives through popular vote. Voters began to elect their representatives in this manner beginning in 1938.

In the disruption caused by the Second World War, the Province of Sulu sent two delegates to the National Assembly of the Japanese-sponsored Second Philippine Republic: one was the provincial governor (an ex officio member), while the other was elected through a provincial assembly of KALIBAPI members during the Japanese occupation of the Philippines. Upon the restoration of the Philippine Commonwealth in 1945 the province retained its pre-war lone congressional district.

Sulu (excluding Tawi-Tawi, which became a separate province in 1973) was represented in the Interim Batasang Pambansa as part of Region IX from 1978 to 1984. The province returned one representative, elected at large, to the Regular Batasang Pambansa in 1984.

Under the new Constitution which was proclaimed on February 11, 1987, the province was reapportioned into two congressional districts; each elected its member to the restored House of Representatives starting that same year.

Tawi-Tawi last formed part of its representation in 1972.

== Current districts ==
Sulu's current congressional delegation is composed of two members.

Lakas–CMD (2)

Legislative districts and representatives of Sulu
District	Current Representative		Party	Constituent LGUs	Population (2020)	Area	Map					
District	Image		Party	Constituent LGUs	Population (2020)	Area	Map					
District	1st		Party	Constituent LGUs	Population (2020)	Area	Map	Samier Tan (since 2022); Maimbung	Lakas–CMD	List: Hadji Panglima Tahil (Marunggas); Indanan; Jolo; Maimbung; Pangutaran; Parang; Patikul; Talipao	585,458	1101.53 km²
2nd		Abdulmunir M. Arbison (since 2025); Luuk	Lakas–CMD	List: Banguingui; Kalingalan Caluang; Lugus; Luuk; Old Panamao; Omar; Pandami; Panglima Estino; Pata; Siasi; Tapul	414,650	989.17 km²						

== Historical Districts ==
=== Lone District (defunct) ===
- includes the present-day province of Tawi-Tawi

Period	Representative
1st National Assembly; 1935–1938	Ombra Amilbangsa
2nd National Assembly; 1938–1941	Gulamu Rasul
1st Commonwealth Congress; 1945	Ombra Amilbangsa
1st Congress; 1946–1949	Ombra Amilbangsa
2nd Congress; 1949–1953	Gulamu Rasul (Note: Unseated in 1950 after losing election protest to Ombra Amilbangsa.)
2nd Congress; 1949–1953	Ombra Amilbangsa (Note: Replaced Gulamu Rasul after winning election protest in 1950.)
3rd Congress; 1953–1957	Ombra Amilbangsa
4th Congress; 1957–1961	Ombra Amilbangsa
5th Congress; 1961–1965	Salih Ututalum (Note: Unseated in 1969 after losing election protest to Indanan Anni.)
6th Congress; 1965–1969	Salih Ututalum
6th Congress; 1965–1969	Indanan Anni (Note: Took oath of office on April 23, 1969 after winning election protest against Salih Ututalum.)
7th Congress; 1969–1972	Indanan Anni

=== At-Large (defunct) ===
==== 1943–1944 ====
- includes the present-day province of Tawi-Tawi

Period	Representatives
National Assembly; 1943–1944	Gulamu Rasul
National Assembly; 1943–1944	Ombra Amilbangsa (ex officio)

==== 1984–1986 ====
Period	Representative
Regular Batasang Pambansa; 1984–1986	Hussin T. Loong

== See also ==
- Legislative districts of Mindanao and Sulu
- Legislative district of Tawi-Tawi
