= Legislative districts of Tawi-Tawi =

District in the Philippines

The legislative district of Tawi-Tawi is the representation of the province of Tawi-Tawi in the various national legislatures of the Philippines. The province is currently represented in the lower house of the Congress of the Philippines through its lone congressional district.

== History ==
Prior to gaining separate representation, areas now under the jurisdiction of Tawi-Tawi were represented under the Department of Mindanao and Sulu (1917–1935), Sulu (1935–1972) and Region IX (1978–1984).

The enactment of Presidential Decree No. 302 on September 11, 1973 created the Province of Tawi-Tawi out of Sulu's western and southern municipalities. The new province was represented in the Interim Batasang Pambansa as part of Region IX from 1978 to 1984.

Tawi-Tawi first gained separate representation in 1984 when it returned one representative, elected at large, to the Regular Batasang Pambansa.

Under the new Constitution which was proclaimed on February 11, 1987, the province constituted a lone congressional district, and elected its member to the restored House of Representatives starting that same year.

== Lone District ==
- Population (2015): 390,715

| Period | Representative |
|---|---|
| 8th Congress; 1987–1992 | Alawadin T. Bandon, Jr. (Note: Unseated after losing election protest to Romulo M. Espaldon on December 12, 1990.) (de facto) |
| 8th Congress; 1987–1992 | Romulo Espaldon (Note: Replaced Alawadin T. Bandon, Jr. after winning election protest on December 12, 1990.) |
| 9th Congress; 1992–1995 | Nur G. Jaafar |
| 10th Congress; 1995–1998 | Nur G. Jaafar |
| 11th Congress; 1998–2001 | Nur G. Jaafar |
| 12th Congress; 2001–2004 | Soraya C. Jaafar |
| 13th Congress; 2004–2007 | Anuar J. Abubakar (Note: Initially proclaimed winner in May 2004 election; unseated after victory proclamation annulled by the House of Representatives Electoral Tribunal (HRET) on June 30, 2006. Motion for Reconsideration denied August 3, 2006.) (de facto) |
| 13th Congress; 2004–2007 | Nur G. Jaafar (Note: Replaced Anuar Abubakar after being declared duly elected winner of May 2004 election by the House of Representatives Electoral Tribunal on June 30, 2006.) |
| 14th Congress; 2007–2010 | Nur G. Jaafar |
| 15th Congress; 2010–2013 | Nur G. Jaafar |
| 16th Congress; 2013–2016 | Ruby M. Sahali-Tan |
| 17th Congress; 2016–2019 | Ruby M. Sahali-Tan |
| 18th Congress; 2019–2022 | Rashidin H. Matba |
| 19th Congress; 2022–2025 | Dimszar M. Sali |
| 20th Congress; 2025–2028 | Dimszar M. Sali |

== At-Large (defunct) ==
| Period | Representative |
|---|---|
| Regular Batasang Pambansa; 1984–1986 | Celso J. Palma |

== See also ==
- Legislative district of Mindanao and Sulu
- Legislative districts of Sulu
