= ARMM Regional Legislative Assembly =

Devolved Filipino regional legislature

ARMM Regional Assembly المجلس التشريعي الإقليمي Pangrehiyong Kapulungang Pambatasan ng ARMM

Type
- Type: Unicameral
- Term limits: 3 terms (9 years)

History
- Founded: February 12, 1990
- Disbanded: February 26, 2019
- Succeeded by: Bangsamoro Parliament

Leadership
- Speaker: Ronnie Q. Sinsuat (last)

Structure
- Seats: 24
- Length of term: 3 years
- Authority: Article VII, Republic Act No. 6734

Elections
- Voting system: Plurality-at-large voting
- First election: February 12, 1990
- Last election: May 9, 2016

Meeting place
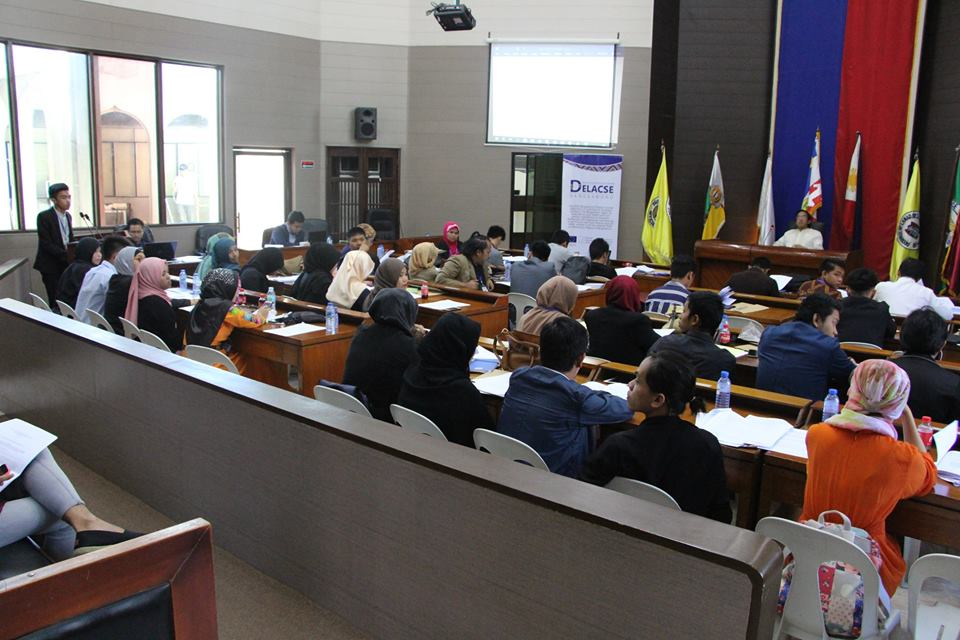
- Regional Legislative Assembly Building, ARMM Complex, Rosary Heights VII, Cotabato City

Website
- rla.armm.gov.ph

The ARMM Regional Assembly, also known as the ARMM Regional Legislative Assembly (Filipino: Pangrehiyong Kapulungang Pambatasan ng ARMM), was the unicameral regional legislature of the Autonomous Region in Muslim Mindanao (ARMM), a former autonomous region of the Philippines. It was also known as the "Little Congress" of the ARMM.

It was succeeded by the Bangsamoro Parliament upon the establishment of Bangsamoro in 2019.

== History ==
The regional assembly was established under Republic Act No. 6734, otherwise known as the Organic Act for the Autonomous Region in Muslim Mindanao. Its powers and limitations were defined in Article VII of the Act. The first ARMM Regional Assembly was elected on February 12, 1990, to serve a three-year term beginning on June 30, 1990. Its first speaker was Ismael Abubakar Jr..

Elections to the regional assembly were held separately from the Philippine general elections from 1990 to 2008. Following the passage of legislation synchronizing ARMM elections with the 2013 Philippine general election, President Benigno Aquino III appointed officers-in-charge to serve until the elections held on May 13, 2013.

== Composition ==
Unlike provincial boards, where the vice governor serves as the presiding officer, the ARMM Regional Legislative Assembly was headed by a speaker, who was the third-highest official of the ARMM government. The assembly consisted of 24 members, with three elected from each congressional district: six from Lanao del Sur (including Marawi), six from Maguindanao, six from Sulu, three from Basilan, and three from Tawi-Tawi.

Regular members and sectoral representatives served three-year terms and were limited to a maximum of three consecutive terms.

The assembly exercised legislative authority over matters devolved to the autonomous region under the organic act. Matters reserved to the national government included foreign affairs, national defense and security, postal services, coinage and fiscal and monetary policy, the administration of justice, quarantine, customs and tariffs, citizenship, naturalization, immigration and deportation, general auditing, national elections, maritime, land and air transportation, communications, patents, trademarks, trade names, copyrights, and foreign trade. It could also legislate on matters covered by Sharia, the body of Islamic law governing Muslims.
