= Governor of the Autonomous Region in Muslim Mindanao =

Head of a Muslim region of the Philippines

- Punong Panrehiyon ng Rehiyong Awtonomo sa Muslim Mindanao
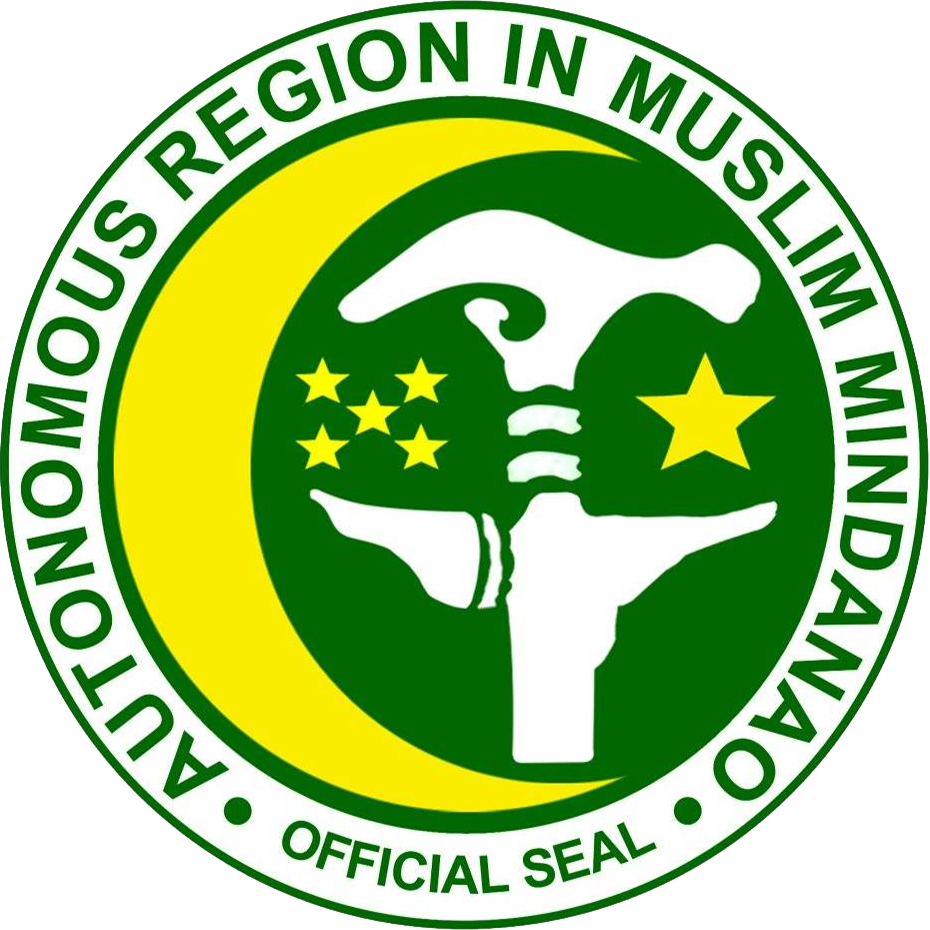
- Seal of the ARMM
- Style: The Honorable
- Member of: Cabinet
- Reports to: The President
- Seat: Office of the Bangsamoro People
- Appointer: President of the Philippines; with the Congress of the Philippines
- Term length: 3 years
- Constituting instrument: Organic Act of 1976
- Formation: 1990
- First holder: Zacaria Candao
- Final holder: Mujiv Hataman
- Abolished: 2019
- Superseded by: Chief Minister of Bangsamoro
- Deputy: Vice Regional Governor; Three Deputy Regional Governors
- Salary: Salary Grade 31; equivalent to ₱141,000
- Website: www.armm.gov.ph

The governor of the Autonomous Region in Muslim Mindanao was the executive head of the Autonomous Region in Muslim Mindanao (ARMM) in the Philippines. The position was also simply referred to as the regional governor (punong pangrehiyon) as a distinction to provincial governors.

The following is a list of holders of the position.

== List of governors ==
No.	Portrait	Name (Lifespan)	Term start	Term end	Term length	Party	Election	Vice Governor
1		Zacaria Candao	July 6, 1990	April 2, 1993	2 years, 270 days	Lakas	1990	Benjamin Loong
2		Lininding Pangandaman (died 2013)	April 2, 1993	September 30, 1996	3 years, 181 days	Lakas	1993	Nabil Tan
3		Nur Misuari (born 1939)	September 30, 1996	November 20, 2001	5 years, 51 days	Lakas	1996	Guimid Matalam
—		Alvarez Isnaji (born 1946); Acting	November 20, 2001	December 27, 2001	37 days	PDP–Laban	—	Vacant
4		Parouk Hussin	December 27, 2001	September 30, 2005	3 years, 277 days	Lakas	2001	Mahid Mutilan
5		Zaldy Ampatuan (born 1967)	September 30, 2005	December 11, 2009	4 years, 72 days	Lakas	2005	Ansaruddin Alonto Adiong
5		Zaldy Ampatuan (born 1967)	September 30, 2005	December 11, 2009	4 years, 72 days	Lakas	2008	Ansaruddin Alonto Adiong
—		Ansaruddin Alonto Adiong (born 1969); Acting	December 11, 2009	December 22, 2011	2 years, 11 days	Lakas	—	Vacant (until 2010)
—		Ansaruddin Alonto Adiong (born 1969); Acting	December 11, 2009	December 22, 2011	2 years, 11 days	Lakas	—	Reggie Sahali-Generale (from 2010)
—		Mujiv Hataman (Note: Mujiv Hataman served as acting governor from December 22, 2011, until June 20, 2013.) (born 1972)	December 22, 2011	June 30, 2013	1 year, 190 days	Liberal	—	Vacant (until 2013)
6		Mujiv Hataman (born 1972)	June 30, 2013	February 26, 2019	5 years, 241 days	Liberal	2013	Haroun Al-Rashid Lucman II (from 2013)
6		Mujiv Hataman (born 1972)	June 30, 2013	February 26, 2019	5 years, 241 days	Liberal	2016	Haroun Al-Rashid Lucman II (from 2013)
