= 1993 Autonomous Region in Muslim Mindanao general election =

General elections are held in the Autonomous Region in Muslim Mindanao for the posts of Regional Governor and Vice-Governor on March 25, 1993. The Lakas-NUCD-UMDP party won a majority of the positions during the election.

== Electoral system ==
=== Regional governor and vice governor ===
The election is regionwide, under the first-past-the-post system. The candidate with the highest number of votes is elected.

=== Regional assembly ===
Each province is divided into two districts, each electing three members via multiple non-transferable vote.

== Results ==
=== Regional Governor ===
Candidate	Party	Votes	%
Lininding Pangandaman	Lakas–NUCD/United Muslim Democrats of the Philippines	602,573	71.74
Zacaria Candao (incumbent)	Islamic Party of the Philippines–Laban ng Demokratikong Pilipino	236,339	28.14
Hadji Idijirani	Muslim Democratic Party	1,049	0.12
Total		839,961	100.00
Total votes		848,982	–
Registered voters/turnout		1,030,460	82.39
Lakas–NUCD–UMDP gain from Islamic Party of the Philippines–Laban ng Demokratikong Pilipino			
Source: Commission on Elections

=== Regional Vice-Governor ===
Candidate	Party	Votes	%
Nabil Tan	Lakas–NUCD/United Muslim Democrats of the Philippines	442,798	54.67
Benjamin Loong (incumbent)	Laban ng Demokratikong Pilipino	367,141	45.33
Total		809,939	100.00
Total votes		848,982	–
Registered voters/turnout		1,030,460	82.39
Lakas–NUCD–UMDP gain from Laban ng Demokratikong Pilipino			
Source: Commission on Elections

=== Regional Legislative Assembly ===
Party	Votes	%	Seats
Lakas–NUCD/United Muslim Democrats of the Philippines	799,435	33.92	8
Islamic Party of the Philippines–Laban ng Demokratikong Pilipino	564,661	23.96	4
Laban ng Demokratikong Pilipino	318,778	13.53	1
Lakas–NUCD/United Muslim Democrats of the Philippines–Ompia Party	193,512	8.21	2
Nationalist People's Coalition–Lakas–NUCD/United Muslim Democrats of the Philippines	92,245	3.91	1
Islamic Party of the Philippines	86,498	3.67	1
Nationalist People's Coalition	67,152	2.85	1
PDP–Laban	53,682	2.28	1
Lakas–NUCD/Ompia Party	25,878	1.10	0
National Union of Christian Democrats	67	0.00	0
Independent	154,966	6.58	2
Total	2,356,874	100.00	21
Total votes	848,982	–	
Registered voters/turnout	1,030,460	82.39	
Source: Commission on Elections

==== Lanao del Sur's 1st district ====
Candidate	Party	Votes	%
Princess Johayra Pangarungan (incumbent)	Laban ng Demokratikong Pilipino	63,256	15.87
Hadja Faysah Dumarpa	PDP–Laban	53,682	13.47
Mangurun Batuampar	Independent	45,385	11.39
Acmad Tomawis (incumbent)	Laban ng Demokratikong Pilipino	38,450	9.65
Bai Normallah Pacasum	Lakas–NUCD/United Muslim Democrats of the Philippines	36,664	9.20
Blo Adiong	Nationalist People's Coalition	34,943	8.77
Guiling Mamondiong	Lakas–NUCD/United Muslim Democrats of the Philippines–Ompia Party	30,108	7.55
Hatta Dimaporo	Independent	26,768	6.72
Abdulazis Mamutuk	Lakas–NUCD/Ompia Party	25,878	6.49
Datu Padilla Adiong Pundaodaya (incumbent)	Lakas–NUCD/United Muslim Democrats of the Philippines	25,180	6.32
Ismael Tago Ali	Islamic Party of the Philippines–Laban ng Demokratikong Pilipino	18,020	4.52
Noranida Macalawi	Lakas–NUCD/United Muslim Democrats of the Philippines–Ompia Party	72	0.02
Jamairy Domado	Lakas–NUCD/United Muslim Democrats of the Philippines–Ompia Party	57	0.01
Hadji Abdul Rashid Manggay Guro	Lakas–NUCD/United Muslim Democrats of the Philippines–Ompia Party	33	0.01
Curran Macapundag	Lakas–NUCD/United Muslim Democrats of the Philippines–Ompia Party	26	0.01
Total		398,522	100.00
Total votes		134,247	–
Registered voters/turnout		149,084	90.05
Source: Commission on Elections

==== Lanao del Sur's 2nd district ====
Candidate	Party	Votes	%
Jamil Lucman	Lakas–NUCD/United Muslim Democrats of the Philippines–Ompia Party	74,013	21.22
Pangalian Balindong (incumbent)	Islamic Party of the Philippines–Laban ng Demokratikong Pilipino	59,562	17.07
Benasing Macarambon Jr.	Lakas–NUCD/United Muslim Democrats of the Philippines–Ompia Party	58,317	16.72
Akilali Balt	Laban ng Demokratikong Pilipino	53,298	15.28
Ismael Camid (incumbent)	Nationalist People's Coalition–Lakas–NUCD/United Muslim Democrats of the Philippines	52,692	15.10
Tolawidan Dimaporo	Lakas–NUCD/United Muslim Democrats of the Philippines–Ompia Party	30,765	8.82
Hadji Arip Minandang Balt	Independent	20,091	5.76
Ali Balindong	Lakas–NUCD/United Muslim Democrats of the Philippines–Ompia Party	121	0.03
Total		348,859	100.00
Total votes		132,101	–
Registered voters/turnout		148,337	89.05
Source: Commission on Elections

==== Maguindanao's 1st district ====
Candidate	Party	Votes	%
Ibrahim Ibay	Islamic Party of the Philippines	40,237	13.93
Datu Bimbo Sinsuat (incumbent)	Nationalist People's Coalition–Lakas–NUCD/United Muslim Democrats of the Philippines	39,553	13.69
Bongarsa Tomawis	Lakas–NUCD/United Muslim Democrats of the Philippines	31,315	10.84
Pagras Biruar (incumbent)	Lakas–NUCD/United Muslim Democrats of the Philippines	29,993	10.38
Tahir Lidasan	Lakas–NUCD/United Muslim Democrats of the Philippines	27,431	9.50
Datu Casim Bailan	Islamic Party of the Philippines	25,889	8.96
Malamama Macapeges	Islamic Party of the Philippines–Laban ng Demokratikong Pilipino	24,757	8.57
Salindatu Druz Ali	Islamic Party of the Philippines–Laban ng Demokratikong Pilipino	21,776	7.54
Pasandalan Ambolodto	Islamic Party of the Philippines–Laban ng Demokratikong Pilipino	16,979	5.88
Alonto Daudie	Islamic Party of the Philippines–Laban ng Demokratikong Pilipino	16,300	5.64
Kuder Biruar	Lakas–NUCD/United Muslim Democrats of the Philippines	14,659	5.07
Total		288,889	100.00
Total votes		111,978	–
Registered voters/turnout		157,066	71.29
Source: Commission on Elections

==== Maguindanao's 2nd district ====
Candidate	Party	Votes	%
Zaldy Ampatuan	Lakas–NUCD/United Muslim Democrats of the Philippines	93,159	20.35
Guimid Matalam	Lakas–NUCD/United Muslim Democrats of the Philippines	77,323	16.89
Ali Bernan (incumbent)	Lakas–NUCD/United Muslim Democrats of the Philippines	57,371	12.53
Datu Pike Mentang (incumbent)	Islamic Party of the Philippines–Laban ng Demokratikong Pilipino	55,212	12.06
Muslimin Ampatuan (incumbent)	Islamic Party of the Philippines–Laban ng Demokratikong Pilipino	49,194	10.75
Mama Masukat	Islamic Party of the Philippines–Laban ng Demokratikong Pilipino	47,575	10.39
Umbrah Datumanong	Lakas–NUCD/United Muslim Democrats of the Philippines	40,232	8.79
Datu Conte Mangelen	Lakas–NUCD/United Muslim Democrats of the Philippines	37,225	8.13
Datumama Mapandala	Lakas–NUCD/United Muslim Democrats of the Philippines	453	0.10
Total		457,744	100.00
Total votes		164,070	–
Registered voters/turnout		196,077	83.68
Source: Commission on Elections

==== Sulu's 1st district ====
Candidate	Party	Votes	%
Benezer Tulawie	Islamic Party of the Philippines–Laban ng Demokratikong Pilipino	73,390	25.10
Abdulgager Ismael (incumbent)	Islamic Party of the Philippines–Laban ng Demokratikong Pilipino	69,867	23.89
Abdurajik Maldisa	Islamic Party of the Philippines–Laban ng Demokratikong Pilipino	62,371	21.33
Aminkadra Abubakar (incumbent)	Lakas–NUCD/United Muslim Democrats of the Philippines	29,939	10.24
Edsir Tan	Lakas–NUCD/United Muslim Democrats of the Philippines	28,283	9.67
Nur Hussein Ututalum	Lakas–NUCD/United Muslim Democrats of the Philippines	28,165	9.63
Sakib Janani	Independent	390	0.13
Total		292,405	100.00
Total votes		102,051	–
Registered voters/turnout		139,754	73.02
Source: Commission on Elections

==== Sulu's 2nd district ====
Candidate	Party	Votes	%
Wilson Anni (incumbent)	Lakas–NUCD/United Muslim Democrats of the Philippines	67,528	20.19
Mctmir Tillah	Lakas–NUCD/United Muslim Democrats of the Philippines	62,399	18.66
Hadji Anton Burahan	Lakas–NUCD/United Muslim Democrats of the Philippines	59,034	17.65
Abdulajid Estino	Islamic Party of the Philippines–Laban ng Demokratikong Pilipino	49,658	14.85
Bassar Abdurajak (incumbent)	Laban ng Demokratikong Pilipino	48,416	14.48
Albar Arbison	Laban ng Demokratikong Pilipino	47,405	14.17
Total		334,440	100.00
Total votes		117,835	–
Registered voters/turnout		124,452	94.68
Source: Commission on Elections

==== Tawi-Tawi's lone district ====
Candidate	Party	Votes	%
Ruby Sahali	Independent	43,988	18.64
Ismael Abubakar Jr. (incumbent)	Nationalist People's Coalition	32,209	13.65
Hadji Anuar Abubakar	Lakas–NUCD/United Muslim Democrats of the Philippines	29,488	12.49
Abdul Halim Mohammad	Laban ng Demokratikong Pilipino	24,792	10.50
Abdulcadir Ibrahim (incumbent)	Laban ng Demokratikong Pilipino	23,660	10.02
Abubakar Mohammad	Lakas–NUCD/United Muslim Democrats of the Philippines	23,594	10.00
Hadji San Amilhasan	Laban ng Demokratikong Pilipino	19,501	8.26
George Lee (incumbent)	Independent	10,190	4.32
Datu Abubakar Halun	Islamic Party of the Philippines	10,102	4.28
Faizal Hussin	Islamic Party of the Philippines	9,921	4.20
Amirbahal Aluk	Independent	7,419	3.14
Asher Cheong	Independent	677	0.29
Abubakar Masdal	Islamic Party of the Philippines	349	0.15
Lajate Biteng	National Union of Christian Democrats	67	0.03
Mohammadnur Ajihil	Independent	58	0.02
Total		236,015	100.00
Total votes		86,700	–
Registered voters/turnout		115,690	74.94
Source: Commission on Elections

== See also ==
- Commission on Elections
- Politics of the Philippines
- Philippine elections
