= 2001 Autonomous Region in Muslim Mindanao general election =

2001 ARMM general election
← 1996	November 26, 2001	2005 →
Nominee	Parouk Hussin	Ibrahim Taglas III
Party	Lakas	Independent
Running mate	Mahid Mutilan	Benjamin Loong
Popular vote	585,435	237,868
Percentage	68.34%	27.77%
Regional Governor before election
Nur Misuari
Lakas
Elected Regional Governor
Parouk Hussin
Lakas

Autonomous Region in Muslim Mindanao general elections were held for the first time in the newly expanded Autonomous Region in Muslim Mindanao. In 2001, Republic Act No. 9054 was passed for the expansion of the ARMM to include the areas which initially rejected inclusion and the provinces which were carved from them, however only Marawi City and Basilan with the exception of Isabela City opted to be integrated in the region. Special ARMM Elections for the regional governor and vice-governor posts happened on November 26, 2001.

== Results ==
=== Regional governor ===
2001 ARMM gubernatorial election
Party	Candidate	Votes	%
Lakas	Hussin, Parouk S.	585,435	68.34%
Independent	Paglas, Ibrahim III P.	237,868	27.77%
Independent	Abbas, Macapanton Jr. Y.	7,476	0.87%
LDP	Amin, Hussin U.	7,091	0.83%
KAMPI	Karon, Faizal G.	6,339	0.74%
Independent	Nooh, Ahmad D.	6,041	0.71%
Independent	Espaldon, Romulo M.	2,237	0.26%
Independent	Matalam, Jimmy B.	727	0.08%
Independent	Datu Saud, Hadji Sharief U.	657	0.08%
Islamic Party of the Phils.	Baraguir, Sangacala M.	647	0.08%
PDP–Laban	Isnaji, Alarez S.	496	0.06%
Independent	Idrijani, Limpasan B.	474	0.06%
Independent	Pendatun, Saidona M.	450	0.05%
Independent	Orejudos, Elsie N.	335	0.04%
Ompia	Batara, Nasser K.	272	0.03%
Independent	Defino, Ephraim B.	133	0.02%
Margin of victory		347,567	40.57%
Total votes		856,678	100.00%
Lakas hold			

=== Regional vice-governor ===
2001 ARMM vice-gubernatorial election
Party	Candidate	Votes	%
Lakas	Mutilan, Mahid M.	549,705	66.62%
Independent	Loong, Benjamin T.	247,432	29.99%
Independent	Midtimbang, Midpantao M.	7,159	0.87%
Independent	Sheik Al-Aman, Usman I.	4,642	0.56%
KAMPI	Lucman, Tarhata A.	4,236	0.51%
Independent	Rasul, Fatima Irene I.	3,362	0.41%
People's Leadership Party	Laguindab, Abdulmalik P.C.L	3,085	0.37%
Independent	Sema, Bai Sandra A.	2,421	0.29%
Independent	Comadug, Malailah D.	807	0.10%
Independent	Laguindab, Ali P.	789	0.10%
Independent	Dianalan, Jiamil M.	668	0.08%
Ompia	Hadjinor, Abdulbasit A.	466	0.06%
Independent	Lomondot, Rocma A.	338	0.04%
Margin of victory		302,110	36.63%
Total votes		825,110	100.00%
Lakas hold			
