= Nabil Tan =

Filipino politician and lawyer

- نَبِلْ تَنْ
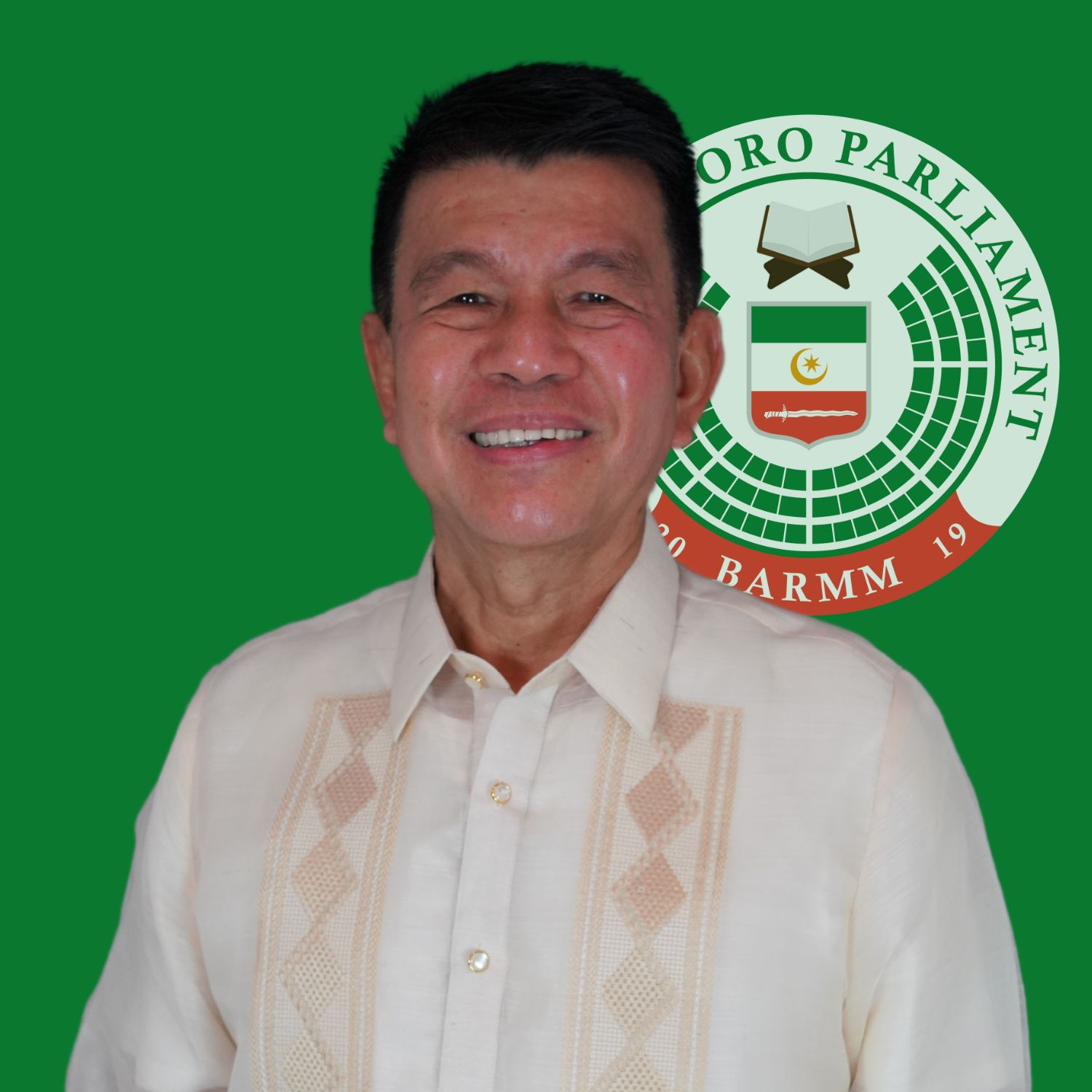
- Official portrait as MP

Deputy Speaker of the Bangsamoro Parliament
- Incumbent
- Assumed office January 19, 2021
- Speaker: Pangalian Balindong; Mohammad Yacob

Member of the Bangsamoro Transition Authority Parliament
- Incumbent
- Assumed office February 22, 2019
- Nominated by: Philippine national government
- Appointed by: Rodrigo Duterte; Bongbong Marcos

Presidential Adviser on the Peace Process
- Officer-in-charge
- In office October 2009 – November 2009
- Preceded by: Avelino Razon
- Succeeded by: Annabelle Abaya
- In office 2001
- President: Gloria Macapagal Arroyo

Vice Governor of the Autonomous Region in Muslim Mindanao
- In office April 2, 1993 – December 31, 1996
- Governor: Lininding Pangandaman; Nur Misuari
- Preceded by: Benjamin Loong
- Succeeded by: Guimid Matalam

Member of the ARMM Regional Legislative Assembly for Sulu's 1st district
- In office March 13, 1990 – September 31, 1993 Serving with Habib Aminkadra Abubakar; Abdulgajer Ismael

Personal details
- Born: Nabil Alfad Tan; April 22, 1955 (age 71) Sulu
- Party: Lakas–NUCD–UMDP (c. 1990s)
- Profession: Lawyer

Nabil Alfad Tan OLH (born April 22, 1955) is a Filipino politician and lawyer serving as a member of the Bangsamoro Parliament since 2019, where he currently serves as a deputy speaker since 2021.

== Early life and education ==
Tan is a native Tausug from Sulu. He attended elementary school at the Philippine Muslim College, and high school at the Notre Dame of Jolo College. He earned his Bachelor of Arts in political science and Bachelor of Laws degrees at the University of the East in Manila, and later pursued a masters degree in government management at the Pamantasan ng Lungsod ng Maynila. He passed the bar examination in March 1981.

== Political career ==
=== Early years ===
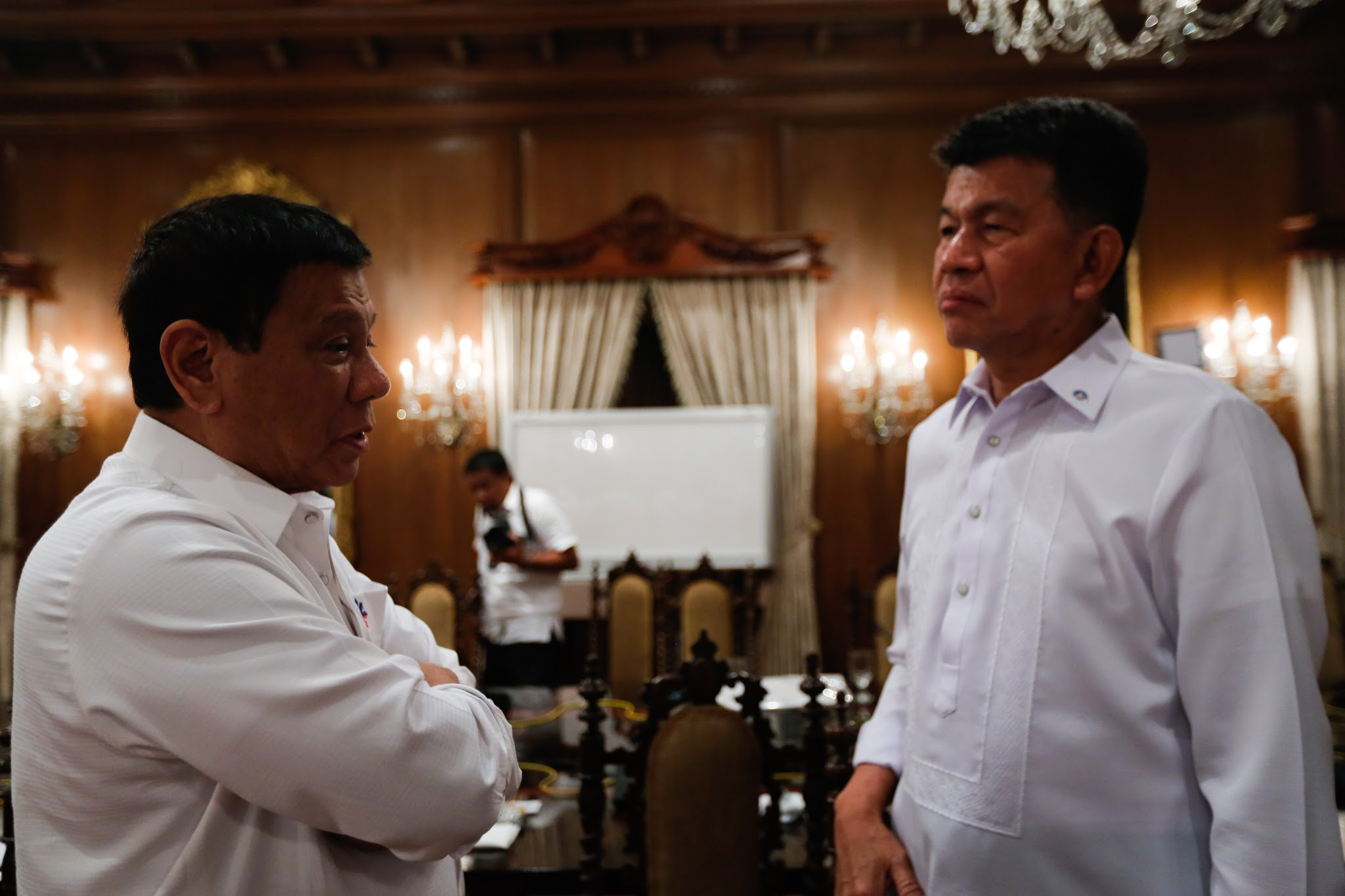
Tan (right) with President Rodrigo Duterte (left) in 2016

Tan initially served as the Chief of the Legislative Staff of the national House of Representatives from 1988 to 1989 in the 8th Congress, prior to beginning his political career in 1990, when he was elected to the ARMM Regional Legislative Assembly as a member for the first district of Sulu.

Near the end of his term as an assemblyman, Tan was elected Regional Vice Governor of the former Autonomous Region in Muslim Mindanao in 1993.

In 1998, he received the Philippine Legion of Honor from President Fidel V. Ramos, with the rank of Officer (pinuno).

From 2011 to 2019, Tan was the Undersecretary of the Office of the President during the administrations of presidents Benigno Aquino III and Rodrigo Duterte. He was also the Undersecretary of the Office of Presidential Adviser on the Peace Process (OPAPP) and Implemented Panel Chair of the national government from May 2006 until 2019. He was appointed officer-in-charge of the OPAPP first in 2001, and again in October 2009, serving until November of the same year.

=== Bangsamoro Parliament (since 2019) ===
Tan was one of the 40 nominees of the national government to serve as members of the newly-established Bangsamoro Parliament in 2019. He was appointed to the Parliament by President Rodrigo Duterte, and was elected deputy speaker in the first interim Parliament. He was reappointed in 2022 and 2025 by President Bongbong Marcos.

After the death of incumbent speaker Pangalian Balindong in October 2025, Tan was considered as one of the candidates for the speakership, alongside fellow MP Jose Lorena. He instead supported and nominated Mohammad Yacob, who was unanimously elected by the Parliament to succeed Balindong on October 21, 2025.

== Electoral history ==
Electoral history of Nabil Tan
Year	Office	Party	Votes received				Result
Year	Office	Party	Total	%	P.	Swing	Result
1993	Vice Governor of ARMM	Lakas	442,798	54.67%	1st	—N/a	Won

== Honors ==
- Philippine Legion of Honor, Officer (Pinuno)
