= Guimid Matalam =

Filipino politician (1937–2022)

Datu Guimid Matalam
- Matalam's official portrait during the 8th Congress

Member of the Philippine House of Representatives for Maguindanao's 2nd district
- In office June 30, 2001 – June 30, 2004
- Preceded by: Simeon Datumanong
- Succeeded by: Simeon Datumanong
- In office June 30, 1987 – June 30, 1992
- Preceded by: District established
- Succeeded by: Simeon Datumanong

3rd Vice Governor of the Autonomous Region in Muslim Mindanao
- In office September 30, 1996 – June 30, 2001
- Governor: Nur Misuari
- Preceded by: Nabil Tan
- Succeeded by: Mahid Mutilan

3rd Speaker of the ARMM Regional Legislative Assembly
- In office 1993–1996
- Preceded by: Pangalian Balindong
- Succeeded by: Alvarez Isnaji

Member of the ARMM Regional Legislative Assembly
- In office 1993–1996

Personal details
- Born: December 15, 1937 Pagalungan, Maguindanao, Philippine Islands
- Died: May 17, 2022 (aged 84) Tacurong, Sultan Kudarat, Philippines
- Party: PMP (2008)
- Other political affiliations: NPC (2003–2004); IPP (2003–2004); Lakas (1992–2003); Independent (2000); PDP–Laban (1987–1992)
- Spouse: Bai Moniera Pendatun
- Education: University of Mindanao (AB); Far Eastern University (LLB)
- Nickname: Jimmy

Datu Guimid Panalangin Matalam (December 15, 1937 – May 17, 2022), also known as Jimmy Matalam, was a Filipino lawyer and politician who served as the representative for Maguindanao's 2nd congressional district in the Philippine House of Representatives from 1987 to 1992 and from 2001 to 2004. He previously served as vice governor of the Autonomous Region in Muslim Mindanao from 1996 to 2001 and as a member of the ARMM Regional Legislative Assembly from 1993 to 1996, concurrently serving as its speaker.

== Early life and education ==
Guimid Panalangin Matalam was born on December 15, 1937, in Pagalungan, Maguindanao, to Datu Udtog Matalam Sr. and Pinamili Panalangin. He attended Pagalungan Elementary School for his primary education and Davao City High School for his secondary education. In 1958, Matalam graduated from the University of Mindanao with a Bachelor of Arts degree and later earned a Bachelor of Laws degree from Far Eastern University in 1962.

== Early career ==
Matalam worked as a technical assistant in the office of House speaker pro tempore Salipada Pendatun from 1962 to 1965. He was later elected to Region XII's Regional Legislative Assembly in the 1979 Sangguniang Pampook elections.

== House of Representatives (1987–1992) ==
Following the restoration of Congress in 1987, Matalam successfully ran for the seat representing Maguindanao's 2nd congressional district in the House of Representatives under PDP–Laban. At the opening session of the 8th Congress, he administered the oath of office to newly elected House speaker Ramon Mitra Jr.

During his first term as representative, Matalam chaired the House Committee on Muslim Affairs and served on five standing committees and three subcommittees as part of the majority bloc.

Matalam ran for re-election in 1992, but lost to Simeon Datumanong.

== ARMM Regional Legislative Assembly (1993–1996) ==
In 1993, Matalam ran for a seat in the Autonomous Region in Muslim Mindanao's Regional Legislative Assembly under Lakas–NUCD. He won the election and was later elected speaker, serving until 1996.

== Vice Governor of ARMM (1996–2001) ==
Matalam was elected vice governor of the ARMM in 1996 unopposed as the running mate of Nur Misuari, who was elected regional governor.

== Return to the House of Representatives (2001–2004) ==
Incumbent Maguindanao's 2nd district representative Simeon Datumanong resigned in January 2001 after being appointed secretary of public works and highways by President Gloria Macapagal Arroyo, leaving the seat vacant ahead of the May 2001 elections. Matalam ran for the seat and won, serving in the 12th Congress.

== Post-congessional career (2004–2022) ==
Matalam ran for governor of Maguindanao in the 2004 elections but lost to incumbent Andal Ampatuan Sr. He later ran for regional governor of the ARMM under Pwersa ng Masang Pilipino but was defeated by Zaldy Ampatuan, placing fourth among seven candidates.

In 2015, Matalam, a former head of the Department of Agrarian Reform in the ARMM, was found guilty of failing to remit millions of pesos in contributions to the Government Service Insurance System and the Pag-IBIG Fund for the period from January 1997 to June 1998.

== Personal life ==
Matalam was married to Bai Moniera Pendatun. He died on May 17, 2022.

== Electoral history ==
Electoral history of Guimid Matalam
Year	Office	Party		Votes received				Result
Year	Office	Local	National	Total	%	P.	Swing	Result
1987	Representative (Maguindanao–2nd)	—N/a	PDP–Laban	—N/a	—N/a	1st	—N/a	Won
1992	Representative (Maguindanao–2nd)	—N/a	Lakas	40,588	42.96%	2nd	—N/a	Lost
2001	Representative (Maguindanao–2nd)	—N/a	Lakas	—N/a	—N/a	1st	—N/a	Won
1993	Assemblyman (ARMM)	—N/a	Lakas	77,323	16.89%	2nd	—N/a	Won
1996	Vice Governor of ARMM	—N/a	Lakas	529,695	100.00%	1st	—N/a	Unopposed
2004	Governor of Maguindanao	IPP	NPC	—N/a	—N/a	2nd	—N/a	Lost
2008	Governor of ARMM	—N/a	PMP	15,283	1.40%	4th	—N/a	Lost

House of Representatives of the Philippines
Preceded by Simeon Datumanong	Member of the Philippine House of Representatives for Maguindanao's 2nd district 2001–2004	Succeeded by Simeon Datumanong
New district	Member of the Philippine House of Representatives for Maguindanao's 2nd district 1987–1992	Succeeded by Simeon Datumanong
Political offices
Preceded by Nabil Tan	Vice Governor of the Autonomous Region in Muslim Mindanao; 2001–2004	Succeeded by Mahid Mutilan
Preceded by Pangalian Balindong	Speaker of the ARMM Regional Legislative Assembly; 1993–1996	Succeeded by Alvarez Isnaji
