= Benjamin Loong =

Filipino politician

- تُڤَيْ لُؤُڠْ
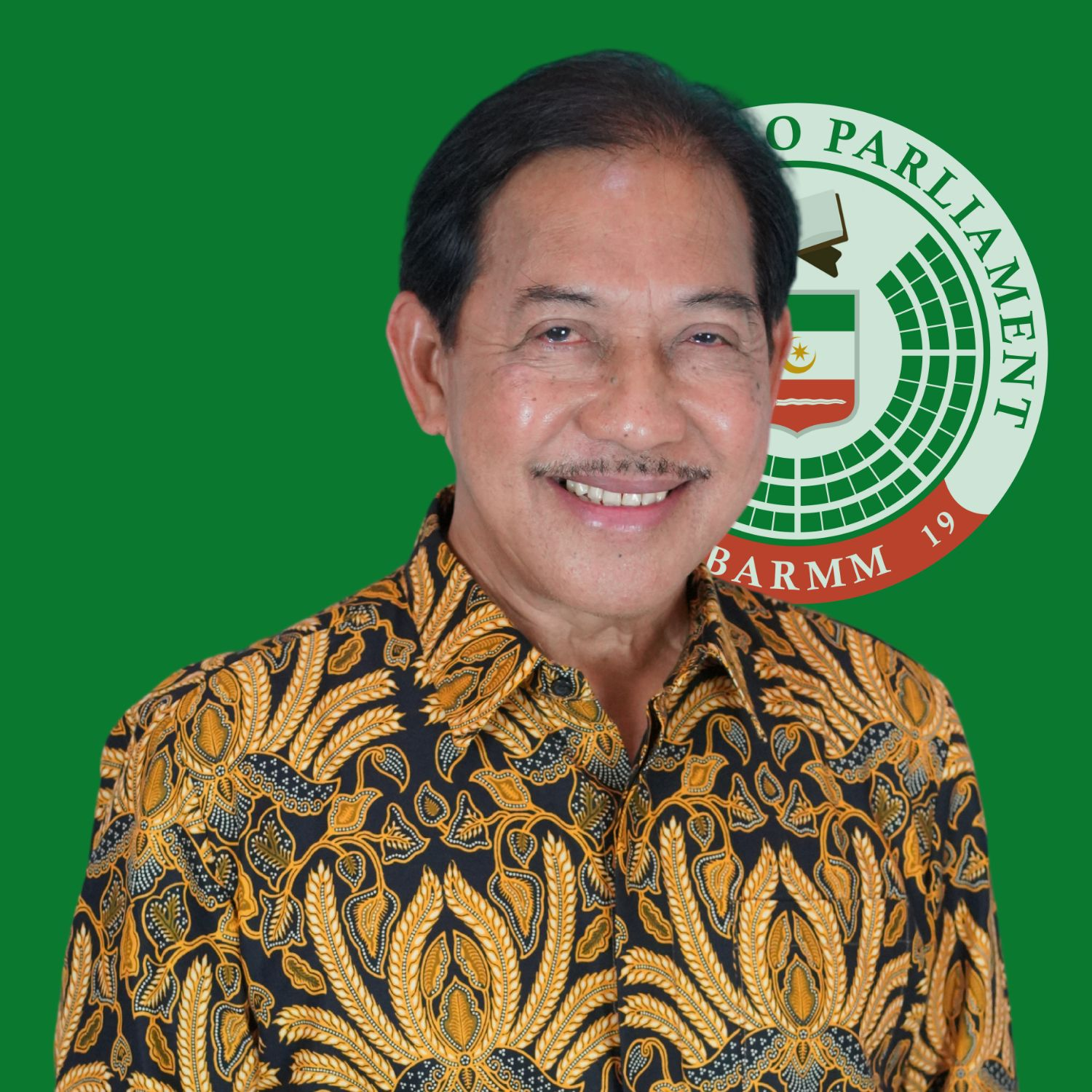
- Official portrait as MP

Deputy Speaker of the Bangsamoro Parliament
- In office September 15, 2022 – May 21, 2025
- Speaker: Pangalian Balindong

Member of the Bangsamoro Transition Authority Parliament
- Incumbent
- Assumed office September 15, 2022
- Nominated by: Moro Islamic Liberation Front
- Appointed by: Bongbong Marcos

Governor of Sulu
- In office June 30, 2004 – June 30, 2007
- Vice Governor: Nur-Ana Sahidulla
- Preceded by: Yusop Jikiri
- Succeeded by: Abdusakur Tan

Vice Governor of Sulu
- In office June 30, 2010 – June 30, 2013
- Governor: Abdusakur Tan
- Preceded by: Nur-Ana Sahidulla
- Succeeded by: Abdusakur Tan

Vice Governor of the Autonomous Region in Muslim Mindanao
- In office 1990–1993
- Governor: Zacaria Candao
- Preceded by: Office established
- Succeeded by: Nabil Tan

Personal details
- Born: Benjamin Tupay Loong; July 4, 1954 (age 72) Patikul, Sulu
- Party: Lakas–CMD

Benjamin "Ben" Tupay Loong (born July 4, 1954) is a Filipino politician who previously served as the governor of the province of Sulu, a part of the former Autonomous Region in Muslim Mindanao in the Philippines, from 2004 to 2007. He is the younger brother of Tupay Loong, a former member of the Philippine House of Representatives from Sulu's 1st district.

He currently serves as a member of the Bangsamoro Parliament since 2022.

== Background ==
Loong is a native of Parang, Sulu. He took up a management degree at the University of the East.

== Political career ==
=== Vice governor of ARMM (1990–1993) ===
Loong started out as a businessman, running a coco oil company and serving as a member of the Mindanao Business Council (MBC). However, he quickly entered politics alongside his brother Tupay Loong. He won his first election as ARMM regional vice governor in 1990. He ran in 2001 as an independent for ARMM vice governor alongside Ibrahim Paglas, a former mayor and businessman, but was bested by administration-backed candidates Parouk Hussin and Mahid Mutilan.

=== Governor of Sulu (2004–2007) ===
He became head of the MBC and competed in the Sulu provincial elections in 2004, this time winning the gubernatorial post. However, Loong was sidelined in the 2007 election in a political shifting of loyalties involving Abdulmunir Mundoc Arbison shifting his support to Abdusakur Mahail Tan.

The Loong brothers are known to be political rivals with Governor Tan and former ARMM assemblyman Garcia Tingkahan.

=== Post-gubernatorial career (2007–2022) ===
Loong later served one term as vice governor of Sulu from 2010 to 2013.

In 2011, Loong faced a graft complaint before the Sandiganbayan on charges of irregularities involving livelihood and infrastructure projects. The charges were eventually dropped by the Ombudsman in 2012.

=== Bangsamoro Parliament (since 2022) ===
In 2022, Loong was nominated by the Moro Islamic Liberation Front to serve as one of the members of the second interim Bangsamoro Parliament. He was thereafter appointed by President Bongbong Marcos. He served as one of the deputy speakers of the Parliament from 2022 to 2025.
