= Parouk Hussin =

Filipino Muslim physician and politician

- فَرُؤُكْ هُسِّنْ

4th Governor of the Autonomous Region in Muslim Mindanao
- In office December 27, 2001 – September 30, 2005
- Vice Governor: Mahid Mutilan
- Preceded by: Nur Misuari; Alvarez Isnaji (acting)
- Succeeded by: Zaldy Ampatuan

Personal details
- Party: Lakas–CMD (until 2005)
- Profession: Medical doctor

Military service
- Allegiance: Moro National Liberation Front

Parouk S. Hussin is a Filipino politician, doctor, and former rebel who was the Governor of the Autonomous Region in Muslim Mindanao (ARMM) from 2001 to 2005.

== Political career ==
Hussin was elected as Governor of the now defunct Autonomous Region in Muslim Mindanao (ARMM) during the 2001 elections. Mahid Mutilan was elected as his vice governor. He ran under the Lakas–CMD Party, the same party of then incumbent President Gloria Macapagal Arroyo. However his assumption to office would be delayed since his predecessor inter governor Alvarez Isnaji refused to vacate the position. Isnaji had the regional trial court issue a temporary restraining order, believing that under the ARMM charter Hussin can only assume office in 2002 since he was elected a month after the supposed start of his tenure. The restraining order was later lifted.

Hussin would take over on December 27, 2001. His took his oath-taking before President Arroyo in Cotabato City on January 5, 2002. Under his tenure, he established the Regional Peace and Order Council which provides a mechanism for traditional dispute resolution in the ARMM.

He ran for Senator in the 2004 national elections under the Koalisyon ng Katapatan at Karanasan sa Kinabukasan (K4) coalition and supported President Arroyo's successful re-election bid.

Hussin was part of the Lakas–CMD Party until 2005. He left after the party decided to endorse Zaldy Ampatuan as its gubernatorial candidate in the 2005 ARMM elections. Hussin did launch a bid to retain his position in the elections but withdrew his candidacy. He cited the MNLF's decision to boycott the elections due to the Arroyo administration endorsement of Ampatuan, a non-MNLF member and the "credibility crisis" affecting the Commission on Elections arising from the Hello Garci scandal as among the reasons for his withdrawal. Ampatuan won the elections and Hussin turned over the governorship on September 30, 2005.

Hussin's purchase of medical kits from Geneve SA Philippines in 2003 when he was governor would be a subject of a legal case filed in 2008. He would be convicted for violations of the Anti-Graft and Corrupt Practices Act in March 2021 by the Sandiganbayan for irregularities regarding the transaction.

== Involvement in the MNLF ==
Hussin is a longtime member of the separatist group Moro National Liberation Front (MNLF). He was part of the Executive Council of 15, a faction within the MNLF which stopped recognizing founder Nur Misuari as its chairman in May 2001.

In December 2006, he was removed from his position as foreign affairs chief in the MNLF by the faction led by secretary general Muslimin Sema. Hussin alleged that his removal was because he was trying to unite the organization under close cooperation with the Organization of Islamic Conference (OIC) and founding chairman Misuari. Sema said he was removed due to a "very serious" undisclosed grounds.

== Personal life ==
Hussin is an ethnic Tausug from Maimbung, Sulu. He is also a doctor by profession.
