= Mohammad Yacob =

Filipino politician (born 1970)

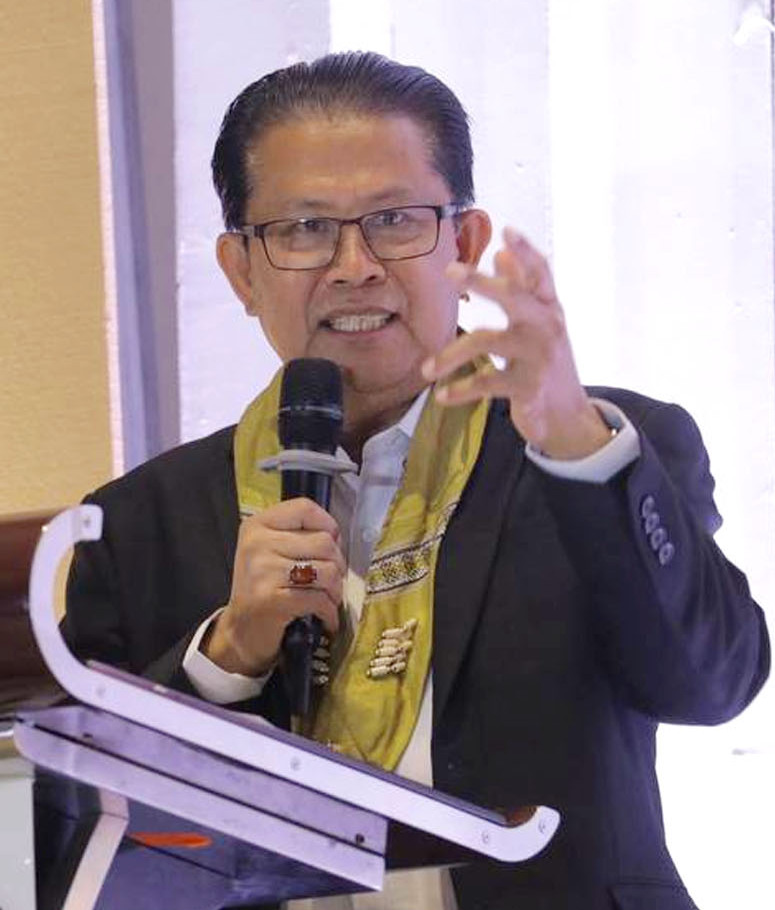
- Yaacob in 2025

Speaker of the Bangsamoro Transition Authority Parliament
- In office October 21, 2025 – October 30, 2026
- Nominated by: Bangsamoro Transition Authority
- Chief Minister: Abdulraof Macacua
- Preceded by: Pangalian Balindong
- Succeeded by: Amer Zaakaria Rakim (as speaker of the Bangsamoro Parliament)

Bangsamoro Minister of the Agriculture, Fisheries and Agrarian Reform
- In office February 26, 2019 – April 14, 2025
- Chief Minister: Murad Ebrahim; Abdulraof Macacua
- Preceded by: Office established
- Succeeded by: Abunawas Maslamama

Member of the Bangsamoro Transition Authority Parliament
- Incumbent
- Assumed office March 29, 2019
- Nominated by: Moro Islamic Liberation Front
- Appointed by: Rodrigo Duterte; Bongbong Marcos
- Chief Minister: Murad Ebrahim; Abdulraof Macacua

Personal details
- Born: Mohammad Shuaib Yacob; April 30, 1970 (age 56) Maganoy, Maguindanao, Philippines
- Occupation: Lawyer, politician

Mohammad Shuaib Yacob is a Filipino politician who is a member of the Bangsamoro Parliament. He served as the speaker of the regional parliament from 2025 to 2026.

== Early life and education ==
Mohammad Shuaib Yacob was born on April 30, 1970, in Maganoy, Maguindanao (now Shariff Aguak, Maguindanao del Sur) He attended the a Shari’ah Law degree holder at Islamic University of Madinah in Saudi Arabia where he obtained a Sharia law degree. He is also a holder of a philosophy doctorate from the Cotabato State University in Cotabato City.

== Career ==
Yacob was executive director of the Moro Islamic Liberation Front-led non-governmental organization, the Bangsamoro Development Agency for nine years.

Yacob is among the inaugural members of the 1st Bangsamoro Transition Authority (BTA) Parliament appointed by President Rodrigo Duterte in 2019. He was retained in the Bangsamoro Parliament in 2022, when Marcos appointed him to the 2nd BTA Parliament. In 2019, he was also appointed as concurrent head of the Ministry of Agriculture, Fisheries and Agrarian Reform (MAFAR). On April 14, 2025, he became the Senior Minister succeeding Abunawas Maslamama. Maslamama took over Yacob's previous portfolio.

Yacob was elected as the Speaker of the Bangsamoro Parliament on October 21, 2025, succeeding Pangalian Balindong who died in office on October 2. Other candidates reportedly included Nabil Tan, Jose Lorena, Odin Sumagayan, Ahmad Amir Alonto-Adiong.
