= 1996 Autonomous Region in Muslim Mindanao general election =

General elections are held in the Autonomous Region in Muslim Mindanao for the Regional Governor and Vice-Governor were held on September 9, 1996. Comelec conducted the pilot test for their computerized counting system during this election.

== Results ==
=== For Regional Governor ===
Summary of the final official COMELEC canvass of the 9 September 1996 Autonomous Region in Muslim Mindanao general election results
Candidate	Party
Nurallaj Misuari	Lakas-NUCD-UMDP

=== For Regional Vice-Governor ===
Summary of the final official COMELEC canvass of the 9 September 1996 Autonomous Region in Muslim Mindanao general election results
Candidate	Party
Guimid Matalam	Lakas-NUCD-UMDP

== See also ==
- Commission on Elections
- Politics of the Philippines
- Philippine elections
