= Speaker of the Bangsamoro Parliament =

Political position in the Philippines

- Tagapagsalita ng Parlamento ng Bangsamoro
- Seal of the Bangsamoro Parliament

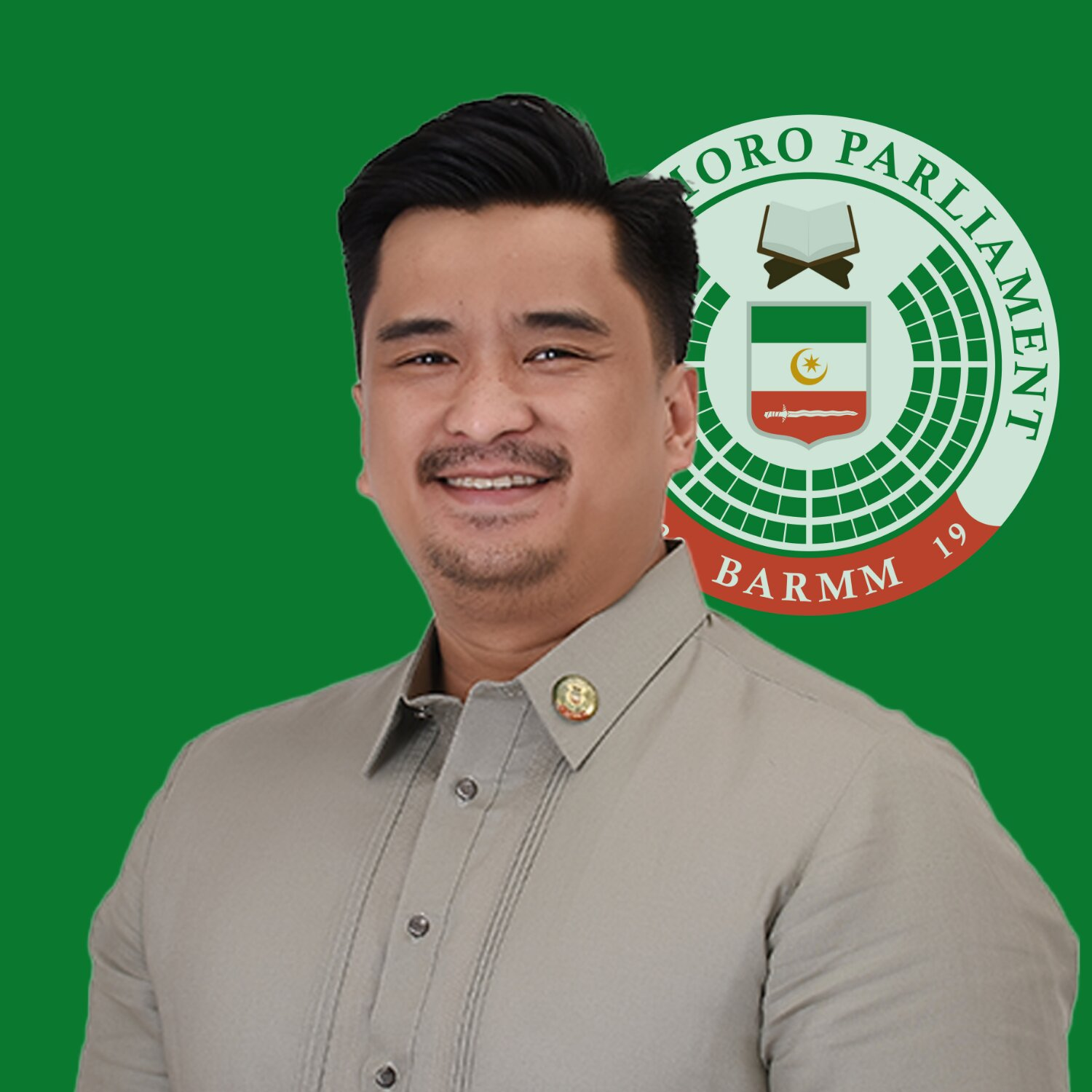
- Incumbent; Amer Zaakaria Rakim since October 30, 2026
- Bangsamoro Parliament
- Style: Mr. Speaker (informal); The Honorable (formal)
- Member of: Bangsamoro Parliament
- Seat: Bangsamoro Parliament Building, Cotabato City
- Appointer: Bangsamoro Parliament
- Precursor: Speaker of the ARMM Regional Legislative Assembly
- Formation: March 29, 2019; 7 years ago
- First holder: Pangalian Balindong
- Deputy: Deputy Speakers

The speaker of the Bangsamoro Parliament (Filipino: Tagapagsalita ng Parlamento ng Bangsamoro) is the presiding officer of the Bangsamoro Parliament, the regional legislature of Bangsamoro Autonomous Region in Muslim Mindanao (BARMM) of the Philippines.

The current speaker of the Parliament is Amer Zaakaria Rakim, a member of the BARMM Grand Coalition.

== History ==
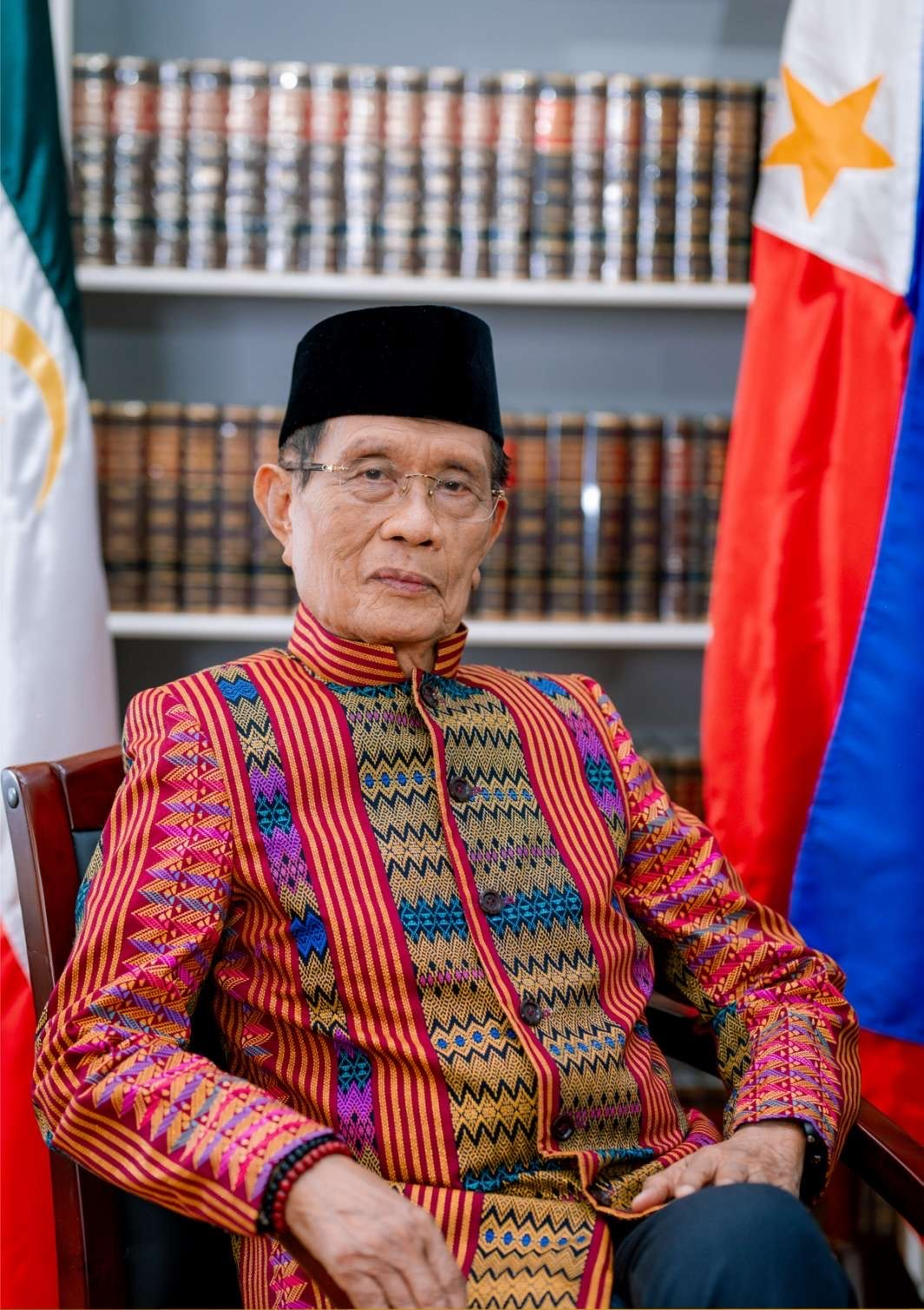
Pangalian Balindong was the first speaker of the interim Bangsamoro Parliament.

Prior to the establishment of the Bangsamoro Parliament on March 29, 2019, Chief Minister Murad Ebrahim named Moro Islamic Liberation Front (MILF) leader Ghazali Jaafar as the person he preferred to become the first speaker of the parliament with lawyer and former Lanao del Sur congressman Pangalian Balindong as Jaafar's deputy. However, Jaafar died on March 13, 2019 prior to the first convening of the parliament.

At the start of the inaugural session of the parliament, there were two nominees for the speakership, Balindong and Laisa Alamia, with the former elected by the interim Bangsamoro Parliament as its speaker. Hatimil Hassan was elected as Balindong's deputy speaker. Additional co-deputies were elected by the parliament at later dates.

Pangalian Balindong died on October 2, 2025. An election for his successor was held on October 21, 2025, with Mohammad Yacob, a fellow MILF nominee, being sworn in as the new speaker.

== Duties and powers ==
The speaker is the presiding officer of the Bangsamoro Parliament whose role is to secure the honor of the parliament, ensure the rights and privileges of its members, and assure public access to its proceedings. The same presiding role could also be fulfilled by the speaker's deputies.

Furthermore, according to Rule IV, Section 14 of the Rules, Procedures, and Practices of the Parliament, the duties and powers of the speaker include the following:

- Preside on all plenary sessions of the Parliament, except as hereunder otherwise provided. He/she shall open, conduct, and close each session day
- Be responsible for the management of the proceedings and conduct of business of the Parliament
- Maintain proper order and ensure that the right procedures are followed
- Remain impartial during all debates and if he/she wishes to participate in the debate, he/she shall temporarily relinquish the chair
- Vote only to break a tie
- Be responsible over the use of the resources and facilities of the Parliament
- Conduct regular monthly caucus of all Members of the Parliament or as often as may be necessary to discuss priority measures and to facilitate dialogue, consensus and actions on issues and concerns affecting the Parliament and the performance of its functions
- Exercise general supervision over all committees and, in furtherance thereof, conduct regular monthly meetings with the chairpersons and vice-chairpersons of all Statutory and Parliamentary Committees to set legislative targets, review performance in the attainment of targets, ensure that the priority legislative measures of committees are attuned to the legislative agenda of the Parliament and resolve such issues and concerns that affect the operations and performance of the committees
- Designate a Member of the Parliament as temporary presiding officer after informing the Deputy Speakers; provided, that any such designation shall be effective for one session day only
- Sign all acts, resolutions, and bills that may be issued by or upon order of the Parliament

The speaker also has administrative supervision over legislative personnel, staff, and secretariat of the Bangsamoro Parliament and is also the appointing authority of all career positions within the parliament. However, the speaker is mandated to consult with the chief minister first for appointments of positions which has a salary grade of 25 and above. The speaker must also present to the chief minister every bill before signing into law, and for him to submit a certified true copy of all laws and resolutions approved by the Parliament to the president and to the national Congress.

== Election ==
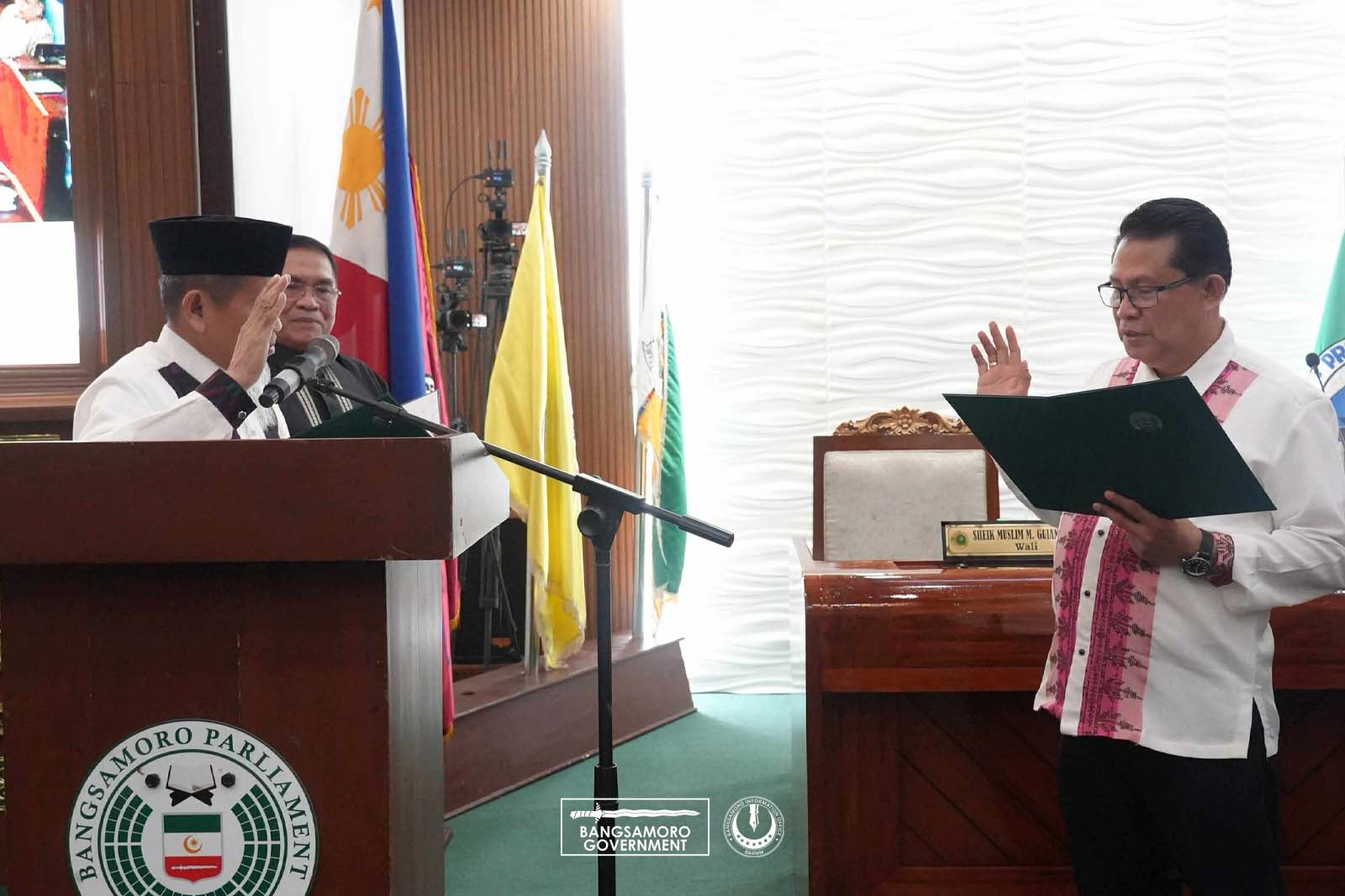
Mohammad Yacob (right) takes his oath as the new speaker of the Bangsamoro Parliament on October 21, 2025, before Wālī Sheikh Muslim Guiamaden (left).

The speaker is elected by a majority vote of all members of the Parliament through a standing vote without explanation. Should there be more than two nominees and none received the required majority, a run-off election between the two nominees who obtained the most number of votes is held. Abstentions are not allowed during a run-off election.

The following is a list of elections for Speaker of the Bangsamoro Parliament:

=== March 2019 ===
An election for speaker of the Bangsamoro Parliament took place on March 29, 2019, at the start of the first interim parliament. Pangalian Balindong received a majority of the votes cast and was elected speaker.

2019 election for speaker
Affiliation	Candidate	Votes	%
MILF	Pangalian Balindong	Majority	(Note: As the specific number of votes in the election is not known, a candidate vote percentage is indeterminable.)
National Government	Laisa Alamia	(?)	(Note: As the specific number of votes in the election is not known, a candidate vote percentage is indeterminable.)
Total votes		92	100.00

=== September 2022 ===
An election for speaker took place on September 15, 2022, at the start of the second interim parliament. Pangalian Balindong received a majority of the votes cast and was re-elected speaker.

2022 election for speaker
Affiliation	Candidate	Votes	%
MILF	Pangalian Balindong	79	100.00
Total votes		79	100.00

=== October 2025 ===
On October 2, 2025, Pangalian Balindong died, leaving the position of the speaker of the Parliament vacant. Consequently, an intra-term election for a new speaker was held on October 21, 2025, during the second interim parliament. Mohammad Yacob received a majority of the votes cast and was elected speaker.

2025 election for speaker
Affiliation	Candidate	Votes	%
MILF	Mohammad Yacob	67	100.00
Total votes		67	100.00

=== October 2026 ===
An election for speaker took place on October 30, 2026, at the start of the first regular parliament. Amer Zaakaria Rakim received a majority of the votes cast and was elected speaker.

2026 election for speaker
Party	Candidate	Votes	%
BGC	Amer Zaakaria Rakim	51	65.38
UBJP	Mohammad Yacob	27	34.62
Total votes		78	100.00

== List of speakers ==
No.	Portrait	Name (Lifespan)	Term start	Term end	Party (Note: For speakers during the tenure of the Bangsamoro Transition Authority, their nominators are stated.)	Parliament
—		Pangalian Balindong; Member of the BTA (1940–2025); Interim	March 29, 2019	October 2, 2025	MILF	1st BTA Parliament
—		Pangalian Balindong; Member of the BTA (1940–2025); Interim	March 29, 2019	October 2, 2025	MILF	2nd BTA Parliament
Vacant (October 2–21, 2025)						2nd BTA Parliament
—		Mohammad Yacob; Member of the BTA (born 1970); Interim	October 21, 2025	October 30, 2026	MILF	2nd BTA Parliament
1		Amer Zaakaria Rakim; Proportional MP (born 1990)	October 30, 2026	Incumbent	BGC	1st Parliament

== Deputy Speaker of the Bangsamoro Parliament ==
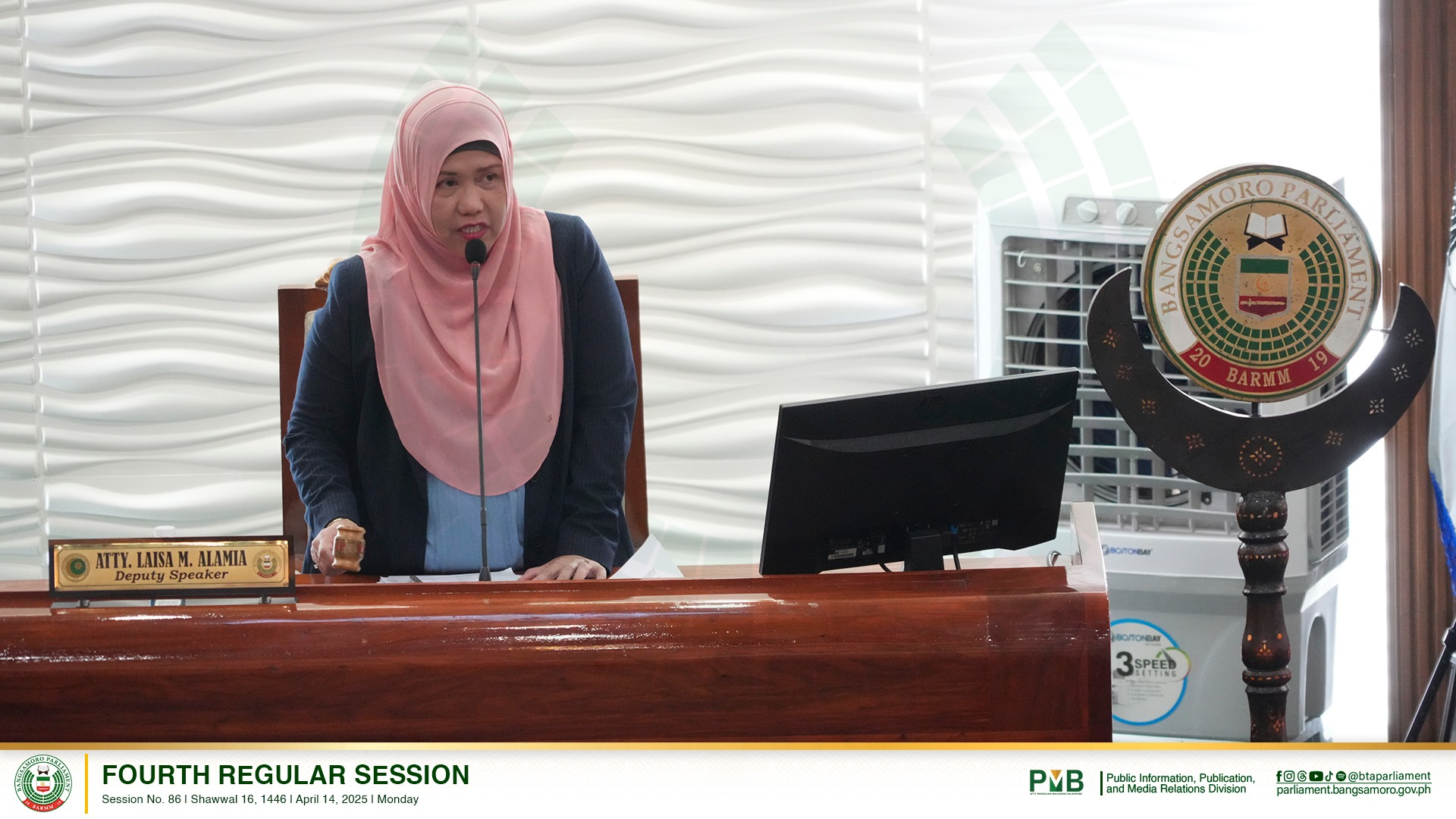
Deputy Speaker MP Laisa Alamia presides over a session of the Bangsamoro Parliament on April 14, 2025

The deputy speakers of the Bangsamoro Parliament are the second-highest-ranking officials of the Bangsamoro Parliament.

They have the following duties and responsibilities:

- Take turns in presiding over the session, when the Speaker does not preside or has not designated any other Member as temporary presiding officer;
- Recommend to the Speaker appropriate policies and programs of action to improve the process of legislation and the quality of legislative measures;
- Act as the Speaker when so designated and in accordance with the designation, in case of the temporary incapacity or absence of the Speaker, until such time that the Speaker returns to office and resumes his/her work.
  In the event that the Speaker does not make such a designation, the Deputy Speaker most senior in age shall act as the Speaker only for purposes of ensuring the continued operations of the Parliament but shall not perform items (g) and (l) in Section 4 (Note: (g) Exercise administrative supervision over the legislative personnel, staff, and secretariat of the Parliament; (l) Appoint career positions in the Parliament including co-terminus and contractual positions as well as contract of service therein;) as well as all acts not in the ordinary course of business of the Parliament.
  The Deputy Speaker most senior in age shall assume the duties and powers of the Speaker as described in the previous paragraph in case of resignation, removal, death, and permanent incapacity of the Speaker, until such time that a new Speaker has been elected and qualified. He/she shall promptly inform the Chief Minister of the fact of resignation, removal, death, or permanent incapacity;
- Serve as ex officio member to all committees with a right to vote; and
- Perform such other duties and functions as may be assigned or delegated to him/her from time to time by the Speaker.

The incumbent deputy speakers of the Parliament are Abrar Hataman, Tina Matolo-De Asis, Tawakal Midtimbang, Amilbahar Mawallil, Ibrahim Ibay, Hosni Macapodi, Lampa Pandi, Amir Balindong, Suwaib Oranon, and Jose Lorena.

Hatimil Hassan initially served as the sole deputy speaker at the start of the first interim parliament, until more deputy speakers were added beginning November 25, 2020, upon the election of Omar Yasser Sema.

=== List of deputy speakers ===
Portrait	Name (Lifespan)	Term start	Term end	Party	Speaker	Parliament
	Hatimil Hassan; Member of the BTA (born 1949); Interim	March 29, 2019	September 15, 2022	National Government	Pangalian Balindong	1st BTA Parliament
	Omar Yasser Sema; Member of the BTA (born 1972); Interim	November 25, 2020	September 15, 2022	National Government	Pangalian Balindong	1st BTA Parliament
	Zia Alonto Adiong; Member of the BTA (born 1979); Interim	January 19, 2021	June 30, 2022	National Government	Pangalian Balindong	1st BTA Parliament
	Nabil Tan; Member of the BTA (born 1955); Interim	January 19, 2021	September 15, 2022	National Government	Pangalian Balindong	1st BTA Parliament
	Hatimil Hassan; Member of the BTA (born 1949); Interim	September 15, 2022	May 21, 2025	National Government	Pangalian Balindong (until 2025) Mohammad Yacob (from 2025)	2nd BTA Parliament
	Nabil Tan; Member of the BTA (born 1955); Interim	September 15, 2022	October 30, 2026	National Government	Pangalian Balindong (until 2025) Mohammad Yacob (from 2025)	2nd BTA Parliament
	Omar Yasser Sema; Member of the BTA (born 1972); Interim	September 15, 2022	October 30, 2026	National Government	Pangalian Balindong (until 2025) Mohammad Yacob (from 2025)	2nd BTA Parliament
	Lanang Ali Jr. Member of the BTA (born 1982); Interim	September 15, 2022	October 30, 2026	MILF	Pangalian Balindong (until 2025) Mohammad Yacob (from 2025)	2nd BTA Parliament
	Paisalin Tago; Member of the BTA (born 1967); Interim	September 15, 2022	May 21, 2025	National Government	Pangalian Balindong (until 2025) Mohammad Yacob (from 2025)	2nd BTA Parliament
	Abdulkarim Misuari; Member of the BTA (born 1974); Interim	September 15, 2022	October 30, 2026	National Government	Pangalian Balindong (until 2025) Mohammad Yacob (from 2025)	2nd BTA Parliament
	Benjamin Loong; Member of the BTA (born 1954); Interim	September 15, 2022	May 21, 2025	MILF	Pangalian Balindong (until 2025) Mohammad Yacob (from 2025)	2nd BTA Parliament
	Don Mustapha Loong; Member of the BTA (born 1976); Interim	May 21, 2025	October 30, 2026	National Government	Pangalian Balindong (until 2025) Mohammad Yacob (from 2025)	2nd BTA Parliament
	John Anthony Lim; Member of the BTA (born 1979); Interim	May 21, 2025	October 21, 2025	National Government	Pangalian Balindong (until 2025) Mohammad Yacob (from 2025)	2nd BTA Parliament
	Laisa Alamia; Member of the BTA (born 1971/1972); Interim	May 21, 2025	October 30, 2026	National Government	Pangalian Balindong (until 2025) Mohammad Yacob (from 2025)	2nd BTA Parliament
	Amenodin Sumagayan; Member of the BTA (born 1975); Interim	May 21, 2025	October 30, 2026	National Government	Pangalian Balindong (until 2025) Mohammad Yacob (from 2025)	2nd BTA Parliament
	Suwaib Oranon; Member of the BTA (born 1953); Interim	May 21, 2025	October 30, 2026	MILF	Pangalian Balindong (until 2025) Mohammad Yacob (from 2025)	2nd BTA Parliament
	Baintan Ampatuan; Member of the BTA; Interim	May 21, 2025	October 30, 2026	National Government	Pangalian Balindong (until 2025) Mohammad Yacob (from 2025)	2nd BTA Parliament
	Ishak Mastura; Member of the BTA (born 1971); Interim	May 21, 2025	October 30, 2026	National Government	Pangalian Balindong (until 2025) Mohammad Yacob (from 2025)	2nd BTA Parliament
	Adzfar Usman; Member of the BTA; Interim	May 21, 2025	October 30, 2026	National Government	Pangalian Balindong (until 2025) Mohammad Yacob (from 2025)	2nd BTA Parliament
	Jose Lorena; Member of the BTA; Interim	October 21, 2025	October 30, 2026	National Government	Pangalian Balindong (until 2025) Mohammad Yacob (from 2025)	2nd BTA Parliament
	Sha Elijah Dumama-Alba; Member of the BTA (born 1981/1982); Interim	October 21, 2025	October 30, 2026	MILF	Pangalian Balindong (until 2025) Mohammad Yacob (from 2025)	2nd BTA Parliament
	Abrar Hataman; MP for Basilan–3rd (born 1999)	October 30, 2026	Incumbent	BFP	Amer Zaakaria Rakim	1st Parliament
	Tina Matolo-De Asis; MP for Tawi-Tawi–3rd (born 1986)	October 30, 2026	Incumbent	BFP	Amer Zaakaria Rakim	1st Parliament
	Tawakal Midtimbang; MP for Maguindanao del Sur–1st (born 1985)	October 30, 2026	Incumbent	UBJP	Amer Zaakaria Rakim	1st Parliament
	Amilbahar Mawallil; Proportional MP (born 1987)	October 30, 2026	Incumbent	BGC	Amer Zaakaria Rakim	1st Parliament
	Ibrahim Ibay; MP for Maguindanao del Norte–2nd (born 1967)	October 30, 2026	Incumbent	BFP	Amer Zaakaria Rakim	1st Parliament
	Hosni Macapodi; MP for Lanao del Sur–6th (born 1981)	October 30, 2026	Incumbent	SIAP	Amer Zaakaria Rakim	1st Parliament
	Lampa Pandi; MP for Lanao del Sur–4th (born 1964)	October 30, 2026	Incumbent	UBJP	Amer Zaakaria Rakim	1st Parliament
	Amir Balindong; Proportional MP (born 1969)	October 30, 2026	Incumbent	UBJP	Amer Zaakaria Rakim	1st Parliament
	Suwaib Oranon; Proportional MP (born 1953)	October 30, 2026	Incumbent	BFP	Amer Zaakaria Rakim	1st Parliament
	Jose Lorena; Proportional MP (born 1954)	October 30, 2026	Incumbent	Raayat	Amer Zaakaria Rakim	1st Parliament

== See also ==
- Speaker of the House of Representatives of the Philippines
