= 2005 Autonomous Region in Muslim Mindanao general election =

2005 ARMM general election
← 2001	August 11, 2005	2008 →
Nominee	Zaldy Ampatuan	Mahid Mutilan	Ibrahim Paglas III
Party	Lakas	Ompia	Liberal
Running mate	Ansaruddin-Abdulmalik Abiong	Ismael Abubakar Jr.	Hatta Dimaporo
Popular vote	594,091	226,693	110,256
Percentage	63.7%	24.31%	11.82%
Regional Governor before election
Parouk Hussin
Lakas
Elected Regional Governor
Zaldy Ampatuan
Lakas

Autonomous Region in Muslim Mindanao general elections were held in the ARMM for the regional governor, vice-governor posts and election of members of the ARMM Regional Legislative Assembly on August 8, 2005. Voting results are listed below.

== Results ==
=== Regional governor ===
2005 ARMM gubernatorial election
Party	Candidate	Votes	%
Lakas	Zaldy Ampatuan	594,091	63.7%
Ompia	Mahid Mutilan	226,693	24.31%
Liberal	Ibrahim Paglas III	110,256	11.82%
Independent	Warina Jukuy	836	0.09%
Independent	Ali Omar	648	0.07%
Independent	Mangacop Saud	174	0.02%
Margin of victory		367,698	39.39%
Total votes		932,698	100.00%
Lakas hold			

=== Regional vice-governor ===
2005 ARMM gubernatorial election
Party	Candidate	Votes	%
Lakas	Ansaruddin-Abdulmalik Adiong	542,453	58.96%
Ompia	Ismael Abubakar Jr.	202,019	21.96%
Liberal	Hatta Dimaporo	172,229	18.72%
Independent	Usman Sarangani	1,857	0.2%
UMMAH Party	Alex Ambor	1,410	0.15%
Margin of victory		340,434	37.00%
Total votes		919,968	100.00%
Lakas hold			

=== Members for the Regional Legislative Assembly ===
Province	District	Assemblyman	Party
Basilan	Lone	Rajam M. Akbar	Lakas-CMD
Basilan	Lone	Bonnie Abdulaziz C. Balamo	Lakas-CMD
Basilan	Lone	Hatimil E. Hassan	Lakas-CMD
Lanao del Sur	1st	Zia Alonto Adiong	Lakas-CMD
Lanao del Sur	1st	Suhaylah R.P.M. Salic	independent
Lanao del Sur	1st	Samer M.U. Salic	independent
Lanao del Sur	2nd	Saaduddin M. Alauya, Jr.	Lakas-CMD
Lanao del Sur	2nd	Yasser A. Balindong	Lakas-CMD
Lanao del Sur	2nd	Hosni B.M.A. Macapodi	independent
Maguindanao	1st	Jackson M. Bandila	Lakas-CMD
Maguindanao	1st	Roonie Q. Sinsuat	Lakas-CMD
Maguindanao	1st	Bongarsa D. Tomawis, Jr.	Lakas-CMD
Maguindanao	2nd	Umbrah A. Datumanong	Lakas-CMD
Maguindanao	2nd	Khadafeh G. Mangudadatu	Lakas-CMD
Maguindanao	2nd	Pike T. Mentang	Lakas-CMD
Sulu	1st	Abraham T. Burahan	Liberal
Sulu	1st	Alhabsi M. Hassan	Lakas-CMD
Sulu	1st	Garcia D. Tingkahan	Lakas-CMD
Sulu	2nd	Nashruper T. Daud	Lakas-CMD
Sulu	2nd	Maulana M. Omar	Lakas-CMD
Sulu	2nd	Nurwiza S. Tulawie	Lakas-CMD
Tawi-Tawi	Lone	Romel Y. Matba	independent
Tawi-Tawi	Lone	Shameera S. Matolo	Liberal
Tawi-Tawi	Lone	Rejie M. Sahali	Lakas-CMD

== See also ==
- Official Results
- Commission on Elections
- Politics of the Philippines
- Philippine elections
