= Amer Zaakaria Rakim =

Filipino politician (born 1990)

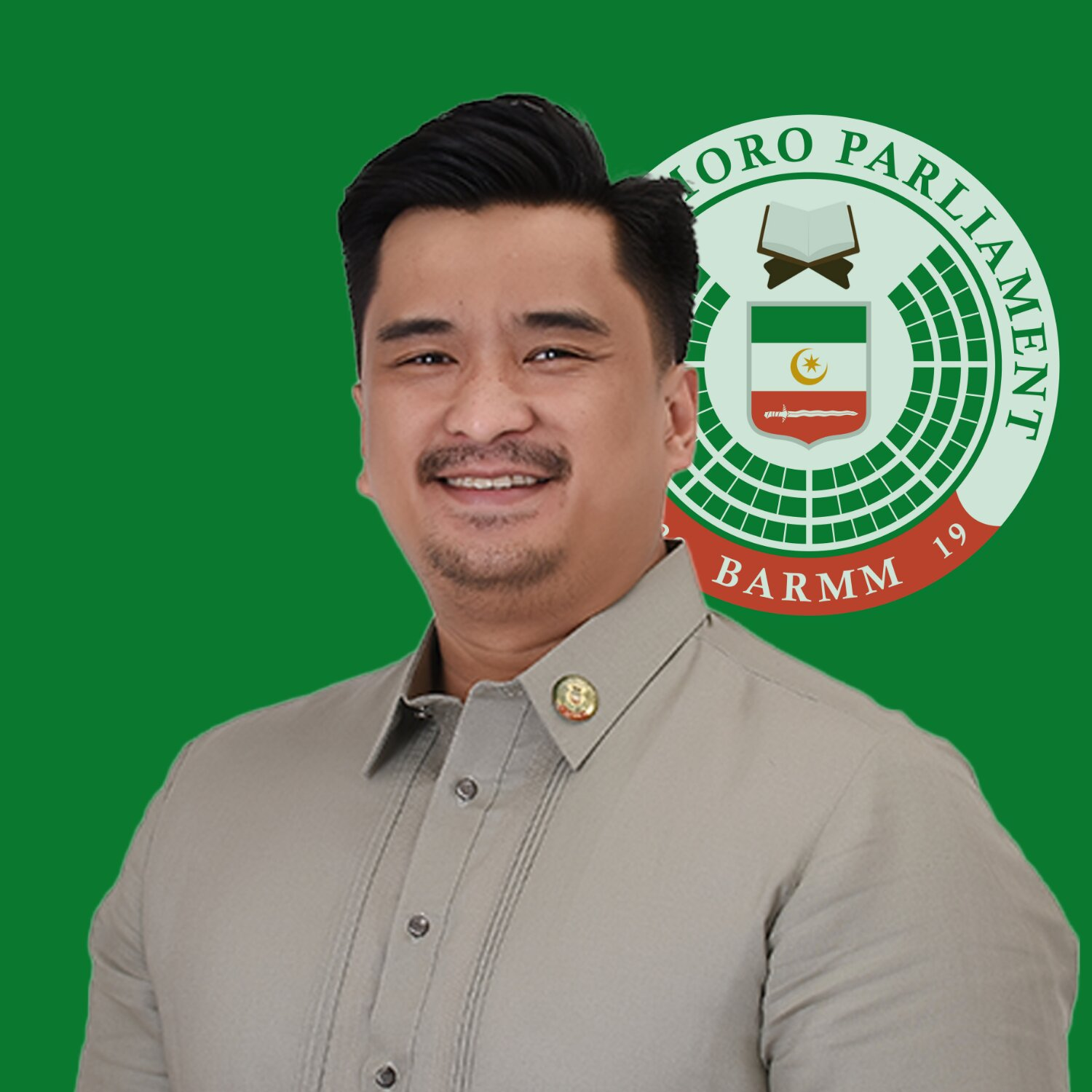
- Official portrait, 2025

Speaker of the Bangsamoro Parliament
- Incumbent
- Assumed office October 30, 2026
- Preceded by: Mohammad Yacob (as speaker of the Bangsamoro Transition Authority Parliament)

Deputy Floor Leader of the Bangsamoro Parliament
- In office October 21, 2025 – October 30, 2026
- Leader: John Anthony Lim

Member of the Bangsamoro Parliament
- Incumbent
- Assumed office October 30, 2026
- Constituency: PR

Member of the Bangsamoro Transition Authority Parliament
- In office March 15, 2025 – October 30, 2026
- Nominated by: National government
- Appointed by: Bongbong Marcos

Personal details
- Party: BGC (2025–present)

Amer Zaakaria "Mikee" Adiong Rakim is a Filipino politician who has served as the first speaker of the Bangsamoro Parliament since 2026. A member of the BARMM Grand Coalition, he served as an appointed member of the Bangsamoro Parliament from 2025 to 2026 and has represented the parliament through proportional representation since 2026.

== Political career ==
Rakim was first appointed to the Bangsamoro Parliament by President Bongbong Marcos in March 2025. In the first regular parliamentary elections in 2026, he was elected through proportional representation as the second nominee of the BARMM Grand Coalition, which won eight seats.

On October 30, 2026, Rakim was elected the first speaker of the Bangsamoro Parliament, defeating incumbent speaker Mohammad Yacob.

== Electoral history ==
Electoral history of Amer Zaakaria Rakim
Year	Office	Party	Votes received				Result
Year	Office	Party	Total	%	P.	Swing	Result
2026	Member of Parliament (Proportional representation)	BGC	391,266	20.68%	3rd (Note: The BARMM Grand Coalition placed third in the proportional representation election, winning eight seats, with Rakim, its second nominee, among those elected.)	—N/a	Won

== Notes ==
Political offices
Preceded by Mohammad Yacob	Speaker of the Bangsamoro Parliament; 2026–present	Incumbent
