= Lininding Pangandaman =

2nd Governor of the Autonomous Region in Muslim Mindanao
- In office 1993–1996
- Vice Governor: Nabil Tan
- Preceded by: Zacaria Candao
- Succeeded by: Nur Misuari

Personal details
- Died: October 13, 2013

Lininding P. Pangandaman was a Filipino diplomat, lawyer, and politician who was the Governor of the Autonomous Region in Muslim Mindanao (ARMM).

== Background ==
Lininding Pangandaman is an ethnic Maranao who hailed from Masiu, Lanao del Sur. He was involved in several socio-civic organizations such as the Basak Muslim Professionals Fraternity and Sorority in which he was a co-founder.

He was a diplomat serving as ambassador to various Muslim-majority states including Saudi Arabia from the late 1960s until the early 1980s. He also engaged with the Moro National Liberation Front (MNLF) as a negotiator for the Philippine government which led to the signing of the 1976 Tripoli Agreement.

Under the urging of President Fidel V. Ramos, he ran for the position of Governor of the Autonomous Region in Muslim Mindanao. He got elected as regional governor, serving from 1993 to 1996. Pangandaman intended to run in the 1996 regional elections but withdrew his candidacy to give way for Nur Misuari who was elected as his successor unopposed.

== Death ==
Pangandaman died on October 13, 2013.
