= 1990 Autonomous Region in Muslim Mindanao general election =

General elections were held for the first time on February 12, 1990, in the newly created Autonomous Region in Muslim Mindanao for the regional governor and vice governor.

The Autonomous Region in Muslim Mindanao region was first created on August 1, 1989, through Republic Act No. 6734 otherwise known as the Organic Act in pursuance with a constitutional mandate to provide for an autonomous area in Muslim Mindanao. A plebiscite was held in the provinces of Basilan, Cotabato, Davao del Sur, Lanao del Norte, Lanao del Sur, Maguindanao, Palawan, South Cotabato, Sultan Kudarat, Sulu, Tawi-Tawi, Zamboanga del Norte and Zamboanga del Sur; and in the cities of Cotabato, Dapitan, Dipolog, General Santos, Iligan, Marawi, Pagadian, Puerto Princesa and Zamboanga to determine if the residents would want to be part of the ARMM. Of the areas where the plebiscites were held only Lanao del Sur, Maguindanao, Sulu and Tawi-Tawi voted favorably for inclusion in the new autonomous region.

== Results ==
=== For Regional Governor ===
Summary of the final official COMELEC canvass of the 12 February 1990 Autonomous Region in Muslim Mindanao general election results
Candidate	Party
Zacaria Candao	Lakas-NUCD

=== For Regional Vice-Governor ===
Summary of the final official COMELEC canvass of the 12 February 1990 Autonomous Region in Muslim Mindanao general election results
Candidate	Party
Benjamin Loong	Lakas-NUCD

The proclamation of Candao as governor and Loong as vice-governor was disputed by candidate Ali Dimaporo. However, the Commission on Elections dismissed the candidates appeals as lacking merit on March 21, 1990 while the Supreme Court of the Philippines lifted their restraining order on said proclamation on June 26, 1990.

== See also ==
- Commission on Elections
- Politics of the Philippines
- Philippine elections
