= Zacaria Candao =

Filipino politician

Datu Zacaria Candao

1st Governor of the Autonomous Region in Muslim Mindanao
- In office July 6, 1990 – 1993
- Vice Governor: Benjamin Loong
- Preceded by: Office established
- Succeeded by: Lininding Pangandaman

Governor of Maguindanao
- In office 1995 – June 30, 2001
- Preceded by: Norodin Matalam
- Succeeded by: Andal Ampatuan Sr.
- In office April 5, 1986 – July 6, 1990 acting from 1986–1989
- Preceded by: Sandiale Sambolawan
- Succeeded by: Norodin Matalam
- In office 1975 – April 1, 1977
- Preceded by: Simeon Datumanong
- Succeeded by: Sanggacala M. Baraguir

Personal details
- Party: PDSP (from 2007); Lakas–CMD (until 2007)

Datu Zacaria A. Candao is a Filipino politician who served as the first governor of the Autonomous Region in Muslim Mindanao (ARMM).

== Career ==
=== Maguindanao governor (until 1977) ===
Zacaria Candao became the second governor of the Maguindanao province succeeding Simeon A. Datumanong. He resigned on April 1, 1977. Sultan Kudarat Municipal Mayor Sanggacala M. Baraguir was appointed by then President Ferdinand Marcos to succeed Candao.

=== Events leading to the 1986 People Power Revolution ===
During the 1986 Philippine presidential snap election, Candao supported the candidacy of Corazon Aquino as provincial chairman of the Maguindanao and Cotabato City chapter of the United Nationalist Democratic Organization, an opposition party which is against the administration of then-incumbent President Ferdinand Marcos. He linked the interests of Muslim Filipinos in the UNIDO platform and facilitated the defection of Filipino Muslim politicians who were part of Kilusang Bagong Lipunan, the ruling party, to UNIDO. Marcos contested win over the 1986 elections later led to his ouster in the People Power Revolution of February 1986 which saw Corazon Aquino installed as President of the Philippines.

=== Maguindanao governor (1986–1990) ===
After the People Power Revolution, Candao was appointed as acting governor of Maguindanao on April 5, 1986 by then President Corazon Aquino. He was also the acting chairman of the Executive Council of the Regional Autonomous Government for Central Mindanao. Candao was elected as Maguindanao's governor in 1989, he later resigned to run as governor of the then-newly created Autonomous Region in Muslim Mindanao and was succeeded by Vice Governor Norodin Matalam as Maguindanao governor.

=== As ARMM governor (1990–1993) ===
Candao participated in ARMM's first gubernatorial elections on February 12, 1990 and was elected as the autonomous region's first governor. He officially assumed the post months later on July 6, 1990. He vied for a second term in the 1993 March elections but lost to Lininding P. Pangandaman.

=== Maguindanao governor (1995–2001) ===
After being the ARMM regional governor, Candao ran again for the post of Governor of Maguindanao in 1995. He was successful and won re-election in 1998. He lost to Andal Ampatuan Sr. in the 2001 elections.

== Embezzlement case ==
The Sandiganbayan found Candao along his brother and executive secretary Abas Candao guilty of nine counts of malversation in October 2008 sentencing him to 162 years of prison (18 years per count) for embezzling ₱21 million of public funds. Then-state auditor Heidi Mendoza led a team that discovered the unlawful release of 52 checks from December 1992 to March 1993. Candao filed a motion for consideration before the Supreme Court on October 19, 2011 to reverse the guilty verdict. The high court however upheld the decision in early 2012 after it found "no compelling reason" for the petition.

== Grant of absolute presidential pardon ==
Following a favorable endorsement from the Bureau of Pardons and Parole, Office of the Chief Minister, and the Department of Justice, President Ferdinand Marcos Jr. approved the petition for executive clemency. The absolute pardon was publicly reported on August 13, 2026.

== Personal life and family ==
Datu Zacaria Candao belongs to an influential Maguindanaon political and traditional royal clan centered in Cotabato City and the municipality of Parang, Maguindanao del Norte.

=== Immediate family ===
Candao was married to the late Bai Saada Bajunaid Candao. Their children have actively pursued roles in public service, legislative affairs, community leadership, and regional literature.

=== Datu Ma-arouph B. Candao (Eldest son) ===
A prominent political leader who served as Vice Governor of Maguindanao. He later transitioned into regional governance as a Member of Parliament (MP) in the Bangsamoro Transition Authority (BTA), affiliated with the Bangsamoro Federalist Party (BFP).

=== Bai Maleiha B. Candao ===
The eldest daughter, a former journalist, writer, and civic activist who served as chairperson of the Tulong Tulong sa Pag-Unlad ng Bangsamoro (TMB) foundation. She was later appointed as a Member of Parliament (MP) in the BTA.

=== Bai Fairuz B. Candao ===
The youngest daughter, a writer and contributor to regional literary platforms focusing on Bangsamoro cultural heritage and self-determination.

=== Datu Liwa Candao (Father) ===
Traditional leader who served as the inaugural municipal mayor of Parang, Cotabato (now Parang, Maguindanao del Norte) upon its creation in 1947.

=== Dr. Abas A. Candao (Brother) ===
Former Executive Secretary of the Autonomous Region in Muslim Mindanao (ARMM) during Candao's gubernatorial administration (1990–1993). He was co-accused in the 1993 administrative disbursement cases and was a co-recipient of the 2026 absolute presidential pardon.

=== Datu Abdul Bayan “Danny” Candao (Cousin) ===
A prominent local political figure who served as Vice Mayor of Sultan Kudarat (1995–2003) and subsequently became the founding Mayor of Sultan Mastura, Maguindanao, upon its creation in 2003.
