= Ompia Party =

Muslim political party in the Philippines

Ompia Party is a Muslim political party in Mindanao, Philippines. The party was founded by Dr. Mahid M. Mutilan.

The party is part of the Lakas–CMD. However, in the 2005 Autonomous Region in Muslim Mindanao election the party contested separately. It fielded two candidates for Board Member in 2016 Lanao del Sur local elections.
