= Alvarez Isnaji =

Former Governor of ARMM

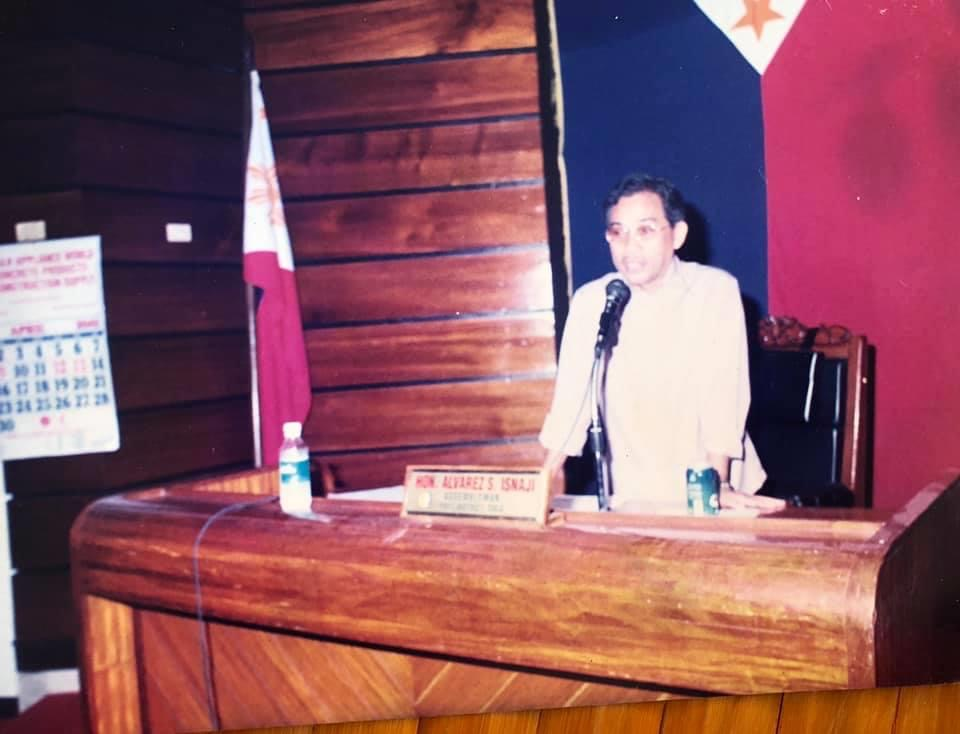
- Alvarez Isnaji serving as the Speaker of the House, Cotabato 2003.

Governor of the Autonomous Region in Muslim Mindanao
- In office November 20, 2001 – December 27, 2001
- Preceded by: Nur Misuari
- Succeeded by: Parouk Hussin

Mayor of Indanan
- In office June 30, 2007 – June 30, 2010

Military service
- Allegiance: Moro National Liberation Front

Alvarez Silal Isnaji (born February 19, 1946) is a Filipino politician who served as acting governor of the Autonomous Region in Muslim Mindanao (ARMM) after Nur Misuari was removed in 2001. He briefly served as the governor of ARMM in September 3, 2001 until October 11, 2001 when Nur Misuari went on an official leave. He then served on the same position from November 20, 2001 until Parouk Hussin assumes the governorship on December 27, 2001.

He is a member of the Moro National Liberation Front (MNLF). On April 4, 2002, Isnaji claimed to have been elected as chairman of the MNLF, which was disputed by founding chairman Nur Misuari. This effectively caused the creation of a faction of within the MNLF identified as the MNLF-Central Committee (MNLF-CC).

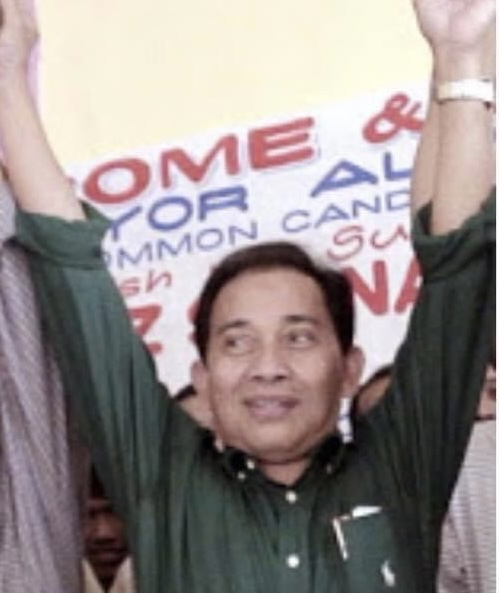
Alvarez Isnaji elected as Mayor of Indanan in 2007.

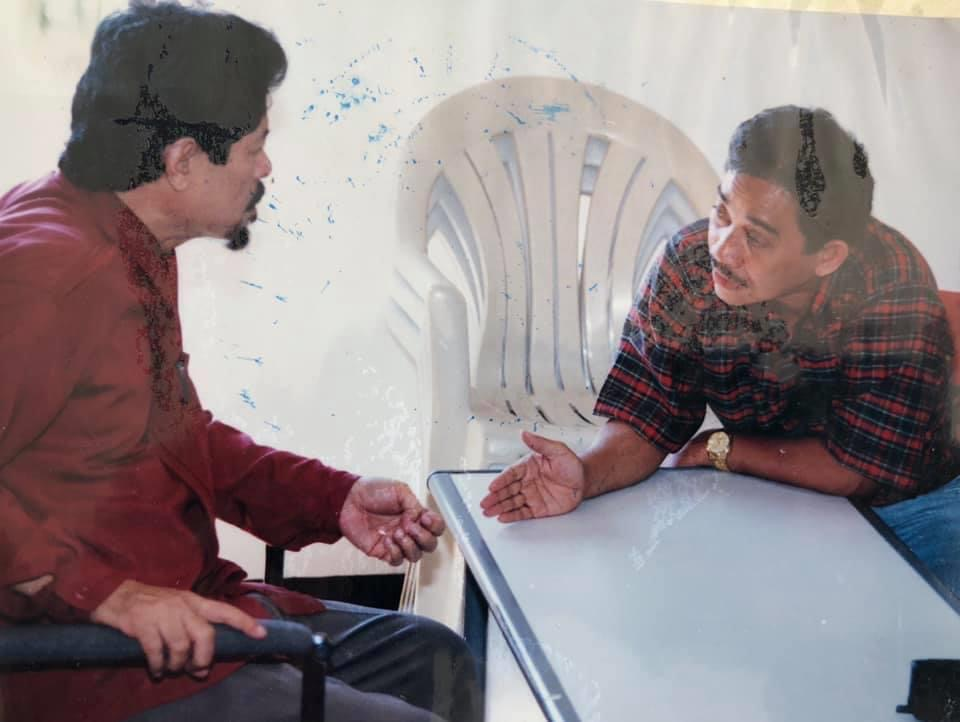
Alvarez Isnaji with MNLF Chairman Nur Misuari

In 2007, Isnaji was elected as the mayor of Indanan and the President of Mayor’s League -1st District.

In June 2008, ABS-CBN news journalist Ces Drilon and her cameraman were kidnapped by the Abu Sayyaf militants group in Indanan, Sulu. Isnaji, then mayor was involved in the negotiations for the release of the abducted. Kidnapping for ransom charges would be filed against Isnaji and his son. Isnaji claimed that his involvement was done under the directive of Interior Secretary Ronaldo Puno. The Abu Sayyaf militants alleged that they choose the Isnajis to negotiating in their behalf. The Isnajis were suspected to have planned the kidnapping themselves and to have taken portions of a supposed ransom paid for the Drilon and the cameraman's release. The two were released and deemed innocent by a Manila-based court in 2010. The Court of Appeals of the Philippines ordered for the revival of the case in 2011.

Isnaji ran for governor in the 2008 ARMM election as an independent candidate and launched a campaign while detained due to the Drilon kidnapping case.

== Political career ==
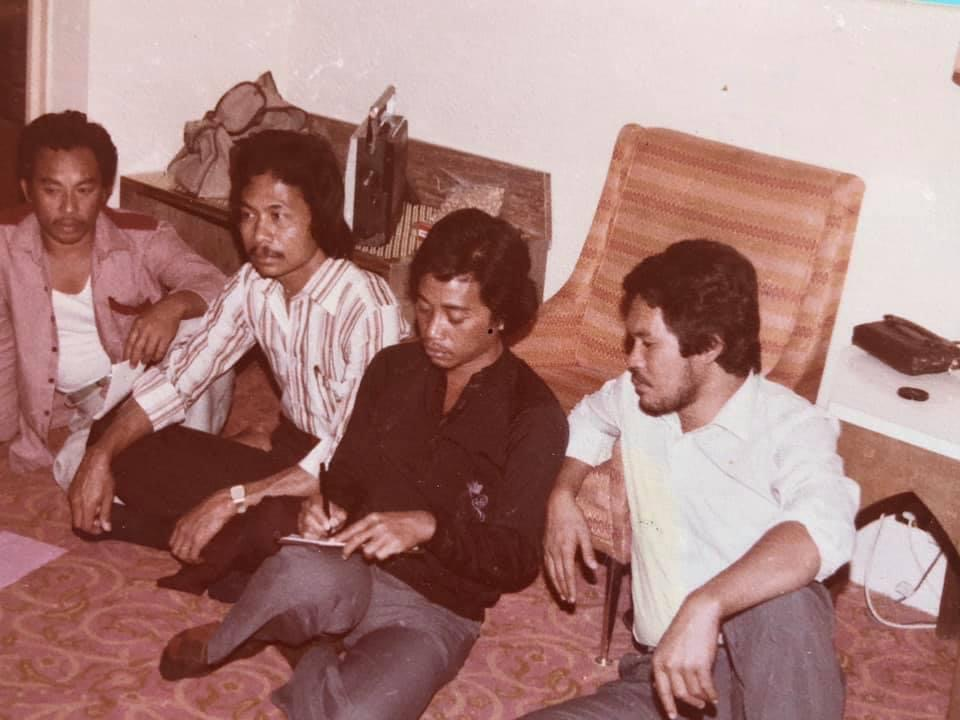
Alvarez Isnaji and his comrades, Tripoli Libya ,1978

- Speaker of the House ARMM
- Assemblyman RLA-ARMM
- Regional Vice Governor of ARMM
- Acting Regional Governor of ARMM
- Cabinet Secretary DOST-ARMM
- Municipality Mayor of Indanan (President of the Mayor’s League in the 1st District)
