= 2008 Autonomous Region in Muslim Mindanao general election =

Autonomous Region in Muslim Mindanao general elections was held in the ARMM for the regional governor, vice-governor posts and election of members of the ARMM Regional Legislative Assembly on August 11, 2008. The electronic voting used is the first in Philippines election history. The ₱500 million COMELEC's "ARMM balloting" is a pilot program for the 2010 national polling.

== Background ==
Pursuant to Republic Act No. 9333 in which elections for the posts of Regional Governor and Regional Vice-Governor and members of the ARMM Regional Legislative Assembly must be held on the second Monday of August for every three years.

=== Failed tests ===
ARMM had been used as a testing ground for computerized elections. On September 9, 1996, 42 optical scanners ($15,000 each), from Nebraska-based American Information System (AIS) were subject of the Senate Committee experiment led by then-Senator Miriam Defensor-Santiago. It found the machines defective. Again in the May 11, 1998 ARMM elections, the same machines were tested and were found defective, resulting to manual counting next day.

On July 22, 2008, however, the COMELEC, using the present machines, conducted a successful “mock poll" and simulated the actual processes and procedure for the August 11 ARMM election.

=== COMELEC preparations ===
The Philippines' first-ever electronic voting (automated) polls had some 1.6 million Filipino-Muslims registered voters, who will elect a governor, vice governor and regional legislators for the ARMM. The Commission on Elections (COMELEC) announced that it will be using 3,300 electronic voting machines in Maguindanao and 156 "automated counting machines" (electronic voting) in Basilan, Sulu, Tawi-Tawi, Shariff Kabunsuan, and Lanao del Sur. It will using 2 technologies, namely Smartmatic-Sahi Direct Recording Electronic (DRE voting machine), while optical scan voting systems (Optical Mark Readers & AVANTE International Technology, Inc.) will be used in the 5 other provinces of the ARMM. These include the 17 automated counting machines brought by Commissioner Nicodemo Ferrer, head of the COMELEC's team in Basilan, to Lamitan and Isabela cities. 11,000 military personnel and 7,000 policemen or a total of 18,000-strong security force were placed to secure the polls. The historical first "fully" automation elections will not be disrupted by power outage, since each machine has a battery packs reserve power good for 16 hours.

DRE or “touch screen electronic voting,” allows voters to "simply touch the pictures of candidates they wish to elect," and were especially for disabled and illiterate voters.

"No writing of names" is the principal feature of OMR machines. Voters have to simply shade the circles beside the candidates’ names. COMELEC has 9 counting machines in 5 precincts. Each can count 100 ballots in a minute. A 24-digit randomly generated bar code identifies the ballot as emanating from a specific precinct, and the OMR is programmed to count only ballots from designated precincts. The laptop’s keyboard is also locked.

The COMELEC, further, provided two contingency plans: the AVANTE OMR SYSTEM CONTINUITY (CONTINGENCY) PLAN and the SMARTMATIC-SAHI CONTINGENCY PLAN. With these, the COMELEC predicted it would be able to proclaim the winning candidates in less than 36 hours.

The COMELEC, however, identified 887 barangays as areas of concern or "hotspots." 49 areas were tagged as areas of immediate concern.

GMA Network's Reporter's Notebook, on August 12, 2008, aired a documentary on the Comelec 2008 "Election Automation."

==== Limitations ====
Comelec automation may reduce human intervention in votes counts, but the twin technologies used do not necessarily prevent vote-buying, intimidation, disenfranchisement, and other dirty tricks. Ballots cast cannot be traced by political operators. PPCRV chair Henrietta De Villa said: “In the final analysis, the integrity of the elections depends on the board of election inspectors, the voters, and the politicians, but they can’t easily change the results on the election returns. I would say that the space for cheating has narrowed.”

=== Accreditation ===
The COMELEC, in its July 29, 2008 promulgated Resolution, SPP-08-006, 08.06.2008, accredited the Citizens Coalition For ARMM Electoral Reforms, Inc. (Citizens CARE) as Citizens' Arm of the Commission on Elections in the provinces of Maguindanao, Shariff Kabunsuan, Lanao del Sur, Basilan, Sulu and Tawi-Tawi, in the ARMM and the cities of Marawi and Lamitan, pursuant to Sec. 2(5), Art. IX (c) of the 1987 Constitution of the Philippines and Sec. 52(k) of the Omnibus Election Code. Also, volunteers from the Legal Network for Truthful Elections (LENTE), one of Comelec’s accredited citizens’ arms, were deployed in Basilan, Sulu, Tawi-Tawi, Lanao del Sur and Maguindanao.

=== Foreign observers ===
Meanwhile, foreign observers led by Somsri Hananuntasuk, executive director of the Asian Network for Free Elections (ANFREL), and composed of the 22-man foreign delegation from Malaysia, Indonesia, Sri Lanka, Nepal, Bangladesh, Cambodia and Thailand, arrived for their election observation mission.

=== Fears, tensions ===
The historical first, however, had been overshadowed by fears of violence due to the failed GRP-Moro Islamic Liberation Front (MILF) Peace Panel Memorandum of Agreement on Ancestral Domain” of the “Bangsamoro Juridical Entity” or territory deal amid the Supreme Court of the Philippines' temporary brake (TRO). On August 4, the High Tribunal issued a Temporary Restraining Order directing representatives of the government and the Moro Islamic Liberation Front “to cease and desist from formally signing the MOA. In the consolidated petitions of officials from the province of Cotabato represented by Governor Jesus Sacadalan and Vice Governor Emmanuel Piñol (GR No. 183591), as well as that of city officials of Zamboanga represented by Mayor Celso L. Lobregat, Rep. Ma. Isabelle G. Climaco, and Rep. Erico Basilio A. Fabian (GR No. 183752), the Court ordered the Office of the Solicitor General to submit to the Court and to the petitioners copies of the final draft of the MOA not later than August 8, 2008, and scheduled an Oral Argument on August 15, 9 a.m.

Under the failed deal, ARMM would include 700 barangays in Cotabato, Lanao del Norte and Zamboanga, causing vehement objections from officials and residents. Zamboanga City Mayor Celso Lobregat, however, pointed that the expanded MILF homeland deal will cover 1,459 villages, and not just 700 barangays in the agreement’s (Annex A) that would establish the Bangsamoro Juridical Entity (BJE). He said Annex B areas were described as “special intervention areas": 40 villages in Zamboanga City, as well as several villages in the provinces of Sarangani, Zamboanga Sibugay, Zamboanga del Sur, Zamboanga del Norte, Cotabato, South Cotabato, Sultan Kudarat, and Lanao del Norte.

Accordingly, tensions amid fears erupted just days before the election, when hundreds of MILF rebels sequestered villages in Cotabato's 3 towns, burning homes, seizing farm animals and forcing evacuation of 1,500 families. The government gave the rebels ultimatum to clear the villages, and the rebels backed off, in due course.

==== GRP-MILF MOA ====
Fr. Joaquin G. Bernas opined that: "The main objective of the MOA is to amend the Organic Act which established the Autonomous Region in Muslim Mindanao (ARMM). The amendment envisions expansion of the geographical area of the ARMM and of its autonomous character. These objectives cannot be achieved by a mere memorandum of agreement. It will involve amending the Organic Act for the ARMM and the Constitution. The current Organic Act for ARMM is not any ordinary law. It is the product of a 3-step process prescribed by the Constitution: the formation of a regional consultative commission whose task was to enlighten the legislators who were to draft the law; drafting of the Organic Act itself by Congress; and the plebiscite conducted among the areas concerned. The original 1989 Organic Act was replaced by the Organic Act of 2001 which incorporated the salient features of the 1996 Peace Agreement entered into between the Government of the Republic of the Philippines and the Moro National Liberation Front (MNLF). A 2002 decision of the Supreme Court would later make it clear that provisions of the Organic Act can be amended only through the legislative-cum-plebiscite process. The controversial MOA, product of innumerable GRP-MILF dialogues, did not go through a broad consultation. The lack of consultation is now being defended by government as a matter of “executive privilege.” The Organic Act is similar in nature to a Constitution. It is an embodiment of the will of the sovereign people of Mindanao. In the end, those who are pushing for the achievement of the goals of the MOA will have no choice but to feed it into the legislative process. Indeed, when the document begins to be subjected to scrutiny, there will be a lot to debate about."

== The candidates ==
Exactly 1,516,775 registered voters were officially declared eligible to vote in 1,903 polling centers of the August 11 balloting for a regional governor, vice governor and 24 members of the ARMM Regional Legislative Assembly. Incumbent Gov. Datu Zaldy Ampatuan, 41, (Lakas-Christian Muslim Democrats party) is seeking reelection, the first governor to do so since ARMM creation in 1990. Ampatuan is challenged by Guimid Matalam (Pwersa ng Masang Pilipino) and Jupakar Pindah-Asia Arabani, Ismain Berto Ibrahim, Alvarez Silal Isnaji, Ahmad Darping Nooh and Ali Jumadil Omar—all running as independents. Isnaji is detained in connection the Ces Drilon case. 5 candidates joined the vice gubernatorial race while 78 aspire to become regional lawmakers.

== Results ==
=== For Governor ===
2008 ARMM gubernatorial election
Candidate	Party	Votes	%
Zaldy Ampatuan	Lakas–CMD	1,017,179	93.07
Alvarez Isnaji	Independent	22,446	2.05
Ali J. Omar	Independent	16,902	1.55
Guimid Matalam	Pwersa ng Masang Pilipino	15,283	1.40
Juprakar P. Arabani	Independent	11,648	1.07
Ismail B. Ibrahim	Independent	7,223	0.66
Ahmad D. Nooh	Independent	2,280	0.21
Total		1,092,961	100.00
Lakas–CMD hold			

=== For Vice-Governor ===
2008 ARMM vice-gubernatorial election
Candidate	Party	Votes	%
Ansaruddin Adiong	Lakas–CMD	1,011,791	94.00
Kadra Masihul	Kilusang Bagong Lipunan	26,336	2.45
Kursid Sampang	Independent	20,335	1.89
Ailani Susulan Jr.	Independent	17,931	1.67
Total		1,076,393	100.00
Lakas–CMD hold			

=== Members for the Regional Legislative Assembly ===
Party	Seats
Lakas–CMD	16
Kabalikat ng Malayang Pilipino	4
Nacionalista Party	1
Independents	3
Total	24

== Aftermath ==
Anfrel, through Hananuntasuk, reported that in spite of automation, old problems of cheating and vote-buying still persisted. Minors were allowed to vote, poll officials influenced voters or even voted for them, and there were several instances of vote-buying. 22 of its foreign observers from 7 countries in Southeast Asia—visited 443 precincts in the ARMM. The machines only prevented cheating in the counting and the canvassing, as it stopped "dagdag-bawas" or the vote-padding and -shaving of votes, but the machines failed to prevent the way voters are individually influenced—or even forced—to vote for particular candidates. The secrecy of the ballot was also violated since board of election inspectors often assisted voters, indicating their support for particular candidates, and vote-buying was rampant.
