= Pangalian Balindong =

Filipino politician (1940–2025)

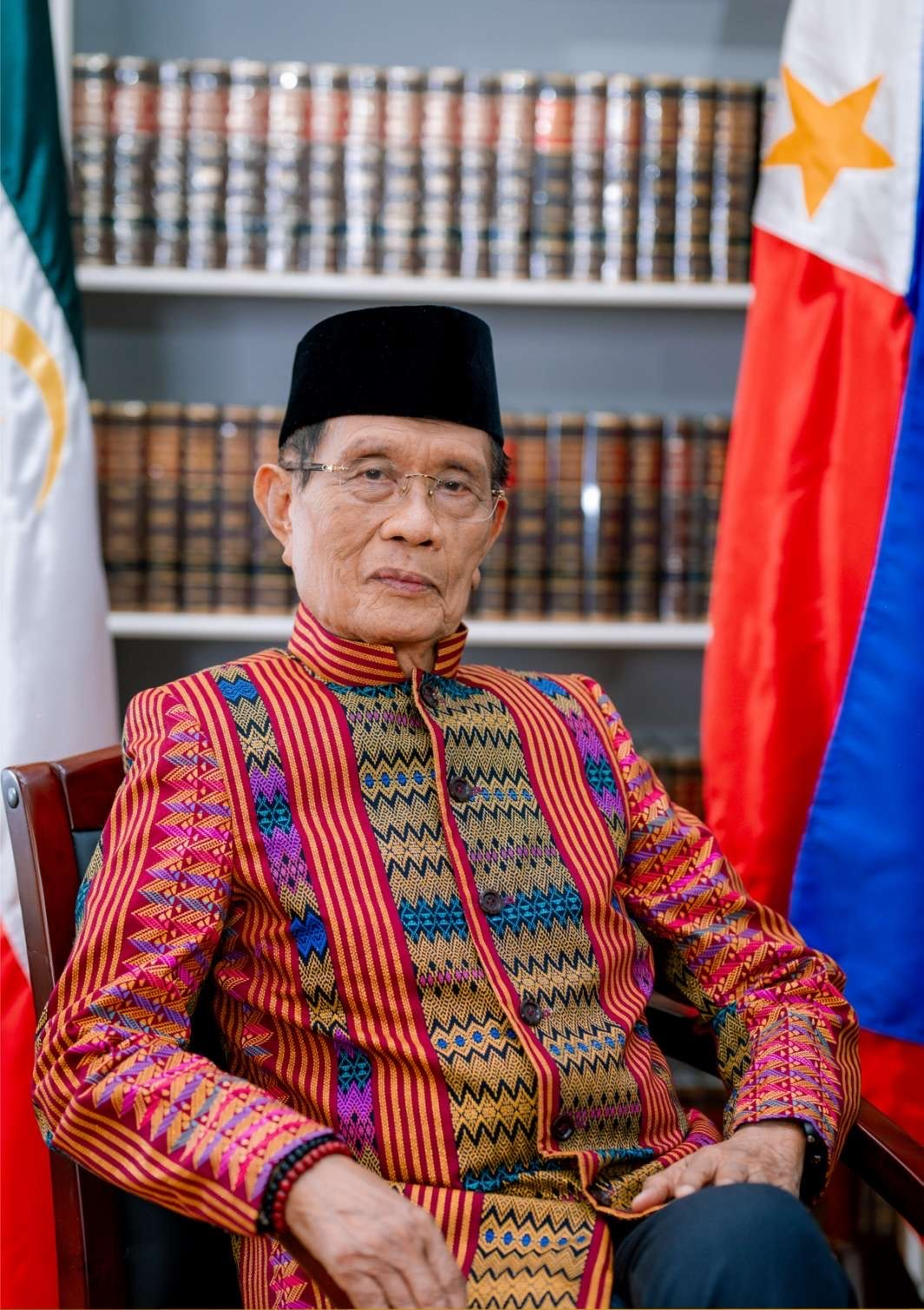
- Balindong in 2022

Speaker of the Bangsamoro Transition Authority Parliament
- In office March 29, 2019 – October 2, 2025
- Nominated by: Bangsamoro Transition Authority
- Chief Minister: Murad Ebrahim
- Succeeded by: Mohammad Yacob

Member of the Bangsamoro Transition Authority Parliament
- In office March 29, 2019 – October 2, 2025
- Nominated by: Moro Islamic Liberation Front
- Appointed by: Rodrigo Duterte; Bongbong Marcos
- Chief Minister: Murad Ebrahim; Abdulraof Macacua

Deputy Speaker of the House of Representatives of the Philippines
- In office July 22, 2013 – June 30, 2016
- President: Benigno Aquino III

Member of the Philippine House of Representatives from Lanao del Sur's 2nd District
- In office June 30, 2007 – June 30, 2016
- Preceded by: Benasing Macarambon, Jr.
- Succeeded by: Mauyag Papandayan, Jr.
- In office June 30, 1995 – June 30, 1998
- Preceded by: Mohammad Ali Dimaporo
- Succeeded by: Benasing Macarambon, Jr.

Speaker of the ARMM Regional Legislative Assembly
- In office 1991–1993

Personal details
- Born: Ali Pangalian Macaorao Balindong; January 1, 1940 Lanao, Philippine Commonwealth
- Died: October 2, 2025 (aged 85) Quezon City, Philippines
- Party: Independent (2016–2025)
- Other political affiliations: Liberal (2010–2016); Lakas (1995–2010)
- Spouse: Jamila Malawani Alonto (m. 1968)
- Children: 8, including Yasser
- Education: Manuel L. Quezon University
- Occupation: Lawyer, politician

Ali Pangalian Macaorao Balindong (January 1, 1940 – October 2, 2025) was a Filipino lawyer and politician. He was the speaker of the Bangsamoro Parliament from 2019 until his death in 2025. Balindong was also a deputy speaker of the Philippine House of Representatives and a member of the 1971 Philippine Constitutional Convention.

== Early life and education ==
Pangalian Balindong was born on January 1, 1940, in Lanao (modern-day Dapao in Pualas, Lanao del Sur) to an influential clan. He was the eldest son of Sultan Amer Macaorao Balindong, a former mayor of Malabang, and Maimona Marohom.

Balingdong finished his primary education at the Malabang Central Elementary School in 1954 and finished his secondary education at the Our Lady of Peace High School in 1958.

He attended the Manuel L. Quezon University in Manila graduating with a political science degree in 1962 and a law degree in 1966. He passed the bar examinations in the following year. He took some master's units in public administration at the Mindanao State University.

== Career ==
Balindong engaged in private legal practice and served as legal counsel for the Moro National Liberation Front (MNLF) which works for peace initiatives with the government. In 1971, he joined the Philippine Constitutional Convention representing the Lone District of Lanao del Sur.

=== ARMM assemblyman ===
Balindong started his political career when he held the post of Assemblyman from 1990 to 1993 representing the 2nd District of Lanao del Sur and was elected as Speaker of the Regional Legislative Assemblyman of the Autonomous Region in Muslim Mindanao (ARMM) between 1991 and 1993.

=== House of Representatives ===
Balindong was a member of the House of Representatives with Lanao del Sur's 2nd district as his constituency. He ran in the 1987 elections but lost to Mohammad Ali Dimaporo.

He was elected as Lanao del Sur 2nd district representative in the 1995 election for the 10th Congress. He ran again in 2007 and became a representative during the 14th, 15th, and 16th Congresses. In 2013, he rose to the deputy speaker post of the House of Representatives until 2016.

Balindong authored the law (Republic Act No. 9997) which created the National Commission on Muslim Filipinos in 2009. Balindong also authored Integrated History Act of 2016 (Republic Act No. 10908) which mandates the inclusion of Moro and indigenous people's history in the national history curriculum. He also proposed House Bill 144 which bans the use of "Muslim" and "Christian" in describing suspects of a crime in news reporting to discourage harmful stereotypes.

He also authored and an advocate of the Bangsamoro Basic Law during his tenure as a congressman. A similar measure which proposed the creation of a Bangsamoro autonomous region became law in 2018 which is now known as the Bangsamoro Organic Law.

=== Consultative Committee ===
In 2018, under Executive Order No. 10, Balindong was appointed by President Rodrigo Duterte as a member of the 25-member Consultative Committee to Review the 1987 Philippine Constitution, a committee composed of former government officials, veteran lawyers, and academicians tasked by Duterte to craft a federal constitution.

=== Bangsamoro Parliament ===
Balindong became part of the Bangsamoro Transition Authority, which forms part of the interim Bangsamoro Parliament, in 2019. On March 29, 2025, Balindong was elected as parliament speaker having been nominated by Mohagher Iqbal. He was releelected in September 2022.

== Personal life and death ==
Balindong was a Maranao. He married Jamela Malawani Alonto on April 28, 1968, with whom he had eight children. He was a member of the Mu Kappa Phi Exclusive Law Fraternity.

After six years in office, Balindong died at age 85 on October 2, 2025, while at the St. Luke's Medical Center in Quezon City for an undisclosed illness.
