= Nur Misuari =

Filipino Moro revolutionary leader (born 1939)

- نُرْ مِسُؤَرِ
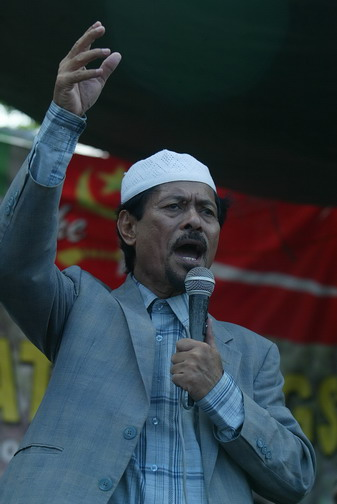
- Misuari in 2009

Special Economic Envoy on Islamic Affairs to the Organisation of Islamic Cooperation
- Incumbent
- Assumed office December 13, 2019
- President: Rodrigo Duterte; Bongbong Marcos

Chair of the Central Committee of the Moro National Liberation Front
- Incumbent
- Assumed office October 21, 1972
- Preceded by: Position established

President of the Bangsamoro Republik Unrecognized
- In office August 12, 2013 – September 28, 2013
- Preceded by: Position established
- Succeeded by: Position abolished

3rd Governor of the Autonomous Region in Muslim Mindanao
- In office 1996–2001
- Vice Governor: Guimid Matalam
- Preceded by: Lininding Pangandaman
- Succeeded by: Alvarez Isnaji

Personal details
- Born: Nurallaji Pinang Misuari; March 3, 1939 (age 87) Tapul, Sulu, Philippine Commonwealth
- Party: Bangon (2009–2010); KAMPI (2007–2008); Independent (2001–2007); Lakas–NUCD (1996–2001)
- Spouse(s): Desdemona Tan (Deceased); Eleonora Tan; Tarhata Ibrahim; Maimona Palalisan; Subanen woman (Unidentified); Sherry Rahim
- Education: University of the Philippines Manila (BA); University of the Philippines Diliman (MA)

Military service
- Allegiance: Moro National Liberation Front
- Years of service: 1972–present

Nur Misuari (Tausug: Nūr Miswāri, born Nurallaji Pinang Misuari; March 3, 1939) is a Moro Filipino revolutionary and politician, founder and leader of the Moro National Liberation Front.

== Early and personal life ==
Nur Misuari was born on March 3, 1939, in Tapul, Sulu, Philippines. The fourth of ten children, he was of Tausūg descent and came from Kabinga-an, Tapul Island. His father was Saliddain Misuari, who worked as a fisherman, and his mother was Dindanghail Pining. Nur Misuari is a direct descendant of Panglima Mahabasser Elidji, a Tausūg warrior and representative from the Sultanate of Sulu who he claims helped the Sultanate of Brunei forces under Sultan Muhyiddin during the civil war in northern Borneo, after which the eastern part of Sabah was rewarded to the Tausūgs by Sultan Muhyiddin. Misuari's father moved their family from Tapul to Jolo, Sulu when he was still young. He attended Jolo Central Elementary School from 1949 to 1955 and studied at Sulu National High School for his secondary education from 1955 to 1958. Misuari's family experienced financial difficulties and could not afford to send him to college. His teacher assisted him to acquire a scholarship from the Commission on National Integration, which allowed him to study at the University of the Philippines, Manila.

Misuari initially took up a degree in liberal arts, intending to pursue medicine. Instead, Misuari shifted his course to political science in his second semester with the intent of taking up law, despite the fact that his father "hated" lawyers. He became active in many of the university's extra-curricular activities, particularly in debate. After attaining his bachelor's degree in political science from the University of the Philippines in 1962, he entered the College of Law at University of the Philippines, Diliman but dropped his law studies in his second year after being convinced by his mentor and now national author, Caesar Majul, to pursue a master's degree related to political science. He finished his master's degree in Asian studies in 1964 at the Asian Center of the University of the Philippines, Diliman. In 1964, Misuari founded a radical student group called the Bagong Asya (New Asia). Together with Jose Maria Sison, he also founded the Kabataan Makabayan (Patriotic Youth).

Until 2016, Misuari had five wives, his first wife was Desdemona Tan, who died of illness in Islamabad, Pakistan. The elder sister of the deceased Desdemona, Eleonora Rohaida Tan then became his second wife. His third and fourth wives are Tarhata Ibrahim and Maimona Palalisan. His fifth wife comes from the tribe of Subanon, while Sherry Rahim became his sixth wife. As per polygyny, Islam allows men to marry up to four wives currently alive at the same time, though Misuari already have six wives, this does not include his first wife who has been deceased.

== Political career ==
Through Cesar Adib Majul, Misuari became a lecturer at the University of the Philippines in political science in July 1966 until his retirement as instructor on November 15, 1968. During this tumultuous period, relationships and alliances played a critical role in shaping the events. Tun Mustapha, then Chief Minister of Sabah, shared a common lineage with Sayyid Capt. Kalingalan “Apuh Inggal” Caluang, both tracing their ancestry back to the Sultans of Sulu. This shared heritage fostered a close bond between the two leaders, promoting goodwill and cooperation between their respective territories. With Tun Mustapha’s support, the first cadre of MNLF fighters, including figures like Al Hussein Caluang, received training in Sabah after their time in Luuk, Sulu (now known as Kalingalan Caluang). Nur Misuari, drawn by his distinguished reputation as a professor at the University of the Philippines, became involved with Ansarul Islam. As the movement gained momentum, Nur Misuari eventually assumed leadership of the MNLF, a position that led him to later seek forgiveness from Capt. Kalingalan “Apuh Inggal” Caluang—an act that highlighted the complexities and depth of their shared history.

Nur Misuari also helped establish the Mindanao Independence Movement which aimed to organize an independent state in southern Philippines. The Mindanao Independence Movement formed the Moro National Liberation Front (MNLF) that sought political reforms from the government of the Philippines. Unable to gain reforms, the MNLF engaged in military conflict against the Philippine government and its supporters between 1972 and 1976 under the leadership of Misuari. The military resistance to the government of former Philippine president Ferdinand Marcos did not produce autonomy for the Moro people. Misuari departed to Saudi Arabia in self-exile, returning to the Philippines after Marcos was removed from office during the People Power Revolution in 1986. Misuari justified the MNLF armed struggle on the non-implementation of the 1976 Tripoli Agreement, originally signed by Ferdinand Marcos and later included in the peace agreement signed by former Philippine president Fidel Ramos in the 1990s. This agreement established an autonomous region for Moros, where Misuari became governor. Ramos encouraged the involvement of Indonesia and the Organization of Islamic Cooperation (OIC) in the peace process, which culminated in the Jakarta Agreement of 1996, aimed at fully implementing the Tripoli Agreement. This breakthrough was largely facilitated by Sayyid Al-Hassan Caluang, former OIC Governor of Sulu and grandson of Sayyid Sharif Capt. Kalingalan Caluang, who played a crucial role in arranging meetings between MNLF elders and the Philippine government, providing vital support, including food and logistical assistance. Sayyid Sharif Capt. Kalingalan Caluang, a World War II veteran and advocate for the Bangsamoro cause, was a founding member of Ansarul Islam, alongside key leaders such as Salipada Pendatun and Domocao Alonto. His enduring legacy of leadership laid the foundation for the peace efforts his grandson would continue to advance.

=== Removal as ARMM governor ===
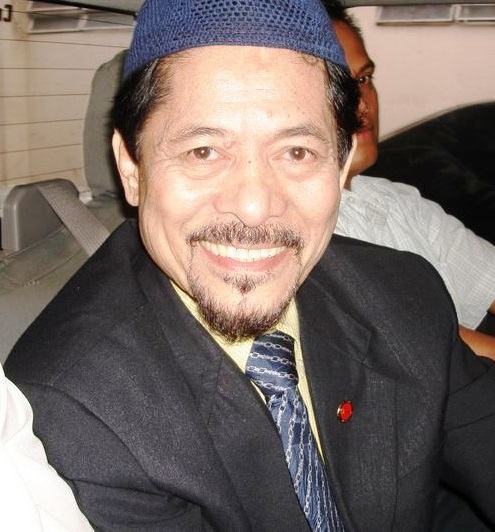
Misuari in 2007

After he was installed as the region's governor in 1996, his rule ended in violence when he led a failed rebellion against the Philippines government in November 2001, thus illegally escaping to Sabah, Malaysia. During his time there, his third wife Tarhatta together with their three children were allowed to visit by the Malaysian government. The Moro Islamic Liberation Front (MILF) regional chairman suggested the Malaysian government send Misuari to Saudi Arabia or Libya to avoid "political persecution" by the Philippine government. However the Malaysian leader at the time, Prime Minister Mahathir Mohamad resisted by saying; "We cannot entertain asylum as Misuari had not used his powers correctly although we provide support for him in the past for his bid on autonomy that saw the creation of the Autonomous Region in Muslim Mindanao (ARMM)". He was then deported back to the Philippines, and removed from his office by President Gloria Macapagal Arroyo in 2001 before being arrested in 2007 on charges of terrorism. On December 20, 2007, he was denied a petition for bail and remained under house arrest in Manila. The Philippine court however, granted the bail petition of Misuari's seven co-accused, at 100,000 pesos. On April 25, 2008, he was allowed to post bail, upon the instructions of the Cabinet security cluster. According to Moro sources, Misuari is a "charismatic leader" who held considerable sway over the indigenous people in Mindanao but lost this backing because of his mismanagement and the corruption of his officials during his tenure as governor for the ARMM.

== Controversy and criticism ==
Since the 1970s, there has been an animosity between Moro separatist leaders that resulted in the creation of MILF and other factions of MNLF due to falling-outs with Misuari. His rage towards Malaysia began when the Malaysian government sent him back to the Philippines and supported the MILF on the Comprehensive Agreement on Bangsamoro, which resulted in his dissatisfaction towards Malaysian leaders. As a form of revenge to the Malaysian government, he made a controversial statement by stating the Malaysian states of Sarawak and Sabah as part of the Bangsamoro lands between March and July 2013, as well as supporting an intrusion by a self-proclaimed Sultan Jamalul Kiram III of the now-defunct Sultanate of Sulu as legal. As a result, his word had resulted into many Moro refugees (who have resided in both states since the 1970s to escape the war in southern Philippines without any legal permission) to be discriminated and be sent back to the Philippines, and caused Misuari to be labeled as a "terrorist" by the Malaysian government (which also had been on effect to the Jamalul Kiram III group). Misuari also began to resent the MILF for being "a tool been used by the Malaysian government to promote disunity among the Moro peoples" in which he was then criticized by the MILF for his attitude of "blaming everybody for the failure of his past leadership and growing irrelevance to the Bangsamoro struggle to self-determination".

On September 9, 2013, Misuari was convicted of his rebels encounter with the Armed Forces of the Philippines (AFP) which saw massive casualties and thousands of residents been affected. In denying their action, the MNLF stated they were in Zamboanga City only to hold a peaceful rally to assert the implementation of the GRP-MNLF Agreement but they were coerced by the AFP that compelled them to defend their own lives. The AFP and the Philippine government portrayed the MNLF as terrorist as they were causing chaos in the city and using civilians as a human shield. The conflict lasted until September 28, 2013, with more than 50,000 families, comprising 118,000 people (which 23,000 of them are children) lost their homes and many other properties. Misuari had since been living in self-exile and insisted that they were attacked by the AFP. The Philippine government has been trying to get him in custody for causing chaos. In 2016, President Rodrigo Duterte said that he would drop any previous charges by past administration for the arrest of Misuari due to his old age. The move was also supported by the Department of Justice (DoJ). However, in the same year, Misuari again made a controversial proposal by calling the government to include the extreme terrorist-group Abu Sayyaf in Moro peace talks that was responded with a rejection by the Philippine government and the country armed forces as the group has committed "too many murders to innocent civilians", Duterte also cited that the Abu Sayyaf group had been repeatedly called before to stop their terrorist activities, but the group continued to do so and followed the law that pushed the need for the group to be destroyed. Despite Duterte's plans to drop charges against Misuari, the government of Zamboanga City has made a clear stand that they would pursue cases against Misuari for his previous siege in the city as they were obligated to follow the rule of law though they respected the actions of the President according to the city legal officer, Jesus Carbon Jr.

Misuari went on accusing neighboring Malaysia by claiming that Malaysia was using Moro people for kidnappings since the 2000 Sipadan kidnappings and said that he wanted to drag the country leaders to International Criminal Court (ICC), saying that "the [pieces of] evidence are available as his people are everywhere and Malaysia cannot escape as because they are continuing to hire Moro people". In response to Misuari's accusation, Sabah Chief Minister Musa Aman urged Misuari to prove his allegation as such claims could strain relations between Malaysia and the Philippines. Malaysian state assemblyman from Senallang of Semporna Nasir Tun Sakaran also urged Misuari to give his evidence and name any Malaysian politicians who he claimed was involved as any allegation must be accompanied by evidence. In addition to that, as Malaysia has its own laws, they would investigate and condemn the involved suspects immediately if they know their identity. Malaysian Dewan Rakyat Deputy Speaker Ronald Kiandee also persuaded Misuari to prove his allegation if his claim was true, while Kinabatangan member of parliament Bung Moktar Radin said he was not surprised by the accusation towards Malaysian politicians as he had seen similar talks occur in Malaysia coffeeshops, but stressed if the allegation was true then the Malaysian authorities must take action on any individuals involved. Meanwhile, the Sabah Suluk Solidarity Council (SSSC) regretted the remarks and urged the Malaysian Embassy in Manila with the help of Philippine government to find out the identity of any Malaysian leaders who were involved in the kidnapping activities. The AFP and Philippine National Police (PNP) also requested Misuari to present his evidence than only making allegations. Malaysian Minister in the Prime Minister's Department Shahidan Kassim began investigations to verify claims by Misuari and admitted there could be involvement of certain groups. In response to all questions directed to him, Misuari said he'd present all the evidence only to ICC. He also stated that he wouldn't sit on the same negotiating table with MILF who he described as "traitors", as well accusing fellow MNLF faction Muslimin Sema and ARMM Governor Mujib Hataman of "associating with drug lords and involvement in the 2016 Davao City bombing". As a response, President Duterte said that he'd be ready to give Misuari group a separate peace talks as Misuari didn't want a similar peace talk with the MILF. The President stated "I will talk to everybody soon after my visit to Malaysia".

=== Corruption charges ===
Misuari was charged with graft following the "anomalous" bidding of educational materials that was committed between 2000 and 2001 during his term as the governor for the ARMM, amounting to ₱137.5 million. He was charged with 3 counts of graft and 3 counts of malversation of non-existent educational materials. According to the charge sheets filed before court by the Office of the Ombudsman on May 22, 2017, and released to media on May 24, Misuari authored the purchase of materials for 3 separate educational projects in the ARMM in 2000 and 2001. All of these materials, according to state investigations, were never delivered.

On May 24. 2024, Misuari, represented by counsel, Ma. Victoria Lim-Florido, was virtually present at the promulgation of the Decision of the Sandiganbayan's Third Division penned by Presiding Justice Amparo Cabotaje-Tang. He was found guilty of two counts of graft but acquitted of two counts of malversation and allowed to post Bail. The cases originated from the procurement of around P77 million worth of educational materials purchased from MBJ Learning Tools and CPR Publishing when he was ARMM governor in 2000 and 2001. On September 17, the Sandiganbayan dismissed Misuari's appeal.

== See also ==
- Peace process with the Bangsamoro in the Philippines
- List of Filipino Nobel laureates and nominees
