= Office of the Presidential Adviser on Peace, Reconciliation and Unity =

Philippine government agency on peace negotiations

- Tanggapan ng Pampanguluhang Tagapayo sa Prosesong Pangkapayapaan
- Seal of the office

Agency overview
- Formed: September 15, 1993; 33 years ago
- Headquarters: 5/F Agustin I Building, F. Ortigas Jr. Road, Ortigas Center, Pasig, Philippines
- Agency executive: Sec. Mel Senen Sarmiento, Presidential Adviser on Peace, Reconciliation and Unity
- Parent agency: Office of the President of the Philippines
- Website: peace.gov.ph

The Office of the Presidential Adviser on Peace, Reconciliation and Unity (OPAPRU), formerly Office of the Presidential Adviser on the Peace Process (OPAPP; Filipino: Tanggapan ng Pampanguluhang Tagapayo sa Prosesong Pangkapayapaan) is a Philippine government agency that handles peace talks and negotiations related to internal conflict and rebellion in the country, most notably the CPP-NPA-NDF and Moro conflicts.

== History ==
In the 1960s and 1970s, two significant insurgent groups emerged in the Philippines: the Moro National Liberation Front (MNLF), led by Nur Misuari and advocating for Moro self-determination, and the New People's Army (NPA), which sought to establish a communist government. The administration of President Ferdinand Marcos started negotiations with the MNLF which led to the signing of the Tripoli Agreement in 1976. This led to a plebiscite where people voted whether to approve or disapprove the establishment of an autonomous region in the southern Philippines. Both the voters and the MNLF, which viewed the implementation of the agreement as one-sided in favor of the government, rejected the plebiscite. No negotiations were made with the NPA under Marcos and the Moro Islamic Liberation Front (MILF) subsequently split from the MNLF.

When Corazon Aquino assumed presidency following the People Power Revolution, she started peace talks with the MNLF, MILF, the CPP–NPA–NDF, and the Cordillera People's Liberation Army (CPLA). Peace talks with CPLA led to a bodong or peace pact that led to the establishment of the Cordillera Administrative Region. The Jeddah Accord was signed with the MNLF with the government agreeing to pursue further talks on the establishment of an autonomous region consisting of Mindanao and Palawan but peace talks collapsed in 1987 due to conflict between the Jeddah and Tripoli accords. Negotiations with the CPP–NPA–NDF is likewise unsuccessful.

Aquino's successor, President Fidel V. Ramos upon being elected in 1994 started negotiations with the NDF in the Netherlands and issued Proclamation No. 10 which granted amnesty to communist rebels, this was amended through Proclamation No. 10-A which established the National Unification Commission (NUC) which made a report regarding the "formulation of a peace process" by conducting public consultations in different parts of the country to gain input. The NUC submitted its report to President Ramos on July 31, 1993, and became defunct the beginning of the next month.

The Office of the Presidential Adviser on the Peace Process was established on September 15, 1993, through the issuance of Executive Order No. 125 by President Ramos. Ramos took into account recommendations of the NUC. The first head of agency is Manuel Yan with the rank of cabinet Secretary. Secretary Yan served for seven years under this position.

The agency was renamed to Office of the Presidential Adviser on Peace, Reconciliation and Unity (OPAPRU) on December 29, 2021.

== List of Head of Agency ==
1993-2001 Manuel Yan

2001-2002 Eduardo Ermita

2003-2005 Teresita Quintos Deles

2006-2008 Jesus Dureza

2008-2009 Avelino Razon

2009-2010 Anabelle Abaya

2010-2016 Teresita Quintos Deles

2016-2018 Jesus Dureza

2018 to 2026 Carlito Galvez Jr.

2026 to Present Mel Senen Sarmiento

== See also ==
- Moro Islamic Liberation Front
- Communist Party of the Philippines
- Moro National Liberation Front
- Cordillera People's Liberation Army
- Revolutionary Workers' Party (Philippines)
- Manuel Yan
- Teresita Quintos Deles
- Marvic Leonen
