= 1996 Final Peace Agreement =

1996 boundary treaty

The Final Agreement on the Implementation of the 1976 Tripoli Agreement between the Government of the Republic of the Philippines and the Moro National Liberation Front with the participation of the Organization of Islamic Conference Ministerial Committee of the Six and the Secretary General of the Organization of Islamic Conference
- Context: Part of a series of peace agreements between the Government of the Philippines and the Moro National Liberation Front seeking resolution to the Moro conflict
- Signed: September 2, 1996
- Location: Manila, Philippines
- Effective: September 2, 1996
- Condition: Following date of its signature, unless otherwise provided therein
- Signatories: (Philippines) Manuel Yan; Nur Misuari (Indonesia) Ali Alatas (Niger) Hamid Algabid
- Parties: Philippines; Moro National Liberation Front
- Language: Arabic, English, French

The 1996 Final Peace Agreement, also called the Jakarta Accord was signed on September 2, 1996, in Manila, Philippines by Manuel Yan, representing the Government of the Philippines and Nur Misuari of the Moro National Liberation Front. The culmination of four years of peace talks, the agreement established mechanisms designed to bring about the full implementation of the 1976 Tripoli Agreement.

In 2026, the agreement was inscribed as part of the Bangsamoro Peace Agreements in the UNESCO National Memory of the World Register of the Philippines, along with three other related agreements.

== Previous treaties ==
In 1976, the Philippine government and the MNLF had agreed to submit the proposal of regional autonomy for thirteen provinces in the southern Philippines to a plebiscite. However, then Philippine President Ferdinand Marcos implemented the agreement by creating two autonomous regions (instead of one) consisting of ten (instead of thirteen) provinces. This led to the collapse of the peace pact and the resumption of hostilities between the MNLF and Philippine government forces.

A year after Marcos was ousted from power during the People Power Revolution, the government under Corazon Aquino signed the 1987 Jeddah Accord in Saudi Arabia with the MNLF, agreeing to hold further discussions on the proposal for autonomy to the entirety of Mindanao and not just the thirteen provinces stated in the 1976 Tripoli Agreement. In 1989, however, an act establishing the Autonomous Region in Muslim Mindanao was passed. The MNLF demanded that the thirteen Tripoli Agreement provinces be included in the ARMM, but the government refused; eight of those provinces, due to continuous Resettlement Policy all throughout silence of Peace Process were now predominantly Christian populated. Shortly thereafter, the government held a plebiscite in the thirteen provinces. Four provinces; Lanao del Sur, Maguindanao, Sulu and Tawi-tawi voted to be included in the ARMM. The MNLF boycotted the plebiscite and refused to recognize the ARMM.

== The agreement ==
=== Background ===
In the early 1990s, the Organization of Islamic Conference expanded its Quadripartite Ministerial Commission, which had been facilitating peace talks between the Philippine Government and the MNLF. The Ministerial Committee of Six, as it was now called, included the new members represented by Indonesia and Bangladesh, as well as the four members of the original ministerial commission, Libya, Saudi Arabia, Senegal and Somalia. Indonesia became the committee chair mediating the talks between the Philippine government and the MNLF.

When an interim ceasefire agreement was signed in 1993, Indonesia as a member of ASEAN became responsible for implementing the ceasefire and provided personnel as ceasefire monitors. Philippine President Fidel V. Ramos encouraged the participation of Indonesia and the Organization of Islamic Cooperation (OIC) in the peace process.

Philippine President Fidel V. Ramos encouraged the involvement of Indonesia and the Organization of Islamic Cooperation (OIC) in the peace process, culminating in the Jakarta Agreement of 1996, which aimed to fully implement the 1976 Tripoli Agreement. This breakthrough was largely facilitated by Sayyid Al-Hassan Caluang, former OIC Governor of Sulu and grandson of Sayyid Sharif Capt. Kalingalan Caluang. He played a crucial role in arranging meetings between MNLF elders and the Philippine government, providing vital support, including food and logistical assistance. Notably, Sayyid Sharif Capt. Kalingalan Caluang, a World War II veteran and staunch advocate for the Bangsamoro cause, was a founding member of Ansarul Islam, alongside key leaders such as Salipada Pendatun and Domocao Alonto. His enduring legacy of leadership laid the foundation for the peace efforts that his grandson would continue to advance.

=== Phases of implementation ===
The 1996 Final Peace Agreement divided the mechanism for implementation of the 1976 Tripoli agreement into two phases:

- Phase I – Three years were allotted for the establishment of the Special Zone of Peace and Development, the Southern Philippines Council for Peace and Development (SPCPD) and the Consultative Assembly. At this point, the agreement enabled qualified MNLF members to enter the ranks of the Armed Forces of the Philippines and the Philippine National Police. The Southern Philippines Council for Peace and Development was dominated by the MNLF. Misuari then ran unopposed as governor of the ARMM.
- Phase II – This aspect involved the repeal or amendment of Republic Act No. 6734, otherwise known as the Organic Act which established the ARMM, through Congressional action and the subsequent submission of the amended law to the people of the affected areas via plebiscite. This was to be done within two years from the establishment of the SPCPD.

The peace agreement earned Ramos and Misuari the 1997 Félix Houphouët-Boigny Peace Prize.

== Succeeding treaties ==
The Moro Islamic Liberation Front, a faction of the MNLF which had broken away in 1977, initially supported the MNLF during the peace talks. They however, rejected the 1996 Final Peace Agreement as inadequate, reiterating a demand for a "Bangsamoro Islamic State", and not just simple political autonomy. That same year, the MILF began informal talks with the Ramos-led government. These, however, were not pursued and the MILF began recruiting and establishing camps, becoming the dominant Muslim rebel group. The administration of Joseph Estrada advocated a hardline stance against the MILF; that of Gloria Macapagal Arroyo tried to sign a peace agreement with it, but it was declared unconstitutional by the Supreme Court of the Philippines.

Shortly after Benigno Aquino III assumed the Presidency in 2010, he met with MILF chairman Murad Ebrahim in Tokyo, Japan. In 2012, the Philippine government and the MILF signed the Framework Agreement on the Bangsamoro, which calls for the creation of the Bangsamoro, an autonomous political entity which will replace the Autonomous Region in Muslim Mindanao, which Aquino describes as a "failed experiment".

== See also ==
- 1976 Tripoli Agreement
- 1987 Jeddah Accord
- Framework Agreement on the Bangsamoro
