= Ricardo Ramírez =

Ricardo Ramírez may refer to:

- Rolando Morán (1929-1998), Ricardo Arnoldo Ramírez de León, Guatemalan communist leader
- Ricardo Ramírez (bishop) (born 1936), American Roman Catholic prelate
- Richard Ramirez (1960-2013), Ricardo Leyva Muñoz Ramirez, American serial killer and sex offender
- Ricardo Ramírez (footballer) (1973-2021), Argentine footballer
