= Joint Peace and Security Team =

Joint Peace and Security Teams
- Insignia
- Country: Philippines
- Role: Peacekeeping
- Size: 400 (November 2021)
- Part of: Joint Peace and Security Committee
- Colors: Light blue

Commanders
- Current commander: Gil M. Cambronero,

The Joint Peace and Security Team (JPSTs) are a peacekeeping forces composed of Philippine security personnel and Moro Islamic Liberation Front rebels in Mindanao.

== Background ==
Joint Peace and Security Teams (JPSTs) were set up as part of the 2014 Comprehensive Agreement on the Bangsamoro between the Philippine national government and the Moro Islamic Liberation Front (MILF). JPSTs are tasked to oversee the Bangsamoro peace process and the overall security of BARRM. They were established as part of the decommission process of active MILF fighters.

The JPSTs consist of former MILF rebels, and personnel of the Armed Forces of the Philippines and the Philippine National Police. It was planned that there would be 6,000 personnel serving in the JPSTs; 3,000 from the MILF, 1,600 from the police, and 1,400 from the military.

Training for would be JPST members began as early as August 2019. The first JPST barracks was established in February 2020 at the MILF-run Camp Abubakar in Barira, Maguindanao. By November 2021, only 400 people has been trained for the JPSTs with the MILF citing the COVID-19 pandemic for the low-training rate.
