= Teresita Quintos Deles =

Filipina feminist and government official

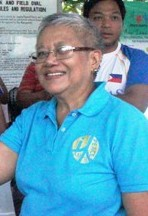
- Deles in 2012

Presidential Adviser on the Peace Process
- In office 2003–2005
- President: Gloria Macapagal Arroyo
- Preceded by: Eduardo Ermita
- Succeeded by: Jesus Dureza
- In office 2010–2016
- President: Benigno Aquino III
- Preceded by: Annabelle Abaya
- Succeeded by: Jesus Dureza

Teresita "Ging" Quintos Deles is a Filipina feminist, peace advocate, and government official best known for having been the Philippine government's Presidential Adviser on the Peace Process (OPAPP) from 2003–2005 and 2010–2016.

Deles began her career as a teacher. She then became an advocate for women's rights and worked on addressing poverty issues. In 2003 she became the first woman appointed as Presidential Adviser on the Peace Process, although Haydee Yorac had served in OPAPP's predecessor, the National Unification Council.

Deles served as Presidential Adviser on the Peace Process through 2005 and again from 2010 through 2016. While she was serving in that capacity, the Comprehensive Agreement on the Bangsamoro (CAB) was signed in 2014.

Deles has been active in several non-governmental organizations including the ASEAN Institute for Peace and Reconciliation (AIPR), the Coalition for Peace, the Standby Mediation Team under the UN Department of Public Affairs, and the Center on Innovation Transformation and Excellence in Governance (INCITEGov).

On December 2, 2024, Deles and 16 others filed the first impeachment complaint against Vice President Sara Duterte, submitting 24 articles covering five of the six constitutional grounds for impeachment.

== Honors ==
In 1992, Deles was awarded the Aurora Aragon Quezon Peace Award for "peace and advocacy and conflict resolution." For her community service as a peace advocate, she was also recognized as one of The Outstanding Women in the Nation’s Service (TOWNS) that year.

In 2012, the year the Framework Agreement on the Bangsamoro was signed, Deles was awarded of the N-Peace Award as a role model for peace. In that same year, the Friedrich Naumann Foundation for Freedom (FnF) recognized her making her one of the first recipients of the organization's Freedom Flame Award, which is given to individuals who played key roles in "events that led to allowing Filipinos to better experience freedom in the country."

== See also ==
- Marvic Leonen
- Office of the Presidential Adviser on the Peace Process
