= Miriam Coronel-Ferrer =

Filipino peace negotiator

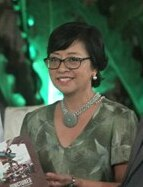
- Miriam Coronel-Ferrer (2016)

Chief Peace Negotiator for the Republic of the Philippines
- In office 2016–2019
- Preceded by: Marvic Leonen
- Succeeded by: post abolished

Personal details
- Born: 10 November 1961 (age 65) Quezon City, Philippines
- Education: University of the Philippines Diliman (AB); University of Kent (MA)
- Occupation: Professor, peace negotiator
- Profession: Political scientist

Miriam Coronel-Ferrer is a Filipino peace negotiator who was the chair of the peace panel of the government of the Philippines during the time of President Benigno S. Aquino III (2010–2016). On behalf of the government, Coronel-Ferrer signed the Comprehensive Agreement on the Bangsamoro with the Moro Islamic Liberation Front. She is the first female chief negotiator in the world to sign a final peace accord with a rebel group.

She is also a political science professor at the University of the Philippines (UP).

== Early life and education ==
Coronel-Ferrer graduated cum laude from UP Diliman with a degree in philosophy in 1980. She also possesses a master's degree in Southeast Asian studies from the University of Kent at Canterbury.

== Career ==
In the early 2000s, she served as the director of the UP Third World Studies Center and was a convenor of the Program on Peace, Democratization, and Human Rights of the UP Center for Integrative and Development Studies until 2005.

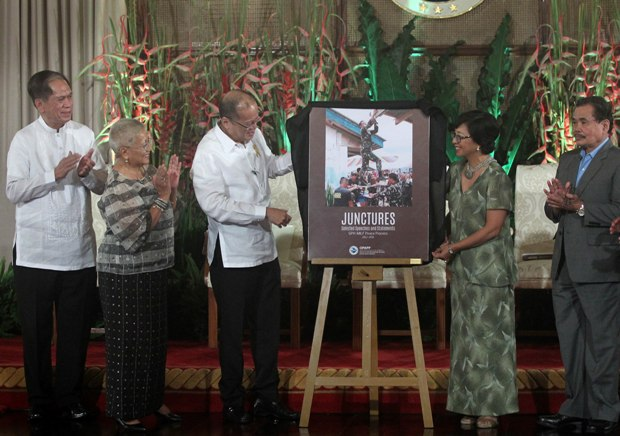
President Benigno S. Aquino III, Miriam Coronel-Ferrer and MILF negotiator Mohagher Iqbal at the presentation of a documentary on the peace process (2016)

Before joining the government peace panel, Coronel-Ferrer was already involved in a number of campaigns. She was founding co-chair of the Non-State Actors Working Group of the 1997 Nobel Peace Prize winner International Campaign to Ban Landmines, and served in this capacity from 1999–2004. In 2005, she joined 26 other Filipinas nominated among the "1,000 Women for the Nobel" peace prize in 2005. She co-led the civil society-initiated drafting of the National Action Plan (NAP) on UN Security Council Resolution 1325. The Philippine NAP was formally adopted by the government in March 2010.

Appointed by President Benigno Simeon Aquino III to the Government Negotiating Panel in July 2010, she was assigned to her post as Panel Chair on 7 December 2012, replacing Associate Justice Marvic Leonen.

As the chair of the government panel, Prof. Ferrer oversaw the implementation of the Comprehensive Agreement on the Bangsamoro.

== Other activities ==
- International Crisis Group (ICG), board of trustees (since 2022)

== Publications and awards ==
Prof. Ferrer has published several books and journal articles on Philippine democratization, civil society, human rights and peace processes, and served as visiting professor in Hankuk University in Seoul, Hiroshima University in Japan, and Gadjah Mada University in Yogjakarta, Indonesia.

Awards received by Coronel-Ferrer include the 2015 Hillary Rodham Clinton Award for Advancing Women in Peace and Security, the 2015 Xavier University-Ateneo de Cagayan Fr. William F Masterson SJ Award, the 2014 United Nations Development Program N-Peace Award for Campaigning for Action, and the 2011 Philippine Science High School Alumni Association Gawad Lagabalab for Outstanding Alumni.

She received the Ramon Magsaysay Award in 2023.

== Mamasapano ==
In the aftermath of the Mamasapano clash, a police operation that successfully killed Malaysian terrorist Zulkifli Abdhir alias Marwan, but led to the killing of 44 police commandos by Moro rebels, Coronel-Ferrer was involved in a tense exchange with Senator Alan Peter Cayetano. Coronel-Ferrer argued that "The government policy is to negotiate with the armed groups that are fighting the government." The Senator responded by saying, "All governments around the world, the policy is not to negotiate with terrorists. If the peace panel does not know that, we’re in trouble." To which Coronel-Ferrer replied that she was "not aware of any such policy."

Coronel-Ferrer's calls for calm in the wake of the clash have drawn criticism from many Filipino netizens. Many have accused her of treason and of rushing the peace process, at the expense of justice. She received death threats and manipulated, sexually explicit images of her spread across the Internet. However, Coronel-Ferrer says she accepts them as "part of the job".
