= Joint peacekeeping force =

Joint peacekeeping force is a mixed peacekeeping forces:

- Joint Control Commission for Georgian–Ossetian Conflict Resolution (JPKF) – Russian/Ossetian/Georgian mixed forces in South Ossetia (1992 – 2008);
- Joint Control Commission (sometimes referred as "Joint peacekeeping force") – Russian/Transnistrian/Moldavian mixed forces in Transnistria (1992 – current);
- Joint Peace and Security Team (sometimes referred as "Joint peacekeeping force") – Moro Islamic Liberation Front/Philippines mixed forces;
- United Nations peacekeeping forces (sometimes referred as "UN Joint peacekeeping force");
- Multinational Force and Observers (sometimes referred as "Joint peacekeeping force")
