= Framework Agreement on the Bangsamoro =

2012 preliminary peace agreement

- Areas in red constitute the existing Bangsamoro autonomous region
- Context: Part of a series of peace agreements between the Government of the Philippines and the Moro Islamic Liberation Front seeking resolution to the Moro conflict
- Signed: October 15, 2012
- Location: Malacañan Palace, Manila, Philippines
- Sealed: October 15, 2012
- Signatories: (Philippines) Marvic Leonen; Mohagher Iqbal (Malaysia) Ab Ghafar Mohamed
- Parties: Philippines; Moro Islamic Liberation Front
- Language: Arabic, English, Filipino

The Framework Agreement on the Bangsamoro is a preliminary peace agreement signed in the Malacañan Palace in Manila, Philippines on October 15, 2012. The agreement calls for the creation of an autonomous political entity named Bangsamoro, replacing the Autonomous Region in Muslim Mindanao (ARMM) which was described by Former President Benigno Aquino III as "a failed experiment".

In 2026, the agreement was inscribed as part of the Bangsamoro Peace Agreements in the UNESCO National Memory of the World Register of the Philippines, along with three other related agreements.

== Origins ==
The Moro Islamic Liberation Front and the Philippines held peace talks in Kuala Lumpur in Malaysia from October 2–6. On October 7, President Aquino announced that the two parties have agreed to sign a preliminary peace agreement which calls for the creation of an autonomous political entity named Bangsamoro, superseding the Autonomous Region in Muslim Mindanao (ARMM). He criticized the ARMM as a "failed experiment" that did not address issues such as electoral fraud, political patronage, poverty, war and warlordism. Aquino stated that structural reform is necessary, with the creation of Bangsamoro solving these issues while upholding national sovereignty. The agreement was reached after 32 peace talks between the two parties that spanned a period of nine years.

== Signing ==
The Philippine government's chief negotiator Marvic Leonen and his Moro Islamic Liberation Front counterpart Mohagher Iqbal signed the agreement on October 15, 2012, in the Rizal Ceremonial Hall of Malacañan Palace in Manila, Philippines. The agreement was sealed at about 15:00 PST. Malaysian facilitator Ab Ghafar Mohamed, President Aquino, Malaysian Prime Minister Najib Razak, MILF chairman Al Haj Murad Ebrahim and Secretary-General Ekmeleddin İhsanoğlu of the Organisation of Islamic Cooperation were all present at the signing of the agreement.

== International Contact Group ==
The International Contact Group for the Southern Philippines Peace Process worked to help the parties move towards the landmark agreements, the Framework Agreement and two years later Comprehensive Agreement on the Bangsamoro, putting an end to decades of conflict.

The International Contact Group (ICG) was established in December 2009 to advise and assist the two parties and the Malaysian facilitator in talks. It was a mix of diplomats and NGOs. Four countries were members: Japan, United Kingdom, Turkey and Saudi Arabia, and four international NGOs: the Centre for Humanitarian Dialogue, Muhammadiyah, the Asia Foundation and Conciliation Resources.

== International reactions ==
- Australia – Australian Foreign Minister, Bob Carr welcomed the development and said the Philippine government's announcement of the agreement "offered hope that the 28-year conflict in Mindanao could be drawing to a close." He particularly acknowledged the leadership of President Benigno Aquino III whom he described as a "strong advocate for peace."
- European Union – EU High Representative, Catherine Ashton, in a statement, congratulated the Philippine government and the Moro Islamic Liberation Front on the successful conclusion of the framework peace agreement. Ashton said the EU also recognized the contributions of the Malaysian facilitator in the peace talks, Tengku Datuk Ab Ghafar Tengku Mohamed, as well as members of the International Contact Group. The EU foreign affairs chief also said "the EU, as a member of the International Monitoring Team and major development partner in poverty alleviation in Mindanao since 1990, will continue to lend its full support."
- Indonesia – The Ministry of Foreign Affairs of Indonesia said that Indonesia "warmly welcomes" the development and described this agreement as well as the previous peace agreement between the Government of the Philippines and the Moro National Liberation Front in 1996 as a reflection of the "strong commitment of the Philippine government to create comprehensive peace in the Southern Philippines." It also added that Indonesia "stands ready to provide support and assistance including in exchange of experiences." Indonesia earlier sealed a similar peace agreement with its decades-long secessionist group GAM in Aceh region in 2005.
- Japan – The Ministry of Foreign Affairs of Japan said that Japan "heartily welcomes" the Framework Agreement, which it described as the first step towards the realization of the peace process in Mindanao. Japan also pays respect to the Philippines and the MILF, as well as to Malaysia for its role as facilitator. The ministry also added that Japan hopes for the steady implementation of the agreement and expects more difficulties must be overcome to reach a final agreement. Finally, it said that Japan continues to offer full support to the Mindanao Peace Process.
- Organisation of Islamic Cooperation – The OIC welcomed the preliminary peace agreement signed between the Philippine government and the Moro Islamic Liberation Front (MILF). The OIC also calls for the full implementation of the 1976 Tripoli Agreement and the 1996 Final Peace Agreement, which the Philippines signed with the Moro National Liberation Front (MNLF).
- Thailand – The agreement has been studied by Thailand as a possible framework to help solve its own southern Muslim insurgency.
- Turkey – The Ministry of Foreign Affairs of Turkey "congratulates the Parties on the constructive attitude they have demonstrated during the dialogue process which has paved the way for this important agreement." It also stated that "Turkey believes in the importance of mediation for the prevention and settlement of conflicts and stands ready to provide support also to the subsequent phases of the Mindanao Peace Process." Turkey is a member of the International Contact Group involved in the peace talks.
- United Kingdom – UK Foreign Secretary, William Hague said the United Kingdom "wholeheartedly welcomes" the framework agreement which he calls a "testament to the commitment and vision of the parties." It also stated that "full implementation of the agreement by 2016 can bring about peace, security, and development which will be good not only for Mindanao, but for the whole of the Philippines." The secretary also reiterated his government's commitment as a member of the International Contact Group for the peace process and said the UK "stands ready to provide further assistance if such a role would be valuable to the parties."
- United States – US Secretary of State, Hillary Clinton affirmed that "the United States welcomes the announcement of the framework agreement between the Government of the Philippines and the Moro Islamic Liberation Front" and said that the agreement "is a testament to the commitment of all sides for a peaceful resolution to the conflict in the southern Philippines". The secretary also added that the next step is for the full implementation of the agreement and "encourage all parties to work together to build peace, prosperity and greater opportunities for all the people of the Philippines".

== See also ==
- Comprehensive Agreement on the Bangsamoro
- 1976 Tripoli Agreement
- 1987 Jeddah Accord
- 1996 Final Peace Agreement
