= Bangsamoro peace process =

Aspect of Philippine history

Formal peace negotiations between the Government of the Philippines and the various armed groups involved in the Moro conflict began in 1976 when the Philippine government and the Moro National Liberation Front first met to negotiate towards the 1976 Tripoli Agreement, and most recently reached a major milestone in the ratification of the Bangsamoro Organic Law (BOL) through a plebiscite in 2018, leading to the creation of the Bangsamoro Autonomous Region in Muslim Mindanao. However, conflicts with other smaller armed groups continue to exist.

The peace process as outlined in the Comprehensive Agreement which led to the creation of the Bangsamoro involved two tracks - the political-legislative track and the normalization track. Under the political track, the government would work towards the creation of a new political entity known as the Bangsamoro, to replace the Autonomous Region in Muslim Mindanao (ARMM) created in 1989. Under the normalization track, the MILF would turn over their firearms to a third party, which would be selected by the rebels and the Philippine government. The MILF agreed to decommission its armed wing, the Bangsamoro Islamic Armed Forces (BIAF).

== History of negotiations ==
=== Beginnings of the Moro conflict during the Marcos dictatorship ===
The rise of the Marcos dictatorship marked the beginnings of at least two long-running conflicts that continued to plague the Philippine government: the Moro conflict and the New People's Army conflict. In terms of the Moro conflict, many of the key events took place either during the latter part of Marcos' first or second constitutionally-allowed presidential terms, or during the time when he ruled under Martial Law. This included the beginning of the active phase of the Moro Conflict with the formation of separatist political movements, the formation and rise of the Moro National Liberation Front once peaceful political movements were banned under Martial Law, the signing of the 1976 Tripoli Agreement brokered by Muammar Gaddafi, the failure to create an autonomous region in for the Moros in Mindanao during the 1977 Southern Philippines autonomy plebiscite, and the resulting breakaway of the Moro Islamic Liberation Front as a new armed group.

==== Beginning of the active phase of the Moro conflict ====
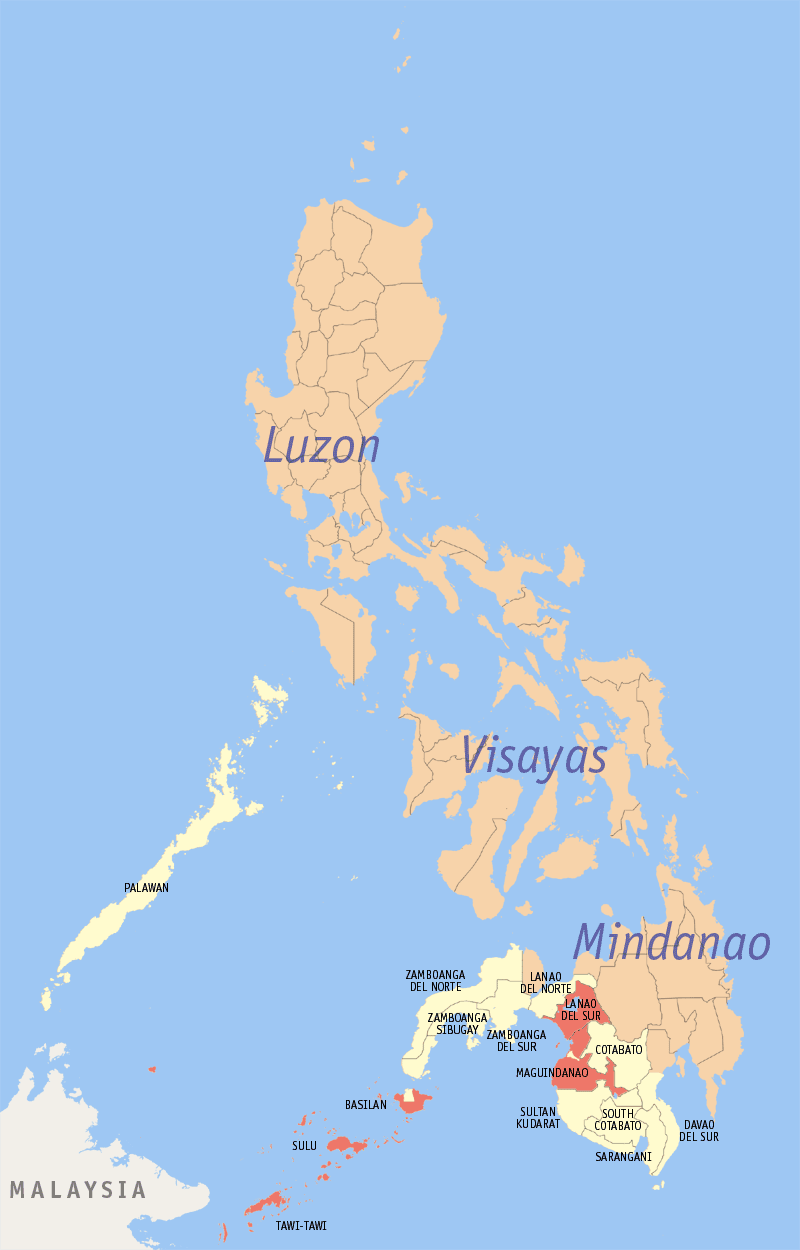
Areas in Mindanao Philippines under Autonomous Region in Muslim Mindanao are in red.

The active phase of the Moro conflict is attributed to news about the Jabidah massacre in March 1968 – towards the end of the first term of President Ferdinand Marcos. A senate exposé broke the news that at least 11 Filipino Muslim military trainees had been killed in Corregidor by soldiers of the Armed Forces of the Philippines, with only one survivor living to escape and tell the tale. The news created unrest among Filipino Muslims, and both Muslim intellectuals and common people suddenly became politicized, discrediting the idea of finding integration and accommodation with the rest of the country, and creating a sense of marginalization.

==== Formation of the Moro National Liberation Front ====
On October 21, 1972, University of the Philippines professor Nur Misuari formed the Moro National Liberation Front (MNLF) which sought the establishment of a Moro republic through the force of arms.

The MNLF and the Armed Forces of the Philippines engaged in extensive armed collisions between 1972 and 1976, peaking in 1973 when the rebels' "blitz-like operations" brought them control of a substantial number of municipalities surrounding Cotabato City and its airport complex, with another major highlight being the 1974 Battle of Jolo in which the armed conflict between the two groups resulted in the near-total destruction of what had been the relatively modern municipality of Jolo, Sulu.

This prompted the Marcos regime to beef up military presence by deploying almost three-fourths of the army in most Muslim-majority parts of Mindanao.

By 1976, the conflict had turned into a stalemate, with neither side able to achieve a decisive victory over the other.

==== 1976 Tripoli Agreement ====
Until 1976, the MNLF received support from Malaysia and Libya. So in November 1976, Marcos sent his wife Imelda Marcos - along with a 60-person entourage that included Industry Secretary Vicente Paterno - to meet with Muammar Gaddafi in Libya "to charm Col. Kadaffi [sic]" and offer a lucrative oil deal in exchange for his withdrawal of support for the MNLF through Malaysia.

The delegation was successful, and representatives of the Philippine government and the MNLF met at the negotiating table in December 1976. The final result was the 1976 Tripoli Agreement, which among other things was the first agreement to introduce the concept of an autonomous Muslim region in Mindanao.

However, Marcos unilaterally insisted on implementing the creation of the autonomous Muslim region through the mechanism of a plebiscite, which had not been discussed in the negotiations of the Tripoli agreement. The resulting 1977 Southern Philippines autonomy plebiscite led to the creation of two Regional Autonomous Governments (RAGs) in Western Mindanao and Central Mindanao rather than a single autonomous region.

The MNLF saw this as a deviation from the framework of the Tripoli Agreement. It became apparent to the MNLF that Marcos had no intentions of fulfilling the Agreement, and was only using it to diffuse the conflict and weaken the MNLF's position. The deal collapsed within six months, and hostilities between the MNLF and Philippine government forces resumed.

==== Formation of the Moro Islamic Liberation Front ====
The signing of this agreement brought about a serious rift in MNLF leadership, leading to the formation of a breakaway group in 1977 by Hashim Salamat and 57 MNLF officers. The group was initially known as "The New Leadership". Misuari expelled Salamat in December 1977, after which Salamat moved his new organization first to Cairo, Egypt, and then, in 1980, to Lahore, Pakistan, where it engaged in diplomatic activities.

This breakaway organization was formally established in 1984 as the Moro Islamic Liberation Front (MILF).

=== Negotiations under the post–People Power government ===
==== Peace talks under the post–People Power government ====
Soon after becoming President of the Philippines as a result of the civilian-led People Power Revolution, Corazon Aquino arranged a meeting with the MNLF chairman Nur Misuari and several MNLF rebel groups in Sulu, which paved the way for a series of negotiations.

==== 1987 Jeddah Accord ====
In 1987, the administration of Corazon Aquino signed the 1987 Jeddah Accord with the MNLF, agreeing to hold further discussions on the proposal for autonomy to the entirety of Mindanao and not just the thirteen provinces stated in the 1976 Tripoli Agreement.

=== Creation of the ARMM ===
On August 1, 1989, under the mandate of the new 1987 constitution, Congress enacted Republic Act 6734 which authorized the creation of the Autonomous Region in Muslim Mindanao (ARMM) pending ratification through a plebiscite.

The MNLF demanded that the thirteen Tripoli Agreement provinces be included in the ARMM, but the government refused; eight of those provinces, due to continuous Resettlement Policy all throughout silence of Peace Process were now predominantly Christian populated.

When the government held a plebiscite in the thirteen provinces and 9 cities covered by the Tripoli Agreement, only the provinces of Lanao del Sur, Maguindanao, Sulu and Tawi-Tawi opted to become part of the ARMM, which was formally established on November 6, 1990.

=== Creation of NUC and OPAPP ===
When former Defense Secretary Fidel V. Ramos became president in 1992, he made "national reconciliation" and peace - particularly in Mindanao - a cornerstone of his agenda. He issued Proclamation No. 10-A which established a National Unification Commission (NUC) which was tasked with writing a report regarding the "formulation of a peace process" after conducting public consultations in different parts of the country.

Martial Law era lawyer-activist and Commission on Elections Chairperson Haydee Yorac was appointed to chair the commission, which submitted its report to President Ramos on July 31, 1993, after which it officially ceased to exist. But the Office of the Presidential Adviser on the Peace Process was established on September 15, 1993, through the issuance of Executive Order No. 125 by President Ramos, which took into account recommendations of the NUC. Yorac is thus included in the lineage of former heads of the OPAPP, which was later renamed the Office of the Presidential Adviser on Peace, Reconciliation and Unity (OPAPRU).

=== 1996 Final Peace Agreement with the MNLF (Jakarta Accord) ===
In the early 1990s, the Organization of Islamic Conference expanded its Quadripartite Ministerial Commission, which had been facilitating peace talks between the Philippine Government and the MNLF. The Ministerial Committee of Six now included Indonesia, which was also a member of ASEAN. As such, Indonesia became the committee chair mediating the talks between the Philippine government and the MNLF, and soon provided personnel as ceasefire monitors.

When an interim ceasefire agreement was signed in 1993, Philippine President Fidel V. Ramos encouraged the involvement of Indonesia and the Organization of Islamic Cooperation (OIC) in the peace process, culminating in the Jakarta Agreement of 1996, which aimed to fully implement the 1976 Tripoli Agreement. This breakthrough was largely facilitated by Sayyid Al-Hassan Caluang, former OIC Governor of Sulu and grandson of Sayyid Sharif Capt. Kalingalan Caluang. He played a crucial role in arranging meetings between MNLF elders and the Philippine government, providing vital support, including food and logistical assistance. Notably, Sayyid Sharif Capt. Kalingalan Caluang, a World War II veteran and staunch advocate for the Bangsamoro cause, was a founding member of Ansarul Islam, alongside key leaders such as Salipada Pendatun and Domocao Alonto. His enduring legacy of leadership laid the foundation for the peace efforts that his grandson would continue to advance.

Indonesia thus facilitated the Jakarta Agreement, billed as the "Final Peace Agreement" in 1996, which was supposed to lead to the full implementation of the 1976 Tripoli Agreement, and eventually the end of the Moro armed struggle in Mindanao.

The accord divided the mechanism for implementation of the 1976 Tripoli agreement into two phases:

- Phase I – Three years were allotted for the establishment of the Special Zone of Peace and Development, the Southern Philippines Council for Peace and Development (SPCPD) and the Consultative Assembly. At this point, the agreement enabled qualified MNLF members to enter the ranks of the Armed Forces of the Philippines and the Philippine National Police. The Southern Philippines Council for Peace and Development was dominated by the MNLF. Misuari then ran unopposed as governor of the ARMM.
- Phase II – This aspect involved the repeal or amendment of Republic Act No. 6734, otherwise known as the Organic Act which established the ARMM, through Congressional action and the subsequent submission of the amended law to the people of the affected areas via plebiscite. This was to be done within two years from the establishment of the SPCPD.

The peace agreement earned Ramos and Misuari the 1997 Félix Houphouët-Boigny Peace Prize.

=== 1997 interim truce with the MNLF ===
After the signing of the Jakarta Accord with the MNLF, exploratory and preparatory talks towards a truce between the government and the MILF started in August 1996, followed by low-level negotiations commencing January the following year. An Agreement on General Cessation of Hostilities between the two parties was signed in July 1997.

Misuari, who had been elected governor of the ARMM, was tasked to supervise the implementation of the peace pact.

=== Estrada "all-out war" policy towards the MILF ===
Low-level negotiations between the government and the MILF, which continued to engage in armed conflict now that the MNLF had signed the peace deal, continued during the earliest part of the new administration of President Joseph Ejercito-Estrada.

Formal peace talks began in October 1999, only to be suspended by Estrada's sudden policy-shift by declaring an "all-out war" against the MILF. Subsequently, the MILF's chairman Salamat declared jihad against Estrada's administration.

Estrada's all-out war policy led to the capture of Camp Abubakar, MILF's main headquarters. The president himself led the military in raising the Philippine flag in the erstwhile rebel stronghold, bringing trucks of lechon (roasted pig) and beer for the triumphant soldiers in what was considered as an insult to the MILF because pork and alcohol are both prohibited in Islam.

=== Peace talks during the Arroyo administration ===
When Gloria Macapagal Arroyo assumed the presidency in January 2001, the peace process was revived with a unilateral declaration of ceasefire on the part of the government. With the assistance of the Malaysian government, Presidential Adviser on the Peace Process Eduardo Ermita and MILF Vice-Chair Al Haj Murad Ebrahim signed the Agreement for the General Framework for the Resumption of Peace Talks between the government and the MILF.

On March 31, 2001, Republic Act 9054 lapsed into law without the signature of the president. This law amended the Organic Act of the ARMM to provide for the region's expansion from the original four provinces under its jurisdiction. The Provinces of Basilan, Cotabato, Davao del Sur, Lanao del Norte, Palawan, Sarangani, South Cotabato, Sultan Kudarat, Zamboanga del Norte, Zamboanga del Sur, Zamboanga Sibugay, and the cities of Cotabato, Dapitan, Dipolog, General Santos, Iligan, Marawi, Pagadian, Puerto Princesa, Zamboanga, Digos, Koronadal, Tacurong, and Kidapawan participated in the plebiscite. However, only Marawi City and Basilan (excluding Isabela City) voted to be included in the ARMM.

Another setback for the peace process happened later that year, when the military attacked the MILF just a day after the ancestral domain aspect of the Tripoli Agreement was signed in Libya. This attack was based on intelligence reports that the MILF had been aiding the Abu Sayyaf terrorist group, which at that time held some American and Filipino hostages in Basilan. A ceasefire would once again ensue after informal talks between the government and the MILF through the intercession of the Malaysian Government.

On October 29, 2001, the MILF and MNLF held unity talks, but this would fall apart barely a month later when Nur Misuari allegedly led a rebellion in Sulu and Zamboanga City to stall the scheduled ARMM elections. A hundred people died in the incident. The government quelled this rebellion and Misuari escaped to Sabah, but the Malaysian government later on deported him back to the Philippines to face rebellion charges.

On May 6, 2002, the fourth round of formal peace talks between the government and the MILF resulted in both parties agreeing to veto criminal syndicates and kidnap-for-ransom groups in Mindanao, and to implement the Humanitarian Rehabilitation and Development aspect of the Tripoli Agreement.

A final draft of the peace accord was presented to the leaders of Congress on February 10, 2003, but on the next day, a setback would ensue as the military launched an offensive in Buliok Complex against the MILF which would last for more than a week. Ceasefire was enforced three weeks later. By March, the parties began exploratory talks in Malaysia with a commitment from both sides for a "mutual secession of hostilities." The aspect of a Muslim ancestral domain was laid down as the next agenda for the peace talks. Until the end of 2008, the peace process remained in a deadlock due to constitutional and legal issues surrounding the ancestral domain aspect.

The Malaysian government, on the other side, has strongly condemned any terrorist activity and expressed unequivocal support for peace negotiations between Moro rebels and the Philippine government rather than helping the rebels as Malaysia did in 1968 after the Jabidah massacre. During the Conference on Regional Security Meeting held in Makati, Metro Manila, in April 2003, Malaysian Defence Minister Najib Razak make a speech on his country's intention on the issues:

Let the audience know that Kuala Lumpur stood with the Philippine government. Malaysia did not support or condone Islamic secessionists seeking change through 'extreme' behaviour outside the political arena, and that 'extremism is loathed by Islam and that resorting to violence is equally condemned by true believers'. If indeed it claims to represent Muslims, the Moro movements must combat radicalism and militant elements within its organisation. Instead the rebels must concentrate on bringing greater development to the community instead of merely aiming to seize power. Let us call for a jihad against poverty, against ignorance, against underdevelopment and against prejudice.

=== Muslim Ancestral Domain and the Bangsamoro Juridical Entity ===
On July 27, 2008, a Memorandum of Agreement on the Muslim Ancestral Domain (MOA-AD) was finalized in Malaysia. Under this agreement, some 700 villages in Mindanao would hold a referendum within a year to determine if they intend to join the "Bangsamoro Juridical Entity," an associated state which would be formed after the necessary constitutional amendments are undertaken by the government. This agreement was scheduled to be signed on August 5, with the final peace agreement set to be concluded by November.

Three days before the scheduled signing of the MOA-AD, local officials of Cotabato filed a case asking the Supreme Court of the Philippines to block the signing of this agreement. On October 14, the court voted 8–7 to strike down the MOA-AD as unconstitutional. According to the decision penned by Justice Conchita Carpio Morales, "the Constitution does not recognize any state within this country other than the Philippine State, much less does it provide for the possibility of any transitory status to prepare any part of Philippine territory for independence." Likewise, the court held as unconstitutional the guarantees under the MOA-AD that the government will implement the necessary constitutional amendments to create a framework for its implementation. According to the court, the peace panel and even the President of the Philippines does not have the authority to make such guarantees because they do not have the power to propose amendments to the Constitution, such power being vested exclusively in Congress.

The junking of the MOA-AD marked another setback for the peace process, with the armed conflicts for the year 2008 reaching a record-high of 30 incidents in Mindanao. In an effort to salvage the negotiations, Arroyo declared the suspension of military operations against the MILF in July 2009.

=== Resumption of peace talks under the Benigno Aquino III presidency ===
The administration of Benigno Aquino III resumed peace negotiations, the 20th round, with the MILF in February 2011, after the rebel group announced that they were no longer seeking secession from the Philippines.

=== Creation of the Bangsamoro ===
==== 2011 Aquino-Murad meeting ====
On the evening of August 4, 2011, the peace process between the government and the MILF took a significant step forward when Benigno Aquino III met with MILF chair Al Haj Murad Ebrahim in a meeting in Tokyo. During the meeting, Aquino and Murad agreed to continue the peace taks, and also to make sure that they would result in an agreement that could be implemented by the end of Aquino's term as president on June 30, 2016.

==== Al-Barka attack and other peace spoiler events ====
Despite the progress of new peace talks under the new Aquino administration, various peace spoiler events, including attacks on the Military by rogue MILF forces, threatened to derail the peace process. The most prominent of these attacks at this stage of the peace talks came on October 18, 2011, when MILF forces ambushed an Army contingent in Al-Barka, Basilan, killing 19 young soldiers and wounding 12 others.

Despite critics saying that the MILF's efforts to make these rogue leaders answer for their attacks were half-hearted the president and the military hierarchy rejected calls for an "all-out-war" approach to this problem.

The timing of the Al-Barka attack just two months after the Aquino-Murad meeting gave rise to concerns that the real reason for the stalled peace process was not just the government's lukewarm effort to make peace, but also the supposed lack of sincerity of the rebel groups in negotiating lasting peace with the government.

==== 2012 Framework Agreement on the Bangsamoro ====
On October 15, 2012, the Philippine government signed the Framework Agreement on the Bangsamoro, a document which culminates the Aquino administration's effort to end the deadlock in the peace process. This new document, while merely providing for a general framework for the actual peace negotiations, announced that "the status quo is unacceptable and that the Bangsamoro shall be established to replace the Autonomous Region in Muslim Mindanao (ARMM). The Bangsamoro is the new autonomous political entity (NPE) referred to in the Decision Points of Principles as of April 2012."

President Aquino noted that he hoped the framework agreement "can finally seal genuine, lasting peace in Mindanao."

On January 24, 2014, Philippine government chief negotiator Miriam Coronel-Ferrer and MILF chief negotiator Mohagher Iqbal signed the final annex of the peace agreement in Kuala Lumpur. Two months later, on March 27, 2014, the Comprehensive Agreement on the Bangsamoro was signed in Manila and witnessed by Philippine President Benigno Aquino III, MILF Chairman Al Haj Murad Ibrahim, and Malaysian Prime Minister Najib Razak.

The agreement would pave the way for the creation of a new autonomous entity called "Bangsamoro" under a law to be approved by the Philippine Congress. The government aimed to set up the region by 2016, but due to a number of peace spoiler events, it was approved through a plebiscite in 2019.

The agreement called for Muslim self-rule in parts of the southern Philippines in exchange for a deactivation of rebel forces by the MILF. MILF forces would turn over their firearms to a third party to be selected by the MILF and the Philippine government. A regional police force would be established and the Philippine military would reduce the presence of troops and help disband private armies in the area.

The European Union provided €85 million to further the peace process in August 2020.

==== 2014 Comprehensive Agreement on the Bangsamoro ====
On March 27, 2014, a comprehensive peace deal was signed between the government of the Philippines and the Moro Islamic Liberation Front. Under its terms, the government would work towards the creation of a new political entity known as the Bangsamoro, while the MILF would turn over their firearms to a third party, which would be selected by the rebels and the Philippine government, and decommission its armed wing, the Bangsamoro Islamic Armed Forces (BIAF).

Power sharing was a central point to the autonomy redesign. The ARMM charter had only listed 14 areas which were outside the powers of the regional legislature. Under the comprehensive peace agreement, the parties listed 81 powers categorized into reserved for the central government, exclusive to the Bangsamoro, and concurrent with or shared by the two sides for power sharing. Of the 81 powers, 58 were devolved to the Bangsamoro, nine were reserved to the central government, and 14 were shared. The Framework Agreement on the Bangsamoro and Four annexes, namely on Transitional Arrangements and Modalities, Revenue Generation and Wealth Sharing, Power Sharing and Normalization, together with the Addendum on Bangsamoro Waters, will be included in the comprehensive agreement.

==== Delayed BBL passage due to the 2015 Mamasapano clash ====
The 2015 Mamasapano clash resulted in a major delay in the passage of the Bangsamoro Basic Law. Bongbong Marcos, who was then chair of the Philippine Senate Committee on Local Government, announced that hearings regarding the involvement of security and armed forces provisions of the Bangsamoro Basic Law would be halted, while Senator Alan Peter Cayetano announced that his coalition would withdraw its support for the Bangsamoro Basic Law.

While the Philippine House of Representatives also suspended its hearings on the Bangsamoro Basic Law, Speaker Feliciano Belmonte said that the lower house remained supportive of the measure, although it had been somewhat "eroded" due to the killings. He also took note that unlike in the Senate where Cayetano and JV Ejercito had withdrawn their sponsorship of the bill, no congressman had done the same, and that the measure would be passed on time.

==== 2019 Passage of the Bangsamoro Organic Law ====
Due to various complications and a sometimes contentious legislative process, it would take a full decade before the Bangsamoro Organic Law abolishing the ARMM and providing for the basic structure of government for a new Bangsamoro Autonomous Region would be ratified by the 2019 Bangsamoro autonomy plebiscite.

=== Bangsamoro transition period (2019-2025) ===
With the ratification of the BOL following the plebiscite on January 21, 2019, the abolition process of the ARMM began, paving way for the setting up of the Bangsamoro autonomous region. Under the BOL, a transitional body, the Bangsamoro Transition Authority (BTA), was organized pending the election of the new region's government officials in 2022. The second part of the plebiscite held on February 6, 2019, expanded the scope of the future Bangsamoro region to include 63 barangays in Cotabato. The members of the BTA took their oaths on February 22, 2019, along with the ceremonial confirmation of the plebiscite results of both the January 21, and February 6, 2019, votes. The official turnover from the ARMM to BARMM took place on February 26, 2019, which meant the full abolition of the former.

The inauguration of BARMM and the inaugural session of the Bangsamoro Parliament took place on March 29, 2019. Murad Ebrahim took office as the region's first chief minister.

In 2020, the Bangsamoro parliament requested that the BTA be extended for an additional three years past 2022, to allow further time for the transition.

On October 28, 2021, Duterte signed Republic Act No. 11593, postponing BARMM's first regular parliamentary elections from 2022 to 2025. The law also extended the transition period of the Bangsamoro until 2025.

Following a plebiscite on September 17, 2022, Maguindanao was split into two provinces; Maguindanao del Sur and Maguindanao del Norte.

== Political and normalization components ==
Since the signing of the Comprehensive Agreement on the Bangsamoro, the Bangsamoro Peace Process has involved two major tracks – the political-legislative track and the normalization track.

=== Political – legislative track ===
Under the Political track, the government would work towards the creation of a new politidal entity known as the Bangsamoro, to take the place of the Autonomous Region in Muslim Mindanao (ARMM) which had been created in 1989.

=== Normalization track ===
Under the normalization track, the MILF would turn over their firearms to a third party which would be selected by the rebels and the Philippine government; and decommission its armed wing, the Bangsamoro Islamic Armed Forces (BIAF).

Some other components of the Normalization track include socio-economic development programs, transitional justice and reconciliation, security concerns such as the disbandment of private armed groups, and the transformation of MILF camps into productive communities.

== Approaches and principles ==
=== "Six Paths to Peace" ===
Among the guiding principles Bangsamoro peace process are a set of "Six Paths to Peace," put forward by the National Unification Commission under its Chairperson Haydee Yorac in 1992 as principles which need to be "pursued simultaneously" if the goal of a "just and lasting peace" is to be reached. These six "paths" are:

- "Pursuit of social, economic, and political reforms aimed at addressing the root causes of armed struggle and social unrest."
- "Consensus building and empowerment for peace through continuous consultation at the national and local levels."
- "Peace negotiations with armed groups"
- "Implementing measures for reconciliation, reintegration of former combatants and rehabilitation of those affected by the conflict."
- "Conflict management and protection of civilians"
- "Initiatives to build, nurture and enhance a positive climate for peace"

== International support ==
The Bangsamoro peace process was the subject of significant international cooperation over the years, with Australia’s Department of Foreign Affairs and Trade (DFAT), Canada’s Department of Foreign Affairs, Trade and Development (DFATD), the European Union, the New Zealand Ministry of Foreign Affairs and Trade (MFAT), the Swedish International Development Cooperation Agency (SIDA), and the United States Agency for International Development (USAID) among others.

== Women in the peace process ==
Women played active roles in both the formal and informal negotiations in the Mindanao peace process that brought an end to open hostilities in 2014. Miriam Coronel-Ferrer, who led the Philippine government's team in peace negotiations with the MILF, made history in becoming the first woman chief negotiator to sign to a major peace accord in history. Women also held a number of meaningful positions on the negotiating teams of both parties to the conflict. Women reportedly fostered communication between different tracks of negotiations. Civil society groups and women's groups conducted listening workshops for Bangsamoro communities and provided recommendations to the official track I negotiation process.

The resulting peace agreement includes a number of gender-specific considerations for transitional governance and women's empowerment in the future. For example, the agreement includes provisions for women's inclusion in new institutional mechanisms and suggests that women's economic participation is a crucial part of a broad national strategy for growth post-conflict.

== In popular media ==
- The role of women in the Bangsamoro peace process is the main subject of the 2019 Sheron Dayoc film Women of the Weeping River, which won Best Actress (Laila Ulao), Best Supporting Actor (Taha Daranda) and Best Picture at the QCinema International Film Festival; and Best Director (Sheron Dayoc), Best Screenplay (Sheron Dayoc), Best Supporting Actress (Sharifa Pearlsia Ali-Dans), Best Cinematography (Rommel Sales), Best Editing (Carlo Francisco Manatad), and Best Picture at the 40th Gawad Urian Awards.
- The impact of the conflict on the lives of children is portrayed in the 2018 Iar Lionel Arondaing film Unless the Water Is Safer than the Land (locally titled Musmos na Sumibol sa Gubat ng Digma).

== See also ==
- Government of the Republic of the Philippines - National Democratic Front peace negotiations
