= Jeddah Accord =

- Context: Agreement to continue discussion on the proposal of full autonomy for areas in the southern Philippines in the spirit of the 1976 Tripoli Agreement
- Signed: 4 January 1987
- Location: Jeddah, Saudi Arabia
- Signatories: (Philippines) Aquilino Pimentel Jr. Nur Misuari (Pakistan) Syed Sharifuddin Pirzada
- Parties: Philippines; Moro National Liberation Front
- Language: English

The Jeddah Accord was signed on January 3–4, 1987 in Jeddah, Saudi Arabia by Aquilino Pimentel Jr.,

representing the Government of the Philippines and Nur Misuari of the Moro National Liberation Front. The two panels agreed upon the continued discussion of the proposal of the grant of full autonomy to Mindanao, Basilan, Sulu, Tawi-Tawi and Palawan subject to democratic processes.

The Organization of Islamic Conference, headed by OIC Secretary General Syed Sharifuddin Pirzada facilitated the agreement. Other panel members included Butz Aquino, brother-in-law of then President Corazon Aquino, representing the Philippine government and Joseph B. Banghulot, representing the MNLF.

== Previous treaty ==
In 1976, the Philippine government and the MNLF had agreed to submit the proposal of regional autonomy for thirteen provinces in the southern Philippines to a plebiscite. However, then Philippine President Ferdinand Marcos implemented the agreement by creating two autonomous regions (instead of one) consisting of ten (instead of thirteen) provinces. This led to the collapse of the peace pact and the resumption of hostilities between the MNLF and Philippine government forces.

== Resumption of peace talks ==
Corazon Aquino succeeded Marcos as President in 1986 after the latter's ouster as a consequence of the People Power Revolution. Aquino had promised to assist the drive for autonomy in Mindanao and Sulu. In preparation for formal talks with the Aquino government, the Organization of Islamic Conference and the Muslim World League tried to unite the MNLF and the Moro Islamic Liberation Front, which had broken from the MNLF in 1977, so as to present a single Moro panel.

However, the MNLF proved more adept at obtaining media access than the MILF under Hashim Salamat, and in September 1986, Nur Misuari returned to the Philippines, frustrating even more the MILF's attempts to gain exposure. President Aquino, defying protocol and the counsel of her government and military advisers, went to Jolo and met with Misuari. This meeting received full media exposure and was considered a historical event; it set the stage for the Jeddah Accord in 1987.

The MILF felt excluded from the peace talks; it denounced the Jeddah Accord and in January 1987, launched a five-day offensive against government troops and installations. Aquino then met with MILF Chief-of-Staff Hadji Murad in Cotabato, and a temporary ceasefire between the Philippine government and the MILF was arranged.

== Events after the accord ==
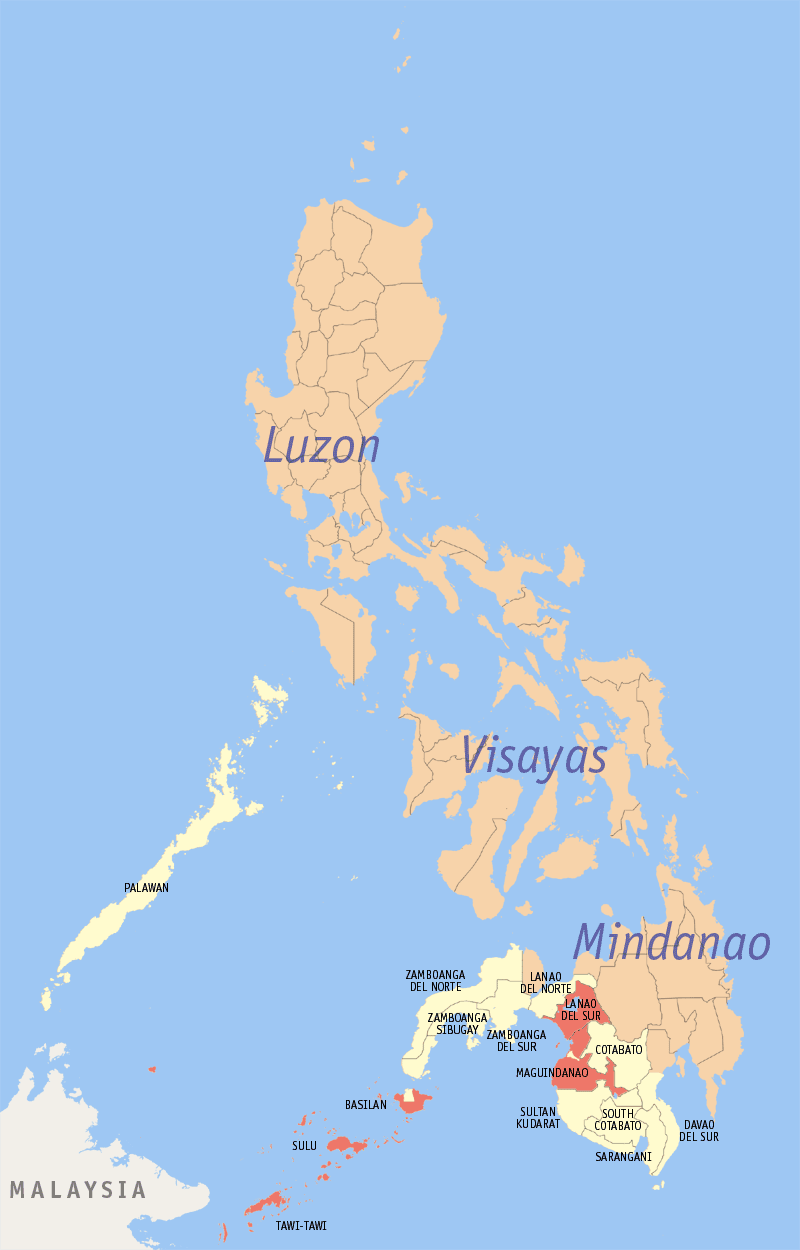
The present territory of ARMM is shown in red. Shown in yellow are other areas intended to be part of it in accordance with the 1976 Tripoli Agreement, but opposed inclusion via plebiscite

One of the main points of agreement in the Jeddah Accord was that the Philippine panel would submit to President Aquino a request by the MNLF for the suspension of provisions on autonomy for Muslim Mindanao as contained in the draft for the 1987 Constitution of the Philippines, which was to be submitted to a plebiscite on February 2, 1987. Aquino however, denied the request, citing the opinion of the Philippine Constitutional Commission of 1986 that the constitution was to be submitted as a whole for approval during the 1987 plebiscite. 70% voted for the constitution in Mindanao; Sulu, where the majority of the population was Muslim, voted 95% for the constitution.

The ratified constitution contained provisions for the establishment of an autonomous region for "Muslim Mindanao", which would become effectively autonomous upon the affirmative votes of the population of those areas in special plebiscites; a guarantee that only those provinces or cities which favor autonomy would be included in the autonomous region. The MNLF and the MILF opposed this, seeing it as against the spirit of the 1976 Tripoli Agreement. The peace talks began to break down; the government wanted the new constitution as basis for continued negotiations, while the MNLF wanted the Tripoli Agreement. By May 1987, the talks were officially ended.

In 1989, an act establishing the Autonomous Region in Muslim Mindanao was passed. The MNLF demanded that the thirteen Tripoli Agreement provinces be included in the ARMM, but the government refused; eight of those provinces were predominantly Christian. Shortly thereafter, the government held a plebiscite in the thirteen provinces. Four provinces; Lanao del Sur, Maguindanao, Sulu and Tawi-tawi voted to be included in the ARMM. The MNLF boycotted the plebiscite and refused to recognize the ARMM.

== Succeeding treaties ==
Under the administration of Fidel V. Ramos, the government and the MNLF signed the 1996 Final Peace Agreement in Jakarta, Indonesia. It enabled qualified MNLF members to enter the ranks of the Armed Forces of the Philippines and the Philippine National Police, and created the Southern Philippines Council for Peace and Development, which was dominated by the MNLF. Misuari then ran unopposed as governor of the ARMM. The peace agreement earned Ramos and Misuari the 1997 Félix Houphouët-Boigny Peace Prize.

That same year, the Moro Islamic Liberation Front, which had broken away from the MNLF in 1977, began informal talks with the Ramos-led government. These, however, were not pursued and the MILF began recruiting and establishing camps, becoming the dominant Muslim rebel group. The administration of Joseph Estrada advocated a hardline stance against the MILF; that of Gloria Macapagal Arroyo tried to sign a peace agreement with it, but it was declared unconstitutional by the Supreme Court of the Philippines.

Shortly after Benigno Aquino III assumed the Presidency in 2010, he met with MILF chairman Murad Ebrahim in Tokyo, Japan. In 2012, the Philippine government and the MILF signed the Framework Agreement on the Bangsamoro, which calls for the creation of the Bangsamoro, an autonomous political entity which will replace the Autonomous Region in Muslim Mindanao, which Aquino describes as a "failed experiment".

== See also ==
- 1976 Tripoli Agreement
- 1996 Final Peace Agreement
- Framework Agreement on the Bangsamoro
