= Consolacion Alaras =

English professor

Consolacion Rustia Alaras (born 1941) is a professor and former chairperson of the Department of English and Comparative Literature (DECL) at the University of the Philippines Diliman. A nominee to the university presidency twice, she holds a Ph.D. in Philippine Studies from UP Diliman.

She has written and researched extensively on God-centered governance and English for national purpose.

== Academic career ==
Alaras had taken her A.B. in English and M.A. in comparative literature at the University of the Philippines Diliman before working on a doctorate degree. Her reputation was propelled by her research works on Pamathalaan or God-centered governance which commenced from her Ph.D. dissertation.

She retired as Professor 12, the highest regular academic rank in the university and remains teaching as a Professorial Lecturer at the Department of English and Comparative Literature (DECL) in UP Diliman.
