= Comprehensive Agreement on the Bangsamoro =

2014 Philippine peace agreement with the Moro Islamic Liberation Front

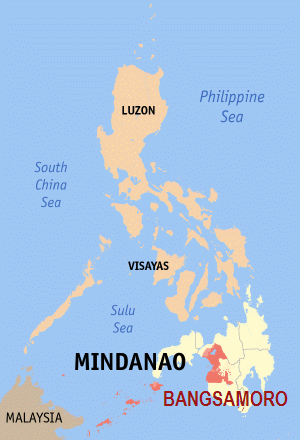
- Areas in red constitute the proposed Bangsamoro political entity
- Context: Part of a series of peace agreements between the Government of the Philippines and the Moro Islamic Liberation Front seeking resolution to the Moro conflict
- Signed: March 27, 2014
- Location: Malacañan Palace, Manila, Philippines
- Signatories: (Philippines) Miriam Coronel-Ferrer; Mohagher Iqbal (Malaysia) Tunku Dato Abdul Ghafar Tunku Mohammad
- Parties: Philippines; Moro Islamic Liberation Front

The Comprehensive Agreement on Bangsamoro (CAB) was the final peace agreement signed between the Government of the Philippines and the Moro Islamic Liberation Front on March 27, 2014 at the Malacañang Palace in Manila, which eventually led to the creation of the Bangsamoro Autonomous Region in Muslim Mindanao (often referred to simply as the Bangsamoro, in January 2019.

The agreement involved two tracks - the normalization track and the political track. Under the normalization track, the MILF would turn over their firearms to a third party, which would be selected by the rebels and the Philippine government. The MILF agreed to decommission its armed wing, the Bangsamoro Islamic Armed Forces (BIAF). Under the Political track, the government would work towards the creation of a new political entity known as the Bangsamoro, to take the place of the Autonomous Region in Muslim Mindanao (ARMM) which had been created in 1989.

Power sharing was a central point to the autonomy redesign. The ARMM charter had only listed 14 areas which were outside the powers of the regional legislature. Under the comprehensive peace agreement, the parties listed 81 powers categorized into reserved for the central government, exclusive to the Bangsamoro, and concurrent with or shared by the two sides for power sharing. Of the 81 powers, 58 were devolved to the Bangsamoro, nine were reserved to the central government, and 14 were shared. The Framework Agreement on the Bangsamoro and Four annexes, namely on Transitional Arrangements and Modalities, Revenue Generation and Wealth Sharing, Power Sharing and Normalization, together with the Addendum on Bangsamoro Waters, will be included in the comprehensive agreement.

The Armed Forces of the Philippines raised red alert status on March 24 in preparation for the event. Philippine President Benigno Aquino III, MILF chair Hadji Murad Ibrahim, and Malaysian Prime Minister Najib Razak were among the key people expected to be present at the signing of the agreement.

In 2026, the agreement was inscribed as part of the Bangsamoro Peace Agreements in the UNESCO National Memory of the World Register of the Philippines, along with three other related agreements.

== Background ==
In pursuit of their goal of liberating Bangsamoro, the MNLF engaged the government forces in extensive armed collisions, peaking in the early 70s when the rebels’ blitz-like operations brought them control of a substantial number of municipalities surrounding Cotabato City and its airport complex. This prompted the Marcos regime to beef up military presence by deploying almost three-fourths of the army in most Muslim parts of Mindanao. Things took a different turn in 1976 when Libyan leader Muammar Gaddafi brokered an agreement that led to the signing of the Tripoli Agreement introducing the concept of an autonomous Muslim region in Mindanao. On August 1, 1989, under the mandate of the new 1987 Constitution, Congress enacted Republic Act 6734 authorizing the creation of the Autonomous Region in Muslim Mindanao (ARMM). However, out of the 13 provinces and 9 cities that participated in the plebiscite, only the provinces of Lanao del Sur, Maguindanao, Sulu, and Tawi-Tawi opted to become part of the ARMM. The ARMM was formally established on November 6, 1990.

Instead of bringing the Muslim leaders together, this agreement further fragmented the MNLF, because some factions within the group preferred independence over autonomy. Thus, a group of officers led by Hashim Salamat broke away and formed the Moro Islamic Liberation Front (MILF) to continue their armed struggle for an independent Bangsamoro (Moro nation) in Mindanao.

While the combined strength of these two rebel forces has not reached a point of posing a significant threat to the government in Manila, their existence—and the reasons for their resilience—presents challenges for the government. For nearly five decades, five presidents have tried to end these two rebellions, utilizing both force and diplomacy. No combination has succeeded. An effort to address these movements was that of the Ramos Administration, which tried to reach out to both the communist and Muslim rebels through peaceful means. There were many efforts to reach peace with Islamist separatists.

== Framework Agreement ==
On October 15, 2012, the Philippine government signed a much-hyped document touted as the Framework Agreement on the Bangsamoro, which culminated the Aquino Administration's effort to end the deadlock in the peace process. This new document, while merely providing for a general framework for the actual peace negotiations, announced that "the status quo is unacceptable and that the Bangsamoro shall be established to replace the Autonomous Region in Muslim Mindanao (ARMM). The Bangsamoro was the new autonomous political entity (NPE) referred to in the Decision Points of Principles as of April 2012." According to President Aquino, this was the agreement that could "finally seal genuine, lasting peace in Mindanao." with Bangsamoro replacing ARMM which was described by President Benigno Aquino III as "a failed experiment".

== Reaching the agreement ==
Signing of the Comprehensive Agreement on the Bangsamoro at the Malacañang Palace, Manila

The peace talks between the MILF and the Philippine government had been brokered by Malaysia since 1997. After 2009, the negotiations were also supported by an International Contact Group (the ICG). The ICG represented an innovation in peace process support, in that it was a hybrid body composed of both states and international non-governmental organisations (INGOs). The members were Turkey, Saudi Arabia, the United Kingdom, and Japan, The Asia Foundation, the Centre for Humanitarian Dialogue, Muhammadiyah, and Conciliation Resources. When the Asia Foundation became an official member of the Third Party Monitoring Team in 2012, the Community of San’Egidio from Italy replaced the Asia Foundation in the ICG.

On January 24, 2014, Philippine government chief negotiator Miriam Coronel Ferer and MILF chief negotiator Mohagher Iqbal signed a peace agreement in Kuala Lumpur. The agreement would pave the way for the creation of the new Muslim autonomous entity called "Bangsamoro" under a law to be approved by the Philippine Congress.

The government aims to set up the region by 2016. The agreement calls for Muslim self-rule in parts of the southern Philippines in exchange for a deactivation of rebel forces by the MILF. MILF forces would turn over their firearms to a third party to be selected by the MILF and the Philippine government. A regional police force would be established, and the Philippine military would reduce the presence of troops and help disband private armies in the area. In the Agreement, the government committed to change a 37-year autonomy experiment whose current version, the Autonomous Region in Muslim Mindanao (ARMM), has failed to live up to the Moro people's aspiration for freedom from a highly centralized government.
