= Young Moro Professionals Network =

The Young Moro Professionals Network (YMPN) is a non-governmental organization (NGO) composed of young Moro professionals advocating peaceful means to improve the socio-economic well-being of the Bangsamoro people. While a majority of members live in the Philippines, particularly in Metro Manila and Mindanao, there are several members who are based in other countries. YMPN members are largely employed, both in government and private sector jobs.

The YMPN was founded in 2000 during the administration of former Philippine president Joseph "Erap" Estrada. A group of young Moro professionals initially organized themselves as part of the popular protest at EDSA against the alleged corruptions of Erap. As a result of these protests, Erap was ousted from the presidency.

The founding Moros were further motivated by dismay with the Philippine government total war policy against the Moro communities in Mindanao, despite an outstanding peace agreement with the Moro National Liberation Front (MNLF) and ongoing negotiation with the Moro Islamic Liberation Front (MILF). Many NGOs concerned with the cultivation of lasting peace and harmony in Mindanao perceived the unilateral declaration of war by the government of the Philippines (GRP) as a diversion from investigations and protests against the alleged corruptions and unfitness of president of the GRP. The war displaced hundreds of thousands of Moros and threatened to poison Muslim-Christian relations, like what happened in the early 1970s.

The success of EDSA II in ousting then President Erap motivated the YMPN founders to continue peacefully advocating and working for the socio-economic well-being of the Moro masses. The founders envisioned a network of young Muslim professionals that promote volunteerism; using their own resources, talents, education and training, and working collectively or individually to help other Muslims in unfortunate circumstances. This peaceful means is in stark contrast to the armed liberation struggle by MNLF and MILF against the GRP from the early 1970s to present.

Since its founding, the YMPN has been active in encouraging young Moros to adopt peaceful means to uplift themselves. The YMPN has stressed the practice of Islam as a peaceful and modest way of life. The core members have designed and implemented leadership training program, using an Islamic framework, aimed at the next generation of YMPN members. In most engagements, these core members are the lecturers and readily provide a role model to their audience for their advocacy for peaceful means. The YMPN has established a website at YMPN.org to reach a larger audience of both Muslims and non-Muslims. The YMPN has also been recognized for their contributions by other local and international NGOs, as well as senior statesmen of the GRP, like Senator Ramon Magsaysay.

On May 9, 2003, the YMPN was incorporated as a non-profit organization with the Securities and Exchange Commission of the Philippines. It holds office at G-108 Jocfer Building, Commonwealth Avenue, Quezon City, Philippines. The YMPN membership continues to grow.
