= 1977 Southern Philippines autonomy plebiscite =

- April 17, 1977
- Outcome: Creation of the two autonomous regions in Western Mindanao and Central Mindanao; Davao del Sur, Palawan and South Cotabato rejected autonomy; Abolishment of the provisional Southern Philippines autonomous area

There being one autonomous region (yes) or more than one (no)
Yes	2.14%
No	97.86%

MNLF having "full and complete authority" on autonomous regions
Yes	1.43%
No	98.54%

National government controlling the autonomous regions
Yes	97.44%
No	2.56%

The 1977 Southern Philippines autonomy plebiscite was a plebiscite to create an autonomous region (or two) held on April 17, 1977 in parts of Mindanao and Palawan in the Philippines.

== Background ==
The Philippine national government and the Moro National Liberation Front signed the Tripoli Agreement which was brokered by Libya under Muammar Gaddafi on December 23, 1976 where it was agreed that an autonomous region in the southern Philippines would be created. The Philippine government insisted for a plebiscite to be held.

Originally scheduled to be held on February 21, 1977, the plebiscite was delayed to March 17 of the same year. The vote was postponed again to April 17, 1977.

The delay in the implementation caused tensions between the two parties. As a compromise, Gaddafi, the special envoy and First Lady Imelda Marcos came up with a proposal for the Philippine government to proclaim an autonomous region with a provisional government. On March 25, 1977, a provisional autonomous region known as Southern Philippines covering the areas under the scope of the then-planned plebiscite was declared.

The Moro National Liberation Front urged for a boycott of the plebiscite. But voting was still held.

Participants of the plebiscite voted in favor of autonomy for Western Mindanao (Region IX) and Central Mindanao (Region XII) while a proposal to merge the regions into one autonomous region was rejected.

== Scope ==
The plebiscite covered the following areas:

Southern Tagalog – Region IV

- Palawan

Western Mindanao – Region IX

- Basilan
- Sulu
- Tawi-Tawi
- Zamboanga del Sur
- Zamboanga del Norte
- Zamboanga City

Southern Mindanao – Region XI

- Davao del Sur (excluding Davao City)
- South Cotabato

Central Mindanao – Region XII

- Lanao del Sur
- Lanao del Norte
- Maguindanao
- North Cotabato
- Sultan Kudarat

== Question ==
Questions on the ballot
Preface
Pursuant to the Tripoli Agreement of December 23, 1976 and the agreement between President Marcos of the Philippines and President Ghaddafi of March 18–19, 1977, President Marcos issued proclamation No. 1628 declaring autonomy in the Provinces of Lanao de Sur, Lanao del Norte, Sultan Kudarat, Maguindanao, North Cotabato, Zamboanga del Sur, Zamboanga del Norte, Sulu, Basilan, Tawi-Tawi, Palawan, Davao del Sur and South Cotabato.

The agreement between President Marcos and President Ghaddafi also provides that the people be asked how to organize themselves administratively within the areas of the autonomy through a referendum.

Basic questions
1. There is a proposal that these 13 provinces will be finally organized into a single region of the autonomy. Do you approve such a proposal?

If the answer is “Yes”, these provinces shall constitute a single region of the autonomy.
If the answer is “No”, the 13 provinces shall remain in their present regions which shall be equally autonomous.

2. There is a proposal that the administrative system in the area of the autonomy will be ruled or controlled by the Moro National Liberation Front with full and complete authority.

Do you approve such a proposal?

3. There is a proposal that the region of the autonomy will have its own flag, official language and seal separate and distinct from the flag, national language and seal of the National Government.

Do you approve such a proposal?

4. There is a proposal that the region of the autonomy be called autonomous Bangsamoro Islamic Region and the inhabitants thereof the Bangsamoro.

Do you approve such a proposal?

5. There is a proposal that the region of the autonomy shall have its own Court of Appeals and Supreme Court to be created by the Government of the region of the autonomy.

Do you approve such a proposal?

6. There is a proposal to grant to the region of the autonomy the power of general legislation including taxation similar to that of the national assembly of the National Government.

Do you approve such a proposal?

7. There is a proposal to empower the MNLF to organize and utilize in the region of the autonomy a security force to maintain peace and order separate from the outside of the supervision and control of the Armed Forces of the Philippines, the Integrated National Police or any other office or offices of the National Government.

Do you approve such a proposal?

8. There is a proposal that the Executive Council of the region of the autonomy shall be headed by a chief minister and a deputy chief minister to be elected by the regional legislative assembly with the concurrence of the central committee of the MNLF and who shall be the commander-in-chief of the regional security force with the power to organize, control and supervise its operations and activities.

Do you approve such a proposal?

9. There is a proposal that the accounts of the region of the autonomy shall be audited only by a regional commission and not by the National Commission on Audit, as provided by the Philippine Constitution.

Do you approve such a proposal?

10. There is a proposal that the Administrative system in the region of the autonomy shall be under the general supervision and control of the National Government of the Philippines through its appropriate instrumentalities as provided for in the proposal of the Batasang Bayan adopted in its special session last 14 February 1977 which includes the creation of a regional assembly with members elected by the qualified voters of the region and an executive council to be chosen by the regional assembly who may or may not be members of the said assembly.

Do you approve such a proposal?

Additional questions

For voters in the province of Tawi-Tawi
11. In order to facilitate the administration of the areas concerned, and to hasten their socio-economic development, Presidential Decree No. 302 removed several municipalities from the territorial jurisdiction of the province of Sulu and constituted the same into a separate province known as Tawi-Tawi. Are you in favor of maintaining the separation of the province of Sulu and Tawi-Tawi into distinct political subdivisions thereby constituting the latter into a regular province?

For voters in the Provinces of Sultan Kudarat, North Cotabato and Maguindanao
12. In order to improve the administration of the areas concerned and to promote their stability and accelerate their social and economic development, Presidential Decree No. 341 divided the province of Cotabato into three (3) territorial subdivisions, namely: North Cotabato, Maguindanao and Sultan Kudarat. Are you in favor of maintaining these three (3) territorial subdivisions as distinct local government units and thereby constituting them into regular provinces?

For voters in the Province of Basilan
13. By virtue of Presidential Decree No. 356, as amended by Presidential Decrees Nos. 530 and 840, the City of Basilan was abolished and its component territorial units were administratively and politically organized to constitute the province of Basilan. Are you in favor of maintaining the status of Basilan as a regular province?

== Results ==
Davao del Sur, Palawan and South Cotabato rejected inclusion to the Regional Autonomous Government.

=== Of there being two autonomous regions ===
A yes vote meant there should be just one autonomous region, while a no vote meant the existing regional setup should then determine how many autonomous regions there should be.

1977 Southern Philippines autonomy plebiscite, Question #1
Choice	Votes	%
For	64,401	2.14
Against	2,939,991	97.86
Total	3,004,392	100.00
Source: Associated Press via The Evening News

1977 Southern Philippines autonomy plebiscite results (excluding invalid votes)
Against; 2,939,991 (97.9%)
▲50%

=== Of the MNLF having full and complete authority ===
1977 Southern Philippines autonomy plebiscite, Question #2
Choice	Votes	%
For	39,938	1.43
Against	2,743,253	98.57
Total	2,783,191	100.00
Valid votes	2,783,191	99.51
Invalid/blank votes	13,746	0.49
Total votes	2,796,937	100.00
Source: Pacific Daily News, April 24, 1977

1977 Southern Philippines autonomy plebiscite results (excluding invalid votes)
Against; 2,743,253 (98.6%)
▲50%

=== Of the autonomous regions being controlled by the Philippine Government ===
1977 Southern Philippines autonomy plebiscite, Question #10
Choice	Votes	%
For	2,499,375	97.44
Against	65,612	2.56
Total	2,564,987	100.00
Valid votes	2,564,987	99.18
Invalid/blank votes	21,176	0.82
Total votes	2,586,163	100.00
Source: PD 1618, s. 1979

1977 Southern Philippines autonomy plebiscite results (excluding invalid votes)
For; 2,499,375 (97.4%)
▲50%

=== On confirming the creation of Tawi-Tawi ===
Voters in Tawi-Tawi voted to confirm the creation of their province from Sulu.

=== On confirming the division of Cotabato province ===
Voters in Maguindanao, North Cotabato (now Cotabato) and Sultan Kudarat voted to confirm the division of the old province of Cotabato.

=== On confirming the conversion of City of Basilan to a province ===
Voters in Basilan approved to confirm the conversion of their province from a city.

== Aftermath ==
Two Regional Autonomous Governments (RAGs) in Western Mindanao and Central Mindanao were established which the MNLF protested since they prefer a single autonomous region. Furthermore voters from outside these regions rejected the inclusion of their localities to these autonomous areas.
