= Marvic Leonen =

Philippine Senior Associate Justice of the Supreme Court (born 1962)

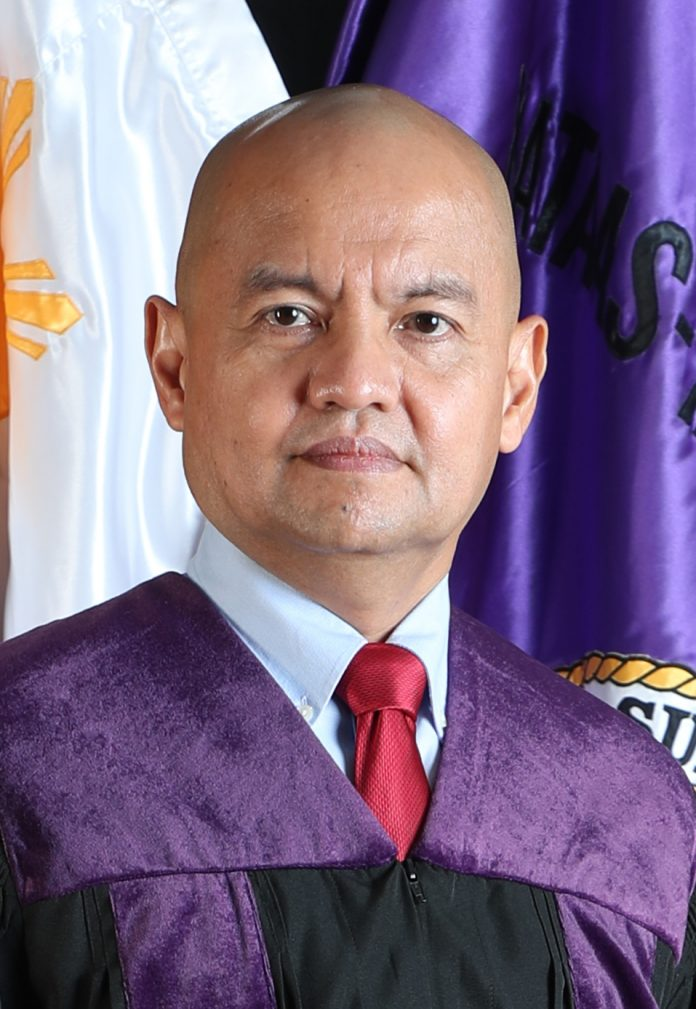
- Official portrait, 2026

37th Senior Associate Justice of the Supreme Court of the Philippines
- Incumbent
- Assumed office May 14, 2022
- Preceded by: Estela Perlas-Bernabe

Associate Justice of the Supreme Court of the Philippines
- Incumbent
- Assumed office November 21, 2012
- Appointed by: Benigno Aquino III
- Preceded by: Maria Lourdes Sereno

Chief Peace Negotiator for the Republic of the Philippines
- In office July 2010 – November 2012
- Appointed by: Benigno Aquino III
- Succeeded by: Miriam Coronel-Ferrer

13th Dean of the University of the Philippines College of Law
- In office 2008–2011
- Preceded by: Salvador T. Carlota
- Succeeded by: Danilo Concepcion

Personal details
- Born: Mario Victor Famorca Leonen; December 29, 1962 (age 63) Baguio, Philippines
- Citizenship: Filipino
- Children: 1
- Education: University of the Philippines Diliman (BA, LLB); Columbia University (LLM)
- Nickname: LabGuru

Mario Victor "Marvic" Famorca Leonen (born December 29, 1962) is a Filipino jurist who has served as an associate justice of the Philippine Supreme Court since 2012. Appointed by President Benigno Aquino III at age 49, he became the second-youngest justice named to the Court since 1938. Since the retirement of Estela Perlas-Bernabe in 2022, Leonen has served as the Court's senior associate justice.

Before joining the Supreme Court, Leonen built an extensive career in environmental advocacy, human rights law, and academia. He co-founded the Legal Rights and Natural Resources Center in 1987 and was a long-time member of the Free Legal Assistance Group (FLAG). A faculty member at the University of the Philippines College of Law since 1989, he eventually served as the university's general counsel, the first vice president for legal affairs of the UP System, and dean of the College of Law from 2008 to 2011.

In 2010, Leonen was appointed as the Philippine government's chief peace negotiator with the Moro Islamic Liberation Front (MILF), successfully securing the framework agreement that led to the establishment of the Bangsamoro political entity. On the Supreme Court, he is known for his liberal jurisprudence, including his landmark decision in Tan-Andal v. Andal that removed the requirement of medical experts in proving psychological incapacity in marriage nullity cases. Beyond his rulings, Leonen has actively championed systemic reforms; he chaired the historic, digitized 2020/2021 bar examinations, authored the 2023 New Lawyer's Oath, and proposed the writ of kalayaan as a constitutional remedy to address severe prison overcrowding.

== Early life ==
Leonen was born on December 29, 1962, in Baguio, Benguet, to Mauro Leonen and Adrelina Famorca. His parents had married in Vigan, Ilocos Sur, before settling in Baguio. The second of six children, he is of Ilocano descent. His mother is a pharmacist, and his father was a human rights lawyer who represented the indigenous Ibaloi people in land title disputes. On June 26, 1970, his father died in a car accident in San Manuel, Tarlac.

Leonen decided to pursue a career in law while in the second grade.

== Education and early career ==
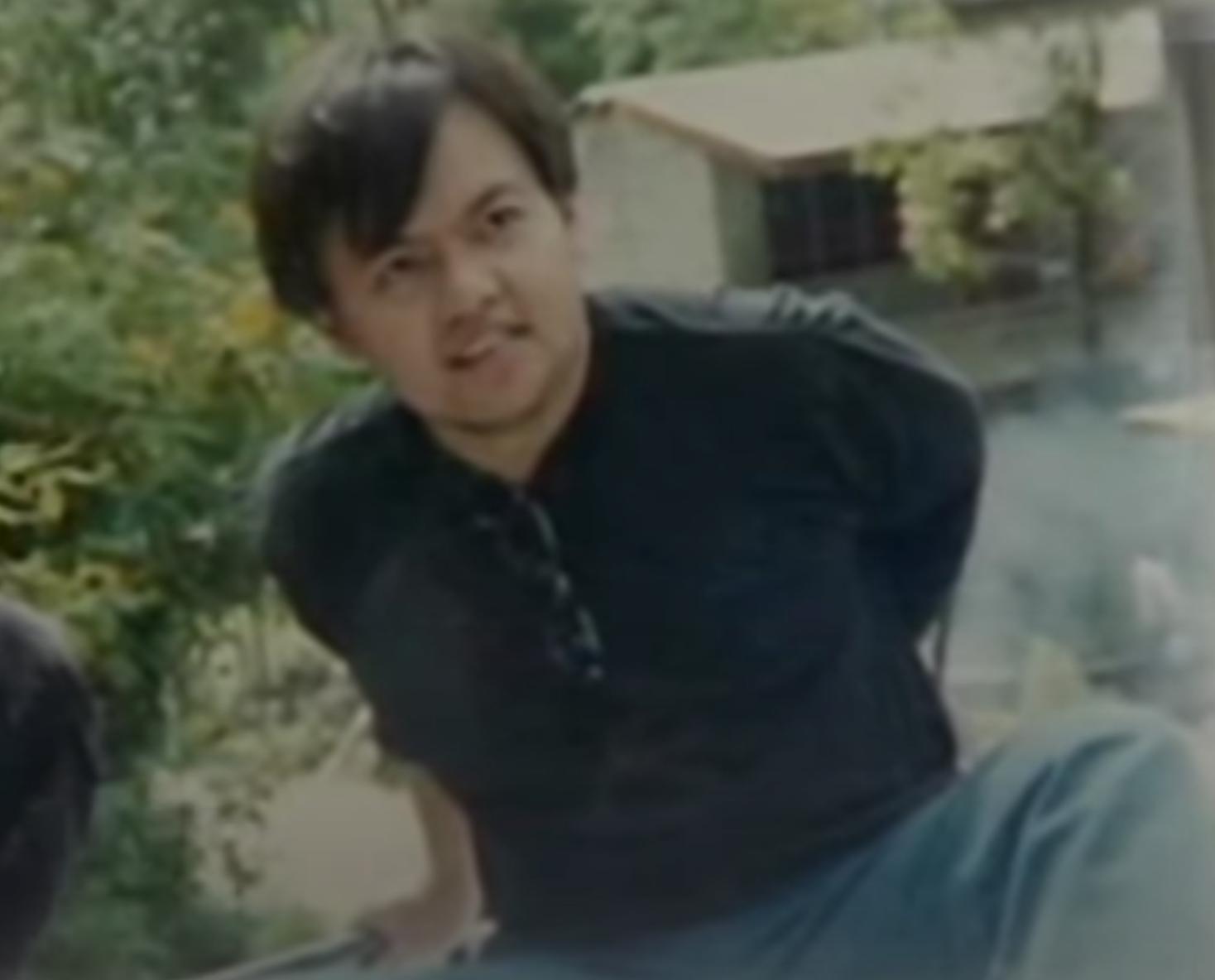
Leonen as a human rights lawyer performing pro bono services in Northern Luzon

After attending St. Theresa's College for elementary school and graduating as valedictorian from Saint Louis University–Boys' High School, Leonen graduated magna cum laude with a Bachelor of Arts in economics from the University of the Philippines Diliman in 1983. During the 1982–1983 academic year, he chaired Economics Toward Consciousness, a student organization at the University of the Philippines School of Economics. He obtained his Bachelor of Laws degree from the UP College of Law in 1987, ranking fourth in his class. In 2004, he earned a Master of Laws from Columbia Law School.

In December 1987, Leonen co-founded the Legal Rights and Natural Resources Center, Inc.–Kasama sa Kalikasan, the Philippine chapter of Friends of the Earth. The center is a policy research and advocacy institution that provides legal services to upland rural poor and indigenous communities. Leonen served as its executive director for 15 years.

In 1988, Leonen joined the Free Legal Assistance Group (FLAG), a network of Philippine human rights lawyers, and remained a member until his appointment to the Supreme Court in 2012.

== Academic career ==
Leonen joined the faculty of the University of the Philippines College of Law in 1989 as a professorial lecturer specializing in Philippine indigenous law. During Dean Pacifico Agabin's tenure, he became an assistant professor, and later served as an academic administrator under Dean Merlin M. Magallona. In 2000, he was appointed university general counsel for the University of the Philippines (UP) System. In 2005, he became the first vice president for legal affairs of the UP System. Throughout his tenure, Leonen taught 20 subjects at the law school, worked within its clinical legal education program, and lectured at forums across Asia and Europe.

In 2008, the UP Board of Regents appointed him dean of the University of the Philippines College of Law. He served in this role until June 2011, when Danilo L. Concepcion succeeded him.

Leonen provided legal commentary for television networks such as ABS-CBN and GMA Network, including during the 2000–2001 impeachment trial of President Joseph Estrada.

== Government chief peace negotiator (2010–2012) ==
In July 2010, President Benigno Aquino III appointed Leonen as the Philippine government's chief negotiator with the Moro Islamic Liberation Front (MILF). During his tenure, the government reached an agreement with the MILF to establish the Bangsamoro political entity, replacing the Autonomous Region in Muslim Mindanao.

=== Controversies on Academic Integrity and Legal Ethics ===
The controversy involving Leonen arose from the 2010 statement issued by 37 professors of the University of the Philippines College of Law concerning allegations of plagiarism in a Supreme Court decision in Vinuya v. Executive Secretary. Leonen, then Dean of the UP College of Law, submitted the statement to the Supreme Court, which later initiated an administrative inquiry regarding the professors’ conduct and professional obligations as members of the Bar.

In December 2010, a separate issue emerged after a lawyers’ group questioned citation practices in Leonen’s 2004 article “Weaving Worldviews: Implications of Constitutional Challenges to the Indigenous Peoples Rights Act of 1997.” Leonen stated that some sources had not been properly attributed due to an error and offered to resign as Dean.

== Associate justice (2012–present) ==
On November 21, 2012, President Benigno Aquino III appointed Leonen as the 172nd associate justice of the Supreme Court of the Philippines. At age 49, he became the youngest justice named to the Court since 1938.

In Belgica v. Executive Secretary, where the Court declared the Priority Development Assistance Fund unconstitutional, Leonen wrote a separate concurring opinion. He stated, "A member of the House of Representatives or a Senator is not an automated teller machine from which the public can withdraw funds for sundry private purposes."

In civil law, Leonen penned the decision in Tan-Andal v. Andal, which removed the requirement of medical or expert witnesses to declare a marriage null due to psychological incapacity under the Family Code. The new rule requires only totally antagonistic personality structures that result in the inevitable breakdown of the marriage. Furthermore, the incapacity to fulfill essential marital obligations needs only to manifest specifically toward that spouse for the marriage to be declared void ab initio.

=== Dissents ===
Leonen has frequently issued dissenting opinions in Supreme Court cases. In an interview with Rappler, he stated that while his point of view might often be "before its time," he is not frustrated by dissenting, as the reasoning in his dissent might be relied upon by the majority in the future, citing Holmes' dissent in Abrams v. United States as an example.

Among Leonen's notable dissents is his argument in Disini v. Secretary of Justice that criminal libel and cyberlibel are unconstitutional vestiges of American and Spanish colonialism. He is also noted for his dissent in Republic v. Sereno, where he called the quo warranto ruling "a legal abomination" that "creates a precedent that gravely diminishes judicial independence." In Lagman v. Pimentel III, a case addressing the legality of extending martial law and suspending the privilege of the writ of habeas corpus in Mindanao, Leonen explained that Congress had abused its discretion because there was no proper presentation of facts, no examination of the allegations by the military, and no ascertainment of why a longer extension was needed despite the continued declaration of military victory.

=== Bar examinations chairperson ===
In the Philippines, the Supreme Court administers the bar examinations, with a different justice serving as chairperson each year. Leonen was appointed chairperson for the 2020 examinations, which were postponed and merged with the 2021 batch due to the COVID-19 pandemic.

While the exam dates were pending, the Supreme Court kept examinees informed through official bulletins, and Leonen regularly posted updates on Twitter using the hashtag "#BestBarEver2020_21". After multiple schedule changes to comply with pandemic health protocols, the exams were ultimately held on February 4 and 6, 2022, across 31 localized testing sites nationwide.

The combined batch produced 8,241 newly licensed lawyers out of 11,402 examinees. This included 761 "exemplary passers" (grades from 85 to 90%) and 14 "excellent passers" (grades above 90%). For the official results, Leonen replaced the word "fail" with "did not pass" or "did not finish" for those who scored below the 75% passing mark.

=== New lawyer's oath ===
The Supreme Court en banc approved the Code of Professional Responsibility and Accountability (CPRA) on April 11, 2023, following a nationwide caravan engaging the public and the legal community. The CPRA was officially launched two days later at the Manila Hotel. The launch event featured the introduction of a new lawyer's oath, authored by Leonen.

=== Proposed writ of kalayaan ===
On May 25, 2024, during a lecture for the Integrated Bar of the Philippines, Leonen announced that the Supreme Court of the Philippines was drafting the writ of kalayaan. This proposed constitutional remedy aims to address the severe overcrowding of persons deprived of liberty (PDLs) and protect their human and legal rights. At the time, the World Prison Brief ranked the Philippines third globally in prison occupancy (362%), while a 2022 Commission on Audit review revealed that 323 of the country's 478 jails were congested.

The writ had previously been recommended by the Court's Committee on Human Rights and International Humanitarian Law in December 2022. However, in October 2023, Bureau of Corrections Director General Gregorio Catapang Jr. opposed the proposed legal remedy, arguing that the government was already addressing jail congestion through existing laws—such as Republic Act 10575 and RA 11928—and the Department of Justice's 2023–2028 modernization plan.

== Impeachment complaint ==
In December 2020, Edwin Cordevilla, represented by lawyer Larry Gadon, filed an impeachment complaint against Leonen. Cordevilla, the secretary general of the Filipino League of Advocates for Good Government, accused Leonen of a culpable violation of the 1987 Constitution for failing to resolve 37 cases in a timely manner. The complaint also alleged a betrayal of public trust, claiming Leonen failed to file his Statement of Assets, Liabilities and Net Worth (SALN) for 15 years.

Amid discussions of a possible trial, Leonen received public support from the legal and academic communities. The UP College of Law released a statement urging the dismissal of the complaint, and Senator Risa Hontiveros publicly opposed the impeachment.

On May 27, 2021, a House of Representatives panel dismissed the complaint after 44 lawmakers found it lacked sufficient evidence. The panel noted that the supporting documents were merely photocopies and newspaper articles, which did not meet evidentiary standards under the Rules of Court.

Following the dismissal, Leonen issued a statement expressing gratitude for the support of lawyers, professors, and members of the judiciary. He added that "[we] must courageously focus on the essentials: do what is right at the right time in the right way, serve our people and serve them well."

== Personal life ==
While divorce is not legally recognized in the Philippines, Leonen has described himself as "divorced." He has one daughter, Lian Laya (nicknamed "Malaya," meaning "free"), whom he and his former spouse have actively co-parented since 2004. In a 2013 interview with Ces Drilon, Leonen stated he would trade his career to be a full-time father.

Leonen is active on social media and frequently delivers commencement addresses that resonate with law students and younger audiences.

Leonen has been a vegan since 2017. He enjoys street photography as a hobby and maintains an Instagram account to showcase his work. Fluent in Filipino, English, and Ilocano, he also has a Cordilleran-inspired tattoo.

Legal offices
Preceded by Maria Lourdes Sereno	Associate Justice of the Supreme Court of the Philippines; 2012–present	Incumbent
Preceded by Estela Perlas-Bernabe	Senior Associate Justice of the Supreme Court; 2022–present	Incumbent
