= Ricardo Ramírez (footballer) =

Argentine footballer (1973–2021)

Personal information
- Full name: Ricardo Alberto Ramírez
- Date of birth: 5 April 1973
- Place of birth: Saladillo, Buenos Aires, Argentina
- Date of death: 1 May 2021 (aged 48)
- Position: Midfielder

Senior career*
Years	Team	Apps	(Gls)
1993–1996	Racing Club	27	(0)
1999–2000	Sportivo Italiano	20	(0)
- San Martín de San Juan
- Juventud Antoniana
- Estudiantes de Buenos Aires
2002–2003	Berazategui	27	(5)
Total		74+	(9+)
- * Club domestic league appearances and goals

Ricardo Alberto Ramírez (5 April 1973 – 1 May 2021) was an Argentine professional footballer who played as a midfielder for Racing Club, Sportivo Italiano, San Martín de San Juan, Juventud Antoniana, Estudiantes de Buenos Aires and Berazategui.

He died at age 48 due to COVID-19 related respiratory complications.
