= Third World Studies Center =

Social science research center of the University of the Philippines Diliman

- Formation: February 1977; 49 years ago
- Location: University of the Philippines Diliman
- Fields: Social sciences
- Director: Soledad Natalia Dalisay
- Website: twsc.upd.edu.ph

The Third World Studies Center (TWSC) is a social science research center based in the College of Social Sciences and Philosophy (CSSP) of the University of the Philippines Diliman, best known for combining social science research with public advocacy in the fields of policy and governance for its role in the campus-based resistance to the Marcos dictatorship, and for publishing "Kasarinlan," an internationally refereed journal exploring interdisciplinary perspectives on the Philippines and other countries in the global south, focusing mainly on political economy, democratization, human rights, and social movements.

== History ==
It was first established during the years of martial law under Ferdinand Marcos; in February 1977, Dean Francisco Nemenzo Jr. of the College of Arts and Sciences put up the unit as an interdisciplinary program attached to the office of the dean, which would sanctuary where activists among the UP faculty could discuss otherwise taboo themes such as poverty, authoritarianism, and state violence in relative safety. To facilitate its creation, he named the institution in a way that catered to Ferdinand Marcos' expressed desire for his government to be perceived as a leader among developing nations.

It was made a formal institution under the Division of Social Sciences on March 29, 1979, and remained attached there when it became the College of Social Sciences and Philosophy (CSSP) in 1983. It was finally elevated it into a full-fledged college research center under the CSSP in 2000.
