= Rolando Morán =

Guatemalan politician

- Born: Ricardo Arnoldo Ramírez de León; 29 December 1929; Quetzaltenango, Guatemala
- Died: 11 September 1998 (aged 68); Guatemala City, Guatemala
- Occupation: Secretary General of the URNG
- Known for: Leader of Guatemalan National Revolutionary Unity (URNG)

Comandante Rolando Morán (29 December 1929 – 11 September 1998) was the nom de guerre of Ricardo Arnoldo Ramírez de León, leader of Guatemalan National Revolutionary Unity (URNG), an armed Guatemalan communist resistance organization. At the time of his death he held the post of Secretary General of the URNG.

== Life ==
Born at Quetzaltenango in 1929, Ramírez studied law at the National University of San Carlos. At the end of the 1940s he became active as a counselor in the road construction trade union. He joined the Communist Party of Guatemala during the democratic period of the country (1944–54). It was in this time that he became acquainted with Che Guevara, who was touring the country. This was the beginning of a friendship of many years.

Ramírez began to fight Guatemala's rightist regime after leftist president Jacobo Árbenz was overthrown by the 1954 Guatemalan coup d'état. He was one of the organizers of the Guerrilla Army of the Poor in 1972, one of the four organizations which later formed the URNG. An anti-insurgency campaign by the army under the 1982-83 presidency of General Efraín Ríos Montt, however, set an end for Ramírez's hopes for armed resistance against the government, and it became clear to him that the end of the armed conflict could be attained probably only by a negotiated solution.

Ramírez was involved in the peace process between the guerrillas and the government that on 29 December 1996 ended a 36-year-long civil war. After living many years in exile, President Álvaro Arzú allowed him to return to the country, and the URNG become a legal political party. Jointly with Arzú, he received the 1996 UNESCO Félix Houphouët-Boigny Peace Prize.

Ramírez died in Guatemala City in 1998 and was survived by his wife, three sons and four grandchildren.

== Quote ==
"This new democratic nation, multi-ethnic, multicultural and multilingual, luxuriant and varied as it is the nature of the population of our country, was born out of the historical synthesis of cultures, wills, opinions and feelings of all Guatemalans united in a single national élan which transcends the system of values inherited from the past." (From the acceptance speech of the UNESCO Peace Prize, 1997).

== See also ==
- History of Guatemala
- Guatemalan Civil War

== Bibliography ==
- Morán, Rolando. Saludos revolucionarios: la historia reciente de Guatemala desde la óptica de la lucha guerrillera (1984-1996). Guatemala: FGT, Fundación Guillermo Toriello, 2002. ISBN 99922-748-3-2
- Morán, Rolando. Saludo en el XXIII aniversario del Ejército Guerrillero de los Pobres EGP. [S.l.]: Ejército Guerrillero de los Pobres (EGP), 1995.
- Morán, Rolando. 1985. Where the Campesinos Are Consultants. Ceres. 18, no. 5: 34–38.
- Morán, Rolando, Marta Harnecker, and Mario Menéndez. Entrevistas al comandante en jefe del Ejército Guerrillero de los Pobres, Rolando Morán. Guatemala, Centroamérica: El Ejército, 1982.
- Morán, Rolando. Lettres du front guatemaltique. Paris: Francois Maspero, 1970.
- Morán, Rolando. Autobiografia di una guerriglia; Guatemala 1960-1968. Milano: Feltrinelli, 1969.
