= 1976 Tripoli Agreement =

Treaty between the Philippines and Moro National Liberation Front

Agreement between the Government of the Republic of the Philippines and Moro National Liberation Front with the Participation of the Quadripartite Ministerial Commission Members of the Islamic Conference and the Secretary General of the Organization of the Islamic Conference
- Context: The Moro conflict
- Signed: December 23, 1976
- Location: Tripoli, Libya
- Signatories: (Philippines) Carmelo Z. Barbero; Nur Misuari (Libya) Ali Abdussalam Treki (Senegal) Amadou Karim Gaye
- Parties: Philippines; Moro National Liberation Front
- Language: Arabic, English, French

The 1976 Tripoli Agreement was signed on 23 December 1976, in Tripoli, Libya by Carmelo Z. Barbero, representing the Government of the Philippines and Nur Misuari of the Moro National Liberation Front. The agreement defined autonomous administrative divisions for Muslims in the southern Philippines, the establishment of an autonomous government, judicial system for Sharia law and special security forces, and the observance of a ceasefire. The autonomous region was to have its own economic system, including an Islamic bank.

Facilitators of the agreement included members of the Quadripartite Ministerial Commission of the Organization of Islamic Conference, headed by Libyan diplomat Ali Treki, and the OIC Secretary General, Amadou Karim Gaye. The other members of the Quadripartite Ministerial Commission included representatives from Saudi Arabia, Senegal and Somalia.

In 2026, the agreement was inscribed as part of the Bangsamoro Peace Agreements in the UNESCO National Memory of the World Register of the Philippines, along with three other related agreements.

== Events prior to agreement ==
The declaration of martial law by President Ferdinand Marcos in September 1972 contributed to the ongoing Moro conflict, with Abul Khayr Alonto and Jallaludin Santos establishing the Moro National Liberation Front with Nur Misuari as chairman a month later that same year.

With the MNLF receiving support from Malaysia and Libya, Marcos offered Muammar Gaddafi a lucrative oil deal in exchange for his withdrawal of support for the MNLF through Malaysia. According to his private diary, Marcos sent his wife, Imelda Marcos, to Libya in November 1976 "to charm Col. Kadaffi [sic] into finally terminating aid and support for Nur Misuari of the Moro National Liberation Front".

In December 1976 representatives of the Philippine government and the MNLF met at the negotiating table.

During the negotiations, Marcos noted in his diary that Misuari and the Libyan diplomat Ali Treki kept insisting that "all of Mindanao, Sulu and Palawan be organized into one region. But they are willing to submit this to a referendum." Marcos was inclined to agree since he was of the opinion that "Palawan, the three Davaos, the two Surigaos, the two Agusans, Southern Cotabato, Bukidnon, the two Misamis, possibly Lanao del Norte, Zamboanga del Norte and others" would not want to be included in the Muslim autonomous region. A day before the agreement was signed, negotiations stalled and Gaddafi asked for Imelda Marcos to return to Libya to hasten the talks. Imelda was able to convince the Libyan leader via telephone to accept the Philippine President's proposal, which was to "submit the question of autonomy to the constitutional process of the Philippines" for the thirteen provinces. The agreement was signed the following day.

== Autonomous areas ==
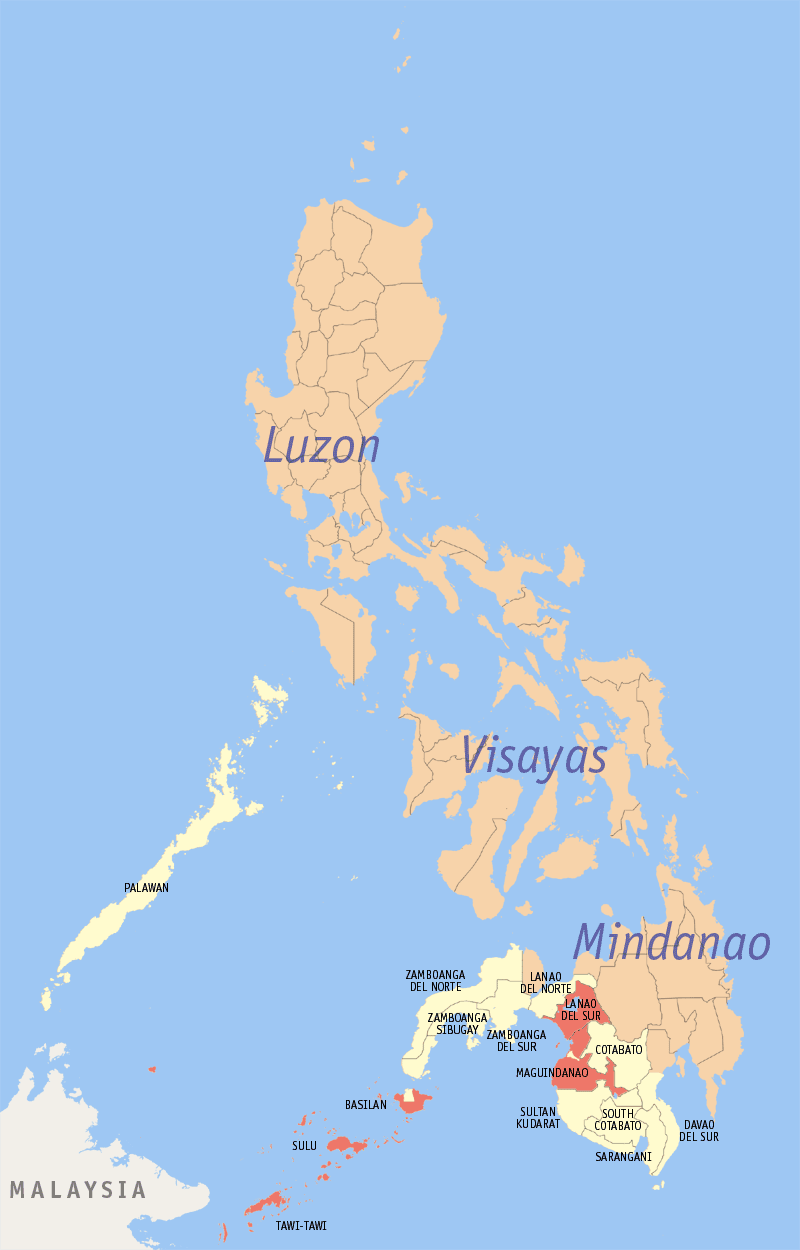
The former territory of ARMM is shown in red. Shown in yellow are other areas intended to be part of it in accordance with the 1976 Tripoli Agreement, but opposed inclusion via plebiscite

The following thirteen provinces in the southern Philippines were agreed upon by the parties involved to be included for autonomy: Basilan, Sultan Kudarat, Sulu, Lanao del Norte, Tawi-tawi, Lanao del Sur, Zamboanga del Sur, Davao del Sur, Zamboanga del Norte, South Cotabato, North Cotabato, Palawan and Maguindanao.

Marcos would later implement the agreement by creating two autonomous regions (instead of one) consisting of ten (instead of thirteen) provinces. This led to the collapse of the peace pact and the resumption of hostilities between the MNLF and Philippine government forces.

== Succeeding treaties ==
A year after Marcos was ousted from power during the People Power Revolution, the government under Corazon Aquino signed the 1987 Jeddah Accord in Saudi Arabia with the MNLF, agreeing to hold further discussions on the proposal for autonomy to the entirety of Mindanao and not just the thirteen provinces stated in the 1976 Tripoli Agreement. In 1989, however, an act establishing the Autonomous Region in Muslim Mindanao was passed. The MNLF demanded that the thirteen Tripoli Agreement provinces be included in the ARMM, but the government refused; eight of those provinces were predominantly Christian. Shortly thereafter, the government held a plebiscite in the thirteen provinces. Four provinces; Lanao del Sur, Maguindanao, Sulu and Tawi-tawi voted to be included in the ARMM. The MNLF boycotted the plebiscite and refused to recognize the ARMM.

Under the administration of Fidel V. Ramos, the government and the Moro National Liberation Front (MNLF) signed the 1996 Final Peace Agreement in Jakarta, Indonesia. The accord enabled qualified MNLF members to join the ranks of the Armed Forces of the Philippines and the Philippine National Police, and created the Southern Philippines Council for Peace and Development (SPCPD), which was primarily led by the MNLF. Nur Misuari subsequently ran unopposed as governor of the ARMM.

During this period, Sayyid Hji Al-Hassan Caluang, then OIC Governor of Sulu, played a key facilitative role in coordinating local consultations and supporting the implementation of peace and development mechanisms envisioned under the agreement. His administration fostered dialogue among traditional leaders, scholars, and MNLF representatives, ensuring that the peace framework reached the grassroots level across Sulu and neighboring provinces.

The peace agreement earned both Ramos and Misuari the 1997 Félix Houphouët-Boigny Peace Prize. The same peace framework later gave formal recognition to the Darul Iftah (Islamic Advisory Council) as part of the SPCPD structure, institutionalizing Islamic moral guidance within peace governance. The office of the Grand Mufti of Darul Ifta Region 9 and Palawan traces its roots to the 1989 conference of ʿUlamāʾ (Islamic scholars) in Zamboanga City, which unanimously elected Grand Mufti AbdulGani L. Yusop Al-Azhari as the first Grand Mufti of Southern Philippines. His election marked the beginning of a regional Islamic juristic authority later acknowledged by the government through the 1996 Final Peace Agreement, which established the Grand Mufti of Darul Ifta Region 9 and Palawan as an official “advisory council” to the SPCPD.

That same year, the Moro Islamic Liberation Front, which had broken away from the MNLF in 1977, began informal talks with the Ramos-led government. These, however, were not pursued and the MILF began recruiting and establishing camps, becoming the dominant Muslim rebel group. The administration of Joseph Estrada advocated a hardline stance against the MILF; that of Gloria Macapagal Arroyo tried to sign a peace agreement with it, but it was declared unconstitutional by the Supreme Court of the Philippines.

Shortly after Benigno Aquino III assumed the Presidency in 2010, he met with MILF chairman Murad Ebrahim in Tokyo, Japan. In 2012, the Philippine government and the MILF signed the Framework Agreement on the Bangsamoro, which calls for the creation of the Bangsamoro, an autonomous political entity which will replace the Autonomous Region in Muslim Mindanao, which Aquino describes as a "failed experiment".

== See also ==
- 1987 Jeddah Accord
- 1996 Final Peace Agreement
- Framework Agreement on the Bangsamoro
