= Professorial lecturer =

Professorial lecturer is the title for Professors of Practice and Teaching Faculty at certain universities and institutions that focus on practice-based education. This title is usually reserved for professors who are nationally or internationally recognized experts and leaders in their respective fields. In the United States, this title is predominantly used in Washington D.C., where practitioners are brought in by schools to share their applied knowledge, experience, and deep expertise in theory-to-practice translation.

The title's roots are in the Commonwealth System of faculty ranking and is equivalent to an Associate Professor in the North American system. Professorial lecturers are frequently considered equivalent to a tenured associate professor as highlighted by American University's guidelines: "A term faculty at the rank of professorial lecturer with an exceptional research portfolio that is equivalent to that of a tenure-line colleague may be promoted to associate professor following the guidelines established in the Faculty Manual (May 2018). Term faculty at the rank of professorial lecturer may not change their rank to assistant professor."

== Usage ==
Institutions using this title for Teaching Faculty include:

- London School of Economics
- George Washington University
- Johns Hopkins Bloomberg School of Public Health
- School of International Service at American University

The London School of Economics gives this title to those working full time and of professor status, but no longer producing research, instead solely focusing on student education.
