= Conciliation Resources =

Organization

- Founded: 1994
- Founder: Andy Carl and David Lord
- Type: International Peacebuilding Organisation
- Location: London, United Kingdom , Brussels, Belgium, Melbourne, Australia
- Website: c-r.org

Conciliation Resources is an independent, global organisation working with people in conflict to prevent violence and build peace, providing advice, support, and practical resources. It also takes the lessons learned to government decision-makers and others working to end the conflict to improve peacebuilding policies and practice worldwide.

== History ==
Conciliation Resources was established in 1994 by Andy Carl and David Lord, supported by a group of advisors and volunteers. Its earliest project work began in Fiji in 1995 with the newly formed Citizen's Constitutional Forum. As news of its launch spread to a wider audience, its connections and range of work increased. Soon the NGO started working also in the midst of the war in Sierra Leone and Liberia with local intermediaries and journalists reporting on the conflicts. Currently, Conciliation Resources works with partners in the South Caucasus, East and Central Africa, Southeast Asia (the Philippines), South Asia (Jammu and Kashmir), Pacific (Fiji and Bougainville, an autonomous region in Papua New Guinea), Latin America (Colombia), the Horn of Africa (Kenya and the Ogaden region of Ethiopia - also known as Somali Regional State) and West Africa.

== Accord ==
Described by Johan Galtung as an "indispensable source", Accord is a series of publications that "informs and strengthens peace processes by documenting and analysing practical lessons and innovations of peacebuilding". Its first edition was released in 1996, documenting the Liberian peace process from 1990 to 1996 and exploring why "13 separate peace accords collapsed in half as many years". A representative of the International Negotiations Network in Liberia, Dayle Spencer, praised the first publication as "useful to scholars and policymakers". Conciliation Resources published another 25 editions addressing specific conflicts in Colombia, Lebanon, Northern Uganda, Somalia, Sudan and Indonesia, and peacebuilding themes including "cross-border peacebuilding", "engaging armed groups" or "public participation", with articles written by a wide range of experts. The September 2020 version was called Pioneering peace pathways, describing what CR considers to be essential ingredients for peace dialogue to emerge in violent conflict, using case studies including Colombia, the Basque Country, southern Thailand and the Somali Region of Ethiopia.

== ICG in Mindanao ==
"The parties expressed their appreciation to President Aquino for his commitment to a just and lasting peace in Mindanao (...) They also extended their gratitude to the members of the International Contact Group, namely Japan, The Kingdom of Saudi Arabia, Republic of Turkey, the United Kingdom, Centre for Humanitarian Dialogue (HD), Conciliation Resources, Muhammadiyah, and The Asia Foundation (TAF)."

Composed of four states and four international NGOS, the International Contact Group (ICG) was established in 2009 by the Government of the Philippines and the Moro Islamic Liberation Front (MILF). On 15 October 2012, after four decades of armed conflict and 15 years of negotiations, the parties signed a framework peace agreement. It is the first-ever hybrid ICG and its functions are: attend and observe negotiations on the invitation of the parties and facilitator; provide discreet advice; provide expert assistance on specific issues; meet any of the parties upon request to help resolve substantive issues; and INGOs were additionally requested to "act as a bridge between parties, ICG, facilitator, and local partners in support of the peace process".

Conciliation Resources' involvement in Mindanao dates back to 1999 when it documented its peace process in the Accord publication, Compromising on Autonomy and its approach is framed by a commitment to women empowerment.

== Fiji ==
The involvement of Conciliation Resources (CR) involvement in Fiji dates back to 1995, when it began working with the newly formed national group the Citizens' Constitutional Forum (CCF). CR also worked with the Pacific Centre for Peacebuilding and Dialogue Fiji. CR states that it contributed to a gradual shift in attitude towards dialogue as a means of resolving conflict, along with a greater understanding and acceptance of human rights, good governance and multiculturalism in Fiji. CR states that it helped build relationships between different ethnic and political groups in Fiji at local and national level.

== Funding ==
Conciliation Resources receives funding support from a wide range of donors and publishes its latest audited accounts, in accordance with UK Charity Commission Regulations, on its website.

== Board of trustees ==
Conciliation Resources’ board of trustees is composed of the following members: Diana Good, Jamille Jinnah, Liz Muir, Dorothee Hutter, Lucy Moore, Christine Cheng, Nesta Hatendi, Jo Kemp, George Graham, Tayyiba Bajwa, Andrew Peck.
