= Félix Houphouët-Boigny Peace Prize =

- Description: Prize honoring significant contributions to promoting, seeking, safeguarding, or maintaining peace
- Country: International
- Presented by: UNESCO
- Website: https://www.unesco.org/en/prizes/felix-houphouet-boigny-unesco-peace-prize

The Yamoussoukro-based Félix Houphouët-Boigny Foundation for peace

The Félix Houphouët-Boigny Peace Prize was established in 1989 by UNESCO, at its 25th General Conference in Paris. Its aim is:

"to honour living individuals and active public or private bodies or institutions that have made a significant contribution to promoting, seeking, safeguarding or maintaining peace in conformity with the Charter of the United Nations and the Constitution of UNESCO."

The prize bears the name of Félix Houphouët-Boigny, the late former president of Côte d'Ivoire, who served from independence in 1960 until his death in 1993. It is awarded annually. The prize includes a cheque of US$150,000, a gold medal and a peace diploma. If there are multiple recipients, the cheque is shared equally.

== Recipients ==
Year	Recipient	Country	Rationale
1991	Nelson Mandela	South Africa	"For their contribution to international peace, to encourage them to continue in their effort and as a tribute to what they have done to educate their people towards understanding and overcoming of prejudice that many would not have thought possible a few years ago"
1991	Frederik Willem de Klerk	South Africa	"For their contribution to international peace, to encourage them to continue in their effort and as a tribute to what they have done to educate their people towards understanding and overcoming of prejudice that many would not have thought possible a few years ago"
1992	Hague Academy of International Law	Netherlands	"We believe the world is in a new phase of international relations. Quite different from the one through which we have just gone (...) and we are convinced that international law must be given a larger role in the settlement of international disputes and in the solution of international problems."
1993	Yitzhak Rabin	Israel	"We have concluded that this year, naturally, the most dramatic and important event has been the agreement between the Palestinians and Israel, and our Committee has therefore awarded the 1993 Félix Houphouët-Boigny Peace Prize to Prime Minister Yitzhak Rabin and to Foreign Minister Shimon Peres on the Israeli side, and to Chairman Yasser Arafat for the Palestine Liberation Organization."
1993	Shimon Peres	Israel	"We have concluded that this year, naturally, the most dramatic and important event has been the agreement between the Palestinians and Israel, and our Committee has therefore awarded the 1993 Félix Houphouët-Boigny Peace Prize to Prime Minister Yitzhak Rabin and to Foreign Minister Shimon Peres on the Israeli side, and to Chairman Yasser Arafat for the Palestine Liberation Organization."
1993	Yasser Arafat	Palestinian territories	"We have concluded that this year, naturally, the most dramatic and important event has been the agreement between the Palestinians and Israel, and our Committee has therefore awarded the 1993 Félix Houphouët-Boigny Peace Prize to Prime Minister Yitzhak Rabin and to Foreign Minister Shimon Peres on the Israeli side, and to Chairman Yasser Arafat for the Palestine Liberation Organization."
1994	Juan Carlos I of Spain	Spain	"(...) [The King of Spain], for his role in guaranteeing the transition to democracy, for his continuing contribution to the protection of minorities in the transition to democracy, and for the international role of conciliation that Spain has played. [Carter for] his capacity as Chairman of the Carter Center and his contribution to the pursuit of peace in many different parts of the world and (...) succeeding in making such a contribution even before the government of his country had requested him to do so."
1994	Jimmy Carter	United States	
1995	Office of the United Nations High Commissioner for Refugees	Switzerland	"We have agreed unanimously to give a dual prize to the Office of the United Nations High Commissioner for Refugees for the work that it is doing and secondly to the United Nations High Commissioner for Refugees, Ms. Ogata, for the distinctive quality she has added to the mission that has been assigned to her, for the excellence of her efforts and for the way she has raised international concern for the refugees."
1995	Sadako Ogata	Japan	"We have agreed unanimously to give a dual prize to the Office of the United Nations High Commissioner for Refugees for the work that it is doing and secondly to the United Nations High Commissioner for Refugees, Ms. Ogata, for the distinctive quality she has added to the mission that has been assigned to her, for the excellence of her efforts and for the way she has raised international concern for the refugees."
1996	Álvaro Enrique Arzú Irigoyen	Guatemala	
1996	Rolando Morán	Guatemala	
1997	Fidel V. Ramos	Philippines	"For the agreement they have made in ending the conflict on 2nd September 1996 between the Philippines Government and the Moro National Liberation Front."
1997	Nur Misuari	Philippines	"For the agreement they have made in ending the conflict on 2nd September 1996 between the Philippines Government and the Moro National Liberation Front."
1998	Sheikh Hasina	Bangladesh	"In awarding the 1998 Prize to Sheikh Hasina, Prime Minister of the People's Republic of Bangladesh who, on 2 December 1997, signed a peace agreement which put an end to 25 years of civil war, and to Senator George J. Mitchell whose work enabled the main players in the Irish crisis to sign the Good Friday Agreement, the Jury has wanted to focus attention on the efforts deployed in the search for peace through dialogue and negotiation."
1998	George J. Mitchell	United States	"In awarding the 1998 Prize to Sheikh Hasina, Prime Minister of the People's Republic of Bangladesh who, on 2 December 1997, signed a peace agreement which put an end to 25 years of civil war, and to Senator George J. Mitchell whose work enabled the main players in the Irish crisis to sign the Good Friday Agreement, the Jury has wanted to focus attention on the efforts deployed in the search for peace through dialogue and negotiation."
1999	Community of Sant'Egidio	Italy	"In recognition of their efforts in achieving ecumenical understanding between all religions, their efforts of conciliation in Algeria, Mozambique, Guinea-Bissau and Yugoslavia, for their contribution to human understanding and for eliminating the religious, political and ethnic sources of conflict."
2000	Mary Robinson	Ireland	"For the great contribution that she has made for the defence and promotion of Human Rights. The decision, of course, was unanimous."
2001	Not awarded		
2002	Kay Rala Xanana Gusmão	East Timor	"For his contribution to the fight for human dignity and for his conduct which has elevated the human spirit not only in his region, but in the world."
2003	Roger Etchegaray	France	"In recognition of their action in favour of inter-faith dialogue, tolerance and peace."
2003	Mustafa Cerić	Bosnia and Herzegovina	"In recognition of their action in favour of inter-faith dialogue, tolerance and peace."
2004	Not awarded		
2005	Abdoulaye Wade	Senegal	"For his contributions to democracy in Senegal, and for his role in mediating political disputes in the region."
2006	Not awarded		
2007	Martti Ahtisaari	Finland	"For leading the process that resulted in independence of Namibia and for [his] very great contribution to the resolution of the fatricidal conflict between the Indonesian Government and the Free Aceh Movement."
2008	Luiz Inácio Lula da Silva	Brazil	"For his actions in pursuit of peace, dialogue, democracy, social justice and equal rights, as well as for his valuable contribution to the eradication of poverty and the protection of minorities' rights."
2009	Not awarded		
2010	Not awarded		
2011	Grandmothers of the Plaza de Mayo	Argentina	
2013	François Hollande	France	
2017	SOS Méditerranée	ٍEurope	
2017	Giuseppina Maria Nicolini	Italy	For saving lives of refugees and immigrants.
2019	Abiy Ahmed	Ethiopia	For his peacemaking efforts in his country and the Horn of African region.
2022	Angela Merkel	Germany	For her efforts to welcome refugees during the 2015 European migrant crisis.
2024	António Costa	Portugal	In recognition of his commitment to multilateralism, dialogue, and sustainable development.
