= Moro Islamic Liberation Front =

Group in Mindanao, Philippines, seeking Moro autonomy

Moro Islamic Liberation Front (MILF)
- جبهة تحرير مورو الإسلامية
- Seal
- Other name: Bangsamoro Islamic Armed Forces (BIAF)
- Leaders: Al-Hadj Murad Ibrahim, Sheikh Hashim Salamat (former)
- Dates active: 1977 – 27 March 2014 (permanent ceasefire)
- Split from: Moro National Liberation Front
- Country: Philippines
- Headquarters: Darapanan, Sultan Kudarat, Maguindanao del Norte
- Newspaper: Luwaran
- Active regions: Mindanao, Philippines
- Ideology: Moro autonomy Islamism; Moro Islamic nationalism
- Status: Inactive (as an armed group) Active (as a political organization)
- Size: 14,000 armed fighters 40,000 combatants, 26,000 of whom decommissioned (MILF claim)
- Website: www.luwaran.com

The Moro Islamic Liberation Front (MILF; Arabic: جبهة تحرير مورو الإسلامية, romanized: Jabhat Taḥrīr Moro al-ʾIslāmiyya) is an Islamist militant group based in Mindanao, Philippines, which split from the Moro National Liberation Front (MNLF) in 1977. It seeks to achieve autonomy for the Moro people from the central government. The group has a presence in the Bangsamoro region of Mindanao, the Sulu Archipelago, Palawan, Basilan, and other neighbouring islands. The armed wing of the group was the Bangsamoro Islamic Armed Forces (BIAF), although the name of its parent organization, the MILF, was often used to refer to the BIAF.

In July 2018, the Philippine government passed the Bangsamoro Organic Law, giving more autonomy to Muslims. In return, MILF announced that it would disarm its 30,000 fighters.

== History ==
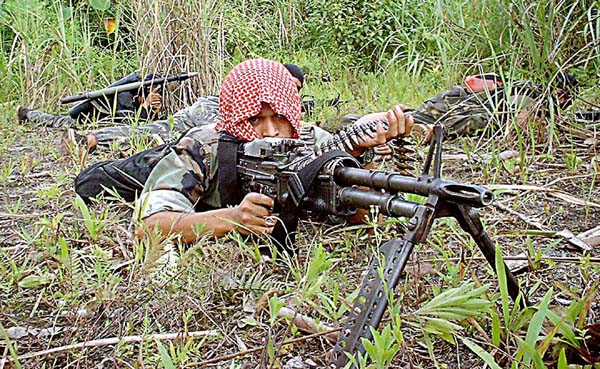
A Bangsamoro fighter trains with an M60 machine gun.

Following the Jabidah massacre in 1968, the Moro National Liberation Front (MNLF) was established clandestinely in 1969 by Moro students studying at the University of the Philippines, Egypt, and in the Middle East who sought to create an independent Muslim nation in southern Philippines. The MNLF gained foreign support from Muammar Gaddafi of Libya, which supplied arms and provided training for Moro youths. The MNLF took part in violent acts and assassinations to achieve their goals. The government in Manila sent troops into the southern Philippines to control the insurgency.

In 1976, Libyan leader Muammar Gaddafi brokered a negotiation between the Philippine government and MNLF Leader Nur Misuari which led to the signing of the MNLF-GRPH Tripoli Agreement of 1976 wherein the MNLF accepted the Philippine government's offer of semi-autonomy of the regions in dispute.

The signing of this agreement brought about a serious rift in MNLF leadership, leading to the formation of a breakaway group in 1977 by Hashim Salamat and 57 MNLF officers. The group was initially known as "The New Leadership". Misuari expelled Salamat in December 1977, after which Salamat moved his new organization first to Cairo, Egypt, and then, in 1980, to Lahore, Pakistan, where it engaged in diplomatic activities. This organization was formally established in 1984 as the Moro Islamic Liberation Front (MILF). Muammar Gaddafi became a longstanding supporter of the MILF after its emergence.

In January 1987, the MNLF accepted the Philippine government's offer of semi-autonomy of the regions in dispute, subsequently leading to the establishment of the Autonomous Region in Muslim Mindanao on November 6, 1990. The MILF, however, refused to accept this offer and continued their insurgency operations. A general cessation of hostilities between the government in Manila and the MILF was signed in July 1997, but this agreement was abolished in 2000 by the Philippine Army under the administration of President Joseph Estrada. In response, the MILF declared a jihad against the government, its citizens and supporters. Under President Gloria Arroyo, the government entered into a cease-fire agreement with the MILF and resumed peace talks.

Despite peace negotiations and the cease-fire agreement, the MILF clashes with government troops in Maguindanao, resulting in at least twenty-three casualties in January 2005. The combined armies of the MILF and Abu Sayyaf were involved in days of fighting, which necessitated government troops using heavy artillery to engage rebel forces.

The bombing incident in Davao Airport in 2003, which the Philippine government blamed on MILF members, raised speculation that the peace negotiations would be ineffectual in bringing peace to Mindanao if the MILF was unable to control its operatives. The MILF has denied ties with the Islamic fundemantalist group Jemaah Islamiyah, although Jemaah Islamiyah is considered to have provided them with training facilities in areas they control. The MILF has also continued to deny connections with Al-Qaeda, though it has admitted to sending around 600 volunteers to Al-Qaeda training camps in Afghanistan and that Osama bin Laden sent money to the Philippines, though the group denies directly receiving any payment.

From June 28 to July 6, 2006, conflict occurred between the MILF and armed civilian volunteers under Maguindanao provincial governor Andal Ampatuan Sr. who were supported by the Philippine Army. The fighting began after Ampatuan blamed the MILF for a June 23 bombing incident on his motorcade, which killed five in his entourage. The MILF denied responsibility, but Ampatuan sent police and civilian volunteers to arrest MILF members involved to the incident. Four thousand families were reported displaced by the fighting that followed, which was ended by a cease-fire agreement signed on July 10 and 11.

Talks between the MILF and the government collapsed in 2008 after a Supreme Court decision in Sema vs. COMELEC rejected a preliminary accord that would have expanded the Autonomous Region in Muslim Mindanao. In 2011, the MILF withdrew their demands for independence, instead saying that they would pursue substate status, likened to a U.S. state instead of independence from the Philippines.

=== Involvement and relationships between the MILF and foreign Pan-Islamist and Separatist movements (1977-2014) ===
A journal written by the Arizona State University noted that out of the 600 members of the MILF during its early years, 180 participated in the Soviet-Afghan War alongside the Mujahedeen, the Cadres returned to the Southern Philippines after the war and established military camps, spreading values taught in Afghanistan during their military service to the Moro Muslim youth

Hashim Salamat, the first chairman and founder of the MILF, also moved his partisans in Pakistan to solidify and establish key links with other pan-Islamic militant organizations worldwide

In 1987, the Philippine police had discovered a large cell of the Abu Nidal group, and the Palestine Liberation Organization (PLO) also began funneling weapons to both major Bangsamoro movements, the MNLF and MILF. The following year, Osama bin Laden dispatched his brother-in-law to the region to develop a support network for the operations of Al-Qaeda

The money and support of Al-Qaeda directly facilitated the creation of the Abu Sayyaf Group in 1991 by a former Moro Muslim mujahideen veteran of the Soviet-Afghan War by the name of "Abdurajak Janjalani"

The MILF publicly committed to supporting the Southern Philippines Zone of Peace and Development (SZOPAD) agreement, but also began to resort to terror to advance its political agenda and had also increased its direct association with al-Qaeda, receiving increased funding and technical assistance in the form of imported trainers from elsewhere in the Muslim world, and sent members to train in camps located in Taliban controlled Afghanistan and Pakistan

increased cooperation between MILF and regional terrorist organizations including Malaysia’s Kampulan Mujahideen and Indonesia’s Jemaah Islamiya, due to their close proximity and kinship, the alliance of all three movements helped the strengthening of each others, an example being Jemaah Islamiyah fundraising the MILF in exchange for training

MILF's connection with international, and especially regional terrorist groups on the other hand was increasing. In addition to continued Al-Qaeda support, during the mid-1990s, Hamas and the Tamil Tigers (LTTE) both sought sanctuary in the ARMM region and Southern Philippines Zone of Peace and Development (SZOPAD) zones, Jemaah Islamiya also greatly facilitated the MILF.

The University of Maryland's START database also identifies GAM as an MILF ally and cites the training of GAM (Free Aceh Movement) militants in MILF camps in 2003.

Between 2001 and 2002 Singaporean investigations uncovered connections between JI operatives and an MILF trainer and bomb specialist.

In October 2002 JI carried out the 2002 Bali bombings, killing 151 westerners. Umar Patek, who was one of the major players in the bombings, was trained by the Moro Islamic Liberation Front in the late 1990s.

== Struggles ==
=== Memorandum of Agreement on Ancestral Domain ===
On August 4, 2008, the Supreme Court of the Philippines issued a temporary restraining order, preventing the government and the MILF from officially signing the Memorandum of Agreement on Ancestral Domain (MOA-AD), which would conclude all dispute and begin formal talks that would lead to the drafting and eventual signing of a Final Comprehensive Compact between the two groups. The court accepted motions by the southern provincial governments that objected to the extended boundaries for the Autonomous Region in Muslim Mindanao envisioned in the peace deal. The MOA-AD would have allowed the Moro people to gain control of the region under the concept of human rights with the right to establish a police force and to control natural resources.

The MOA-AD was initialed by former governor and peace panel chair Rodolfo Garcia and Presidential Adviser on the Peace Process Hermogenes Esperon and MILF peace panel chair Mohagher Iqbal on July 27, 2008, in Malaysia. It was scheduled for formal signing on August 5, but the Supreme Court issued no negotiation preventing the executive department from signing the agreement. The MOA-AD was the last of several agenda items under the 2001 agreement of the GRP-MILF, after security and relief and rehabilitation, prior to the discussion on the political settlement.

The Young Moro Professionals Network (YMPN) appealed to the public in 2009 to not be afraid of the MOA-AD.

In these times of hardship, we hold hands as one, with our Christian and Islamic neighbours, in the name of peace, acceptance and justice. We are committed to democratic and peaceful resolution of the conflict. Do not be afraid of the MOA-AD. To the national public, open your hearts to the Moro grievance.

Over the next month, several MILF commanders were tagged by government officials as having initiated an offensive campaign. The Armed Forces of the Philippines responded to the allegation by immediately deploying ten battalions composed of a total of 6,000 soldiers into Mindanao under the command of Lt. Gen. Cardozo Luna. The violence displaced over 600,000 people and left about 300 dead.

On October 14, 2008, the court conducted a series of divided votes declared "contrary to law and the Constitution" the MOA-AD of the Government of the Republic of the Philippines and Moro Islamic Liberation Front Tripoli Agreement of Peace on 2001. Conchita Carpio-Morales ruled: "In sum, the Presidential Adviser on the Peace Process committed grave abuse of discretion when he failed to carry out the pertinent consultation process. The furtive process by which the MOA-AD was designed and crafted runs contrary to and in excess of the legal authority and amounts to a whimsical, capricious, oppressive, arbitrary and despotic exercise thereof. It illustrates a gross evasion of positive duty and a virtual refusal to perform the duty enjoined."

Civil society organizations such as Consortium of Bangsamoro Civil Society submitted a motion for reconsideration. However, on November 21, 2008, the Supreme Court affirmed its October 14 ruling that declared unconstitutional the MOA-AD between the Philippine government and the MILF.

MILF soldiers offered to help free the Irish priest father Michael Sinott, who was kidnapped in the Philippines on October 14, 2009, and sought permission to deploy about 100 of its soldiers in the area where Sinnott is believed to be held. However, this was turned down by the Philippine government.

=== Modification of demands ===
On September 23, 2010, Mohagher Iqbal said that the MILF would pursue a substate, likened to a U.S. state, instead of independence from the Philippines. The Muslim substate would not exercise power over national defense, foreign affairs, currency and coinage, and postal services, which the central government would continue to exercise. Iqbal further added that the substate would not have its own armed forces but instead would have troops for internal security.

=== Peace talks ===
"Moro women were initially disenfranchised in the peace talks, even if they are equal stakeholders in the war making and peacebuilding in Mindanao, and that "the war years took their toll mostly on women and children" (Arguillas 2014)." Jopson said. There were no Moro women publicly involved in the peace talks. The all-men panels reflected the military framework of the earlier talks.

Emily Marohombsar was the first Moro woman negotiator for the GPH from 1998 to 2004. The rounds of peace talks from 2010 was more diverse in terms of participation and leadership. Women's involvement in peace talks justified the limited scope and narrow focus of gender content in the peace documents, since securing the BARMM was the main goal and the Moro identity was important.

On October 7, 2012, President Benigno Aquino announced a peace deal with the MILF and that "This framework agreement paves the way for a final and enduring peace in Mindanao". MILF vice-chair Ghazali Jaafar said, "We are very happy. We thank the president for this." The deal was signed on October 15, 2012. Its aim is to pave the way to enduring peace between the two parties by officially envisaging an autonomous region in Mindanao.

According to the framework, this semi-independent Muslim area would have a more just share of revenues from the extraction of its own plentiful resources, budgetary autonomy, its own police, and sharia law only for Muslims. In exchange for this, the MILF would be willing to stop armed movements against the government for autonomy and allow the national government to retain its control of national security and foreign policy. The autonomy agreement to be gradually implemented would also rename the region Bangsamoro, after the Moro people.

Chief peace negotiator Miriam Coronel-Ferrer said that the government was cautiously optimistic for a final agreement soon following six days of talks on July 13, 2013. She said: "This signing indicates that both sides are really committed to finish the peace negotiations. Nobody wants this not to reach its fruition." The agreement would see government allowances for the MILF to have a 75 percent share of earnings from natural resources and metallic minerals in a proposed autonomous region. For other energy resources, earnings would be split equally in accordance with Malaysia-brokered talks.

=== Peace agreement ===
On January 24, 2014, Philippine government chief negotiator Miriam Coronel Ferrer and MILF chief negotiator Mohagher Iqbal signed a peace agreement in Kuala Lumpur. The agreement would pave the way for the creation of the new Muslim autonomous entity called Bangsamoro under a law to be approved by the Philippine Congress. The government aimed to set up the region by 2016. The agreement called for Muslim self-rule in parts of the southern Philippines in exchange for a deactivation of rebel forces by the MILF. MILF forces would turn over their firearms to a third party selected by the MILF and the Philippine government. A regional police force would be established, and the Philippine military would reduce the presence of troops and help disband private armies in the area. President Rodrigo Duterte signed the law, a key step to ending a Muslim rebellion in the south of the mainly Catholic Philippines. In early January 2020, the Office of the Presidential Adviser on the Peace Process announced progress exceeding its target for the decommissioning of MILF fighters, noting that "8,879 out of the 12,000 MILF combatants were decommissioned from the last quarter of 2019". Some former rebel fighters have joined the police and military to protect certain areas of the Bangsamoro region until an elected government is established in 2022.

As of 2023, the MILF is steering the BARMM and started decommissioning in 2019, and the peace negotiators are preparing for an exit agreement.

== See also ==
- List of Islamic political parties
- Bangsamoro Basic Law
- United Bangsamoro Justice Party
- Insurgency in the Philippines
- Moro National Liberation Front
- Moro people
- New People's Army
- Bangsamoro peace process
