= Juan S. Alano Memorial Hospital =

Hospital in Basilan, Philippines

- Alano Group of Companies
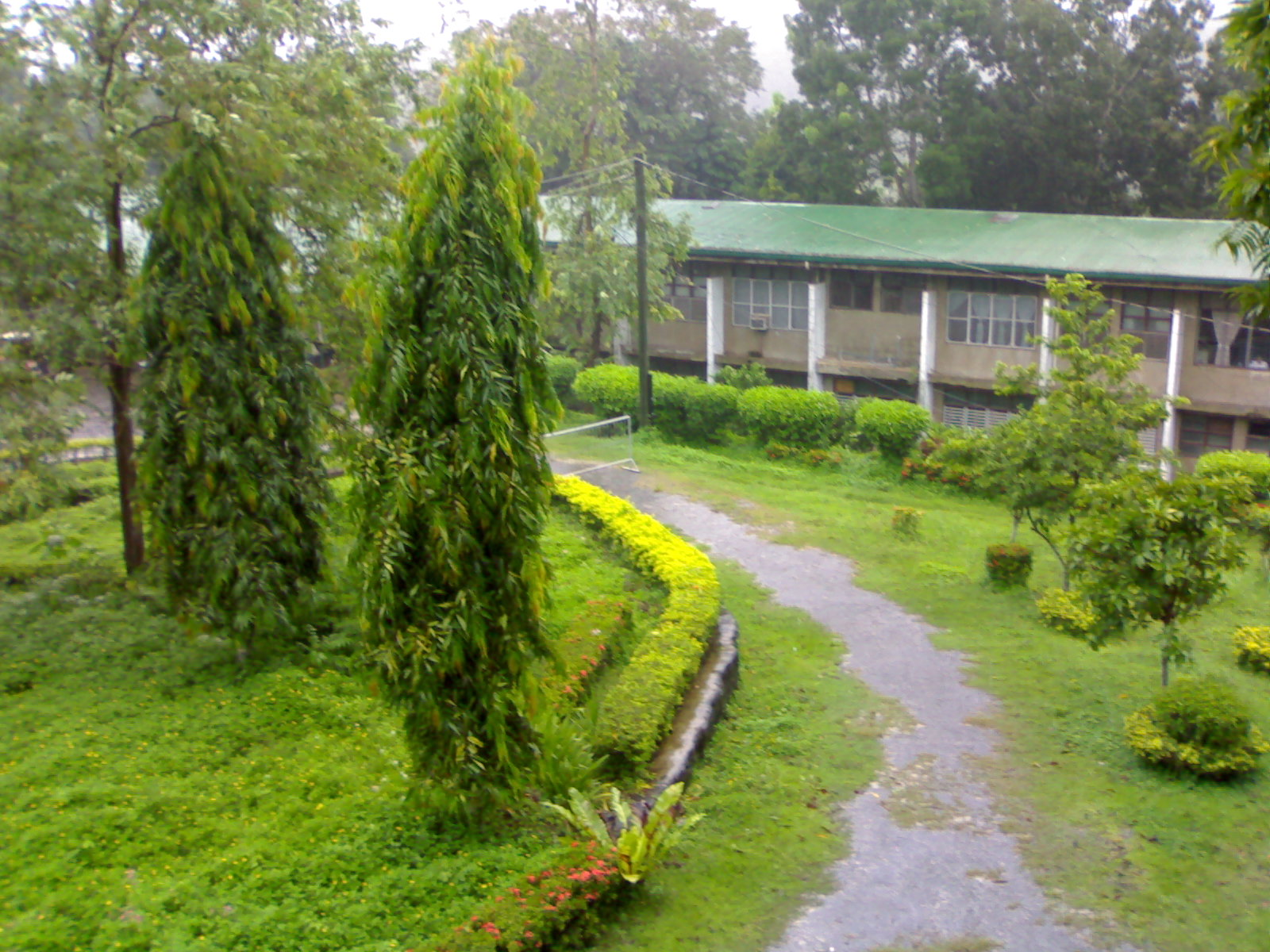

Geography
- Location: Isabela, Basilan, Zamboanga Peninsula, Philippines
- Coordinates: 6°42′01″N 121°58′14″E

Organization
- Care system: Private, Philippine Health Insurance Corporation (PhilHealth) accredited
- Type: Secondary

Services
- Standards: Philippine Department of Health
- Beds: 50

History
- Founded: February 8, 1953

Links
- Lists: Hospitals in the Philippines

Juan S. Alano Memorial Hospital, Inc., a non-stock, non-profit organization, duly registered with the Securities and Exchange Commission, is an accredited healthcare institution by the Department of Health and the Philippine Health Insurance Corporation. This institution caters to the healthcare service needs of the locality spanning four municipalities of the province namely: Maluso, Lantawan, Sumisip and Tipo-Tipo, as well as the cities of Lamitan and Isabela where it is located.

== History ==
The Juan S. Alano Memorial Hospital, Inc. was established in 1953 by its founder, first Assemblyman of Zamboanga Province to the National Assembly of the Philippine Commonwealth (1936–1941), and Congressman of the same at the 1st Philippine Congress (1946–1949), Don Juan S. Alano. With donated land given by the Basilan Estate, Inc. another company owned by Cong. Alano, and with the assistance of Dr. Jaime O. Rivera, his son-in-law and proprietor of the Rivera Hospital at Proj. 4, Quezon City, construction and training of the hospital and its medical staff started early in 1952.

The institution was then named and established as the Basilan Hospital, aimed at providing affordable healthcare service to the community as a non-stock, non-profit and charitable institution.

In 1959, the Basilan Hospital School of Midwifery was finally established, aimed at providing the educational needs of cultural minority groups as well as to train personnel to render specialized services in the field of midwifery.

After the death of the founder in 1966, Basilan Hospital was named after its founder and since then was known as Juan S. Alano Memorial Hospital, Inc. Currently the institution is duly accredited by the Department of Health as a Level 2 Category Hospital with an authorized bed capacity of fifty (50). It is also accredited with the Philippine Health Insurance Corporation as a Secondary category hospital with an authorized bed capacity of thirty (30). It is a member of the Philippine Hospitals Association (PHA) and the Private Hospitals Association of the Philippines (PHAP).

The hospital's total employee population is fifty-eight (56), composed of nine (9) Administrative Dept. Staff; eight (9) Nursing Dept. Staff; seven (5) Pharmacy, Radiology, and Medical Records Dept. Staff; fifteen (15) Midwives; eleven (11) Maintenance Dept. Staff; three (3) Dietary Dept. Staff; and five (4) Medical Dept. Staff.

The Juan S. Alano Memorial Hospital, Inc. is currently active in various medical missions for the underprivileged and underserved communities of the province together with the Juan S. Alano Memorial School, Inc. (formerly Basilan Hospital School of Midwifery) through the National Service Training Program (NSTP). The institution is also conducting various medical programs one of which is the free consultation and affordable eye surgery, which is conducted twice a year.

The Juan S. Alano Memorial Hospital, Inc. has forged ties with Family Planning of the Philippines (FPOP) throughout the 70s and 80s, promoting population management advocacies to the local community. It is currently working out a program on Adolescent Reproductive Health (ARH) initiatives with the Consuelo Foundation, to further institutionalize private-sector led programs aimed at disseminating vital information on Adolescent Reproductive health issues, condom use and HIV/AIDS prevention.

Although a declared non-sectarian organization, the Juan S. Alano Memorial Hospital, Inc., with an Episcopalian Chaplain, has established ties with Brent Hospital and Colleges of Allied Medicine located in Zamboanga City.
