= Isabela, Basilan =

Component city in Basilan, Philippines

Isabela Ciudad De Isabela De Basilan Lungsod ng Isabela
- Component city
- City of Isabela
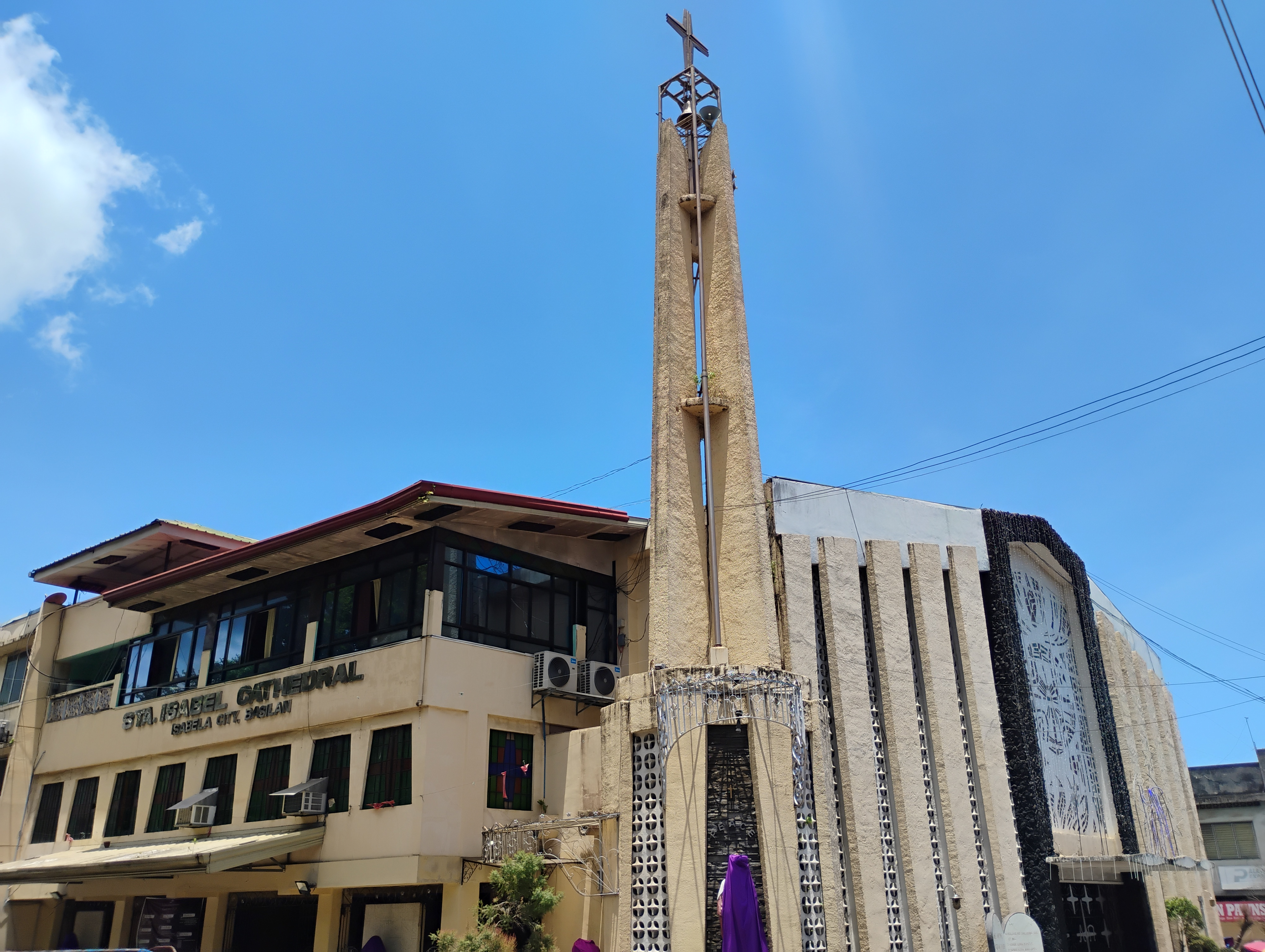
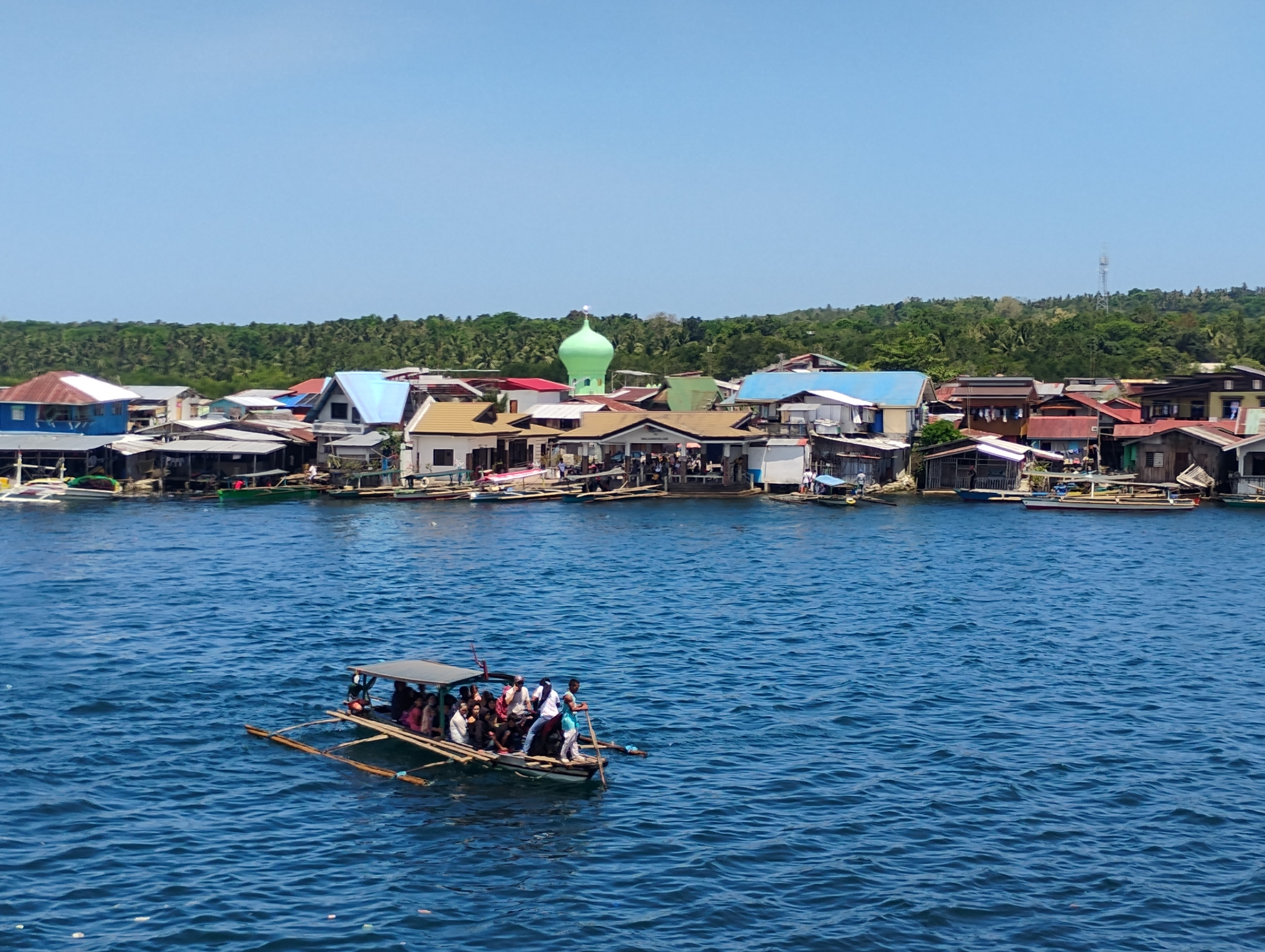
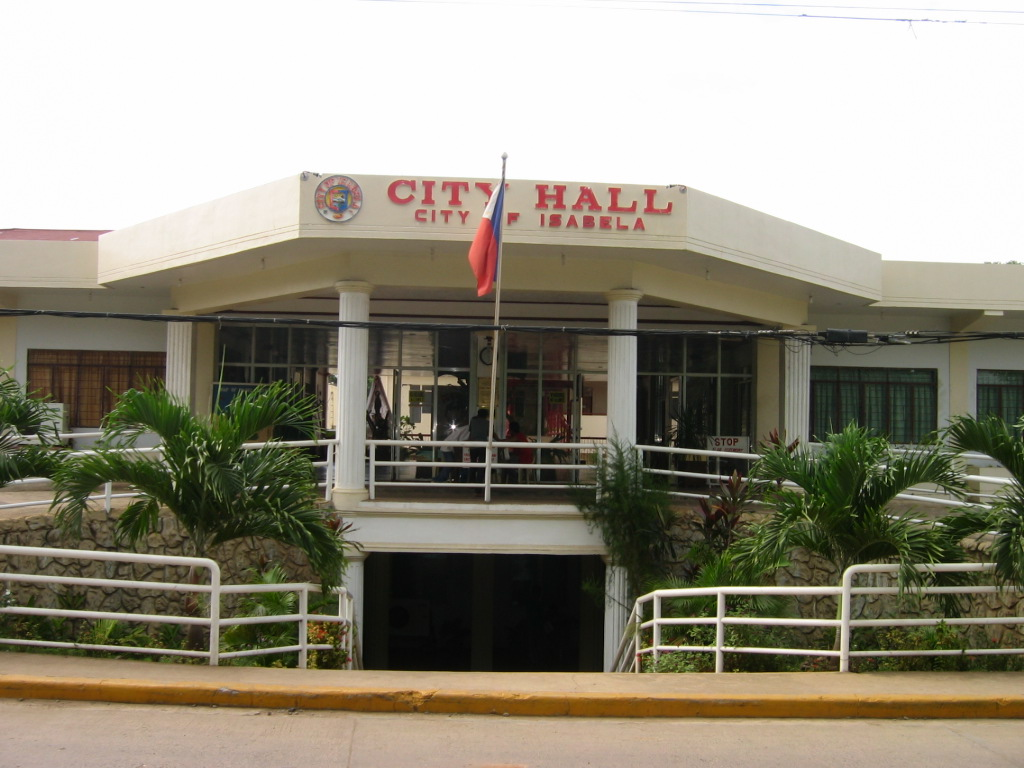
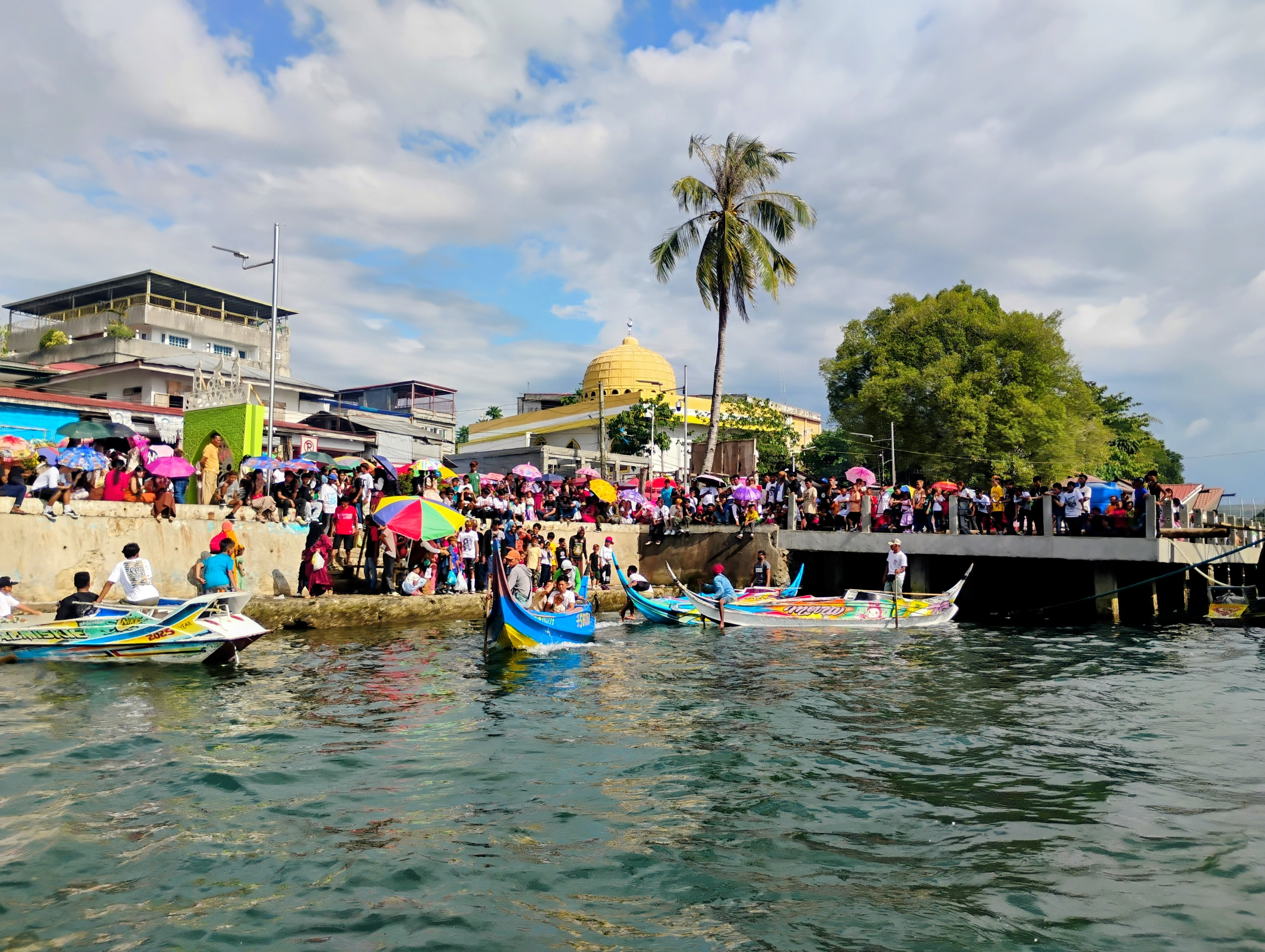
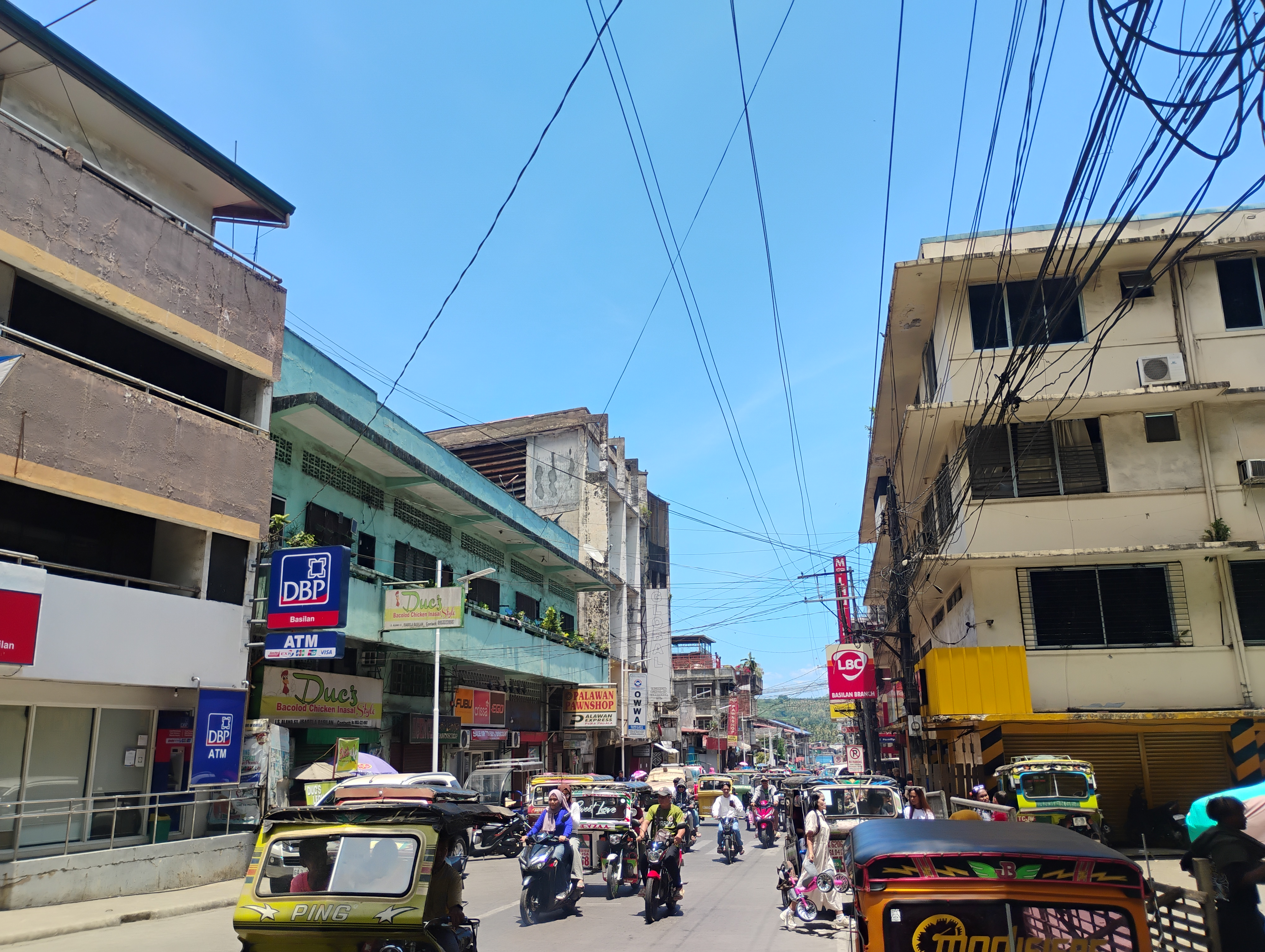
- Old Basilan Provincial Capitol Santa Isabel Cathedral Malamawi Island Isabela City Hall Basilan Port Terminal Isabela City Poblacion

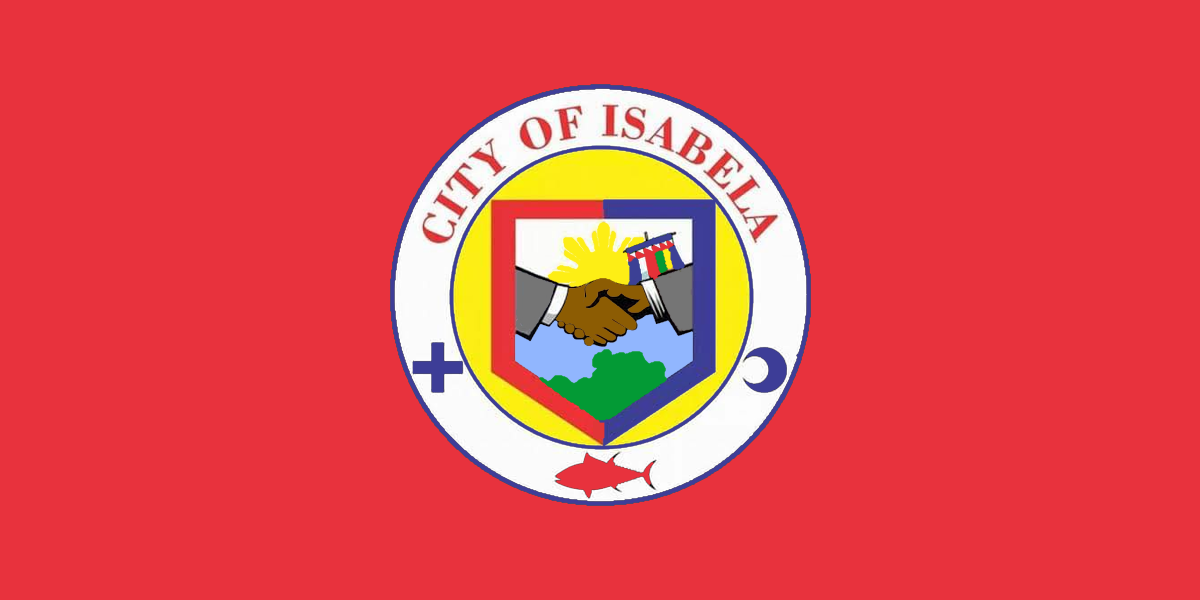
- Flag Seal
- Nickname: HAPIsabela
- Anthem: Isabela City Hymn
- Interactive map of Isabela
- Location within the Philippines
- Coordinates: 6°42′N 121°58′E
- Country: Philippines
- Region: Zamboanga Peninsula (Region IX)
- Province: Basilan
- District: Lone district
- Founded: 1848
- Cityhood: April 25, 2001
- Named for: Isabella II of Spain
- Barangays: 45 (see Barangays)

Government
  - Type: Sangguniang Panlungsod
  - Mayor: Hon. Sitti Djalia Turabin-Hataman
  - Vice Mayor: Hon. Ar-Jhemar K. Ajibon
  - Representative: Ust. Yusop S. Alano
  - City Council: Members: Hon. Jeromy L. Casas; Hon. Alexes I. Ututalum; Hon. Yusop I. Abubakar; Hon. Al-Ameen Camlian; Hon. Abner S. Rodriguez; Hon. Jashim Tiplani; Hon. Sara Ismael; Hon. Khaleedsher M. Asarul; Hon. Haizer Salain; Hon. Karel Anjaiza R. Sakkalahul; SK Federation Hon. Naila Belleng; ABC President Abral G. Abdurahman

Area
  - Total: 223.73 km^{2} (86.38 sq mi)
- Elevation: 96 m (315 ft)
- Highest elevation: 999 m (3,278 ft)
- Lowest elevation: 0 m (0 ft)

Population (2024 census)
  - Total: 151,297
  - Density: 676.25/km^{2} (1,751.5/sq mi)
  - Households: 26,649

Economy
  - Income class: 3rd city income class
  - Poverty incidence: 16% (2023)
  - Revenue: ₱ 971.4 million (2024)
  - Assets: ₱ 2,330 million (2024)
  - Expenditure: ₱ 897.6 million (2024)
  - Liabilities: ₱ 304.6 million (2024)

Service provider
  - Electricity: Basilan Electric Cooperative (BASELCO)
- Time zone: UTC+8 (PST)
- ZIP code: 7300
- PSGC: 099701000
- IDD : area code: +63 (0)62
- Native languages: Chavacano; Yakan; Tagalog
- Website: www.isabelacity.gov.ph

Isabela, officially the City of Isabela, (Note: Chavacano: Ciudad de Isabela; Tausug: Dāira sin Isabela; Yakan: Siudad Isabelahin; Filipino: Lungsod ng Isabela)) is a component city in the province of Basilan in the Philippines. According to the 2024 census, it has a population of 151,297 people making it the most populous city in the province. It is also colloquially known as Isabela de Basilan to differentiate the city's name from the province of Isabela in Luzon.

Although Isabela is a component city of Basilan, it is administratively part of the Zamboanga Peninsula region (Region IX), whereas the rest of the province belongs to the Bangsamoro Autonomous Region in Muslim Mindanao (BARMM). Because of this regional division, the Philippine Statistics Authority reports Isabela's census data separately from the province, and the Basilan provincial government treats the city as administratively distinct from the province's jurisdiction. This regional separation prompted BARMM's predecessor, the Autonomous Region in Muslim Mindanao, to transfer the capital to Lamitan.

Institutionally, the military has played a major part in Isabela's and Basilan's volatile history, due to the ongoing conflicts borne out of the Moro secessionist wars of the 1970s, and more recently, by Al-Qaeda backed Islamic fundamentalist groups fomenting a running gun-battle with the Armed Forces of the Philippines for more than a decade.

The Roman Catholic Church and the Islamic mufti and imams, religious scholars and leaders exert influence over everyday life of members of their respective groups.

Trading and commerce are still predominantly in the hands of the East Asian (Hokkien Chinese), aided more so by a recent influx of immigrants from Taiwan and by Koreans as well.

== History ==
Isabela's history is inadvertently intermingled with that of Basilan Island and the Sulu Archipelago, albeit culturally, Isabela is an extension of neighboring Zamboanga City.

=== Precolonial History of Basilan ===
According to royal genealogical records, colonial accounts, and modern historical research, Basilan, historically known as Taguima, developed as an important regional trade center in the precolonial period, linking the Sulu Archipelago, Borneo, and wider Southeast Asian maritime networks.

The authority of Datu Taguima reflects the island’s early political and commercial significance in regional affairs.

The island’s inhabitants, known as the Tagimaha, formed a coastal and inland farming community engaged in trade, seafaring, agriculture, and regional diplomacy. Their activities contributed to Taguima’s role as a center of economic activity, cultural exchange, and early political organization within the Sulu Archipelago.

==== Champa Trade and Cultural Exchange ====
By the 7th to 8th centuries, Champa (Orang Dampuan) traders from mainland Southeast Asia maintained sustained commercial and social contact with Taguima (Basilan) through regional maritime trade networks. These Cham merchants established trading ties, settlements, and intermarried with local Tagimaha communities, contributing maritime knowledge, boat-building techniques, textile production methods, decorative weaving styles, and social organizational practices. This long-term interaction shaped Tagimaha society into a culturally hybrid community that combined indigenous Basilan traditions with Cham-derived maritime, artistic, and commercial influences, strengthening Basilan’s role as a center of regional trade and cultural exchange in the Sulu Archipelago.

Between the 9th and 12th centuries, a violent conflict erupted in Sulu between the Buranun and Champa (Orang Dampuan) merchants over trade dominance and economic power. According to historical accounts and Sulu oral traditions, many Orang Dampuan traders were killed in a massacre linked to rising tensions over wealth, commerce, and political influence. Survivors of the violence fled the Sulu mainland, with a significant group seeking refuge in Taguima (Basilan), where they settled among local Tagimaha communities. This migration created a second wave of Cham-linked settlement in Basilan, reinforcing existing trade networks, cultural exchange, and demographic ties between Champa-origin groups and indigenous Tagimaha society.

By the 10th to 13th centuries, Islamic influence in the Sulu Archipelago and Basilan expanded through Muslim merchants and missionaries, including scholars associated with Champa (Orang Dampuan). These missionaries reinforced earlier Islamic knowledge introduced through trade, teaching religious practices, legal traditions, and communal norms to coastal and inland communities in Taguima (Basilan). Some Tagimaha groups were among the earliest adopters of Islam in the southern Philippines, predating the formal establishment of the Sulu Sultanate.

==== Basilan Before the Sultanate ====
In pursuit of expanded trade routes, territory, and political influence, Tagimaha groups expanded beyond Taguima (Basilan) into Buansa (Jolo), where they encountered resistance from the indigenous Buranun, regarded in local tradition as the original inhabitants of Sulu. As a result, some Tagimaha groups returned to Taguima (Basilan), while others remained in Buansa. Royal genealogical records in the Sulu tarsila describe the Tagimaha who stayed in Buansa as early leaders who helped establish local systems of governance that later shaped Sulu political development.

In Buansa (Jolo), Tagimaha leaders are recorded in Sulu genealogical traditions as having supported three important Muslim figures. Karimul Makdum introduced Islam and began early religious teaching in the region, and is traditionally credited with the construction of one of the earliest mosques in Sulu. Tuan Masha’ikha strengthened Islamic influence among local elites. Raja Baguinda later arrived, initially encountering resistance, but eventually became a political leader in Buansa and married into a local ruling family linked in some traditions to Tagimaha lineage. These interactions contributed to the spread of Islam and early political development in Sulu before the establishment of the Sulu Sultanate.

The historical influence of the Tagimaha extended beyond Basilan and Buansa into the long-term political development of the Sulu region. Descendants of Tagimaha elites continued to hold leadership roles in local governance, trade networks, and regional diplomacy. Sulu genealogical records and colonial-era accounts describe Tagimaha families as part of the ruling and noble class that shaped political authority, economic activity, and inter-island relations over time.

==== Yakan Karajaan of Kumalarang ====
Records of pre-Hispanic Philippines gleaned from the extensive archives of China's Imperial courts mentions a Kingdom of Kumalarang located in one of the southern islands, whose King sent regular tribute to the Chinese Yongle Emperor through Chinese traders who frequented the place in the 13th and 14th centuries. Local historians attribute this long lost kingdom to modern-day Kumalarang (now reduced to a Barangay) located along the northwestern coast of Basilan island.

Specifically, according to the Collected Statutes of the Ming Dynasty, a report gleaned from the records of Dezhou, Shandong, China (archived and researched in the years 1673, 1788 and 1935): 3 months after the death of Paduka Batara (the Tausug potentate who visited the Chinese Emperor Yongle and died on October 23, 1417), a High Court Mandarin, Zhan Jian, was ordered to sail to Kumalarang (Chinese texts refer to "Kumalalang"), a vassal state of the Sulu Sultanate located on the northwestern coast of Taguima (Basilan Is.).

Zhan Jian was received by Lakan Ipentun (Ch. ref. "Kanlai Ipentun"), presumably a Yakan Prince, who ruled the Kingdom as a vassal to the Sultan of Sulu. The Mandarin official stayed in Kumalarang for two years before returning to China.

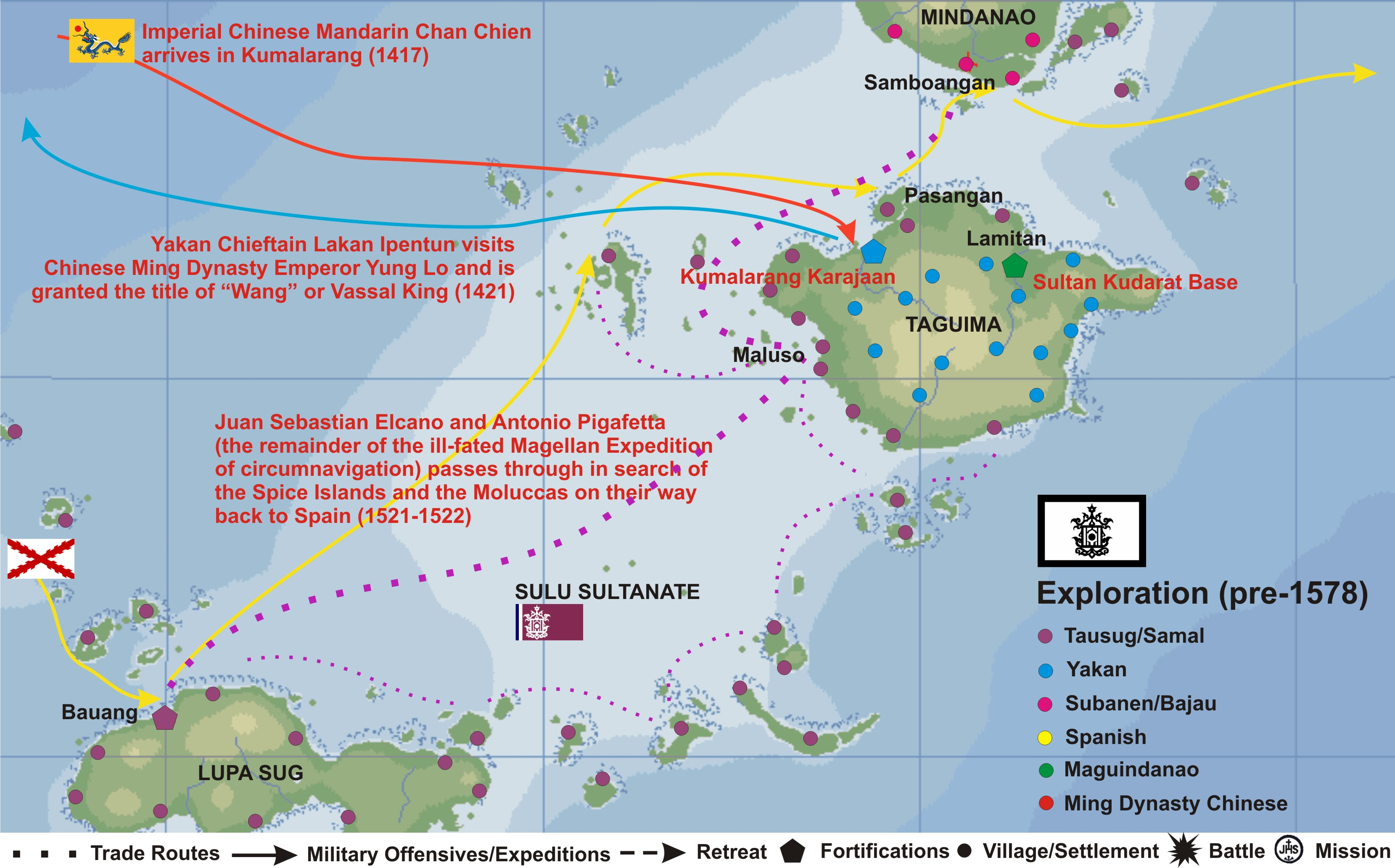
Basilan island circa 1578

He was accompanied by Lakan Ipentun and an entourage of several hundred, composed of his immediate family, minor chieftains (datus), and servants. They were finally given an audience with the Chinese Emperor on November 16, 1420, where he formally asked the latter to proclaim him as a recognized sovereign and vassal to the Dragon Throne.

Lakan Ipentun wrote a missive to the Chinese Emperor on December 28, 1420, complaining about the time it took for the Chinese Emperor to act on his request. The Chinese Emperor received the petition and finally granted Lakan Ipentun with the title of wang ("king"). After his request was granted, a satisfied Lakan Ipentun, along with his entire retinue, started for home.

On May 27, 1421, however, unaccustomed to the cold climate of the preceding winter and due to his advancing age, Lakan Ipentun died in Fujian, China, just as they were about to embark on Chinese junks that would have brought them home. His funeral was supervised by Yang Shan, administrator of the temples, and was likewise honored by a eulogy sent by the Chinese Emperor which extolled his virtues of "determination and serenity". His son, Lapi, was then proclaimed as rightful successor to the just bestowed title of wang. Lapi sent one of his father's most trusted officials, Batikisan, to petition for an audience with the Chinese Emperor where he presented a "memorial" in gold plaque on November 3, 1424.

The party, with its newly proclaimed King, eventually returned to Kumalarang, and almost just as promptly faded from the historical records of the period. (Note: Kumalarang was revived as a Barangay located on the northwestern shores of Isabela City in 1973).

==== Basilan during the Sulu Sultanate Era ====
As the Sulu Sultanate consolidated power, regional trade became increasingly centered in Jolo, reducing Basilan’s earlier prominence as a maritime trading hub. Over time, Basilan’s economy shifted toward localized production, inland agriculture, and resource-based livelihoods, as reflected in later historical and anthropological accounts. This transition marked Basilan’s changing role from a major regional trade center to a more locally oriented economic landscape.

Historical accounts indicate that the authority of the Sulu Sultanate was primarily concentrated in coastal and political centers, while inland communities in Basilan, including the Yakan, retained substantial local autonomy. Ethnographic studies suggest that Yakan communities were not tightly bound to the Sultanate’s administrative or political obligations, instead maintaining their own systems of communal governance, local leadership, and customary law.

During the period of the Sulu Sultanate, communities in Basilan historically associated with the Tagimaha continued to participate in regional trade, agriculture, and local leadership. Although the Tagimaha appear less frequently in later written records, Sulu genealogical traditions and colonial accounts suggest that Basilan-based Tagimaha families maintained influence by serving as local leaders, forming marriage ties with Sulu elites, and participating in regional commerce, allowing their identity and social status to endure over time.

The Tagimaha appear to have followed two historical paths: some became integrated into elite lineages within Sulu’s political sphere, while Tagimaha communities in Basilan gradually evolved into or were absorbed by what is now known as the Yakan population.

Today, Yakan cultural traditions in Basilan show continuity with earlier Tagimaha and Cham (Champa / Orang Dampuan) influences, especially in weaving traditions, maritime knowledge, settlement patterns, and oral histories connected to precolonial trade networks. These cultural practices reflect long-term continuity shaped by both Cham contact and indigenous Basilan heritage.

=== Spanish arrival ===
==== Colonization and the Jesuit "reducciones" ====
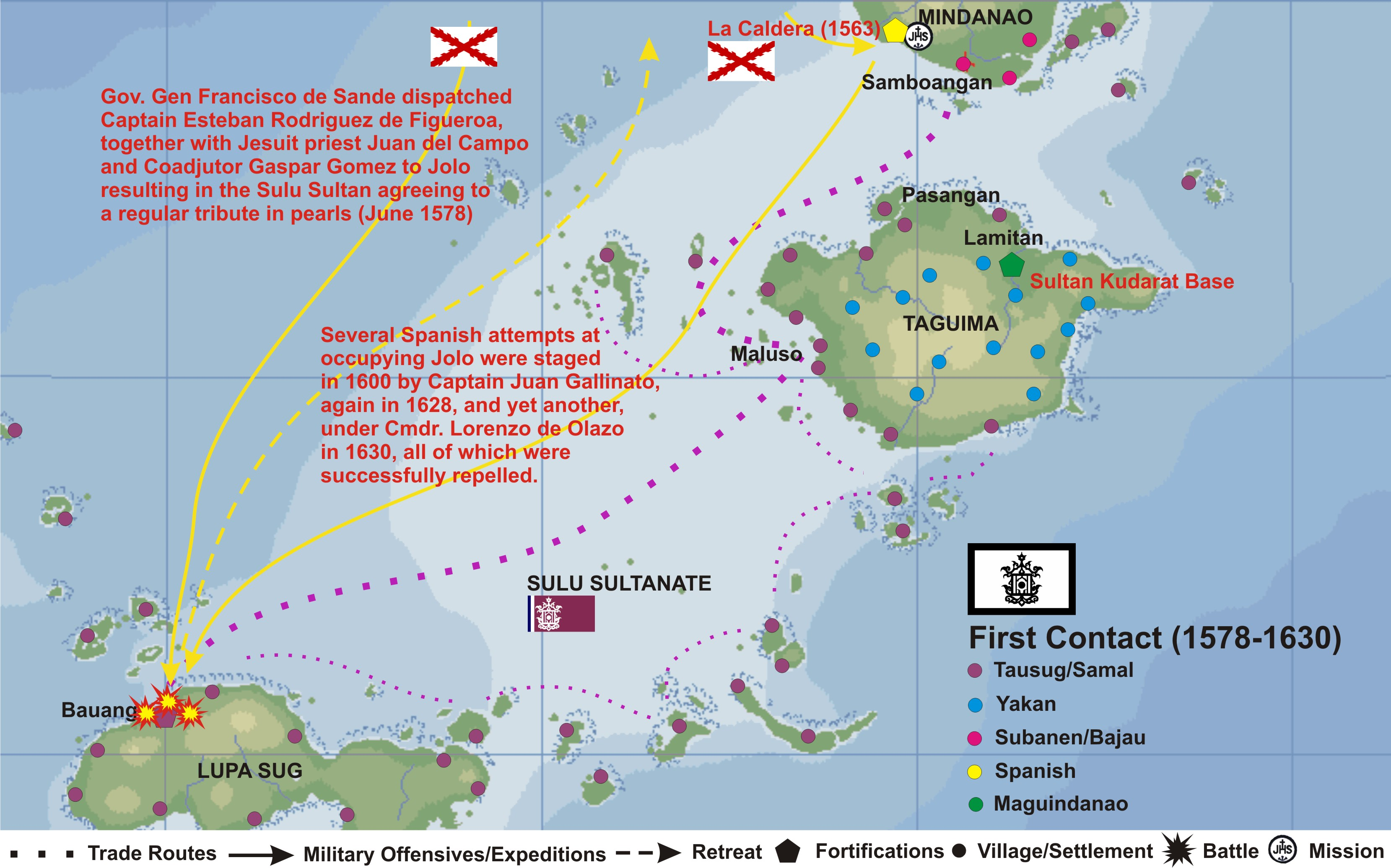
Basilan island 1578–1630

The proselytization of Basilan started in earnest when Fr. Francisco Lado, a Jesuit, established the first Catholic mission, in an area called Pasangen by the native Yakans. "Pasangen" is a Yakan term for "commune", "town" or "a place where people visit or stay". This coastal area, however, was already predominantly populated by Tausug and Samal settlers when the Spanish came, and therefore was likewise locally called a "pagpasalan" or "settlement area". The Jesuit missionaries from Zamboanga arrived on the same year that the removal of Sultan Kudarat's base from Lamitan was effected, and established themselves in Pasangen on the island's northwestern coast. They constructed the first wooden mission and palisade wall near the mouth of the Aguada River and dedicated the Island to St. Ignatius of Loyola, the founder of the Jesuit Order.

Catholic missionaries together with Spanish soldiers who inter-married into the native population were able to successfully penetrate Basilan by bringing in additional Settler soldiers. So much so that by 1654 about 1,000 Catholic families were living on the island. Foremost among these pioneering families is the extended Lazaro Clan who, together with its cadet branches, the Saavedra, Generalao, San Luis, Suson, Pardo, Barrios and Guevarra families, took most of the cultivated lands that were to form part of the growing Settlement.

Thus, Catholicism began to slowly spread across the island with the spirited drive of the militant Jesuits. With no spices or gold to enrich the Spanish king's coffers, except for local taxes, the Jesuits refocused the Spanish government's agenda and made religion the object of their expansion and conquest here.

In anticipation of an invasion from the Chinese pirate-warlord Koxinga, that was expected to devastate Manila, the Spanish authorities withdrew all stations in the south of the country to augment their forces holed up in Intramuros, temporarily freeing Zamboanga and Isabela from direct Spanish administration in 1663.

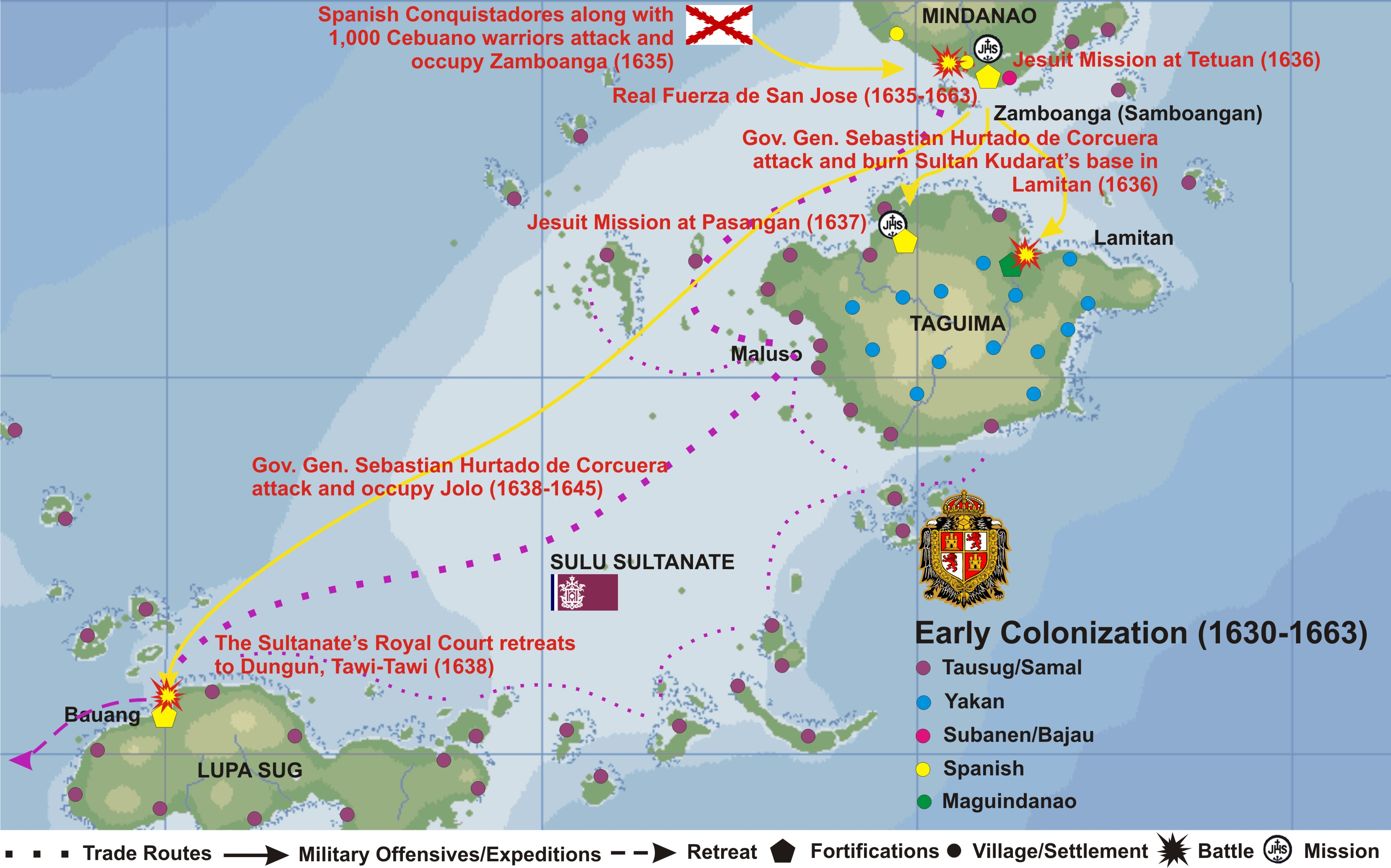
Basilan Island 1630–1663

Governor Sabiniano Manrique de Lara signed a decree on May 6, 1662, ordering the military evacuation of the fort in Zamboanga, and of other Spanish colonies, including that of Ternate in the spice islands of the Moluccas. The Spanish garrisons, along with several priests and their chosen local people, evacuated and returned to Fort Cavite to help defend Manila Intramuros from a threatened invasion by Chinese pirate Koxinga, which never happened. The Zamboanga fort was finally abandoned sometime in 1663 by the last remaining Spanish troops.

The Zamboangueño (the forced Settlers from Luzon and Visayas who populated Zamboanga) and Pasangen, Jesuits included, settled for another 56 years (1662–1718) of isolated existence, motivated by the threat of the Moro master seafarers who overtook and destroyed the abandoned fort. The Zamboangueños who stayed behind, including many of the founding Jesuit priests with a religious outpost, were by this time already living within the confines of Zamboanga and Pasangen and its people. The Jesuits who remained in Zamboanga were historically credited for reconstructing the damaged fort in 1666, three years after the last Spanish soldiers vacated the walled post in 1663.

In the absence of Spanish Royal authorities, the Jesuits formed a sort of Catholic city-state, called "reductions" (Spanish Reducciones, Portuguese Reduções) in and around their 3-decade-old Presidios both in Zamboanga and Basilan. These were Societies set up according to an idealized theocratic model. The same type of communities were likewise established by the Jesuits throughout South America, but especially in present-day Brazil and Paraguay.

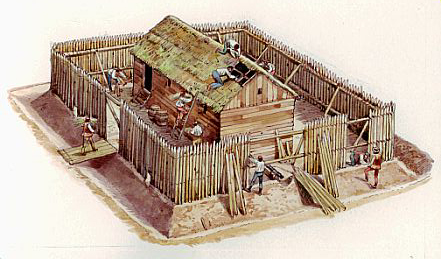
Illustration of the Spanish palisade fortification and Jesuit mission constructed at Pasangen, on the northwestern coast of Taguima.

The Spanish royal authorities eventually returned in 1718. After having re-established lucrative trading agreements with the native kingdoms that dotted the area, nearby Zamboanga experienced a revival in its economy. The increasingly wealthy Spanish trading post in Zamboanga became an even more sought-after prize for the Moro seafarers of the era, so much so that the surrounding islands started to attract the attention of other foreign powers, and chief among these coveted islands was Basilan.

Hostilities with the Moro natives and Lumad allies resurfaced in the 18th century and this was triggered by the decision which broke beforehand agreements not to build any additional Forts by both parties when in 1718 Gov. Gen Juan Antonio de la Torre Bustamante went ahead to reconstruct Real Fuerza de San José in Bagumbayan, Zamboanga. The fort completed in 1719 was renamed Real Fuerza del Pilar de Zaragosa (Fort Pilar is its popular name today). The rebuilt fort was inaugurated on April 16 by Don Fernando Bustillos Bustamante Rueda, senior maestro de campo of Zamboanga. Three years later in 1722, as the primary reason to build this Fort, the Spaniards were launching another expedition against Jolo. Led by Andres Garcia, the expedition failed miserably.

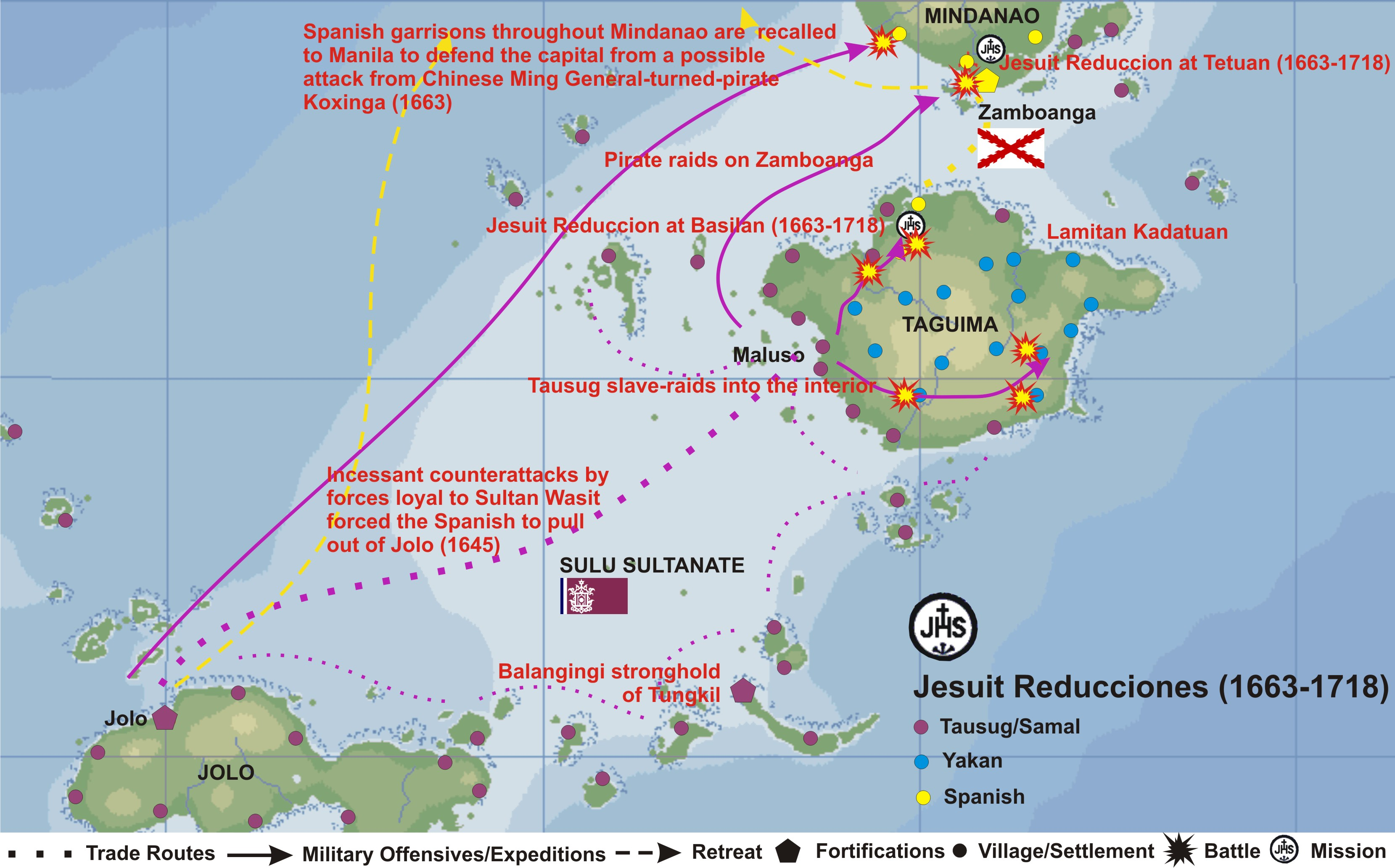
Basilan island 1663–1718

By then, Badar ud-Din, Sultan of Sulu, who was keenly interested in developing commercial ties with Manila and China, approached the Spanish with a proposal of peace. According to the agreement they arrived at in 1726, the Spanish and Sulu were permitted to trade freely with each other and the Island of Basilan was ceded to Spain. However, in a series of raids on the islands of Visayas, where the Spanish themselves got manpower and resources for Zamboanga, angry subjects of the Sultan broke the treaty which resulted in the renewal of large-scale hostilities by 1730. In 1731, General Ignacio Iriberri lead a force of 1000 to Jolo and captured it after a lengthy siege. But the Spaniards left after a few days.

To strengthen the Spanish position in Zamboanga and the neighbouring regions, three companies of native Visayan volunteers were organized in 1832. These natives together with the Spanish troops defended the town and the province from the sporadic attack by the Moros. However, these Visayan natives, mixed with released prisoners from the Luzon lived outside the Fort walls and bore the brunt of the attacks from the Moro warriors. The Spaniards call the Sultan of Sulu's army Moros, Spanish for "Moors", the word Moor was in turn derived from Morocco a North African country adjacent to Spain, and peopled by Muslims who conquered and ruled Al Andalus Spain for 800 years.

Half of the Zamboanga peninsula was made into a Corregimiento (district) de Zamboanga with its jurisdiction reaching as far as Sindangan to the north and the whole of Basilan island to the south, while the northern half of the peninsula belonged to the District of Misamis. In 1837, the government was changed to a Gobierno Militar. Zamboanga was made the capital of Mindanao throughout the Spanish regime, except for the period between 1872 and 1875, when the government was at Kutawato/ Cotabato.

==== Jesuit expulsion ====
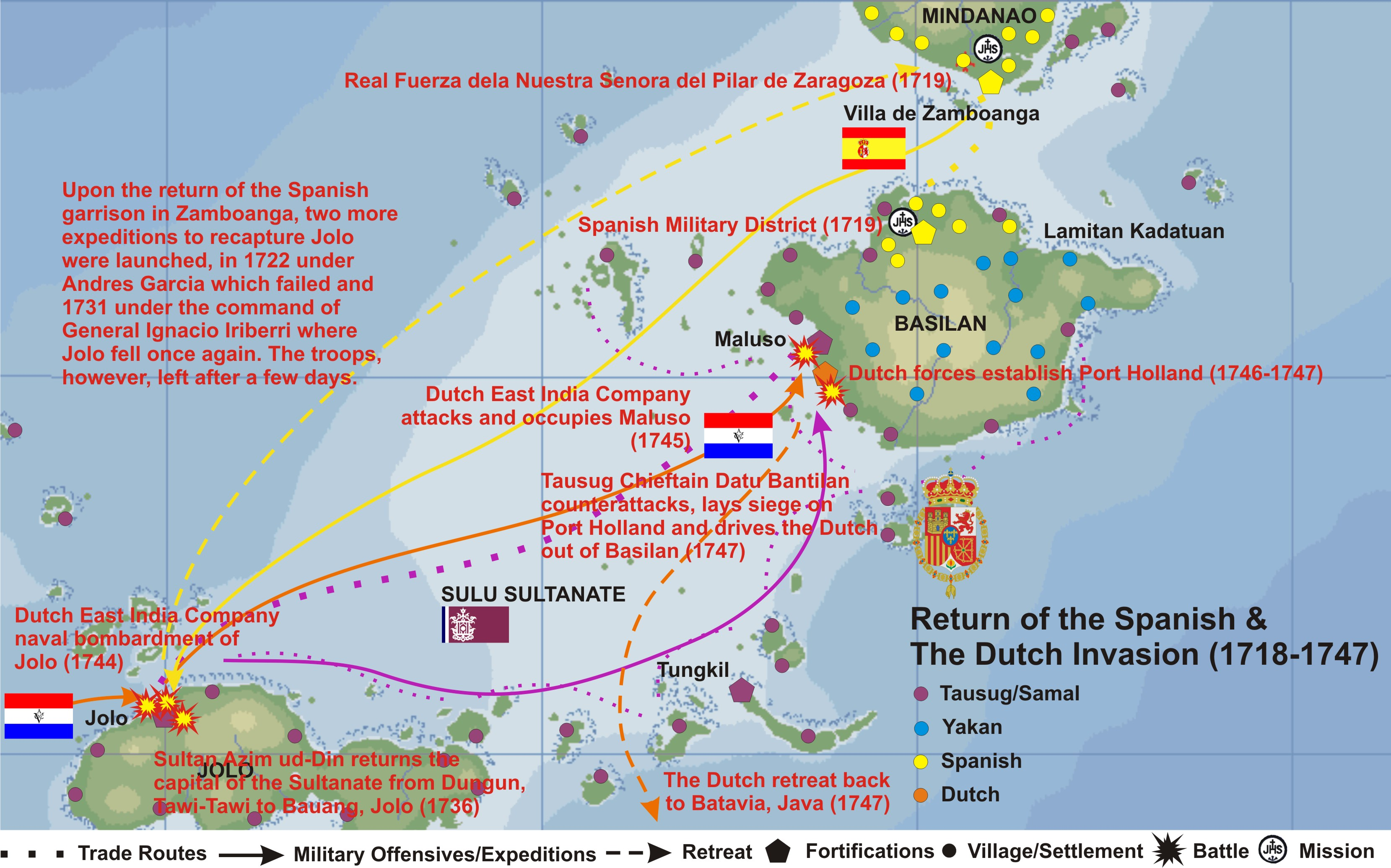
Basilan island 1718–1747

In the meantime, the Jesuits were expelled from Portugal, France, the Two Sicilies, Parma and the Spanish Empire in 1768. Jesuit missions were very controversial in Europe, especially in Spain and Portugal, where they were seen as interfering with the proper colonial enterprises of the royal governments. The Jesuits were often the only force standing between the natives and slavery. It is partly because the Jesuits protected the natives whom mainly it wanted to convert to Catholism that certain Spanish and Portuguese colonizers wanted to enslave that the Society of Jesus was eventually suppressed. The Recoletos de San Jose (Recollects) took over territories previously assigned to the Jesuits.

In 1755, a contingent of 1,900 men led by captains Simeon Valdez and Pedro Gastambide was sent to Jolo to avenge for the raids by Sultan Muiz ud-Din. But were roundly defeated again. In 1775, after Moro raid on Zamboanga, Capitan Vargas led a punitive expedition against Jolo but was also repulsed.

Throughout this brief period, however, Catholic missionaries continued their avid proselytization, converting very hard the clans of Subanen, Samals, Yakans and Tausugs to Catholicism, adding to the growing Visayan populations brought in primarily from Cebu and Panay.

==== The French blockade ====
By the 1840s, colonial interests other than Spanish focused over western Mindanao, particularly the territories under the Sulu sultanate. The British, French, Germans, and Americans all became interested in these rich islands.

In 1843, the French Foreign Minister François Guizot sent a fleet to Vietnam under Admiral Cécille and Captain Charner, which started the French intervention in Vietnam. The move responded to the successes of the British in China in 1842, and France hoped to counterbalance these successes by accessing China from the south. The pretext, however, was to support British efforts in China, and to fight the persecution of French missionaries in Vietnam. The fleet, accompanied by the diplomat Lagrene, tried to seize the island of Basilan in order to create a base similar to Hong Kong, but projects had to be abandoned following the strong opposition of Spain claiming the island was part of the Philippines.

When the French under Admiral Cécille blockaded Basilan in 1844–45, an island which they called Taguime, intent on establishing a network of naval stations to protect French trade in the area, the Spanish governor protested that Basilan had recognized Spain's sovereignty just the year before, in February 1844. The French then forced the Basilan datus to sign a document affirming the "absolute independence of Basilan vis-a-vis Spain" on January 13, 1845, aboard the steamer Archimede.

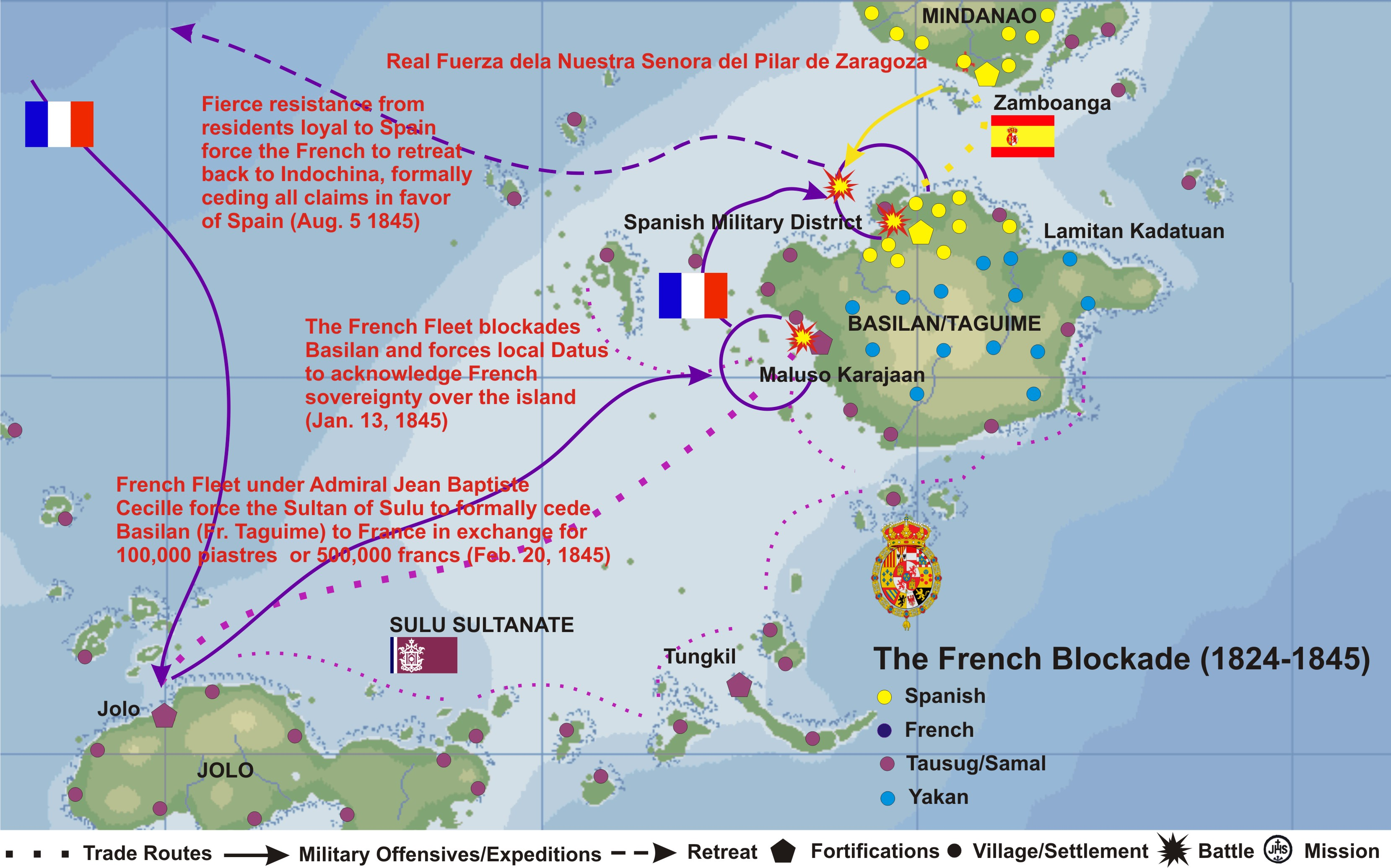
Basilan island 1824–1845

On February 20, 1845, France forced the Sulu Sultan to formally cede Basilan Island to France in exchange for 100,000 piastres or 500,000 French francs. The French Admiral totally ignored Spanish protests. However, the inhabitants of Pasangen who remained loyal to Spain, fought against the French for a year, forcing the French King, Louis Philippe, also a Bourbon, to ultimately decide against taking Basilan although the French Cabinet already approved the annexation, even allocating the budget for Basilan for that year.

France's claims on Basilan were based on a formal cession from the Sultan of Sulu as well as formal written agreement from the Basilan datus. These claims were eventually withdrawn by France, formalized in a proclamation dated August 5, 1845, turning over full sovereignty of the island to Spain. During the same year, a US survey mission studied the potentials of the Sulu archipelago, but U.S. intervention did not start until 1899.

==== Fuerte de la Reina Isabel Segunda ====
After two centuries of incessant and unrelenting raids and counter-raids, the fortunes of the Spanish Empire in the Sulu Archipelago took a dramatic turn for the better in 1848, primarily due to three watershed events: the advent of Spain's steam-powered naval superiority over Sulu's outrigger-and-sail paraws; the fall of Sulu's Balangingi allies on Tungkil; and, the establishment of Fuerte Isabel Segunda or Fort Isabella Segunda on Basilan Island. These three benchmarks sparked off a series of events which, from 1848 on, saw Sulu's power wane until it was finally blighted and almost completely snuffed out on the eve of the American occupation.

To check the inroads of both the increasingly bloody Tausug pirate raids and the growing influence of Lamitan's Yakan kingdom, as well as to thwart any further attempt by other European powers to colonize Basilan (the Dutch in 1747 and the French in 1844) the Spanish commandery in Zamboanga City sent over an expeditionary force tasked at establishing Spanish fortifications on Basilan island, both to serve as an early beacon and defensive perimeter against the pirate parties, and as a trading post for Spanish interests on the island.

In 1845, Don Ramon Lobo, the Marine Chief of Zamboanga, accompanied Don Cayetano Suarez de Figueroa, District Governor of Zamboanga, to the coastal settlement of Pasangen. Wooden fortifications were initially erected on the settlement's highest point facing the narrow channel about 800 meters from the shore. The 200-year-old Jesuit mission was situated halfway between the fort and the shore. The fortification proved to be easily defensible as nearby Malamawi Island blocked direct attacks and raids from the sea. Later that same year, Governor Narciso Claveria ordered the construction of a stone fort, following the plan of engineer Emilio Bernaldez submitted in 1844. Construction lasted four years.

By 1848, the stone fort was finished, replacing the wooden fortifications. In the meantime, a sizeable and growing Christian settlement continued to flourish around the Recollect mission, rededicated since the expulsion of the Jesuits, to St Isabel de Portugal (Elizabeth of Portugal). The Fort thus established was subsequently named in honor of Queen Isabella II of Spain and the Indies, and was named Fuerte de la Reina Isabel Segunda. The military garrison was initially placed under the direct command of the Fuerza de Nuestra Señora del Pilar de Zaragosa (Fort Pilar) in Zamboanga.

Nieto Aguilar (1894) describes the fort as "magnificent." Situated 20 meters above sea level, the fortification overlooked the two entrances to the bay, formed by Basilan and Malamawi Island. To the fort's east were the barracks. The fort had four bastions at the corner of its rectangular perimeter. It enclosed a well and had four structures for the corps of guards, the garrison personnel, the presidio, jail, artillery corps and the casa comandancia.

In the fort was the governor's residence as well as that of his officials. It was also a naval station where the navy maintained small workshops for urgent repairs. It had a storehouse for coal near the shore. Total personnel: two officers, 50 men.

Outside the fort were built other structures, namely: a military infirmary, school, ayuntamiento (city hall), corps of engineers’ building, storehouses and dependencies of the naval station, barracks for the marine infantry, gunpowder storehouse, and the Jesuit church and convent.

On July 30, 1859, a royal decree was issued allowing the Jesuits to recover their Missions in Mindanao from the Recollects. The Jesuits finally returned to Basilan and Tetuan in 1862.

By 1863, Fort Isabela Segunda became the focal point of the 6th District of the Police-Military Government of Mindanao. And in 1879, the Spanish garrison built a "floating" Naval Hospital on shallows guarding the eastern entrance to the Isabela Channel.

The fort and naval hospital were demolished in the 20th century, when they were reduced to rubble by American bombs during World War II. The Basilan provincial capitol presently occupies the site of the demolished fort. Recent site excavations yielded rusted cannonballs and other late 19th- and early 20th-century paraphernalia in caverns dug deep beneath the former fort.

==== American regime ====
By 1898, Basilan Island was administratively divided into three districts, the Spanish-controlled towns of Isabela and Lamitan, and the Tausug trading outpost in Maluso, which the Sulu Sultanate handed-over to Spain, subsequent to the razing and occupation of Jolo by the Spanish from 1876 up to 1899, formalized by the Treaty of 1878.

Spain ceded its claim over the Philippine islands to the United States in the Treaty of Paris which ended the Spanish–American War. Following the American occupation of the northern Philippine Islands during 1899, Spanish forces in Mindanao were cut off, and they retreated to the garrisons at Zamboanga and Jolo. American forces relieved the Spanish at Zamboanga on May 18, 1899, and at Jolo and Basilan in December 1899.

==== American occupation ====
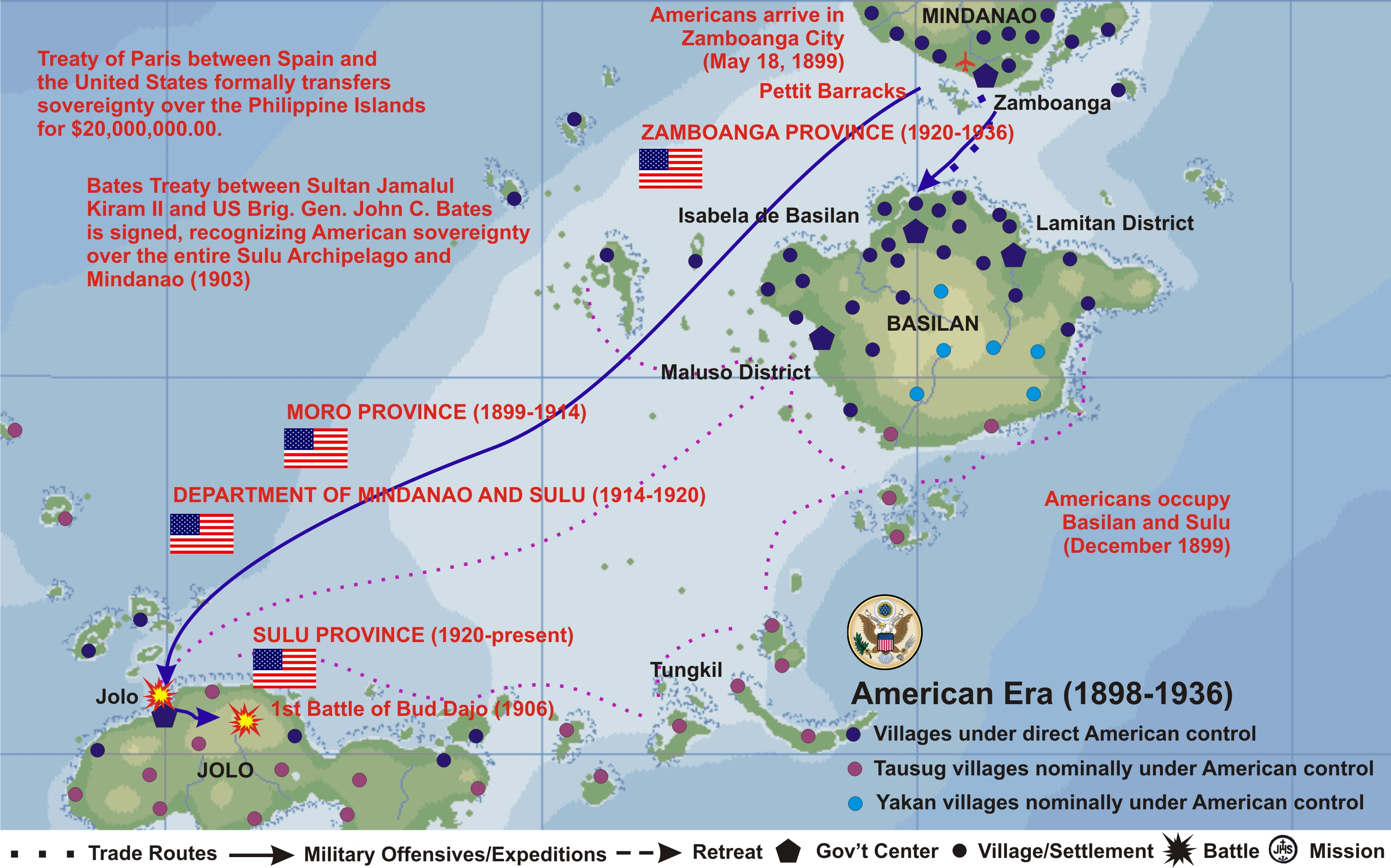
Basilan island 1898–1936

On December 8, 1899, American troops took over the Spanish garrison in Zamboanga, one of the last strongholds of the Filipino revolutionaries in Mindanao. By December 1899, the Americans led by Col. James S. Petit occupied the Spanish naval base of Isabela de Basilan. In Basilan, an increasingly old and sickly Datu Kalun (Pedro Cuevas) supported the new colonizers. Sovereignty over both Isabela and Lamitan then was effectively transferred from Spain to the Americans.

At that time, the Philippine–American War was raging in Luzon. So as not to spread out their forces, the Americans employed the classic divide-and-rule tactic. Maj. Gen. E.S. Otis, commander-in-chief of the US Forces, sent Gen. Bates to negotiate with the Sultan of Sulu. Known as the Bates treaty, the agreement provided for the exercise of American authority over the Sulu archipelago in exchange for the recognition of Muslim culture and religion. However this was contrasted by the Republic of Zamboanga which claimed sovereignty over the whole of Mindanao, which El Presidente Isidoro Midel and Datu Mandi briefly ruled. A place where religious freedom was practiced and interbaptism and syncretism common.

The Bates Treaty of 1899 between Sulu Sultan Jamalul Kiram II and American Brigadier General John C. Bates, further acknowledged American administrative control over the Sulu Archipelago, including Basilan.

Initially, Sultan Kiram was disappointed by the hand-over of control to the Americans and had expected to regain sovereignty over the Sulu archipelago after the defeat of the Spanish. Bates' main goal though, was to guarantee the Sultanate's neutrality in the Philippine–American War, and to establish order in Mindanao. After some negotiations, the Bates Treaty was signed.

This treaty was based on the earlier Spanish treaty, and it retained the translation discrepancy: the English version described a complete dependency, while the Tausug version described a protectorate. Although the Bates Treaty granted more powers to the Americans than the original Spanish treaty, the treaty was still criticised in the United States for granting too much autonomy to the Sultan. One particular clause, which recognized the Moro practice of slavery, also raised eyebrows in Washington, D.C. Bates later admitted that the treaty was merely a stop-gap measure, signed only to buy time until the war in the north was ended and more forces could be brought to bear in the south.

The peace created by the Bates Treaty did not last, however. This became evident when the Muslims repudiated the Moro province, a politico-military government in Mindanao lasting from 1903 to 1914, and the Moro Rebellion soon broke out. Barely two months before the creation of the Moro province, the American colonial government declared and classified all unoccupied lands as public lands. Immediately after the declaration, American investments entered Mindanao and mass migration of Christians was encouraged. (Rodil 1985:4).

The American forces eventually arrived under the command of Capt. Wendell C. Neville, who eventually became a Major General, the 14th Commandant of the United States Marine Corps in 1929–1930. He was initially posted as Military Governor of Basilan from 1899 to 1901, and was tasked at the establishment of a civil government for the island of Basilan.

By July 1, 1901, the Municipality of Zamboanga was inaugurated under Public Act No. 135. This constituted Zamboanga and Basilan Island.

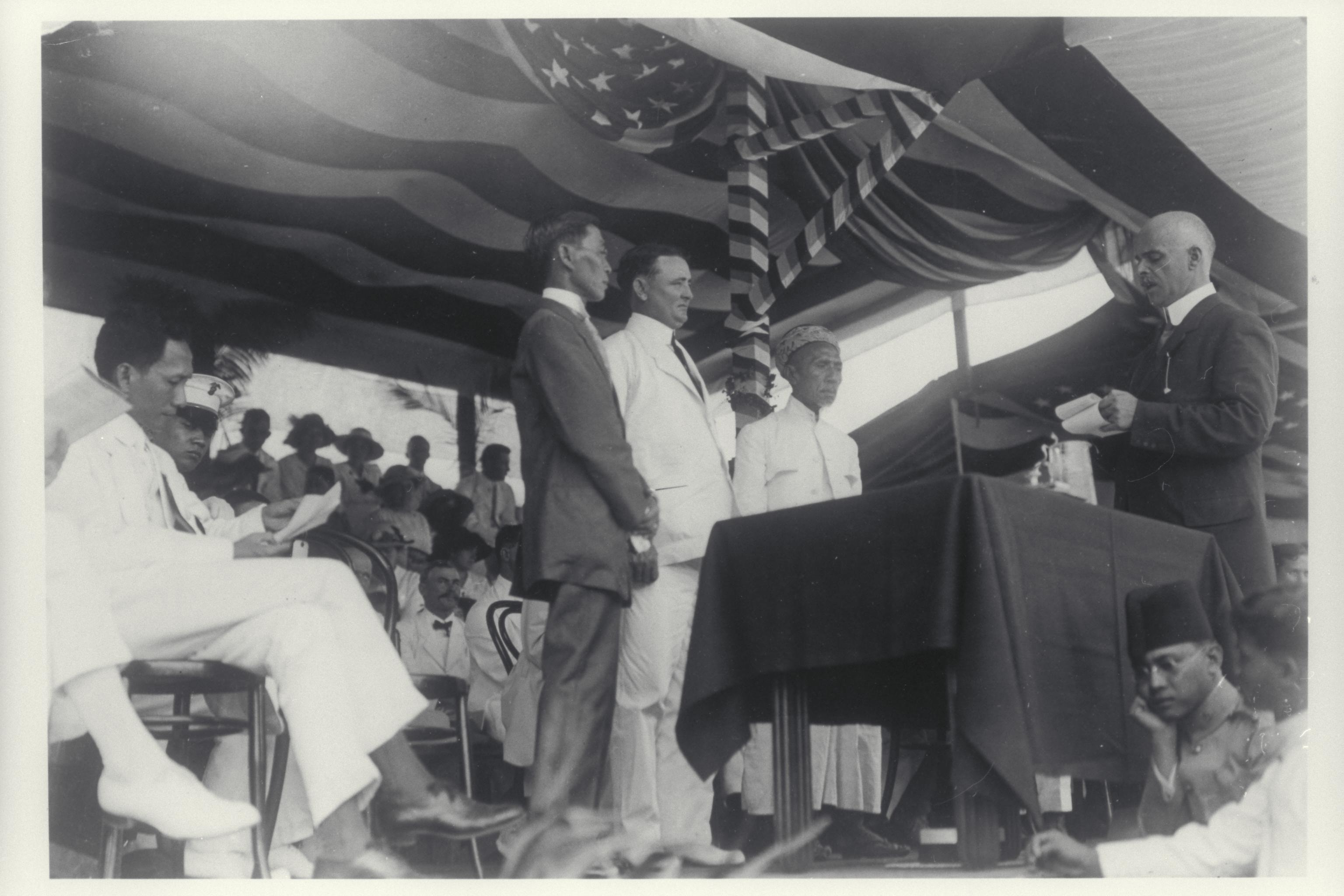
Inauguration of the Municipality of Zamboanga which included Basilan, July 1, 1901, with Datu Kalun (background) in attendance

On September 15, 1911, the governing body of the Moro Province, the Legislative Council, passed Act. No.272 converting the Municipality of Zamboanga into a city with a Commission form of government. The ceremony was held on January 1, 1912, with the appointment of American Christopher F. Bader as the first City Mayor. With the island of Basilan as part of Zamboanga, this made the City of Zamboanga the biggest city in the world in terms of land area. Two years later he was succeeded by Victoriano Tarrosas the first Filipino Zamboangueño Mayor of the city when Bader resigned.

The Department of Mindanao and Sulu replaced the Moro Province in 1914, and its districts broken up into separate provinces, namely: Davao, Misamis, Lanao, Cotabato, Sulu, and Zamboanga, the city was then reverted to its original status as a municipality administered by a Municipal President and several Councilors. The municipality included the whole of Basilan Island and it remained as the capital of the Department of Mindanao and Sulu, with a civil government under an American civil governor, from 1913 up to 1920.

The Department of Mindanao and Sulu under Gov. Frank W. Carpenter was created by Philippine Commission Act 2309 (1914) and ended on February 5, 1920, by Act of Philippine Legislature No. 2878. The Bureau of Non-Christian Tribes was organized and briefly headed by Teofisto Guingona Sr. With the enactment by the US Congress of the Jones Law (Philippine Autonomy Law) in 1916, ultimate Philippine independence was guaranteed and the Filipinization of public administration began.

Datu Kalun died in Basilan on July 16, 1904, at the age of 58, soon after his first contact with the Americans. His nephew Gabino Pamaran became his successor and adopted the name Datu Mursalun. Mursalun, also pro-American, led the town of Lamitan which became an American model of civil government and development. Mursalun worked for the material progress of Basilan, and sought ways to fight banditry and piracy in the area.

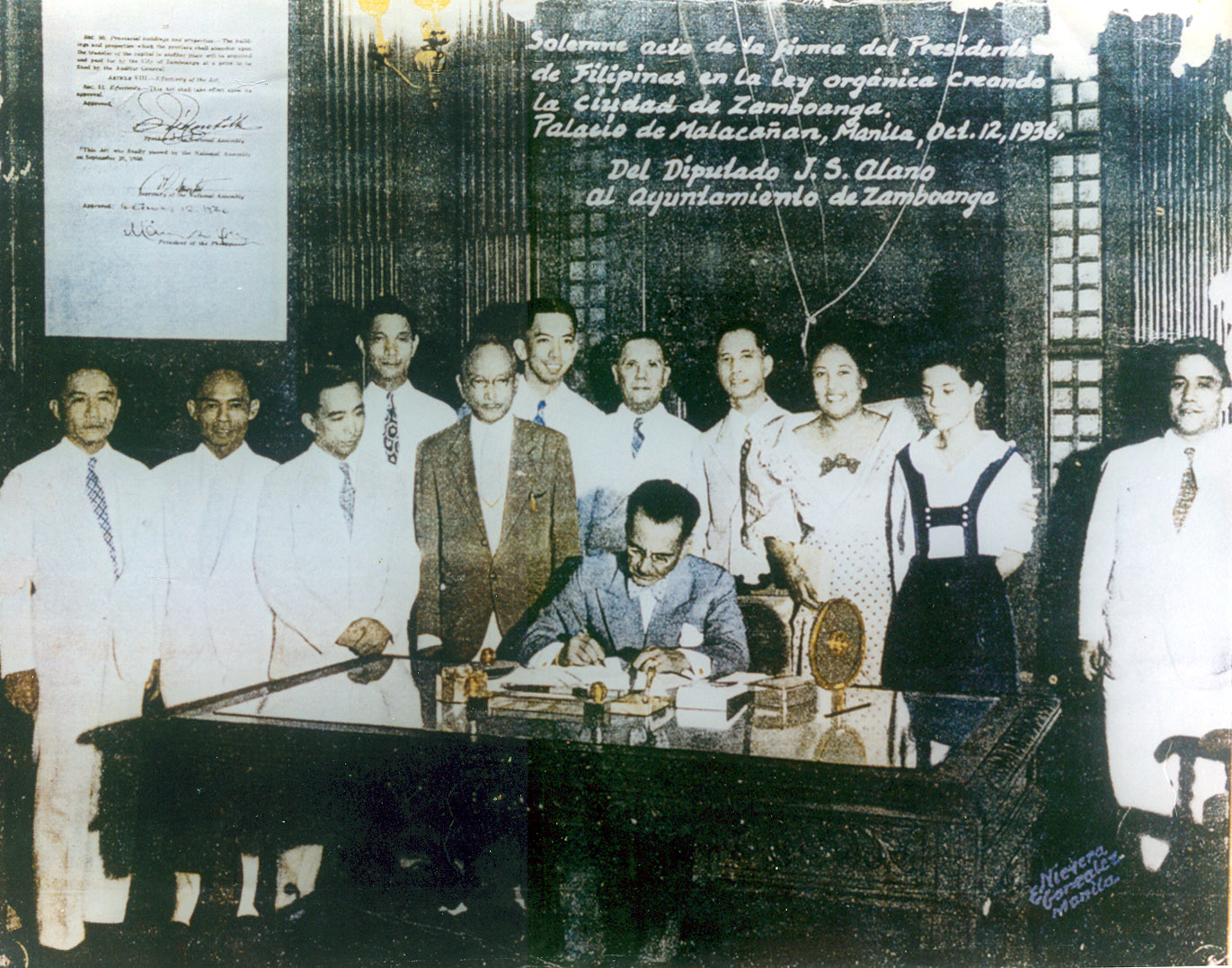
Official Signing Ceremony of the Charter of Zamboanga City by President Manuel Quezon, and witnessed by bill author Cong. Juan S. Alano and wife Ramona, Zamboanga Mayor Pablo Lorenzo, and a young Ma. Clara Lorenzo (Lobregat) in her school uniform.

==== Philippine Commonwealth ====
Politically, Basilan became a part of the Moro Province (1899–1914, encompassing most of Mindanao Island). Basilan was then included in the Department of Mindanao and Sulu (1914–1920), a district of Zamboanga Province (1920–1936), and then of the Chartered City of Zamboanga (1936–1948), before it became a Chartered City on its own right at the beginning of the Philippine Republic.

Alongside military suppression came a policy of education. Public schools were built but Muslim enrollment was way below Christian school attendance. Muslims considered public education a threat to their culture and religion.

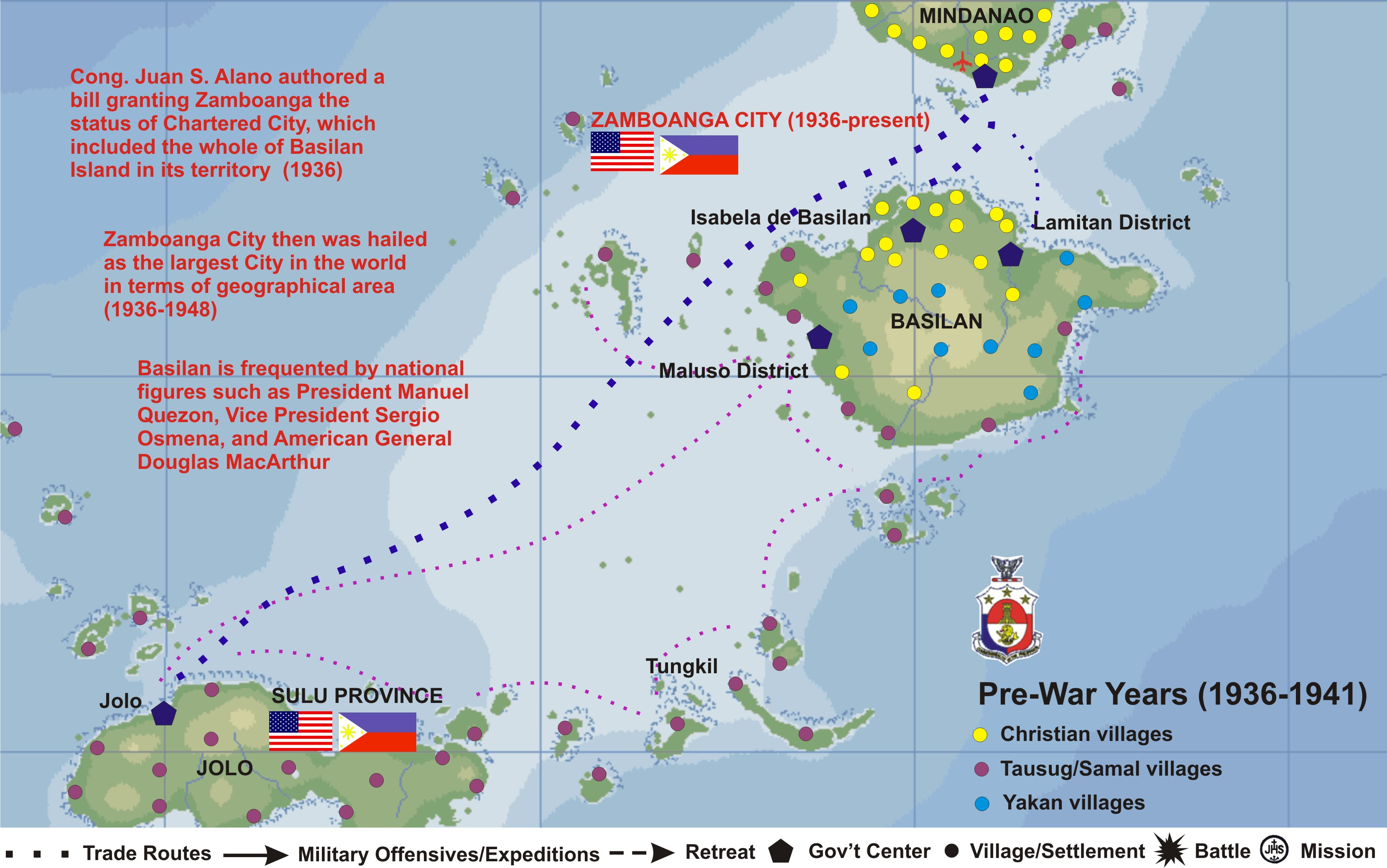
Basilan island 1936–1941

To ensure Muslim participation in government affairs, the Americans soon adopted a Policy of Attraction for western Mindanao. Moreover, the Philippine Constabulary (PC) replaced the United States Army units pursuant to colonial efforts to reduce American presence. The replacement of American troops, mostly by Christians under the PC, increased the hostility between Muslims and Christians.

In the political sphere, the management of Muslim affairs through the organization of the Department of Mindanao and Sulu in 1914 was unsuccessful, as leadership in the department fell in the hands of Christians. Thus, the Muslim leaders were historically opposed to the idea of independence, which meant the incorporation of Muslim areas into a political system dominated by Christians.

Early in the American period, American plantation owners cleared vast expanses of Basilan's virgin forest land and established what was to be Basilan's primary economic activity - plantation agriculture, mainly rubber and copra. American Dr. James D. W. Strong, the Father of the Philippine Rubber Industry, inaugurated the first rubber plantation in the Philippines (inauguration was attended by President Manuel L. Quezon no-less) in Baluno, a plaque and shrine to this pioneering individual may be visited in the same Barangay to this day.

The success of what was soon to be the B. F. Goodrich rubber concession in the northern part of Isabela City, enticed other multi-national firms, such as the British-Malaysian Sime Darby and the Hispano-German Hans Menzi Corporation to open rubber plantations in the city's southern areas. The first Filipino-owned plantation was established on Malamawi Island by Don Juan S. Alano, originally of Malolos, Bulacan, who served as Representative of the entire Moro Province (Mindanao) during the Commonwealth Era (1936–1942), and the first Congressman of Zamboanga Province (now comprising Zamboanga del Norte, Zamboanga del Sur, Zamboanga Sibugay, Zamboanga City and Basilan) in the Republic's first Congress (1946–1949). He authored the Charter of both the Cities of Basilan and Zamboanga.

More Filipino settler families, such as the Cuevas-Flores-Pamaran-Antonio clan (progeny of the legendary Datu Kalun) in Lamitan and the Pardo, Barandino, Brown, Dans, Golveo, and Nuñal families of Isabela itself soon followed suit, establishing sizeable plantations, usually engaged in coconut/copra production.

==== World War II ====
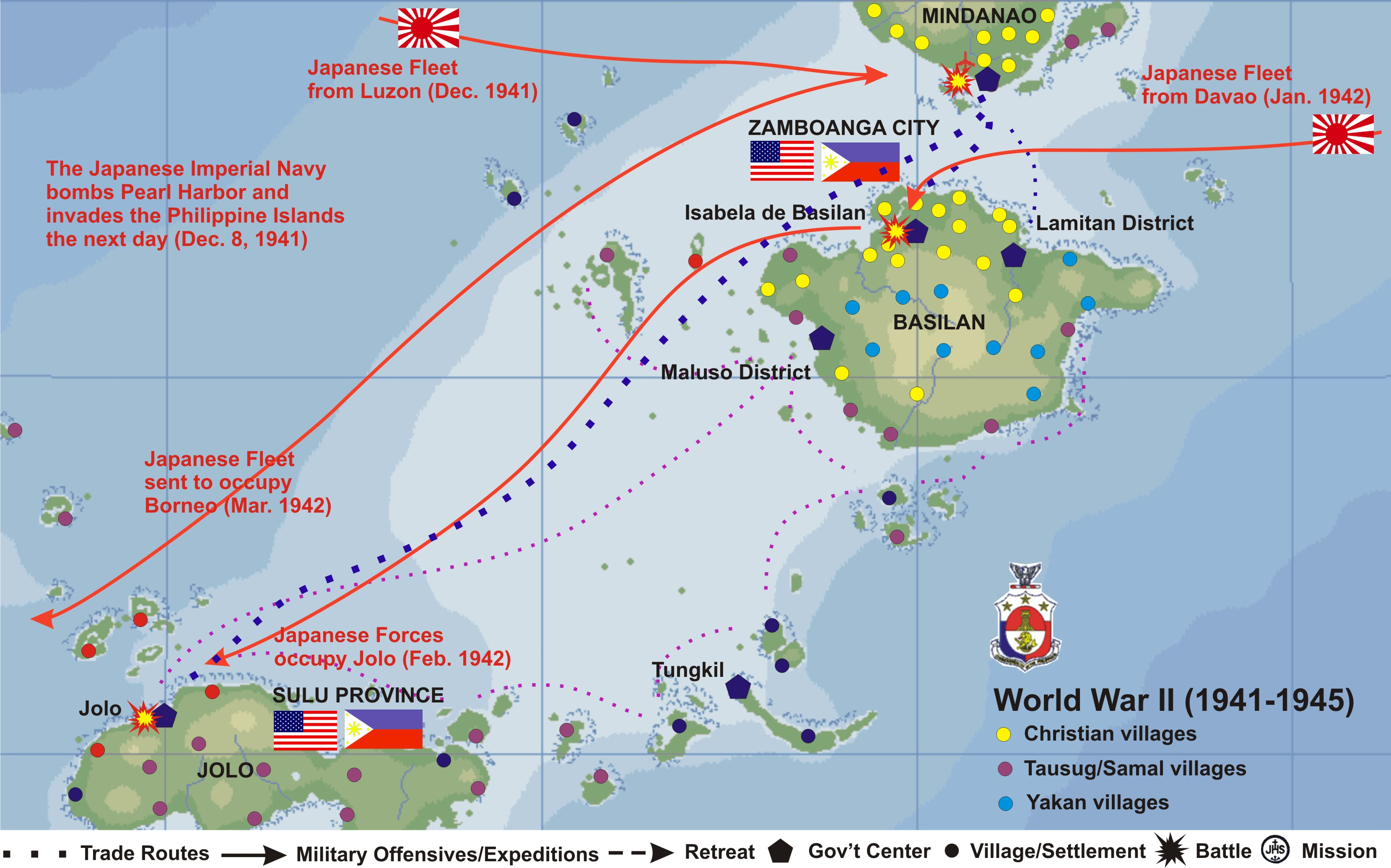
Japanese invasion of Basilan

The outbreak of World War II disrupted Commonwealth administration. In 1942 Japanese soldiers landed in Basilan and occupied it until 1945.

Christians and Muslim officers and men of the military district in Mindanao and Sulu shifted to the Moro guerilla activities against the Japanese. A civil government called Free Sulu Government administered activities in the locality.

The Japanese Occupation forces established a government in Basilan to govern both Zamboanga and Basilan. The Japanese Occupation of Basilan was rather uneventful, however, it barely affected the residents, except in terms of Japanese demand for food for their military machinery. In fact, Datu Mursalun and his family watched, without much interest, the American bombings of the Spanish fort and naval hospital in Isabela which signaled the retaking of Basilan by joint Filipino and American troops in 1945.

Alongside the Zamboanga operation, smaller units of the Military Forces of the Philippine Commonwealth and the Soldiers of the U.S. 41st Division invaded the Sulu Archipelago, a long stretch of islands reaching from the Zamboanga Peninsula to North Borneo. Rapidly taken in succession were Basilan, Malamawi, Tawi-Tawi, Sanga Sanga and Bongao. It is during this phase of the operations when American bombing raids completely destroyed Fort Isabela Segunda, which was used by the Japanese as military headquarters, prison and munitions dump, and razed the "Spanish" Naval Hospital. Minimal resistance from entrenched Japanese positions in Isabela and Malamawi Island brought about a quick reoccupation which was completed by the beginning of April. On April 9, strong resistance at Jolo was encountered. Anchoring their stubborn defense around Mount Dabo, some 3,900 Japanese troops held off the U.S. 163rd Infantry supported by Filipino soldiers and other local Moro guerrillas. By April 22, the Allies took the position after hard fighting and the rest of the troops fled and held out in the west for another two months. The 163rd suffered 40 dead and 125 wounded by mid-June 1945, while some 2,000 Japanese perished.

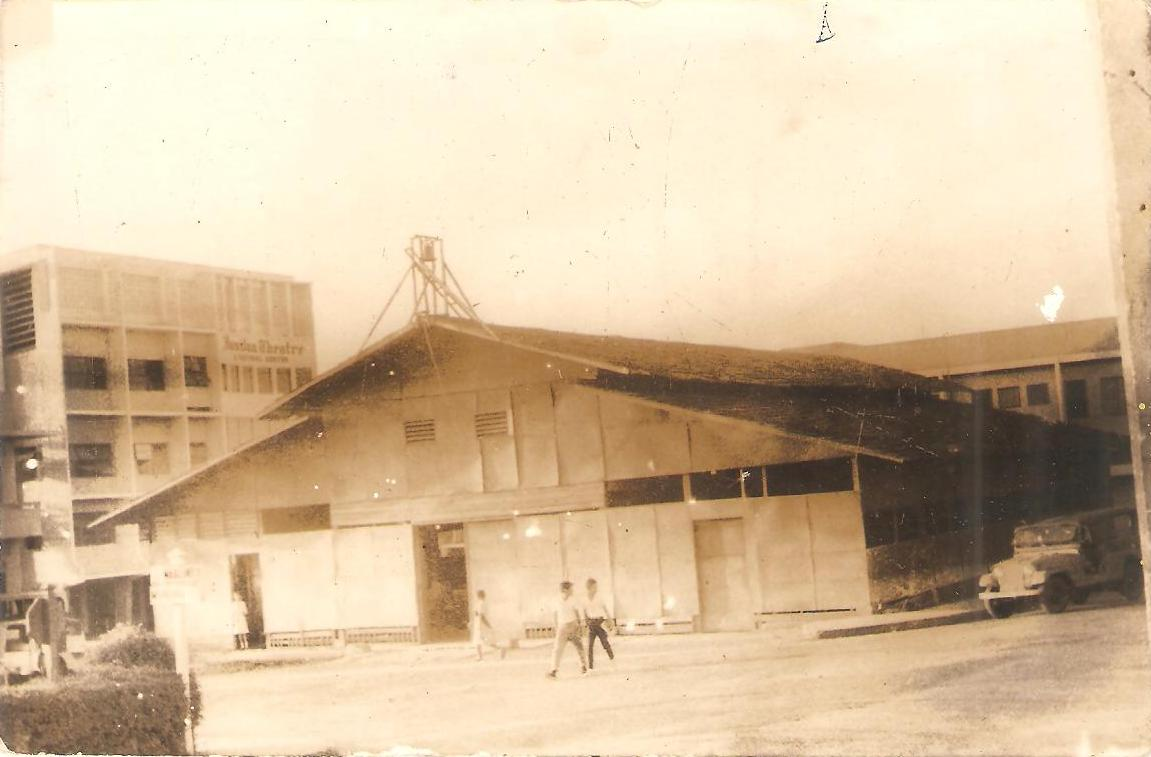
Old Santa Isabel Cathedral, with the Alano Bldg. (Basilan Theater) in the background

=== Philippine Republic ===
When the town of Zamboanga became a chartered city in 1936, it included Basilan. On July 1, 1948, by virtue of a bill filed by then-Congressman Juan S. Alano, Basilan itself became a separate city after Republic Act. No. 288 was passed by the 1st Philippine Congress to separate the island from the Zamboanga mainland as a separate entity, which was justified owing to the distance between the island and the city of Zamboanga.

The first city mayor was Nicasio S. Valderroza, appointed by President Elpidio Quirino. He was considered a builder of cities, having been variously a Provincial Treasurer, an acting Provincial Governor of the old Province of Zamboanga, Mayor of Baguio, first Mayor of Zamboanga City, First Mayor of Davao City and the first appointed Mayor of the new City of Basilan.

When President Ramon Magsaysay became president of the Republic in 1954, he appointed Leroy S. Brown as mayor of Basilan City. He served as the second and the last appointive mayor of this city until December 31, 1955. The city was then classified as a first class city.

With the approval of Republic Act. No. 1211 amending the charter of the City of Basilan, the position of the City Mayor became elective.

The first election for local officials in Basilan was held on November 8, 1955. Mayor Brown was overwhelmingly elected as the first elective mayor of the city, serving for 5 terms. The then Isabela district, being the city center, was the site for many city public works projects that gave way to an era of economic growth.

He was the first and the last elected city executive of Basilan. He served uninterrupted from January 1954 to December 31, 1975, under the Administrations of Presidents Carlos P. Garcia, Diosdado Macapagal and Ferdinand Marcos. During his term, the city council gave birth to a new breed of legislators and leaders from 1954 to 1975. These years have since been called Basilan's "Golden Years".

=== Municipality of Isabela ===
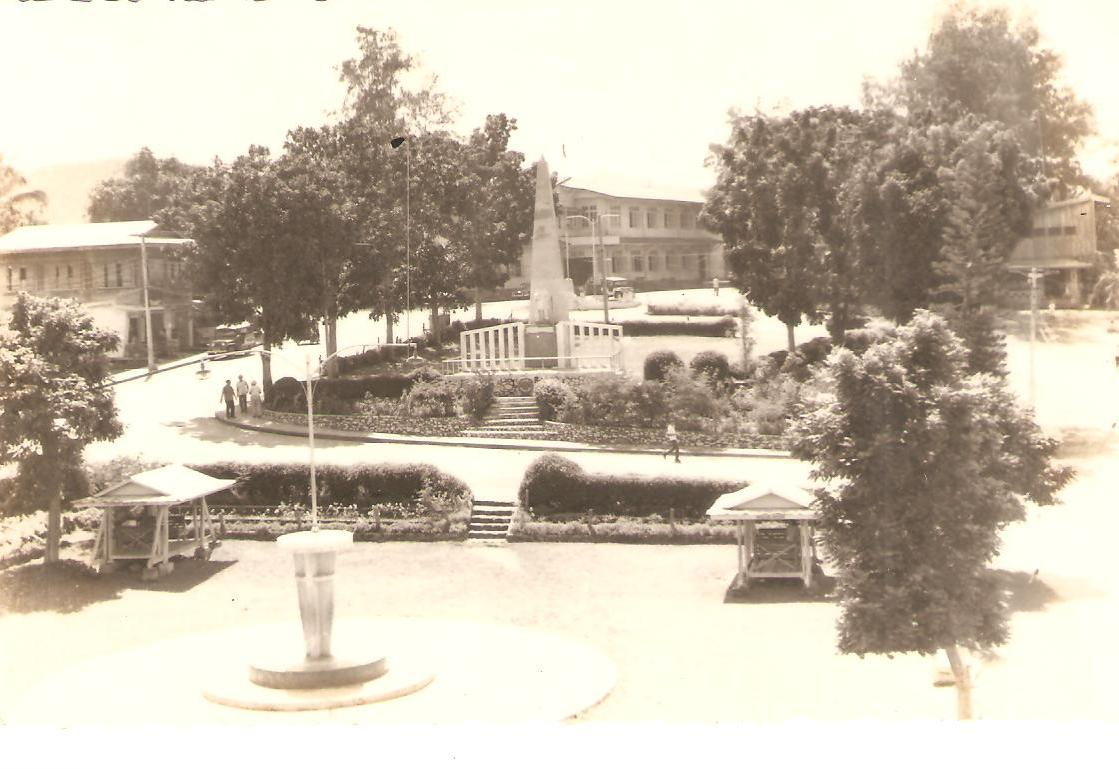
Old Plaza Rizal and Plaza Misericordia, opposite Santa Isabel Cathedral, old City Hall (Provincial Capitol) atop the hill at the background

On September 21, 1972, President Ferdinand Marcos declared martial law in the country. At that time, Basilan was in the middle of the Moro National Liberation Front Uprising prompted by the expose of the Jabidah Massacre on March 18, 1968. A number of native Moro leaders joined the MNLF rebellion, making Basilan a veritable warzone. The first-ever armed confrontation occurred around the heavily forested hills of Bagbagon and Canibungan in Lantawan on the island's western area. This was followed by the occupation of the Alano Plantation (declared "No Man's Land" by the military) by MNLF "munduhin" and "blackshirts" and the ensuing aerial bombardment by the military which left the plantation totally devastated. MNLF rebels then laid siege over Lamitan's poblacion, but was eventually staved off by fierce resistance from Lamitan residents who volunteered to fight valiantly beside elements of the Armed Forces and the Philippine Constabulary.

Several more raids and ambushes were made throughout the island, which succeeded in stopping all the operations of the plantations. Sporadic gun-battles, too, broke out within Isabela's poblacion, and pirate raids harried fishing operations as well as passenger ferry traffic between Basilan and Zamboanga.

After more than two years of incessant fighting, a substantial number among Basilan's Christian populace left the place altogether reducing the Christian tribes to minority status once again. After nearly 50 years of continuous immigration from Zamboanga, the Visayas and Luzon, Basilan experienced, for the very first time, a net outflow of people.

On December 27, 1973, President Marcos issued Presidential Decree No. 356, converting the City of Basilan into the Province of Basilan "to provide the close government attention and for the purpose of spurring its growth". Another Presidential Decree numbered 593 dated December 2, 1974, amended P.D. 356. The law not only defines the city's territory but also provided that the capital of Basilan shall be the Municipality of Isabela. It also created ten Municipalities to comprise the new Province of Basilan.

Presidential Decree No. 593 was later amended by Presidential Decree No. 840 dated December 11, 1975, reducing the number of municipalities to seven in order to render its " territorial portion more complementary to the size of the area and more responsive to pacification, rehabilitation and total development of the province". The municipalities specified in the said amendment were the following: Isabela, Lamitan, Tuburan, Tipo-Tipo, Sumisip, Maluso and Lantawan, of which five municipalities are now in existence. It also provided for the absorption of the territorial jurisdiction of the City of Basilan into the Municipality of Isabela with its poblacion as the capital seat of the province.

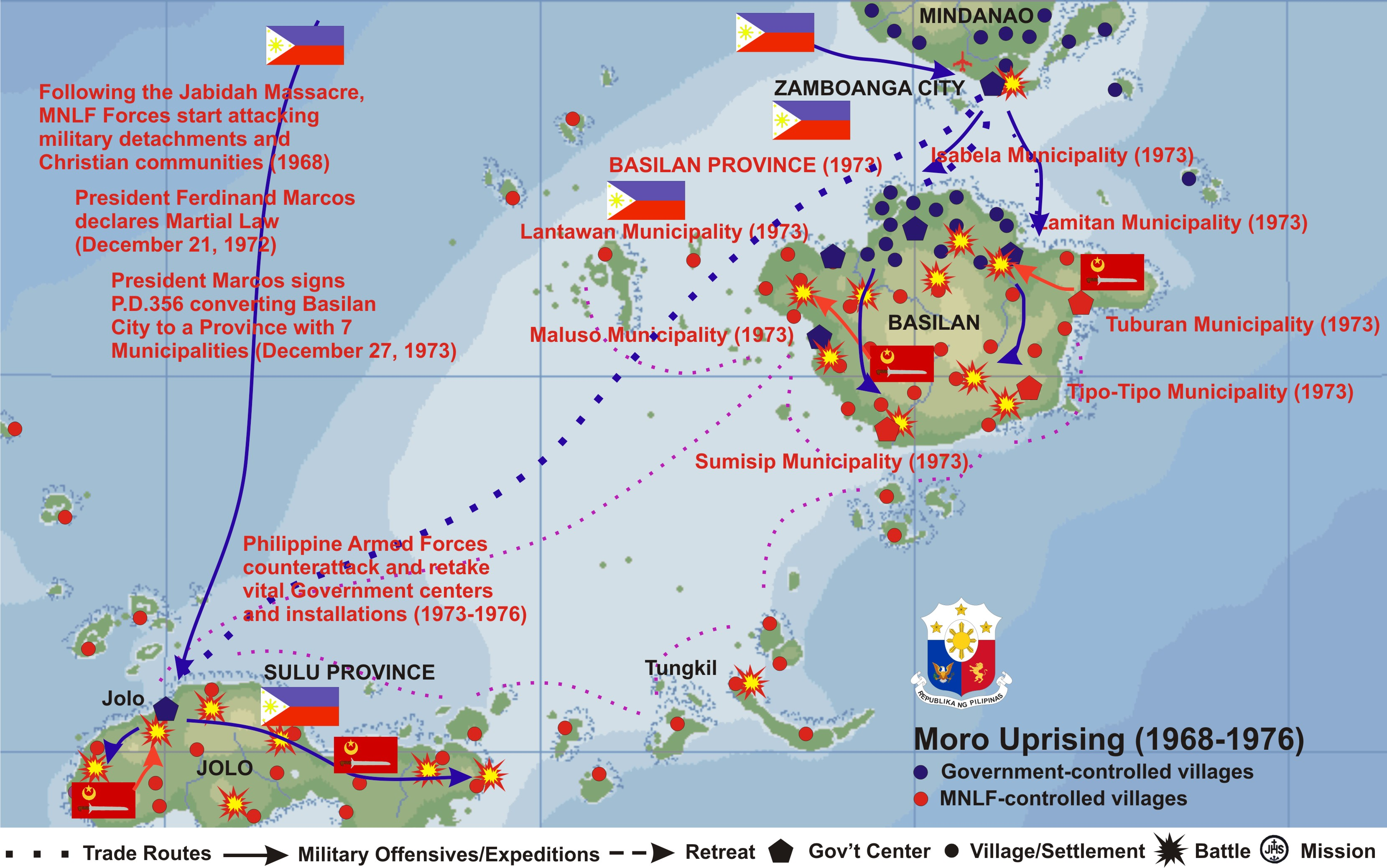
Moro Uprising and martial law in Basilan 1968–1976

The conversion into a province, and the creation of municipalities ensured that Basilan's sparsely populated areas were "given" to Muslim warlords and surrendering MNLF Commanders by Presidential fiat, as a form of bounty or reward for laying down their arms. The once-progressive First-Class City of Basilan was emasculated beyond recognition, having been reduced to an area exactly One-Kilometer radius within the Isabela Poblacion.

Under martial law, Basilan's first military governor was Col. Tomas G. Nanquil Jr., then serving as commander of the 24th Infantry Brigade stationed in the province. During his tenure, he was assisted by three vice governors and served for approximately one and a half years.

Before Basilan was converted to a province, it had three regular municipalities, Isabela, Lamitan, and Maluso which are districts of the city of Basilan. Even when Col. Nanquil was appointed Military Governor, the city of Basilan was still functioning under Mayor Brown until December 31, 1975, due to its territorial boundary dispute with the Province of Basilan.

The second military Governor was Rear Admiral Romulo M. Espaldon. Due to his numerous functions and responsibilities as Commanding General of the Armed Forces of the Philippines' Southern Command (SouthCom), South Sulu Sea Frontiers Command, overall military supervisor of Mindanao, Deputy Chief of Staff of the AFP and Regional Commissioner for Islamic Affairs in Region IX, Adm. Espaldon could not possibly attend to his duties as Military Governor of Basilan. To this effect, he designated Col. Florencio Magsino, Brigade Commander of the 21st Infantry Brigade as Military Supervisor for Basilan and Officer-In-Charge. His Deputy Brigade Commander Col. Recaredo Calvo ably assisted Col. Magsino. When Col. Magsino was appointed Superintendent of the Philippine Military Academy (PMA) in Baguio and Col. Calvo was recalled to Headquarters, Col. Alfredo Rillera assumed command of the Brigade and became the Military Supervisor of Basilan. He was succeeded by Col. Salvador Mison. Col. Augusto Narag Jr., later replaced him. The last military Supervisor was Gen. Rodolfo Tolentino, consequently, the first military with a star rank to be appointed Military Supervisor in Basilan. Admiral Espaldon was the last military governor of the province, his term lasted until December 31, 1975.

On December 11, 1975, President Marcos appointed then Vice Governor for Administration Asan G. Camlian, a thrice-elected City Councilor, which later led to the appointment of Ricardo G. Mon as the first municipal mayor of now reinstated municipal government of Isabela. On New Year's Day 1976, Isabela, therefore, regained independence as the capital town of Basilan province.

==== City of Isabela ====
By virtue of Republic Act No. 9023 Isabela was granted cityhood, with said grant having been ratified by Isabela's residents on a plebiscite held April 25, 2001. Isabela's first city mayor then was Luis Rubio Biel II, the sitting municipal mayor elected in 1998.

In November of the same year, Isabela City's residents roundly rejected inclusion into the expanded Autonomous Region in Muslim Mindanao (ARMM), and have since remained under the administrative jurisdiction of the Zamboanga Peninsula region. The rest of Basilan's six municipalities were promptly inducted into the ARMM.

The elevation of Isabela to 4th-class city status gave the local government a much-needed boost, efficiently delivered under the Biel administration, revitalized Isabela City, making it an engine of growth for Basilan province even as the hinterlands was wracked by incessant firefights and gun-battles between the military and bandit groups such as the Abu Sayyaf and Moro Islamic Liberation Front (MILF).

This renewed vigor was cut-short when Biel was assassinated at high noon on March 3, 2006, by a lone gunman as he was about to leave City Hall. Isabela City residents mourned the loss of the slain Mayor in what probably is the biggest funeral procession ever seen in Basilan.

Isabela City then came under the short-lived administration of Vice Mayor Rodolfo Y. Tan, who served the remainder of Biel's term, relinquishing his post after having been defeated in the May 2007 local elections.

From June 2007 – 2016, Isabela City has been under the administration of Cherrylyn Santos-Akbar, who at 32 years, is one of the youngest Mayors of Isabela, and is the first woman to hold the post. She is one of the widows of slain Congressman Wahab Akbar, a 3-term Governor of Basilan. Akbar's first-wife was the incumbent Governor, while then-Mayor Akbar (now vice mayor) is the late strongman's second-wife.

Isabela City under then-Mayor Akbar figured prominently in the Anti-MOA/AD movement which was cobbled up in August 2008, when the Philippine Government Peace Negotiating Panel and the MILF was about to sign a landmark deal which would have granted the MILF a "separate, distinct and exclusive" Ancestral Domain and a semi-independent government, dubbed the Bangsamoro Juridical Entity (BJE). Indignation rallies in the Cities of Zamboanga and Iligan, as well as elsewhere in Mindanao were joined by protest actions staged by Isabela City residents, rejecting the proposed deal with the MILF.

In 2017, the capital was transferred from Isabela to Lamitan. Isabela still remains part of Basilan provincial services but regional services remain in Zamboanga Peninsula instead of ARMM where the province of Basilan belongs.

In 2019, Isabela's residents rejected their city's inclusion in the proposed Bangsamoro Autonomous Region during the plebiscite held on January 21.

== Geography ==
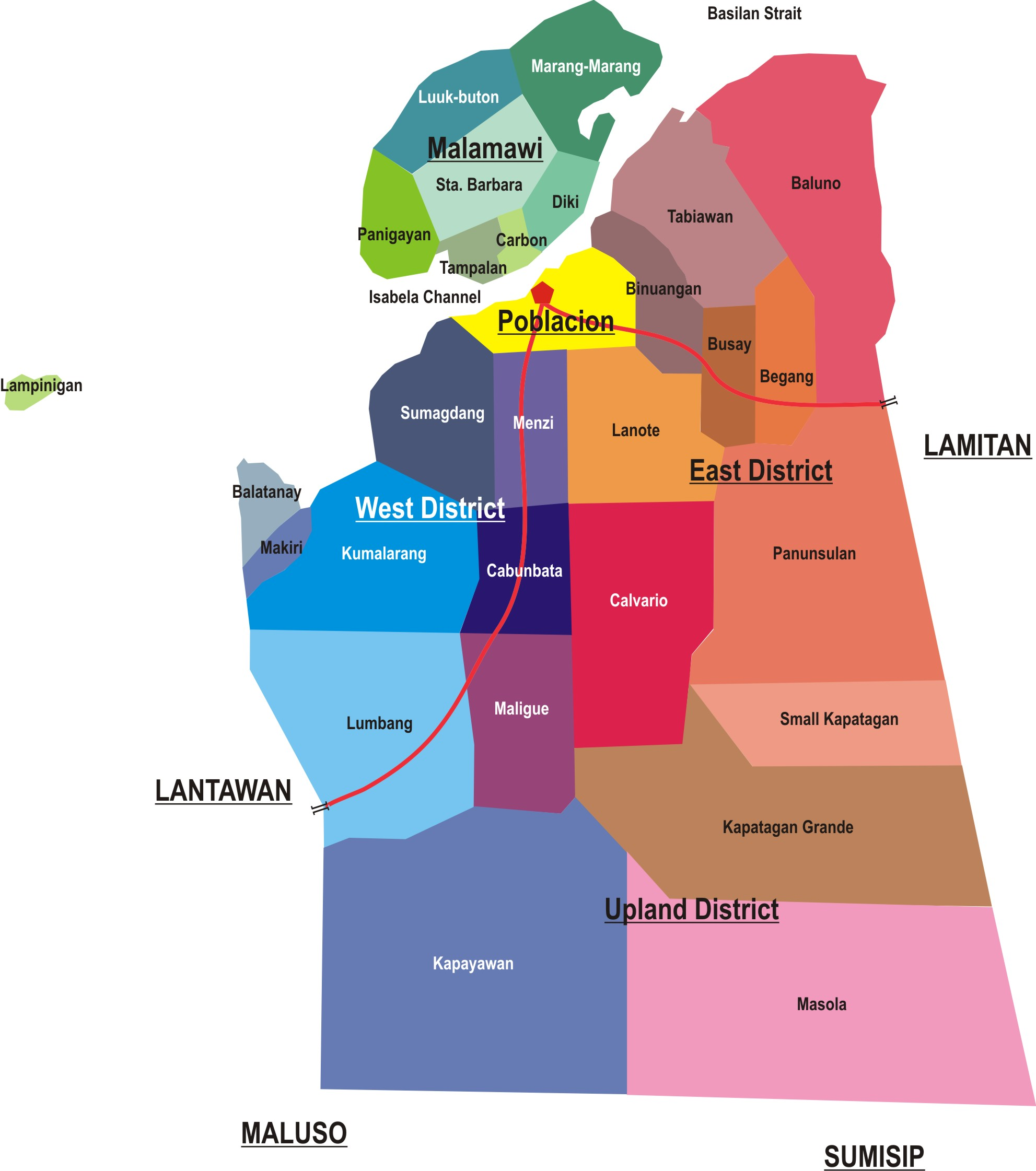
Map of Isabela City

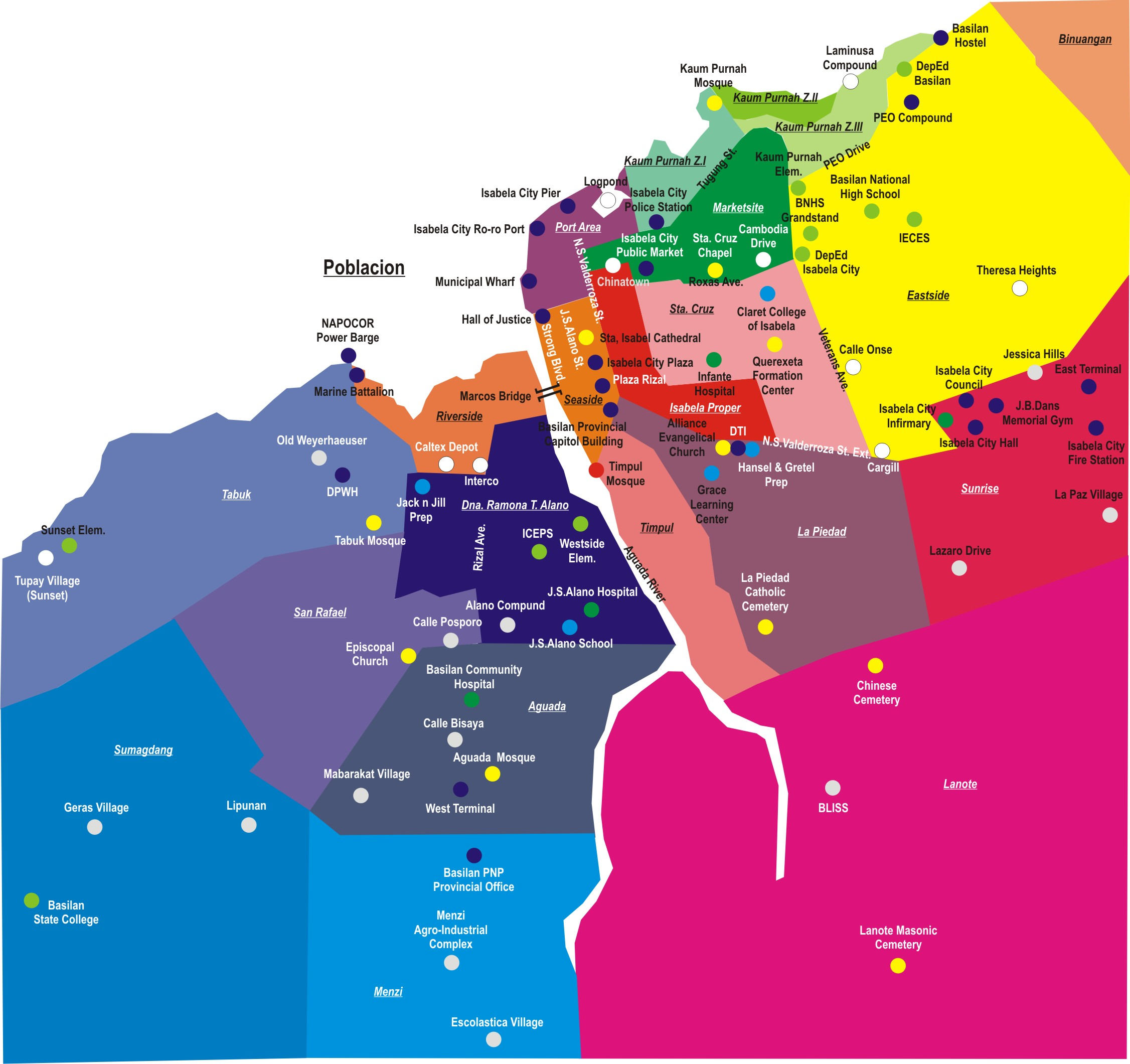
Isabela City Poblacion (urban area)

Isabela City is located on the northern shore of Basilan Island, along the Basilan Strait across from Zamboanga City to the north. Its territory under jurisdiction includes Malamawi Island.

The topography of the whole area of Isabela is an irregular, rolling terrain. The steepest grades of over 60% are found in some parts of the barangays of Menzi, Busay, Panunsulan, Calvario, Kapayawan and Kapatagan on the main island of Basilan and in the barangays of Panigayan and Santa Barbara on the offshore Malamawi Island.

=== Barangays ===
Isabela City is politically subdivided into 45 barangays. Each barangay consists of puroks while some have sitios.

Poblacion barangays are in bold.

- **Aguada**
- Balatanay
- Baluno
- Begang
- Binuangan
- Busay
- Cabunbata
- Calvario
- Carbon
- Diki
- **Isabela Eastside**
- **Isabela Proper**
- **Dona Ramona T. Alano**
- Kapatagan Grande
- **Kaumpurnah Zone I**
- **Kaumpurnah Zone II**
- **Kaumpurnah Zone III**
- Kapayawan
- Kumalarang
- **La Piedad**
- Lampinigan
- Lanote
- Lukbuton
- Lumbang
- Makiri
- Maligue
- Marang-marang
- **Marketsite**
- Masula
- Menzi
- Panigayan
- Panunsulan
- **Port Area**
- **Riverside**
- **San Rafael**
- Santa Barbara
- **Santa Cruz**
- **Seaside**
- Small Kapatagan
- Sumagdang
- Sunrise Village
- Tabiawan
- **Tabuk**
- Tampalan
- **Timpul**

=== Climate ===
Climate data for Isabela City
Month	Jan	Feb	Mar	Apr	May	Jun	Jul	Aug	Sep	Oct	Nov	Dec	Year
Record high °C (°F)	39 (102)	38 (100)	37 (99)	41 (106)	37 (99)	42 (108)	40 (104)	38 (100)	41 (106)	37 (99)	37 (99)	38 (100)	42 (108)
Mean daily maximum °C (°F)	28 (82)	27 (81)	27 (81)	28 (82)	28 (82)	28 (82)	28 (82)	27 (81)	28 (82)	27 (81)	27 (81)	27 (81)	27 (81)
Mean daily minimum °C (°F)	24 (75)	23 (73)	23 (73)	24 (75)	24 (75)	25 (77)	24 (75)	24 (75)	24 (75)	24 (75)	24 (75)	23 (73)	23 (73)
Record low °C (°F)	17 (63)	17 (63)	20 (68)	13 (55)	21 (70)	20 (68)	17 (63)	21 (70)	15 (59)	17 (63)	21 (70)	20 (68)	15 (59)
Average precipitation cm (inches)	4 (1.6)	5 (2.0)	4 (1.6)	5 (2.0)	9 (3.5)	12 (4.7)	13 (5.1)	12 (4.7)	13 (5.1)	16 (6.3)	11 (4.3)	8 (3.1)	119 (47)
Source: Weatherbase (modeled/calculated data, not measured locally)

Based on the Modified Coronas Climate Classification Scheme by the Philippine Atmospheric Geophysical and Astronomical Service Administration (PAGASA), Isabela City is classified under Type III zone, in which there are no pronounced maximum rain periods with short dry season lasting from 1 to 3 months.

== Demographics ==
Population census of Isabela
Year	Pop.	±% p.a.
1903	4,480	—
1918	23,089	+11.55%
1939	57,561	+4.45%
1948	110,297	+7.49%
1960	32,609	−9.65%
1970	34,878	+0.67%
1975	48,092	+6.65%
1980	49,891	+0.74%
1990	59,078	+1.70%
1995	68,557	+2.83%
2000	73,032	+1.36%
2007	87,985	+2.60%
2010	97,857	+3.95%
2015	112,788	+2.74%
2020	130,379	+3.10%
2024	151,297	+3.64%
Source: Philippine Statistics Authority

According to the 2020 census, Isabela City has a population of 130,379 people.

Isabela is home to a diverse community of inhabitants: Chavacanos, Tausugs, and Yakans have sizeable presence in the city. Also residing in the city are the Sama, the migrant Maranaos, Ilocanos, Hiligaynons, Cebuanos, and to a much lesser extent, the Han Chinese and South Asians.

The once sizeable expatriate population of Swiss, Swedes, Germans, Spanish, British and Americans dwindled towards the end of the 1960s when the Moro rebellion started razing the plantations, and in so doing demoting Basilan from its erstwhile 1st class city status in the early to mid-1960s to a 5th class province by the late 1970s.

Numerous languages are spoken in the city. Chavacano is primarily the native language of most of the Christian inhabitants and serves as the city's lingua franca. Also spoken are Tausug, Cebuano, and Yakan. Smaller minority languages include Sama, Maranao, Ilocano and Hiligaynon. Tagalog and English are also widely used throughout the city by all groups of peoples and as the languages of business, education, and administration.

=== Religion ===
According to the statistics from the Philippine Statistics Authority (PSA) on 2020, 86,672 or 66.60% of the people of Isabela are adherent of Islam and mainly belong to the Sunni branch. Adherents of Islam are mainly of the Tausug and Yakan people. Christianity (mostly Roman Catholicism which makes up 41,855 or 22.16%) has a large adherence to in the city and is followed by most of the Chavacano and Bisayans of the city. The remaining proportion of the population are adherent of other belief such as folk religion and other sects.

== Economy ==
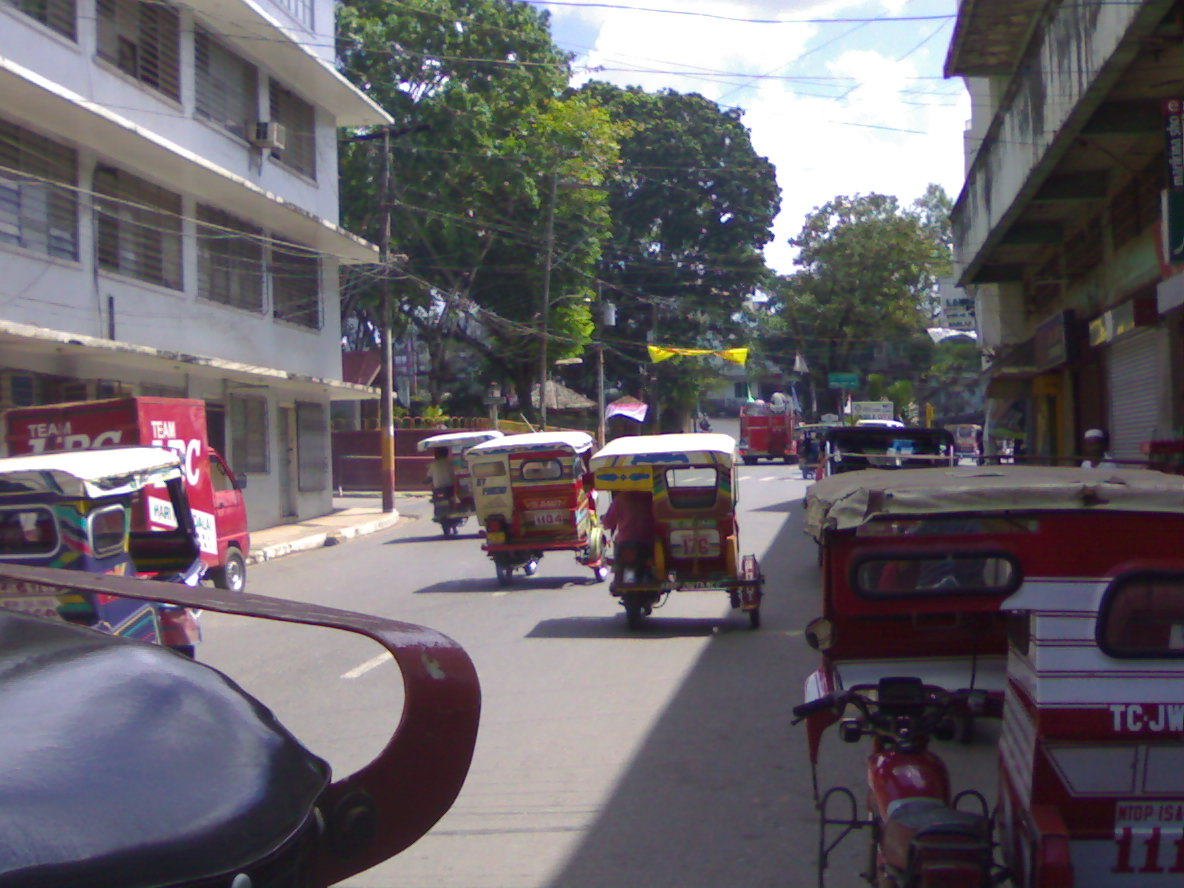
Downtown Isabela City, J. S. Alano Street, flanked by Santa Isabel Cathedral and Isabela City Plaza (left) and major commercial establishments and banks (right)

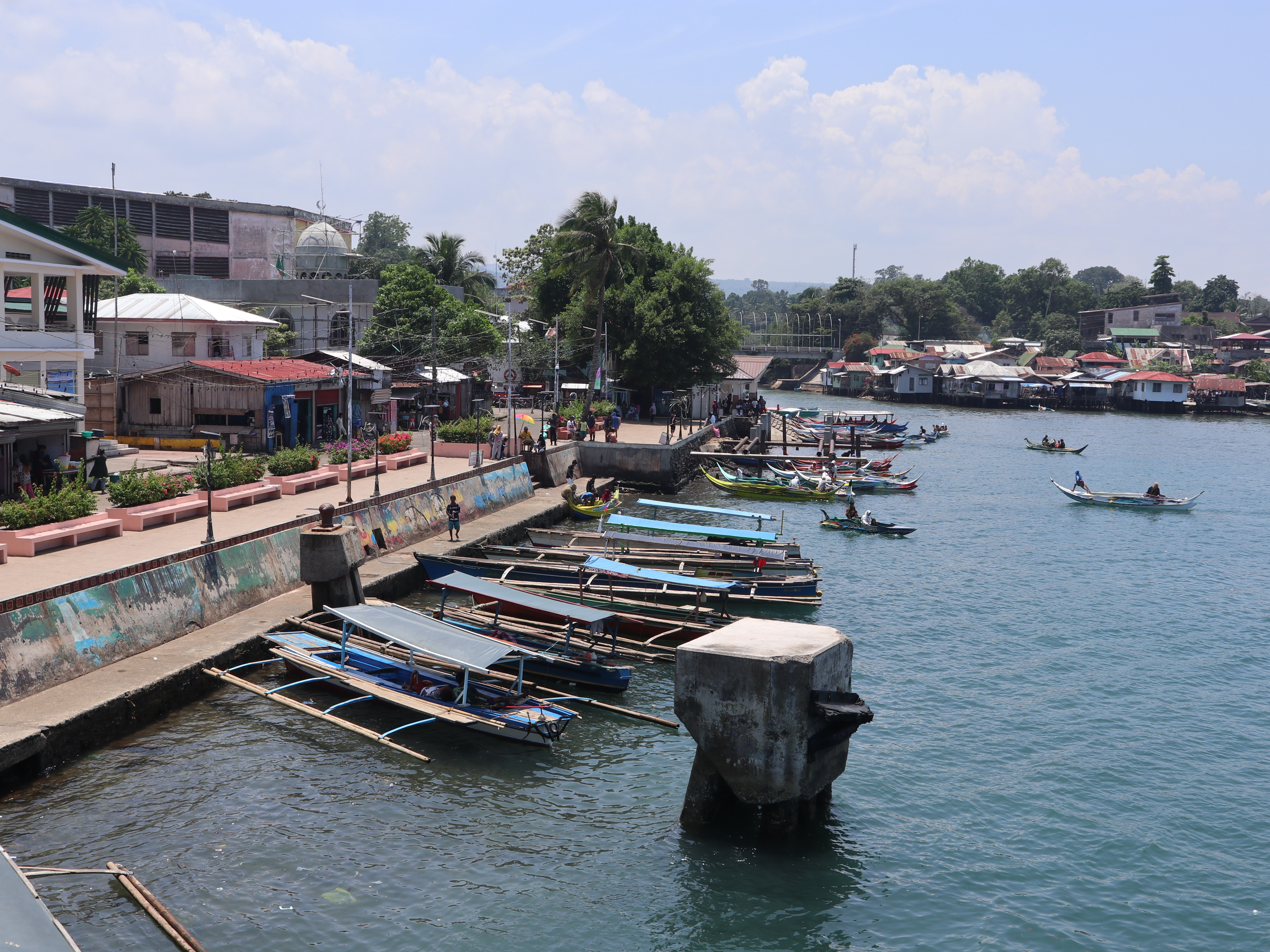
Isabela riverside

Poverty Incidence of Isabela

Source: Philippine Statistics Authority

- Isabela City's business sector is represented by the Basilan Chamber of Commerce and Industry, Inc., established in 1975.
- Nearly 90% of the agriculturally productive land area is owned by Isabela City residents.
- Almost all trading activities are handled by the resident Chinese community, who has a significant presence in the professions as well.
- Zamboangueños are mostly working either as professionals or as City Government employees
- Tausugs/Maranaos are engaged primarily in retail commerce, vending and fishing
- Bisayas are into micro-small enterprises and rural farming
- Yakans are mostly copra dealers, traders, or Provincial Government employees
- the Department of Trade and Industry Isabela City Office is located at the Isabela City Hall Complex, Sunrise Barangay

Primary economic enterprises:

- Baluno and Menzi are two barangays that produce agricultural products, primarily rubber. They have their own rubber processing plants from the raw rubber sap, and sell these products to merchants for export. Also, these rubber processing cooperatives contribute much to Isabela City's employment rate.
- Isabela City's OTOP (One Town One Product) showcase is: crumb rubber, owing to the number of rubber processing plants located within City limits.
- BF Goodrich and Sime Darby Tires are the major international investments in the city.
- Other Major Economic Activities include coconut/copra production and, to a lesser extent, bamboo crafts/furnitures

== Infrastructure ==
=== Transportation ===
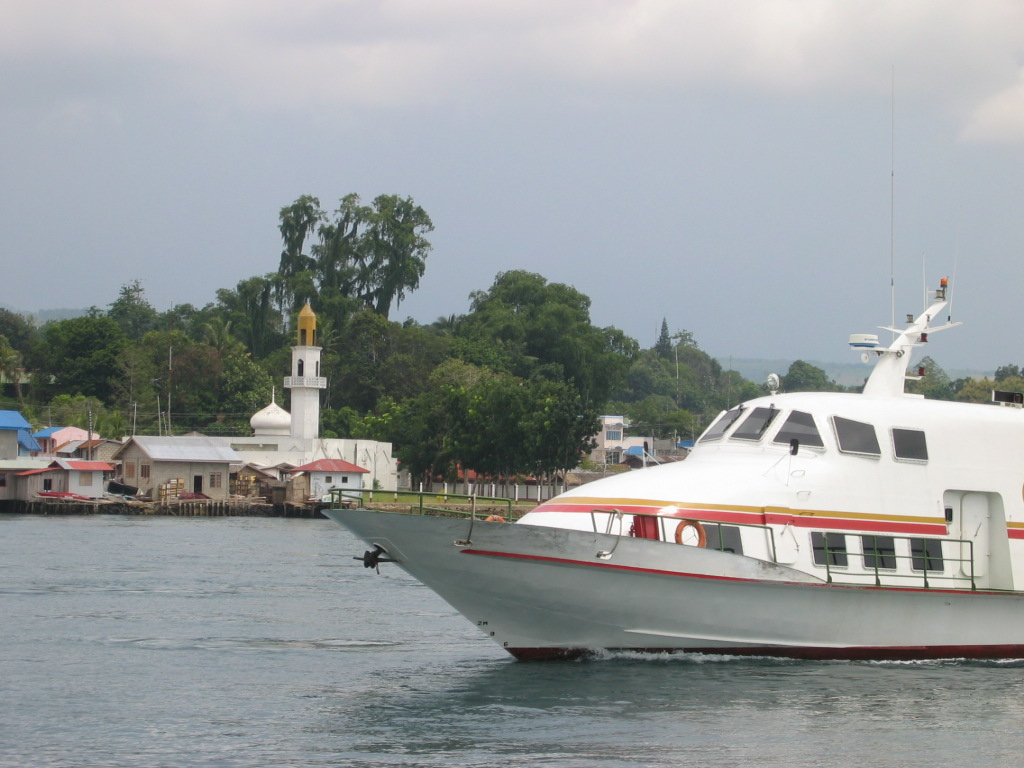
Ferry in Isabela from Zamboanga City

By sea: Isabela is accessible by sea, through several sea ferries plying the busy Isabela - Zamboanga City route

- Aleson Shipping Lines - operators of M/V Stephanie Marie 1 and 2, M/V Ciara Joie and M/V Sea Jet
- SRN Fast Seacrafts - operators of Weesam Express 2 and Weesam Express 8
- Montenegro Shipping Lines Inc. - operators of Reina Kleopatra, Reina Banderada and Reina Justisya

Ferries leave on an average of 30-minute intervals.

By land:

- Isabela is served by the D'Biel La Virgen Milagrosa Transportation Co. whose buses ply the Isabela-Lamitan route
- a number of franchised vans also ply the Isabela-Lamitan, Isabela-Maluso routes
- Isabela City public relies on Motorized Tricycles to travese around the city which can fit up to 5 passengers. They can be use as taxis or ride in specific routes.

=== Sports and entertainment venues ===
- D'Biel Bowling Center, located in Sunrise Barangay
- RAFCER Entertainment Complex - disco, videoke, bowling, located in Menzi Barangay (Permanently closed)
- 3 Tennis Courts (Basilan Tennis Club at Tabuk, Basilan PNP Tennis Club and Menzi Tennis Club both in Menzi Barangay)
- Badminton games are played nightly at the Isabela City Gym
- Volleyball courts at the BNHS Grandstand and J.S.Alano Compound
- a number of Videoke Bars and Restaurants are open until 2 a.m.
- a number of internet cafes and online gaming stations likewise dot the city

=== Healthcare ===
- Juan S. Alano Memorial Hospital (formerly Basilan Hospital, the first private hospital on Basilan island)
- Infante Hospital Management Corporation
- Basilan Community Hospital, Inc.
- Basilan General Hospital (government-run facility)

Health centers and pharmacies:

- Nearly all Barangays have newly built health centers staffed by competent Barangay Health Workers
- Numerous pharmacies dot the Isabela City poblacion

=== Security ===
Isabela City hosted the Balikatan 02-1 Exercises between the Philippine Military and U. S. Armed Forces in 2002, and then again in 2005.

Police:

- Isabela City Police Station - located at Marketsite Barangay, alongside the BJMP - Isabela City Jail
- Philippine National Police - Basilan Police Provincial Office - located in Menzi Barangay

Armed forces:

- Army 15th Special Forces Airborne Company - located at Barangay Tabuk
- Army Special Operation Task Force Basilan - located at Barangay Tabiawan
- Army 4th Special Forces BN (RIVERINE) - located at Barangay Cabunbata

== Education ==
=== Public ===
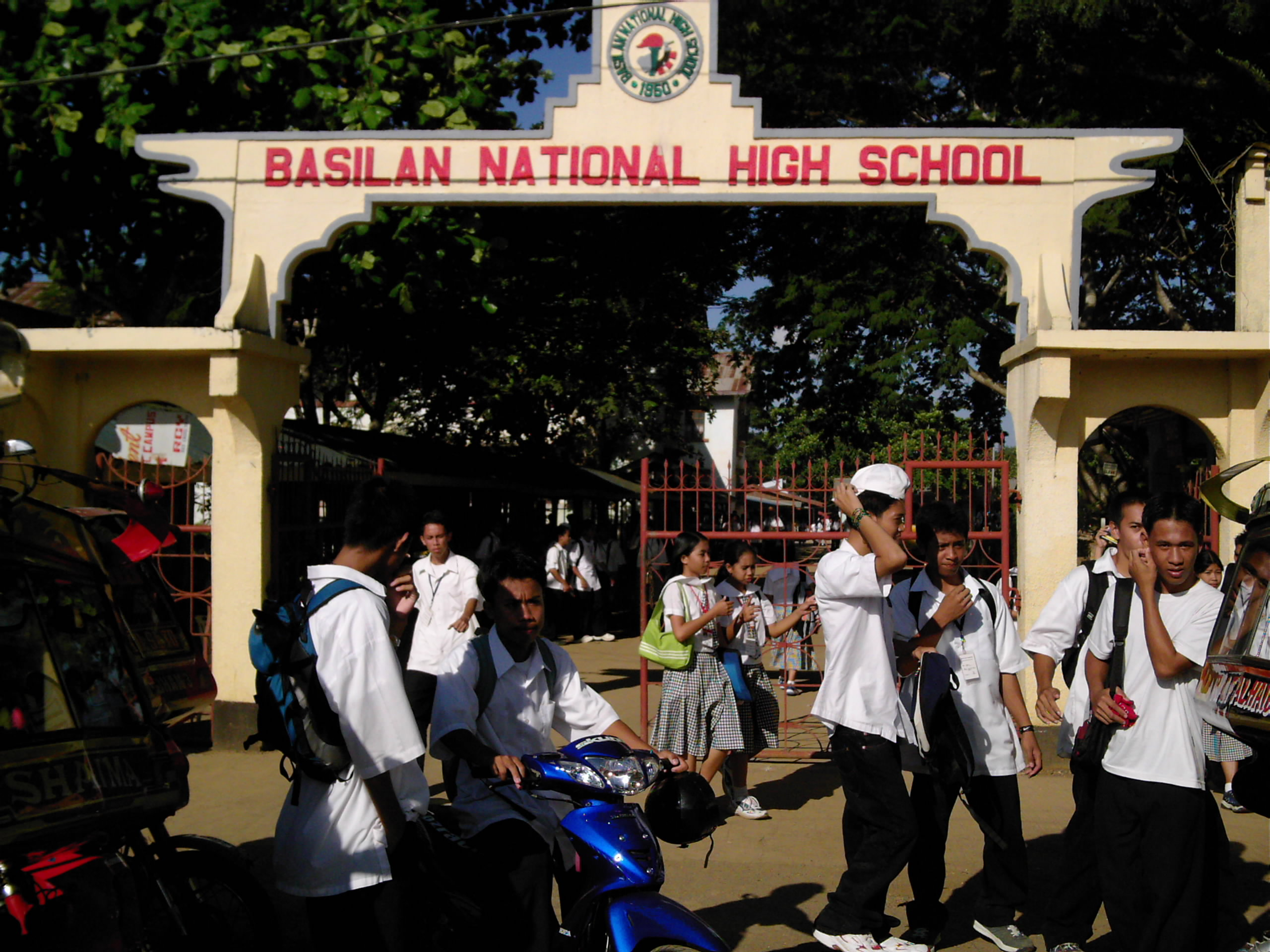
Basilan National High School, premier secondary school of Isabela City and Basilan

- Basilan State University - located at Barangay Sumagdang, offers the biggest number of courses among tertiary institutions in the City
- All public high schools and elementary schools are administered by the City Schools Division of Isabela, DepEd Zamboanga Peninsula
- Basilan National High School - the premier secondary educational institution in the Province

=== Private ===
- Claret College of Isabela - formerly Fatima School, the only Catholic-run sectarian school in the city, located at Barangay Santa Cruz, also has a High School and Elementary Department
- Computer Technologies Institute (COMTECH) Inc. - located at Barangay Port Area with its main campus in Zamboanga City, offers an IT flagship program in BS Information Systems, Diploma in HRM, Computer operations Programming, Computer Engineering Technician, Computer Secretarial Management and 8 Tesda Qualifications for National Certificates.
- Furigay Colleges Inc., - located at Rizal Avenue, Barangay Doña Ramona T. Alano Which offers HRM and BSN are few to mention.
- Juan S. Alano Memorial School, Inc. - affiliated with the Juan S. Alano Memorial Hospital, Inc., offers Midwifery and related health science courses, located at Dona Ramona T. Alano Barangay
- Jack n Jill Integrated School and Hansel and Gretel International School provide preparatory and Kindergarten learning for pre-school toddlers, with the former offering Elementary grades up to the 6th-grade level
- An unspecified number of Sunday schools for Christian children and madaris (madrassah) for Muslim learners are also operating within city limits
