= Yakan people =

Indigenous Filipino ethnolinguistic group

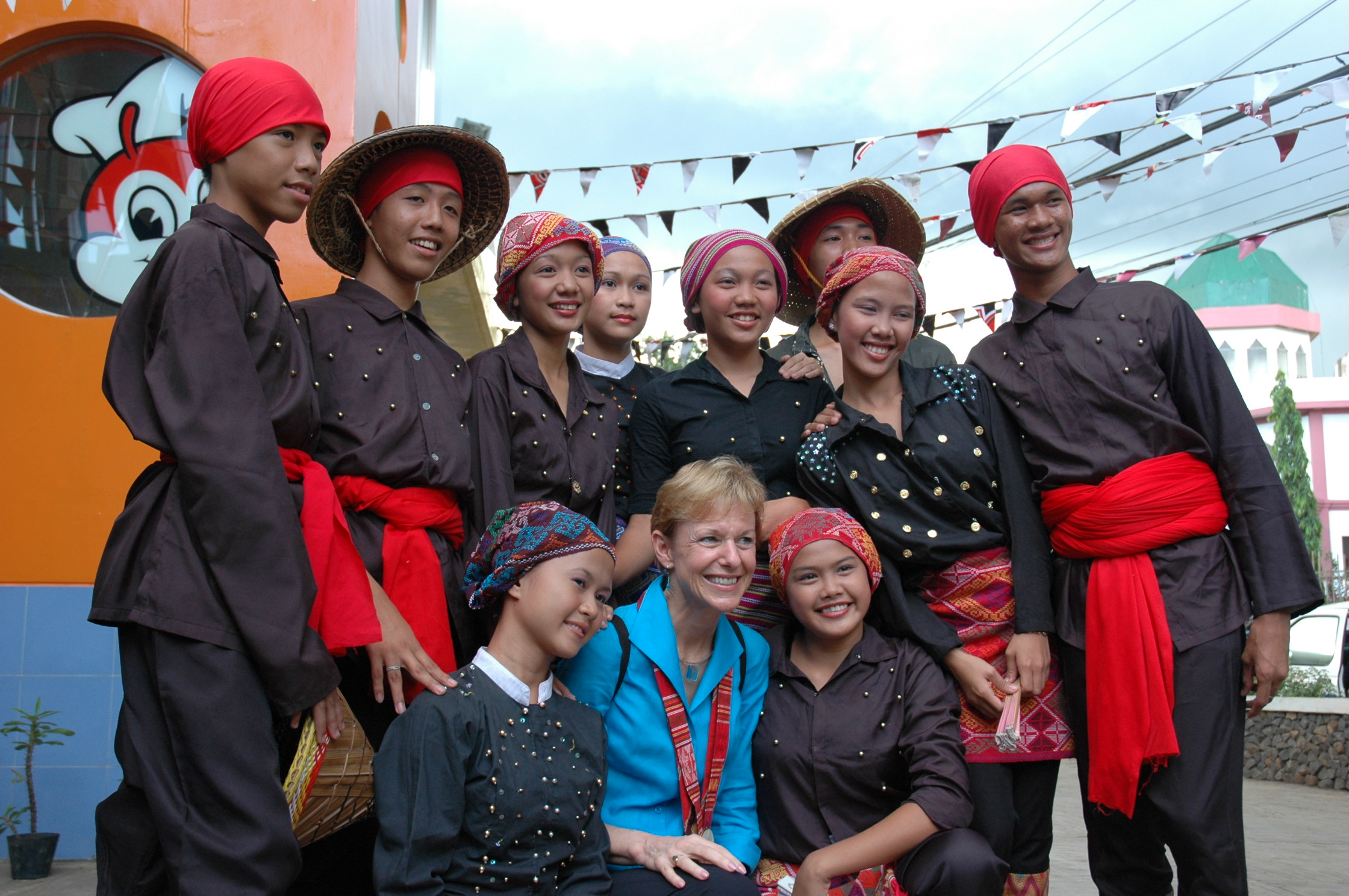
- Students from the Datu Bantilan Dance Troupe in traditional Yakan costume with US Ambassador Kristie Kenney.

Total population
- 282,715 (2020 census)

Regions with significant populations
- Philippines: (Basilan, Zamboanga Peninsula)

Languages
- Native; Yakan; Also; Tausug • Chavacano (Basileño and Zamboangueño dialects) • Cebuano • Filipino • English

Religion
- Sunni Islam

Related ethnic groups
- Sama-Bajau, other Moro peoples, Lumad, Visayans, other Filipinos, other Austronesian peoples

The Yakan people are among the major Filipino ethnolinguistic groups in the Sulu Archipelago. Having a significant number of followers of Islam, it is considered one of the 13 Muslim groups in the Philippines. The Yakans mainly reside in Basilan but are also in Zamboanga City. They speak a language known as Bissa Yakan, which has characteristics of both Sama-Bajau Sinama and Tausug (Jundam 1983: 7-8). It is written in Jawi, with adaptations to sounds not present in Arabic (Sherfan 1976).

The Yakan are an indigenous ethnolinguistic group primarily based in Basilan and parts of Zamboanga Peninsula (including Zamboanga City), known for their rich weaving traditions, distinctive horse culture, and strong communal values. Their identity developed through centuries of Basilan history, shaped by early island communities, regional trade, and contact with neighboring Southeast Asian societies.

Historical and ethnographic sources link the Yakan to early Basilan populations, particularly the Tagimaha, and to cultural influences from Champa (Cham / Orang Dampuan) through trade, settlement, and intercultural exchange. Over time, these connections contributed to the formation of a distinct Yakan identity, shaped by local heritage, foreign influence, and long-term adaptation to inland environments.

== History ==
=== Precolonial Foundations in Tagima (7th to 10th centuries) ===
The Yakan people of Basilan trace their ancestry to early precolonial communities centered on Tagima, the historical name of Basilan. Among these were the Tagimaha, a maritime-oriented society involved in regional trade across the Sulu Archipelago and the wider Malay world. By the 7th to 8th centuries, Basilan had become part of Southeast Asian trade networks linking Sulu, Borneo, and mainland Southeast Asia.

During this period, Cham (Orang Dampuan) traders from Champa maintained contact with Basilan and nearby regions through trade and settlement. Through commerce, migration, and intermarriage, Cham communities influenced Tagimaha society in areas such as maritime practices, weaving traditions, decorative styles, and social organization. These interactions contributed to the development of Tagimaha culture through a combination of indigenous Basilan traditions and Cham influence.

=== Early Islamization and Cham and Tagimaha Religious Influence (10th to 13th centuries) ===
By the 10th century, Cham merchants and Islamic scholars contributed to the early introduction of Islam among coastal and trading communities in Basilan and parts of Sulu, at a time when much of Sulu still followed Hindu-Buddhist and indigenous religious traditions.

Historical sources indicate that some Tagimaha communities were among the earliest Muslim groups in the Philippine archipelago, adopting Islamic beliefs before the formal establishment of the Sulu Sultanate.

During the reign of the Samudera Pasai Sultanate, Muslim missionaries traveled to various parts of the region to spread Islam, eventually reaching the Sulu Archipelago. According to traditional accounts, the missionaries were not initially welcomed by the Buranun, who were among the indigenous inhabitants of Sulu. They subsequently traveled to Basilan, where they were received by the local population. The Tagimaha later embraced Islam, and some members of the community intermarried with the missionaries. These interactions contributed to the spread of Islam among the Tagimaha and surrounding communities.

Later Islamic missionaries such as Karimul Makdum traveled through Sulu to strengthen and teach Islam more formally. By this time, some Tagimaha settlers already had early knowledge of Islam through contact with Muslim merchants. Makdum’s mission helped expand and deepen Islamic practice in the region, contributing to the gradual spread of Islam across the Sulu Archipelago.

=== Tagimaha Expansion into Sulu and Regional Conflict (10th to 13th centuries) ===
As regional commerce expanded, Tagimaha groups extended into Buansa (Jolo), an emerging political and commercial center in the Sulu Archipelago. There, they encountered Buranun communities, leading to competition over territory, political authority, and trade networks. These tensions occurred within the broader context of conflicts involving Orang Dampuan (Cham migrants) and indigenous Sulu groups, shaping early political rivalries in the region.

Following these conflicts, some Tagimaha remained in Sulu and became part of the local ruling elite, while others returned to Basilan, withdrawing from contested coastal areas.

They resisted Tausug rule during the early formation of the Sulu Sultanate, eventually gaining recognition as a separate political entity that were not under the control of the Sulu Sultanate.

=== Shift from Maritime Trade to Inland Settlement (13th to 16th centuries) ===
Tagimaha groups who returned to Basilan gradually relocated from coastal settlements to the island’s interior, adapting to agriculture, forest-based livelihoods, and inland trade. This transition was influenced by declining maritime dominance, rising coastal insecurity, and increased competition in Sulu port centers. Over time, this shift transformed Tagimaha society from a primarily maritime trading culture into a more inland and agrarian-oriented community.

=== Emergence of the Yakan People and Dual Ancestral Roots (16th century onward) ===
Through centuries of migration, cultural continuity, and adaptation, descendants of the Tagimaha in Basilan developed a distinct identity recognized today as the Yakan people. Yakan culture preserves elements of Tagimaha heritage, including social organization, settlement patterns, and textile traditions, while also reflecting significant Champa (Cham / Orang Dampuan) influence in weaving techniques, decorative motifs, maritime trade traditions, early Islamic practices, and communal governance systems introduced through trade, migration, and intercultural exchange.

As a result, the Yakan trace their historical and cultural roots to a dual foundation: indigenous Tagimaha ancestry in Basilan and external Cham influence from Champa, shaped by trade, migration, Islamization, and long-term social integration across centuries.

The Yakans reside in the Sulu Archipelago, situated to the west of Zamboanga in Mindanao. Traditionally they wear colorful, handwoven clothes. The women wear tight fitting short blouses and both sexes wear narrowcut pants resembling breeches. The women covers it partly with a wrap-around material while the man wraps a sash-like cloth around the waist where he places his weapon – usually a long knife. Nowadays most Yakans wear western clothes and use their traditional clothes only for cultural festivals.

The Spaniards called the Yakan, "Sameacas" and considered them an aloof and sometimes hostile hill people (Wulff 1978:149; Haylaya 1980:13).

In the early 1970s, some of the Yakan settled in Zamboanga City due to political unrest that led to armed conflict between militant Muslim groups and government soldiers. The Yakan Village in Upper Calarian is famous among Filipino and foreign tourists because of their art of weaving. Traditionally, they have used plants such as pineapple and abaca converted into fibers as basic material for weaving. Using herbal extracts from leaves, roots and barks, the Yakans dyed the fibers and produced colorful combinations and intricate designs.

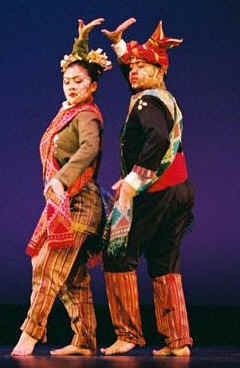
Filipino Americans portraying the traditional makeup and attire of a newlywed Yakan couple.

The Seputangan is the most intricate design worn by the women around their waist or as a head cloth. The Palipattang is patterned after the color of the rainbow while the bunga-sama, after the python. Almost every Yakan fabric can be described as unique since the finished materials are not exactly identical. Differences may be seen in the pattern or in the design or in the distribution of colors.

Contacts with settlers from Luzon, Visayas, and the American Peace Corps brought about changes in the art and style of weaving. Many resorted to using chemical dyes, which are more convenient, and started weaving table runners, placemats, wall decor, purses, and other items that are not present in a traditional Yakan house. In other words, Yakan communities, for economic reason, catered to the needs of their customers, demonstrating their trading acumen. New designs were introduced, such as kenna-kenna, patterned after a fish; dawen-dawen, after the leaf of a vine; pene mata-mata, after the shape of an eye or the kabang buddi, a diamond-shaped design.

Cebu Pacific introduced its QR Flight codes pattered after traditional weaving of bright hues and geometric designs of Zamboanga's Yakan textile to promote local tourism.

== Gallery of Yakan art ==
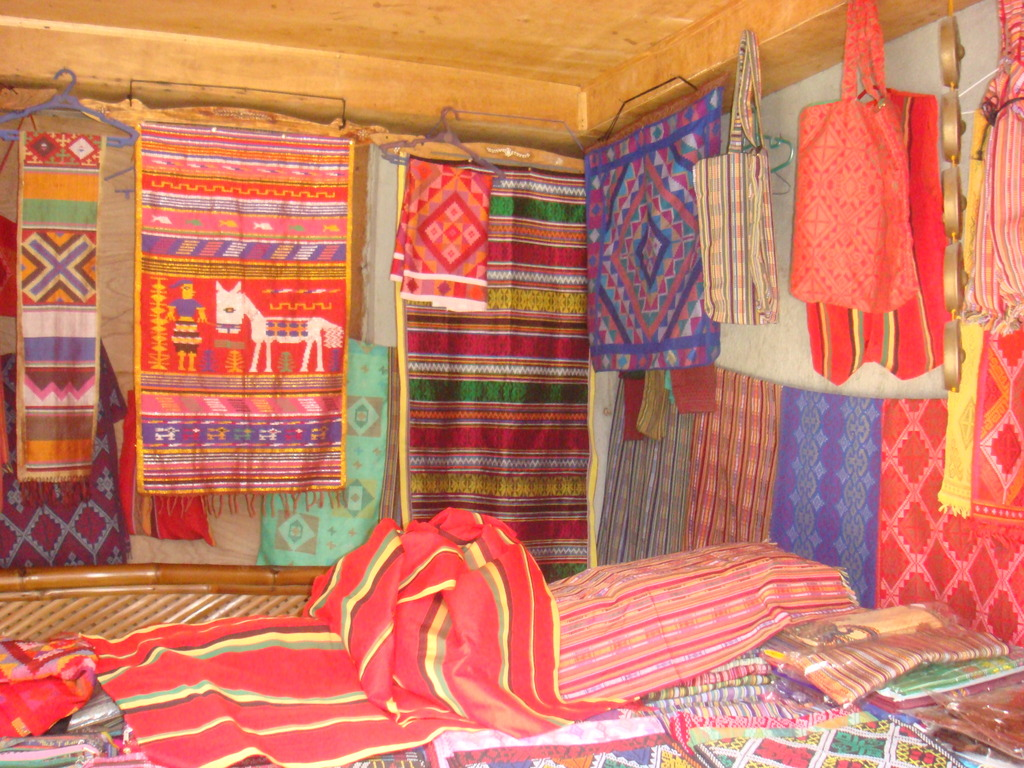
Yards of Yakan cloth on display

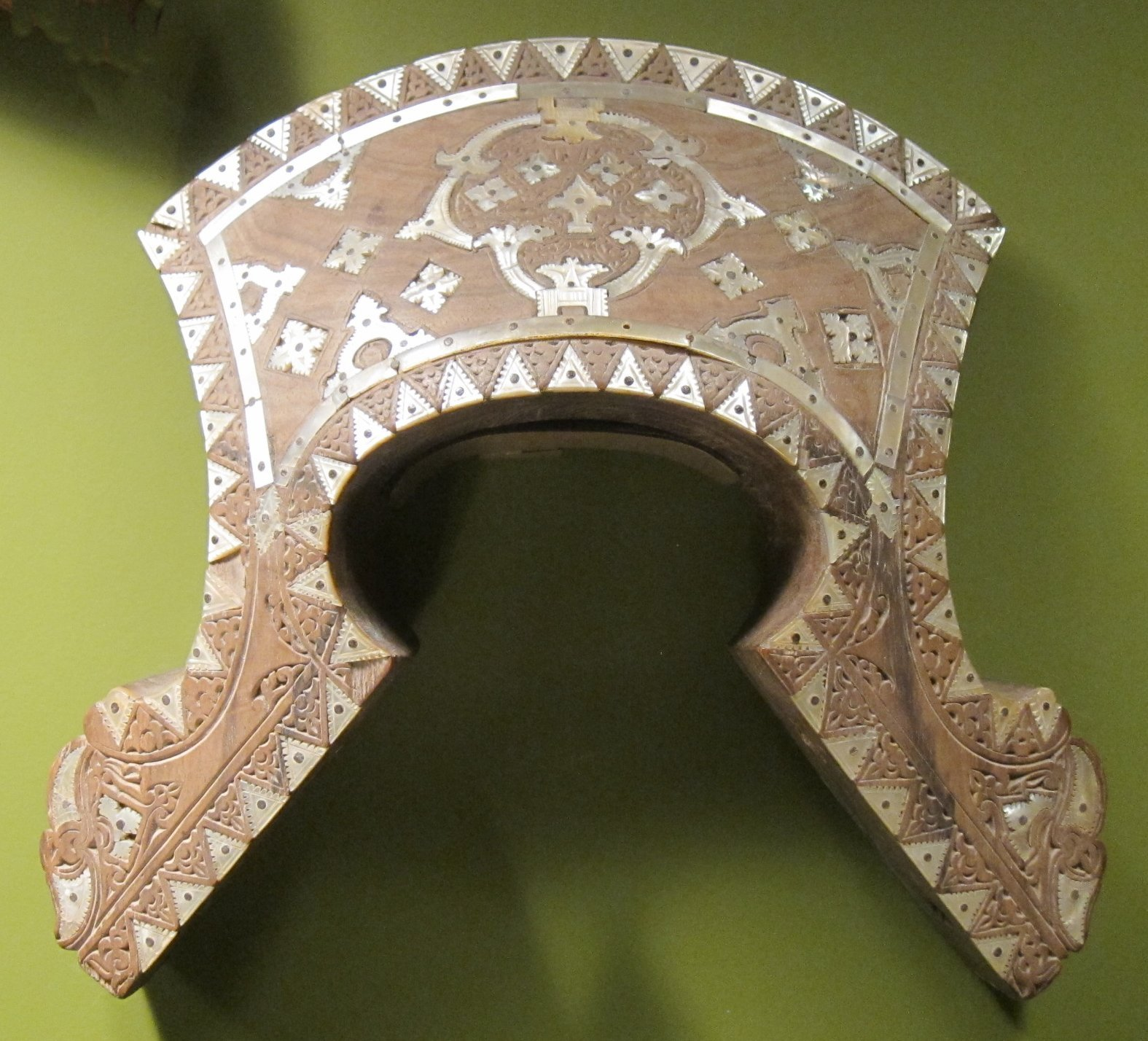
A saddle pommel made of wood with shell inlay

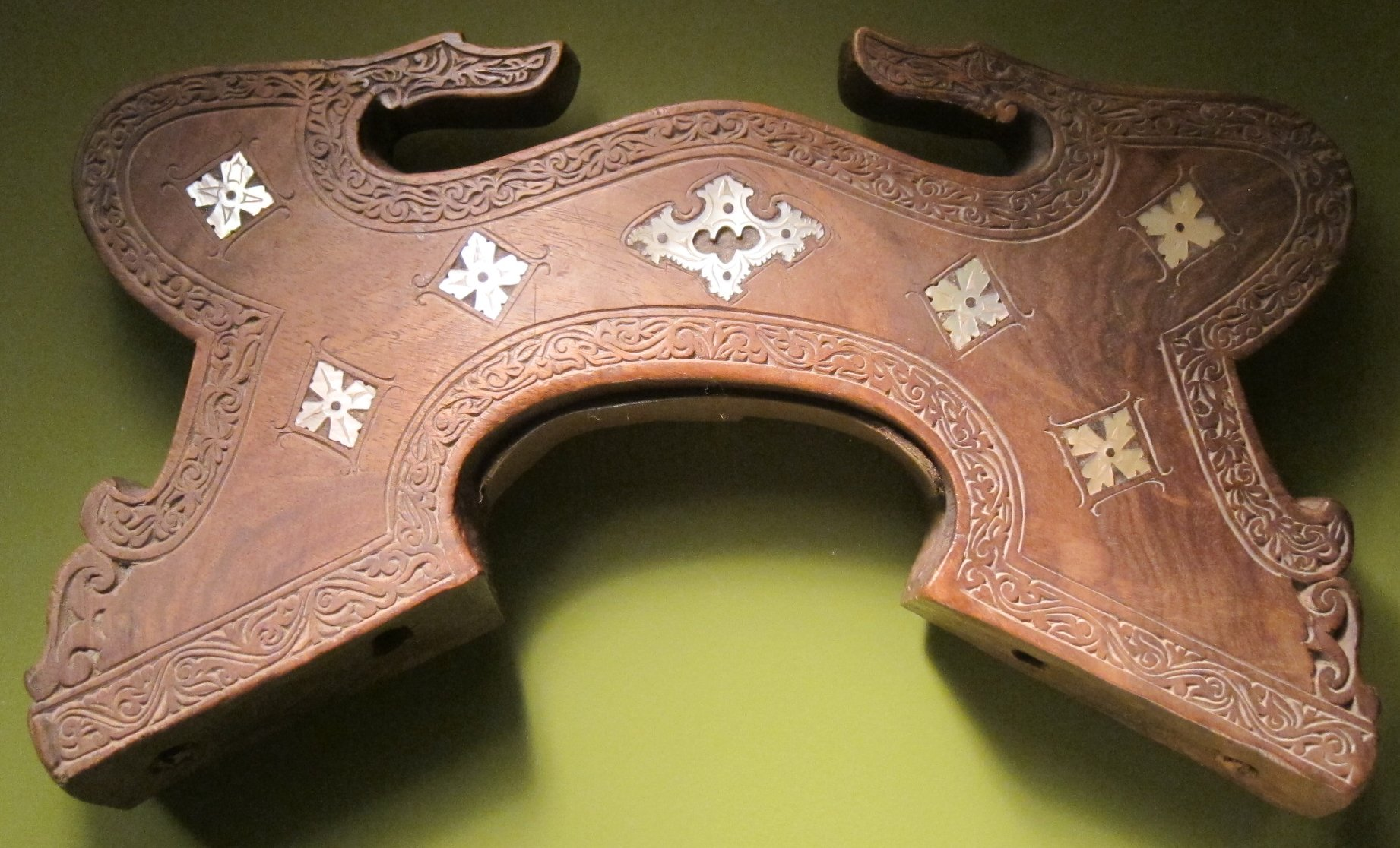
Another saddle cantle made of wood with shell inlay

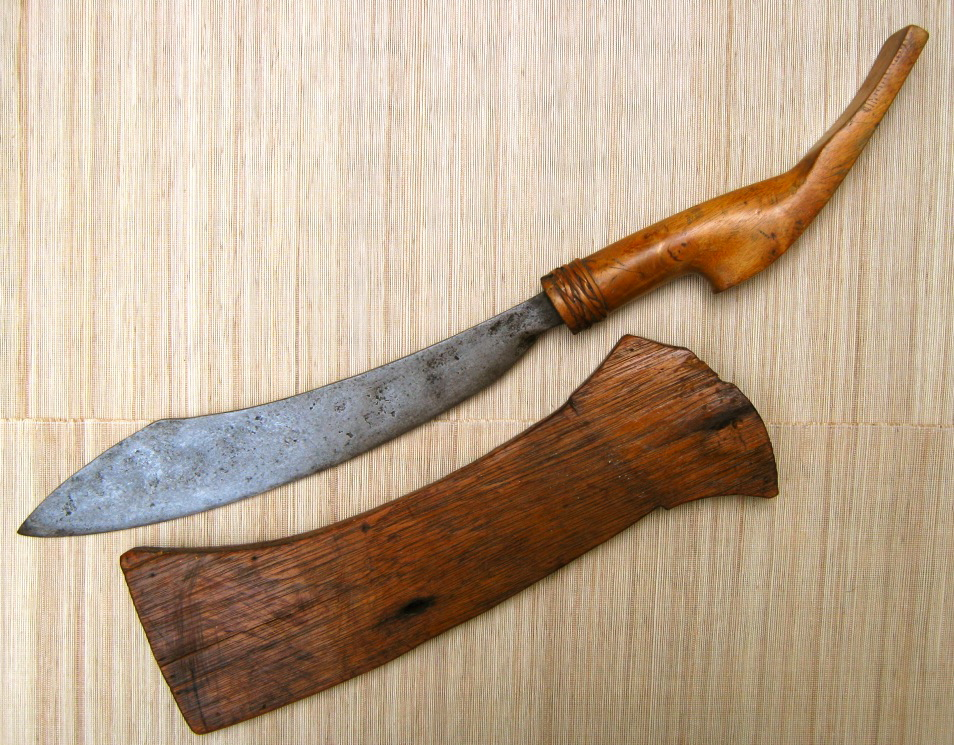
A Yakan sword called pira

== Notable Yakans ==
- Mujiv Hataman, current governor of Basilan, and former governor of the Autonomous Region of Muslim Mindanao.
- Abu Yakan, Father of all Yakans.
- Isnilon Hapilon, a jihadist. He was killed in action during the Marawi Siege by the Filipino troops.
- Hadjiman Hataman Salliman, a former 6th governor of Basilan.
- Siti Djalia Turabin, current mayor of Basilan and spouse of the current Basilan governor Mujiv Hataman.

== See also ==
- T'nalak
- Abaca
