= 2013 Autonomous Region in Muslim Mindanao general election =

2013 ARMM general election
- May 13, 2013
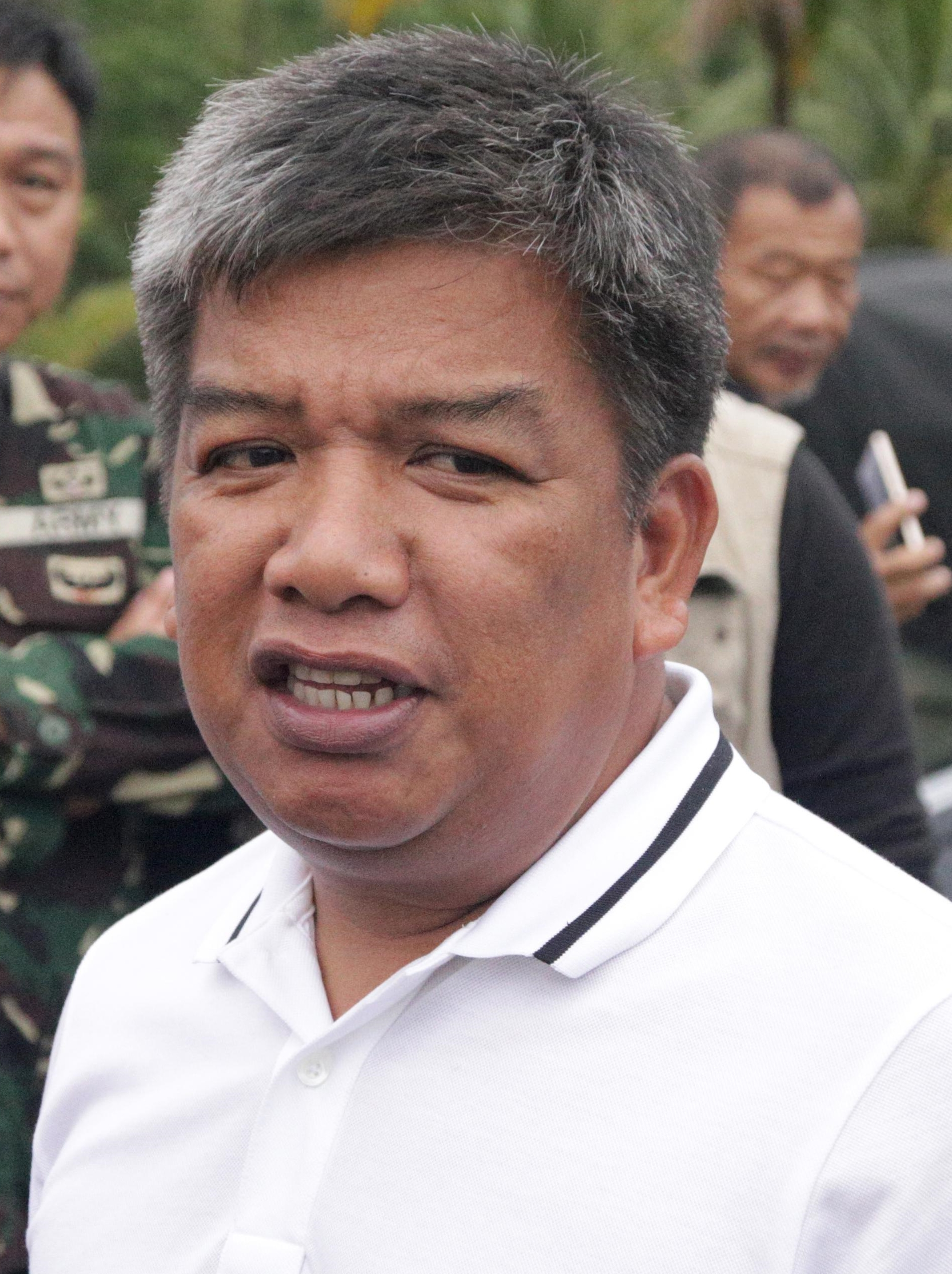

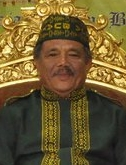
Nominee	Mujiv Hataman	Pax Mangudadatu
Party	Liberal	Independent
Running mate	Haroun Alrashid Lucman	Bashier Manalao
Popular vote	232,253	99,998
Percentage	59.30%	25.53%
Regional Governor before election
Mujiv Hataman
Liberal
Elected Regional Governor
Mujiv Hataman
Liberal

A general election was held in the Autonomous Region in Muslim Mindanao (ARMM) on May 13, 2013. Originally scheduled for October 2011, this was the first ARMM election that was synchronized with the general elections in the Philippines; previously, ARMM elections were held outside the general election day. When the elected officials of the 2008 ARMM elections ended their terms on December 22, 2011, President Benigno Aquino III appointed officers-in-charge until the officials elected in 2013 can take their place. The appointment of OICs ended the two-year transition period of all levels of Philippine national and local government that began with the campaign period for officials in the 2010 Philippine general election and preparation of automated system, first used at ARMM, to the national level through said election from 2009 to December 2011.

The governor and vice governor are elected via first past the post system; they are elected separately and may come from different parties. Elections for the regional assembly are via plurality-at-large voting, with each assembly district (coextensive with legislative districts as used in House of Representatives elections) having three seats. A voter has can vote for up to the three candidates, with the candidates with the three highest total number of votes being elected.

== Results ==
=== Regional governor ===
The election of Mujiv Hataman was announced on May 17.

2013 ARMM gubernatorial election
Party	Candidate	Votes	%
Liberal	Mujiv Hataman	232,253	59.30
Independent	Pax Mangudadatu	99,998	25.53
Independent	Nur Misuari	50,528	12.90
Independent	Yusoph Mama	6,624	1.69
DPP	Aishah Prudencio	1,203	0.31
Independent	Elsie Orenjudos	1,055	0.27
Valid ballots		391,661	84.09
Invalid or blank votes		74,114	15.91
Total votes		465,775	100.00
Liberal hold			

=== Regional vice governor ===
2013 ARMM gubernatorial election
Party	Candidate	Votes	%
Liberal	Haroun Al-Rashid Lucman	245,321	75.16
PDP–Laban	Bashier Manalao	28,863	8.84
PMP	Sultan Bob Datimbang	27,434	8.41
Independent	Abdulaziz Mangandaki	9,568	2.93
Independent	Mitchell Manalocon	5,752	1.76
Ompia	Pundatoon Bagul	5,233	1.60
Independent	Panny Sharief	2,764	0.85
Independent	Marconi Paiso	1,443	0.44
Valid ballots		326,378	70.07
Invalid or blank votes		139,397	29.92
Total votes		465,775	100.00
Liberal hold			

=== Regional assembly ===
These figures came from the COMELEC "Transparency" server and are therefore partial and unofficial.

Party	Entered	Popular vote		Seats won	
Party	Entered	Total	%	Total	%
Liberal	22	587,525	64.55%	20	83.3%
PDP–Laban	13	100,811	11.08%	1	4.2%
NPC	3	34,448	3.79%	0	0.0%
UNA	1	22,357	2.46%	0	0.0%
Ompia	3	19,894	2.19%	0	0.0%
PMP	3	19,220	2.11%	0	0.0%
Nacionalista	1	11,290	1.24%	1	4.2%
Akbayan	1	1,448	0.16%	0	0.0%
Aksyon	1	1,401	0.15%	0	0.0%
Independent	31	111,684	12.27%	3	12.5%
Totals	79	910,118	100%	24	100%
