= Politics of the Philippines =

Politics of Republic of the Philippines Politika ng Pilipinas (Filipino)
- Polity type: Unitary presidential republic
- Constitution: Constitution of the Philippines

Legislative branch
- Name: Congress
- Type: Bicameral
- Meeting place: Senate: GSIS Building; House of Representatives: Batasang Pambansa
- Upper house
- Name: Senate
- Presiding officer: Sherwin Gatchalian, Senate President
- Appointer: Plurality-at-large voting
- Lower house
- Name: House of Representatives
- Presiding officer: Bojie Dy, Speaker of the House of Representatives
- Appointer: Parallel voting

Executive branch
- Head of state and government
- Title: President
- Currently: Bongbong Marcos
- Appointer: Direct popular vote
- Cabinet
- Name: Executive departments of the Philippines
- Current cabinet: Cabinet of Bongbong Marcos
- Appointer: nominated by the President and presented to the Commission on Appointments
- Headquarters: Malacañang Palace
- Ministries: 22

Judicial branch
- Name: Judiciary of the Philippines
- Supreme Court
- Chief judge: Rodil Zalameda
- Seat: Supreme Court Building; Padre Faura St., Ermita, Manila

Politics in the Philippines are governed by a three-branch system of government. The country is a democracy, with a president who is directly elected by the people and serves as both the head of state and the head of government. The president serves as the leader of the executive branch and is a powerful political figure. A president may only hold office for one six-year term. The bicameral Congress consists of two separate bodies: the Senate, with members elected at-large across the country, and the larger House of Representatives, with members chosen mostly from specific geographic districts. The Congress performs legislative functions. The judiciary is overseen by the Supreme Court of the Philippines and has extensive review jurisdiction over judgments issued by other governmental and administrative institutions.

The legal system, which covers both civil and criminal law, has been impacted by the prior rule of both Spain and the United States. Spanish control was mostly supported by local intermediaries, which resulted in an elite-dominated system. The United States took sovereignty of the whole archipelago following the Spanish–American war, suppressing the nascent First Philippine Republic that had been declared after the end of Spanish administration. Control by the United States resulted in democracy and institutions that were fashioned after the American political system. Martial law's implementation hampered this. National politics were ruled by a two-party system when the country attained independence in 1946 and changes brought about by the restoration of democracy are what led to the multi-party system that exists today. There have been various levels of left-wing insurgencies since independence, as well as a continuous Islamic insurgency.

Elections are held every three years, although the president, vice-president, and Senators are elected for six-year terms. Results are determined through plurality voting, including plurality-at-large for elections (such as for the Senate) with multiple winners. A mixed-member proportional representation system is used to elect a minority of the House of Representatives. Local government units have some revenue-generating powers, under a code intended to decentralize power away from the national government. Administrative structures at local levels are designed to foster civil society participation.

Politics is dominated by a powerful elite, with dynastic politics common at both the local and national levels. Political parties are weak, with elections instead dominated by individual and familial personalities. Political positions provide extensive opportunities for patronage, and clientelism and electoral fraud are common. Corruption is considered widespread, while state institutions are relatively weak. Politics has been heavily influenced at times by the Catholic Church, the Philippine military, and the United States. Despite pessimism about the potential for political change, democracy maintains strong public support, and voter turnout is high.

== Executive ==
Executive power is vested in the president, who is both head of state and head of government. This individual is directly elected to a six-year term through a single-round first past the post election, and is limited to one term, so cannot seek re-election. To be eligible for the presidency, an individual must be at least 40 years old, and must have resided in the Philippines for the decade prior to the election. Presidents may legislate through executive orders and other administrative actions, and must approve or veto bills coming from the Congress.

The Malacañang Palace is the official residence of the president.

The vice president, limited to two consecutive six-year terms, is elected separately from the president. This means the president and vice president may be from different political parties. While the vice president has no constitutional powers aside from acting as president when the latter is unable to do so, the president may give the former a cabinet office. In case of death, resignation, or incapacitation, of the president, the vice president becomes the president until the expiration of the term. The vice president may also serve as Acting President if the president is temporarily incapacitated. Following in the line of succession are the Senate president and the Speaker of the House.

Executive power is exercised through the Cabinet, who are appointed by the president. While the appointees may wield executive power, all powers and responsibilities ultimately remain with the president, who may overrule any decision made by a cabinet member. The Cabinet includes the heads of executive departments. Actions taken by executive and administrative officials are taken as actions exercised by the president. Cabinet members may not be members of Congress. Close relatives of the president are explicitly barred from certain offices.

The president is also the commander in chief of the Armed Forces of the Philippines, thereby ensuring civilian supremacy over the military. This title gives the president several emergency military powers, such as the ability to suspend habeas corpus and declare martial law, although these powers automatically end after 60 days unless extended by Congress, and can be reviewed by the Supreme Court. The president also proposes a national budget, which Congress may alter before they adopt it.

The president wields significant political power, including considerable influence over supposedly independent agencies due to the power of appointment. The president directly controlled the Philippine Development Assistance Fund until the Supreme Court declared this unconstitutional in 2013. Following this, the Disbursement Acceleration Program was created to allow the president to direct funds, although some parts of this new program have similarly been declared unconstitutional. Such influence means that the legislature has never overcome a presidential veto, despite having the theoretical power to do so. A commission on appointments, independent from the legislature but made up of members from it, has the power to veto presidential appointments. However, court rulings mean the president can renominate an individual repeatedly upon rejection, and that that individual can effectively carry out the role by being officially in an acting capacity. The strength of the presidency combined with weak state institutions exacerbates corruption in the country.

Under the 1987 constitution, the House of Representatives has the power to impeach the president through a vote of one-third of its members, and the Senate decides upon the case. Impeachment proceedings against an individual can not occur more than once per year, which can be abused through the filing cases with weak impeachment claims to forestall the filing of stronger cases. President Joseph Estrada was the first Asian head of state to be tried following impeachment, although he was not ousted by the Senate. No president has ever been ousted through impeachment.

== Legislature ==
Congress is a bicameral legislature. The upper house, the Senate, is composed of 24 senators. These are elected through plurality-at-large voting, with the entire country considered a single district. The senators elect amongst themselves a Senate President. Half of the Senate seats are contested every three years, and senators are limited to serving a maximum of two consecutive six-year terms.

The lower house is the House of Representatives, currently composed of 311 representatives, with 20% elected via party-list system, and the rest elected from legislative districts. Legislative districts are intended to be roughly equal in population, and every city with a population of at least 250,000 people is guaranteed at least one representative. The House of Representatives is headed by the Speaker. Representatives are elected every three years, and are limited to three three-year terms.

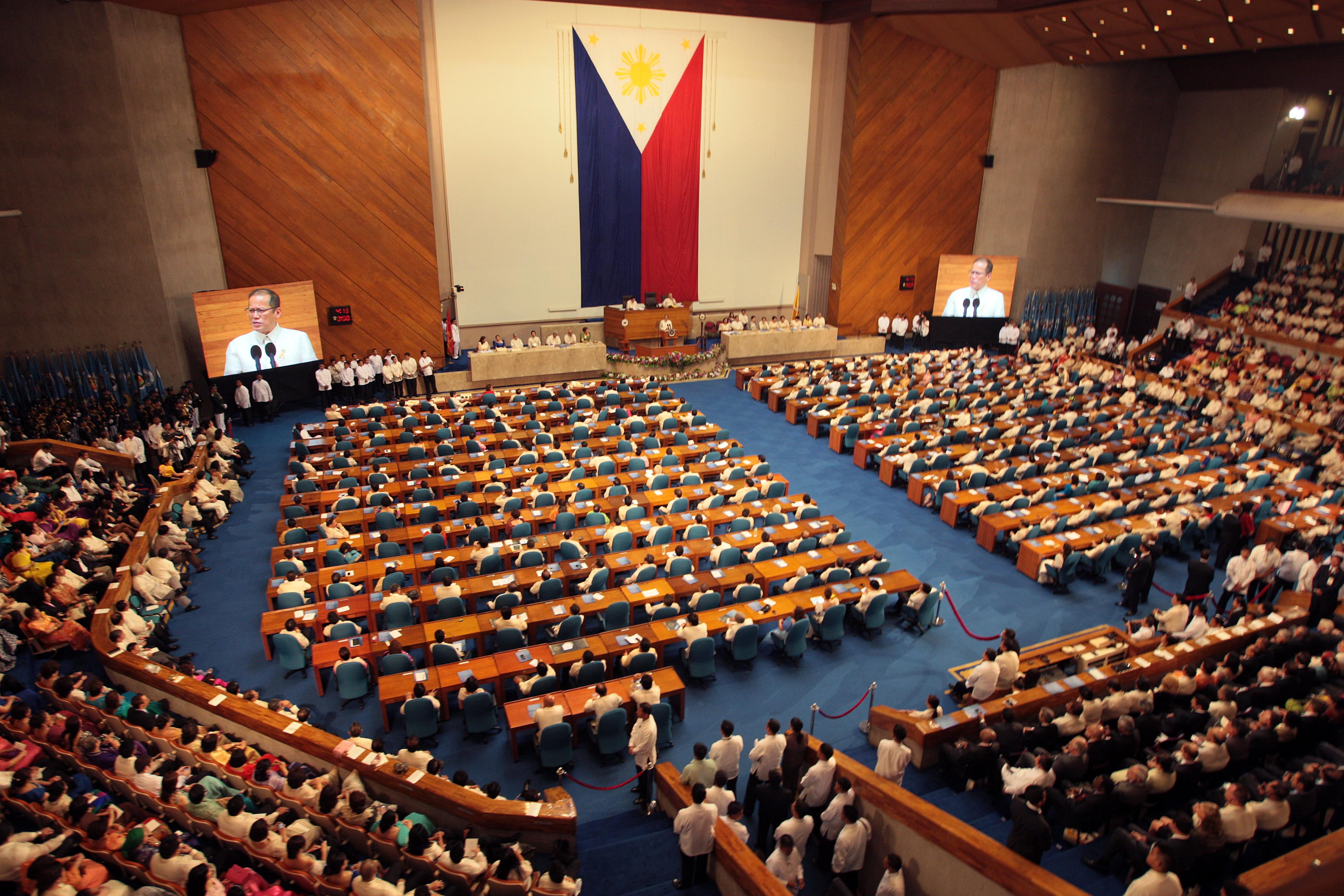
2011 State of the Nation Address by Benigno Aquino III

Each bill needs the consent of both houses to be submitted to the president for his signature. If the president vetoes the bill, Congress can override the veto with a two-thirds supermajority. If either house voted down on a bill or fails to act on it after an adjournment sine die, the bill is lost and would have to be proposed to the next congress, with the process starting all over again. Congress's decisions are mostly via majority vote, except for voting on constitutional amendments and other matters. Each house has its inherent power, with the Senate given the power to vote on treaties, while money bills may only be introduced by the House of Representatives. The constitution provides Congress with impeachment powers, with the House of Representatives having the power to impeach, and the Senate having the power to try the impeached official.

The control the legislature has over funding includes individual discretionary funds. These funds are considered an avenue for patronage politics and are often seen a symbol of corruption. They are derogatorily referred to as "pork barrel" funds. In addition to being able to use such funds to curry favor or gain support, politicians can personally benefit from kickbacks, which are often directly used for re-election campaigns. The Priority Development Assistance Fund scam highlighted the link between such funding and legislative support for executive initiatives.

As of 2019, the PDP-LABAN, the Nacionalista Party (NP), the Nationalist People's Coalition (NPC), National Unity Party (NUP), and the Liberal Party (LP) are the parties with largest membership in Congress. The party of the sitting president controls the House of Representatives, where members often change party affiliation to join the president's party. The Senate has generally acted more independently.

== Judiciary ==
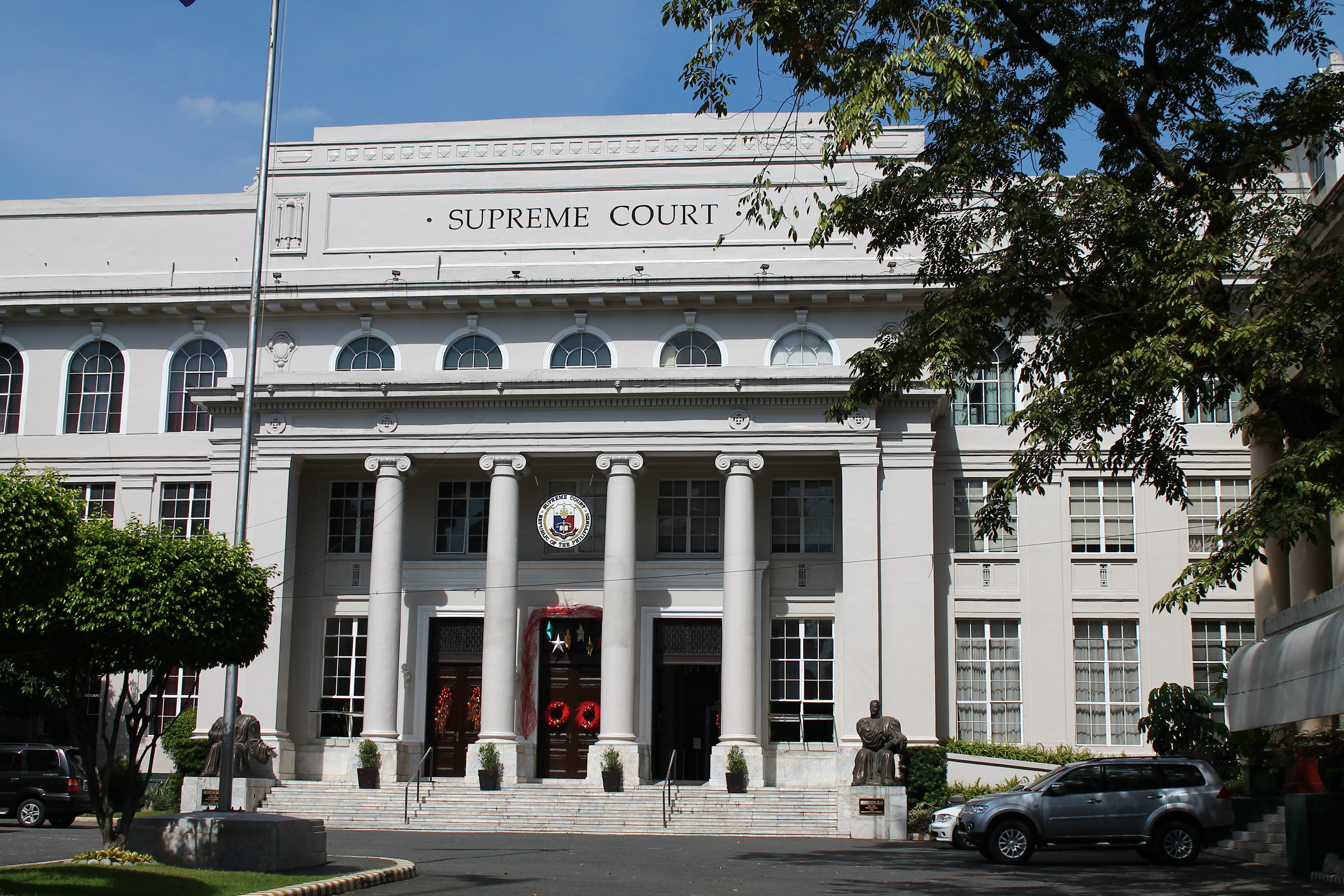
Supreme Court of the Philippines

The judiciary is headed by the Supreme Court, which lies at the top of three lower court levels. The Supreme Court is the court of last resort, and can decide on the constitutionality of laws. Vested with the responsibility of overseeing the other branches of government, the Supreme Court has significant powers, able to go as far as overruling discretionary decisions made by political and administrative individuals and bodies, giving it powers usually seen as those of the executive and legislature. The court can effectively create law without precedent, and such decisions are not subject to review by other bodies.

All lower levels of courts have their bases through legislation, rather than the constitution. Their proceedings are determined by the Supreme Court. Courts are arranged in a three-level hierarchy, with each level able to review only rulings at lower levels. Within the regular court system, the Court of Appeals is the second-highest appellate court. Below this, Regional Trial Courts have original jurisdiction on most criminal matters, and are the main trial courts. The Regional Trial Courts are organized within judicial regions, which correspond to the administrative regions. The lowest level courts are the Metropolitan Trial Courts.

Alongside the regular courts, a variety of special courts have been set up at various levels of the judicial system. The Court of Tax Appeals was set up specifically to rule on tax matters. The Sandiganbayan is a special court set up to deal with cases of government corruption. Some Regional Trial Courts specialize in a particular sort of case, such as heinous crime courts, family courts, and environmental courts. Sharia courts, which have been set up in some regions on the same level as Regional and Metropolitan courts, rule on personal law where both parties are Muslim. Some administrative bodies are able to exercise very specific quasi-judicial powers, as determined by law.

The president appoints justices and judges to the judicial system. For an appointment to the Supreme Court, the president must select from a short-list provided by the Judicial and Bar Council, although they have influence over the shortlist and can ask for it to be changed. The Judicial and Bar Council is responsible for vetting appointments. Congress has no control over appointments, to reduce its political influence on the judiciary. However, the Chief Justice can be impeached by the legislature, which took place for the first time with the conviction of Chief Justice Renato Corona in 2012. Political pressure is thought to be behind inconsistencies between some court decisions. Traditionally the most senior associate justice became the Chief Justice. However, this tradition was broken by President Gloria Macapagal Arroyo, and her successor President Benigno Aquino III also bypassed seniority in some judicial appointments.

The Ombudsman of the Philippines is selected by the president from a list provided by the Judicial and Bar Council. This selection does not need confirmation, and lasts for a seven-year term with no re-appointment. The Ombudsman investigates and prosecutes public officials and agencies, except for the president, who is immune while in office. Considerable power lies with the position to request information and direct public officials to carry out certain tasks as required by law. The Office of the Solicitor General is an independent body that represents the government in legal cases.

== Legal system ==
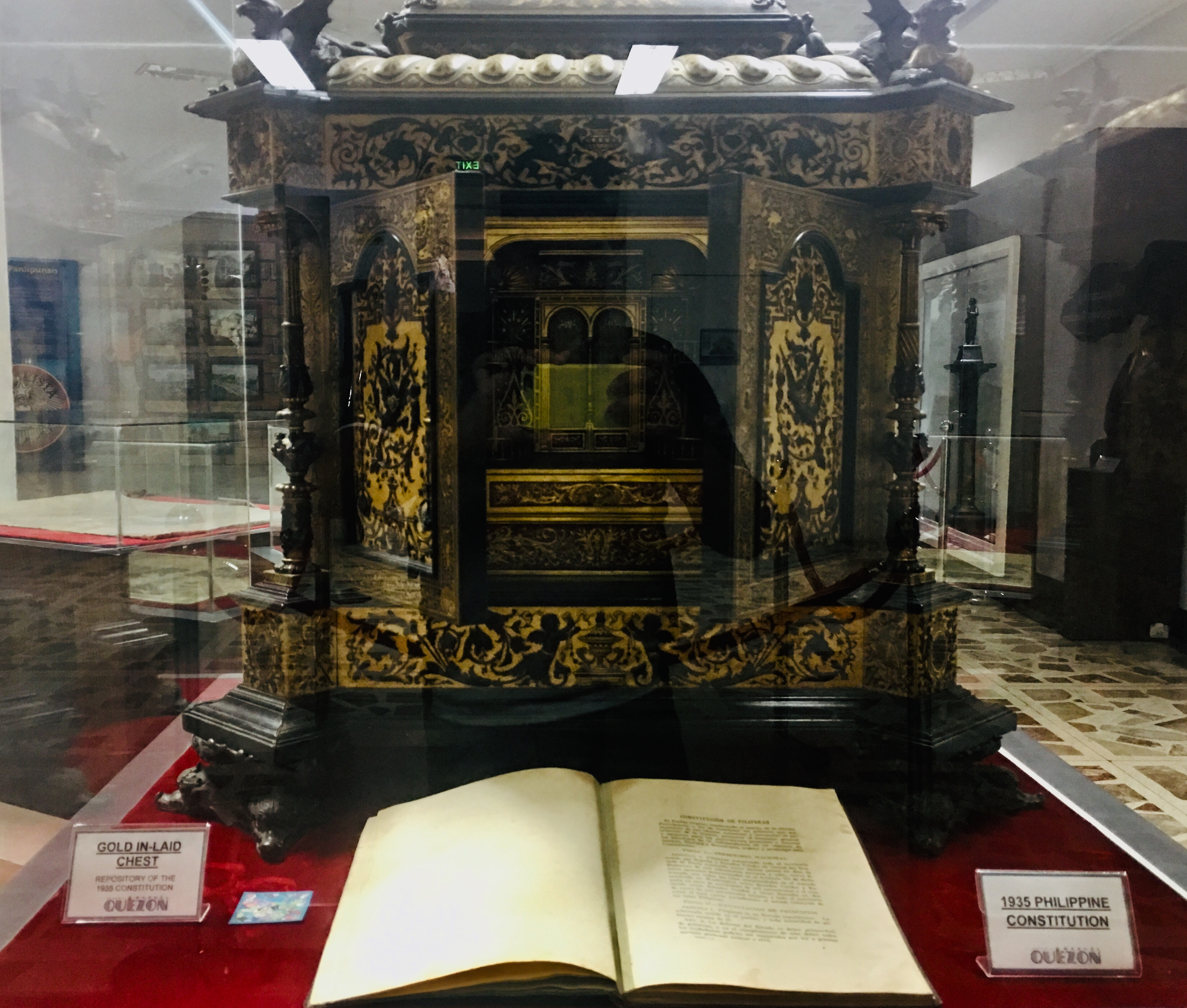
The 1935 Constitution of the Philippines, which served as the basis for the current constitution

The Philippine legal system is a hybrid form based on the Spanish civil law and American common law system, with a system of Sharia law in place for some areas of law involving Muslims.

The Constitution is the supreme law of the land and laws passed by the Congress must be consistent with the Constitution. Since the establishment of the 1898 Constitution, there have been only three new constitutions, implemented in 1935, 1973, and 1987, respectively. Prior to 1898, the Spanish Constitution of 1812 had applied to the Philippines for a short time, and there were numerous proposed constitutions during the Philippine Revolution. The most notable of these was the Malolos Constitution. The presidential system established with the 1935 Constitution was replaced by a semi-parliamentary system in 1973 under the authoritarian rule of President Marcos, concentrating power in his hands.

After the 1986 People Power Revolution brought President Aquino to power, she issued a proclamation establishing a temporary constitution and created a constitutional commission. The commission finished writing a new constitution on October 15, 1986, which was subsequently approved by referendum on February 2, 1987. The 1987 constitution restored the presidential system, being based on the 1935 constitution rather than the 1973 one. The constitution is designed to provide a number of checks and balances, including the establishment of independent constitutional commissions and an Ombudsman. The Ombudsman and members of these commissions, in addition to the leaders of the executive (the president and vice-president) and judicial (Justices of the Supreme Court, including the Chief Justice) branches, may be removed through impeachment.

All presidents under the current constitution have proposed some type of constitutional reform, although none have succeeded. Wariness around such change exists due to the structural aim of the constitution in limiting Presidential power compared to previous constitution, leaving reform open to accusations of being a power grab. A switch to a unicameral parliamentary system is seen by some as a way to make the legislature and government more responsive and effective. It has also been argued such a change would weaken the presidency, and strengthen the role of political parties. Such a proposal gained majority support in the house along with presidential support in the mid-2000s, but stalled due to senate opposition. Reforming the country as a federation is a recurring issue arising as a result of a desire for local autonomy. Such considerations influenced the 1987 constitution; while it maintained the unitary state, it included provisions for autonomous regions and for stronger local government.

The Civil Code of the Philippines is based on the Civil Code of Spain, which was extended to the Philippines on July 31, 1889. A notable feature of this code is the influence of the Catholic Church, which remains to this day. Under this code, judicial decisions applying or interpreting the laws or the Constitution is part of the legal system, the doctrine of stare decisis applies in deciding legal controversies. However, the application of stare decisis is not the same as in full common law jurisdictions, as it incorporates civil law precedent. The constitution grants the Supreme Court the power of judicial review, through which it can "determine whether or not there has been a grave abuse of discretion amounting to lack or excess of jurisdiction on the part of any branch or instrumentality of the Government".

This power is extensive enough that the court can create new law without precedent in such situations, and such decisions are not themselves subject to review from another body. The president may issue executive orders, proclamations or other executive issuance. The Philippines adopts the dualist system in the incorporation of international law, with such laws able to come into force either through adoption in domestic legislation or a constitutional declaration. The local legislative assemblies may enact local ordinances within their respective territorial and political boundaries in accordance with the local autonomy granted by the Local Government Code.

== Elections ==
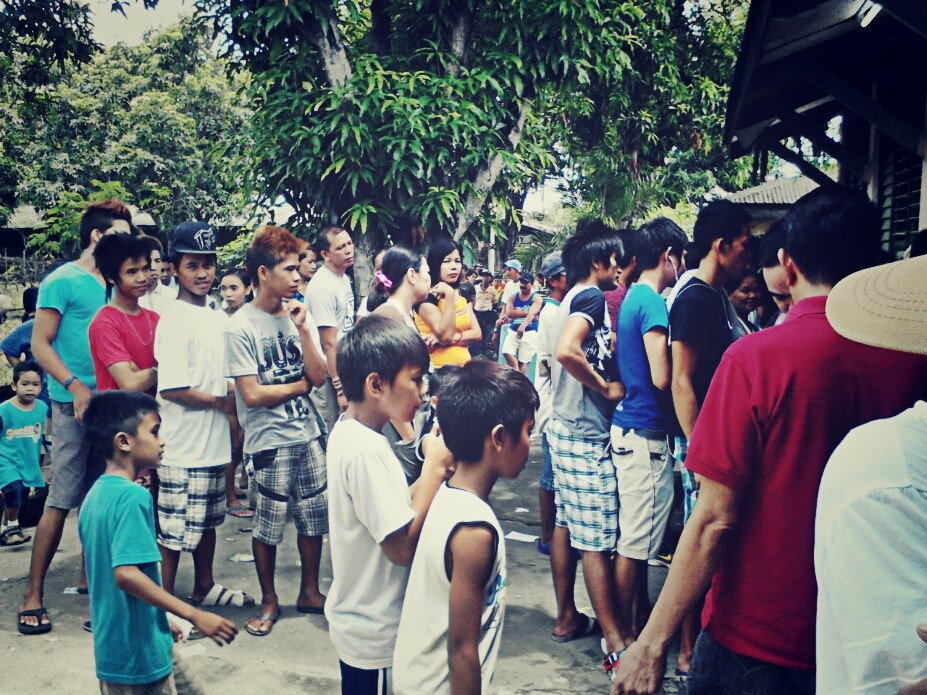
Voting lines in Mabalacat during the 2013 elections

Since 1935 and the establishment of the Commonwealth of the Philippines, elections have been administered by the Commission on Elections (COMELEC). The elected officials are the president, vice president, members of Congress, regional governors and assemblymen, provincial governors, vice governors, and board members, city and municipal mayors, vice mayors and councilors, and barangay (village) chairmen and councilors. Elections are for fixed terms. Most elected officials have three-year terms, with the exceptions being the president, vice president, and senators, whose terms last for six years.

All terms above the barangay level begin and end on June 30 of the election year, and all elected officials are limited to three consecutive terms, except for senators, and the vice president, who are limited to two, and for the president, who cannot be reelected. 12 of the 24 senators are up for election every 3 years. All are elected on a national basis, with voters selecting up to 12 names from the list of all candidates. It is not required to fill out 12 names for the vote to be valid, and voters select 7.5 candidates on average. This system increases the importance of name familiarity, with up to one-fifth of voters reporting they decide upon their votes while inside the voting booth. All positions are voted on separately, including those of president and vice-president.

Despite the plurality voting system used to elect presidents, elections are effectively a multi-party system. Prior to the Marcos regime, the country effectively had a two-party system, however the restriction of presidents to one term in the 1987 has likely prevented that system from reemerging. Even during the two-party era, internal party structures were weak. Three presidents had previously switched parties after falling to obtain the nomination in their previous party's conference. Under the 1987 constitution, elections above the barangay level are held every three years since 1992 on the second Monday of May, although senate seats, the presidency, and the vice presidency are only contested every six years since 1992.

Ever since elections were first introduced by the United States, single-winner elections have been carried out using a plurality voting system: the candidate with the highest number of votes is elected. Multiple-winner elections, except for representatives elected through the party-list system, are done via plurality-at-large voting. Each voter has x votes, from which the x candidates with the highest number of votes are elected. A constitutional commission was assembled after the 1986 People Power Revolution in part to consider the process of elections. It determined to keep plurality/first-past-the-post voting for 80% of seats, but to use a mixed-member proportional representation party-list system to allocate up to 20% of seats. However, such a system was not used until the 1998 general election, which followed the passing of the Party-List System Act in 1995. Prior to this law passing, sectoral representatives were appointed by the President.

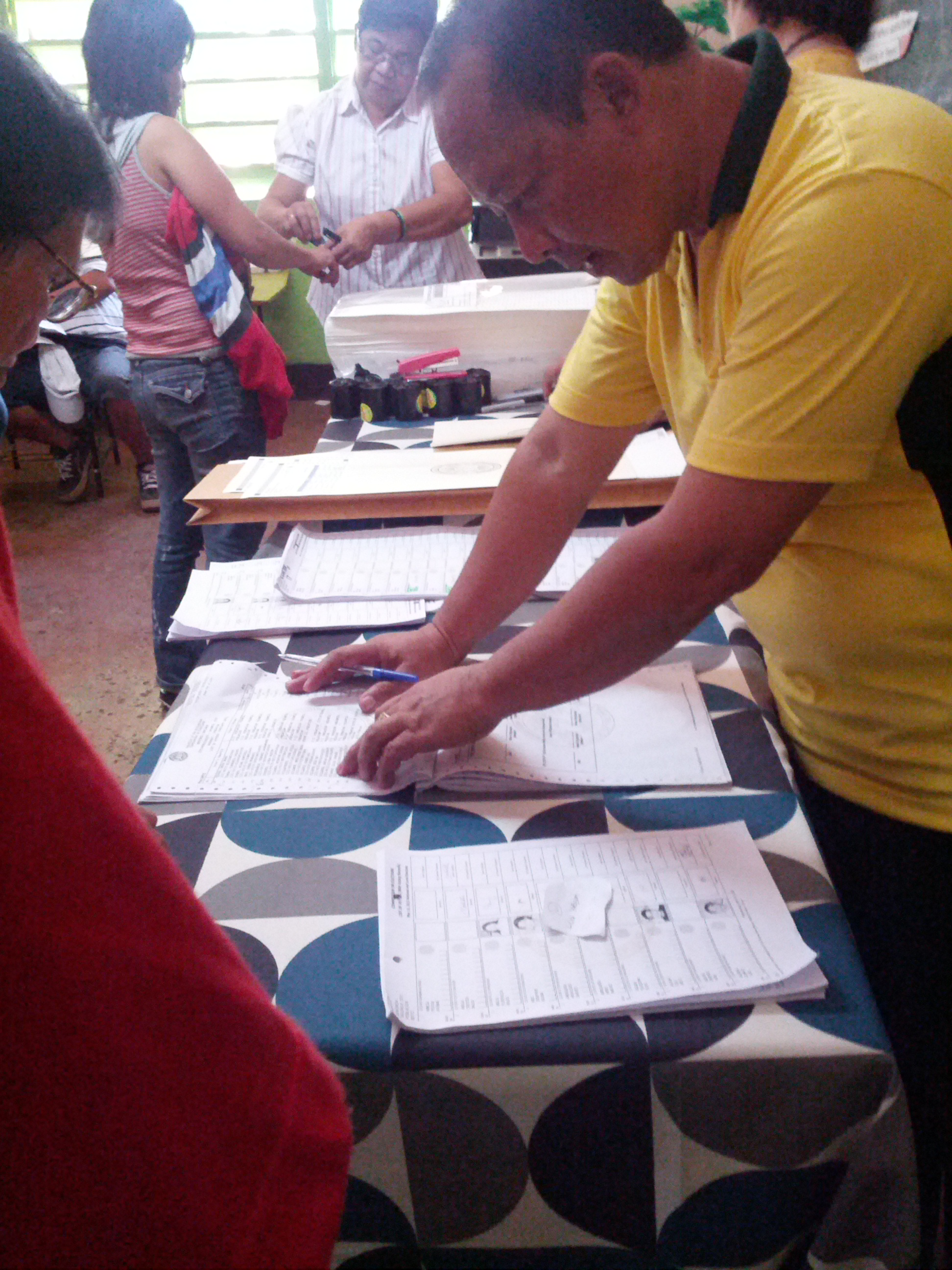
Electoral official in Valencia checking an electoral roll during the 2013 elections

A group participating in the party-list system (which may not be running in any single-member constituencies) must receive 2% of votes cast to enter congress, and can win a maximum of three seats. The 1998 election saw 123 organizations run, and only 32% of voters selecting a party-list organization, meaning only 13 organizations passed the 2% threshold taking up only 14 of the 52 seats allocated to party-list organizations. COMELEC decided to allocate the remaining seats to organizations that had not reached the 2% threshold despite prior rules indicating they would be distributed among parties that passed the threshold by vote share. Following a legal challenge, the Supreme Court overruled COMELEC, implementing its own system to allocate the seats, limiting the maximum three seats to only the most-voted organization. In the run-up to the 2001 election COMELEC approved over 160 organizations. Following a legal challenge at the Supreme Court COMELEC all but 42 were disqualified, including seven which had won more than 2% of the votes. Two court later nullified two of the disqualifications.

The 1986 commission also kept the "open ballot" system, where voters had to write the name of their chosen candidate on the voting form. The distribution of sample filled-in ballots to voters by politicians provided more opportunities for patronage through the determination of which other names appear on a politicians sample ballot, and increased the power of local politicians who were better able to distribute these ballots to voters. The 1992 and 2004 presidential elections were contested in court following accusations of electoral fraud. Neither case succeeded.

Vote counting in these elections could take up to 18 hours, and tabulation could take up to 40 days. In 1992 COMELEC adopted a strategic plan to modernize voting, and the first electronic vote-counting pilot test took place in the 1996 Autonomous Region in Muslim Mindanao general election. This pilot was considered a success. In 1997 a law was based calling for the open ballots to be replaced by pre-printed ballots. However, it was not until the May 2010 elections that electronic vote-counting was used for a national election. This change in the process saw ballots shift from the "open ballot" system to ballots where voters fill in ovals next to the candidate names. It has been reported by COMELEC that this new system reduces the ability for vote-buyers to monitor how people vote. It also reduced vote count time, with manual counting previously taking perhaps months.

National and local elections began to be held on the same day from May 1992, following the passage of Republic Act (RA) 7166. The country has a voting age of 18. Under the 1987 constitution all registered parties are allowed poll watchers, whereas under the previous system poll watchers were only allowed from the two main parties. Political advertising was allowed beginning in 2001. Various forms of electoral fraud occur throughout the various elections, and are even expected by a majority of voters. Vote buying is especially prevalent, and campaigns are estimated to cost as much as 16 times the legal campaign finance limit.

== Local government ==
Local government hierarchy

President of the Philippines
Autonomous regions
Provinces	Independent cities	Provinces	Independent cities
Component cities	Municipalities	Component cities	Municipalities
Barangays	Barangays	Barangays	Barangays	Barangays	Barangays

Barangays are grouped into cities and municipalities. Most cities and municipalities are then grouped into provinces. Some provinces and independent cities are further grouped into autonomous regions.

The Philippines has been highly centralized since Spanish rule, being governed from an "Imperial Manila". The Spanish created some bodies to bring together barangays in 1893, and the Americans organized provincial governments in 1905. Both actions, however, left the majority of power with the capital. During the Commonwealth period, local governments remained under the direct control of the president, before some autonomy was granted to cities and municipalities in 1959 through RA 2264, "An Act Amending the Laws Governing Local Governments by Increasing their Autonomy and Reorganizing Provincial Governments", and to barangays (then called barrios) through RA 2370, the "Barrio Charter Act". Further powers were given under the "Decentralization Act of 1967" (RA 5185) before local elections were abolished with the imposition of martial law in 1972.

The 1987 constitution mandates that local governments must have local autonomy. The 1991 Local Government Code (Republic Act 7160) shifted some power away from the capital. Barangays are grouped into municipalities or cities, while municipalities and cities may be further grouped into provinces. Each barangay, municipality or city, and the province is headed by a captain, mayor, or governor, respectively, with its legislatures being the Sangguniang Barangay (village council), the Sangguniang Bayan (municipal council) or the Sangguniang Panlungsod (city council), and the Sangguniang Panlalawigan (provincial board), respectively. The Local Government Code seeks to enhance civil participation in local government, mandating civil society representation on bodies such as school and health boards. There are also mechanisms for the recall of elected officials, and local legislation through publicly organized referendum, although such mechanisms are rarely used.

Regions are groupings of adjacent provinces created by the national government, often with linguistic or ethnic similarities. However, they do not by themselves have any local government. The exception is the autonomous region in Muslim Mindanao, which has its own regional government. While Article X of the 1987 constitution allows autonomous regions in the Cordilleras and Muslim Mindanao, only the Bangsamoro Autonomous Region in Muslim Mindanao (BARMM) exists. A referendum held in 1989 led to four provinces voting to be part of the Autonomous Region of Muslim Mindanao (ARMM). In 1990 elections were held for a regional governor, a vice-governor, and for representatives in the Regional Assembly.

A 2018 law confirmed through a 2019 plebiscite transformed the ARMM into the more powerful BARMM. Elections in Mindanao have a reputation for electoral anomalies. Two laws aimed at creating the proposed autonomous region in Cordillera were defeated after two plebiscites. The National Capital Region has a unique governing body, the Metropolitan Manila Development Authority, which carries out some region-equivalent functions.

The concentration of political and economic power in Manila leads has created the demand for changes such as decentralization or federalism. Most of the local governments' budgets are derived from the Internal Revenue Allotment (IRA), a disbursement from the national government's budget. This makes most local government units ultimately dependent on the national government, with provinces further from the capital, which tend to be poorer, more reliant on IRA funding from the national government. However, local governments do have the ability to raise income through other measures, such as taxes, which is reflected by significantly increased responsibilities.

== Culture and influences ==
Despite the challenges faced by Filipino elections, and a sometimes pessimistic view about the potential of elections, there is broad public support for democracy, coupled with a free press and an established legal system. Voter turnout in legislative and executive elections averages above 75 percent. However, other forms of political participation, such as membership in a political party, civil society organization, and labor unions, are rarely used. There are several examples of mass direct action throughout history, including the long-running communist rebellion in the Philippines and the multiple "People Power" events. A distrust of the state, and of state institutions such as the police, is a continuing legacy of martial law.

Political parties continue to be weak, often created to propel a single candidate before fading from relevancy. The power of the president within the political system may be one factor limiting the development of stable political parties, as the president is in a position to considerably support their allies. Parties often serve to ally various political families, and it is common for politicians elected on losing party tickets to switch allegiance to the party of the president. The power of traditional elites outside of the government has also inhibited the development of strong national institutions. Broad democratic political debate is linked with the concept of good governance, rather than political movements related to class. The persistence of poverty is widely linked in political discourse to the presence of corruption. Campaigns focus on personal qualities and records, rather than party platforms. A 2026 opinion poll found Filipinos' main concerns included inflation, low wages and corruption.

There has been strong continuity in class structures from the Spanish period to the present. One prominent historical narrative sees Philippine history through the lens of an "unfinished revolution", tracing the takeover of the Philippine Revolution by elites from the masses to unfulfilled expectations of reform following the People Power Revolution. Electoral pressure is absorbed through elections, despite the winners of elections invariably coming from various factions of the elite, and political parties being differentiated more by patronage networks than by policies. The importance of election funding creates a cyclic effect as political positions provide access to state power which provides the ability to generate funds. This state capture means that reforms occur slowly, even if popular.

While questions over land reform have persisted since the colonial era, and have been considered by multiple administrations faced with peasant and communist-related political instability, the links between legislators and landlords mean progress has been limited and the vast majority of farmers continue to work on land owned by others. This failure to achieve significant land reform is thought to have restricted the growth of the Philippine economy, and is linked to continuing political inequality. Despite such inequality, the strength of the left movement has declined since the restoration of democracy.

A small professional and technical middle class, mostly concentrated in urban areas such as Metro Manila, are relatively trusted within the civil service and play a significant role in civil society organization. Such organizations are examples of cause-based politics, an exception to the usual model of Philippine political parties and political organization. While too small to change the overall political structure, civil society organizations are sometimes able to influence policy on specific issues. Notably, the role they played in the People Power Revolution led to a brief political consensus towards a more technocratic and relatively economically liberal state.

Some tension exists between this middle class with the larger but less active poorer class, most clearly expressed in the different outcomes and opinions regarding the entwined EDSA II and EDSA III protests. Unlike in the first People Power Revolution, which saw joint participation from both classes, these following mass protests are generally considered to have predominantly middle and lower class movements respectively, with EDSA III failing to overturn the success of EDSA II.

Politicians at local and national levels are usually either dynastic candidates or popular celebrities. Dynastic politics is very common. Members of the House and local government officials can be elected for a maximum of three terms, although positions often pass to family members. In 1992, 32% of the representatives in the restored Congress were children of politicians, and 15% represented a third or fourth generation. In 2010, over half of the members of the House of Representatives and over half of all Governors were related to someone who had been in Congress over the previous 20 years. Over 60% of high-level local elective offices were held by a dynastic candidate. For both dynastic candidates and celebrities, voter familiarity with their names is thought to drive their electoral success.

Levels of education correlate with voting for each of the types of candidates, with those with less education more likely to vote for celebrity candidates and those with more education more likely to vote for dynastic candidates. Less wealthy voters are more likely to vote for celebrity candidates, although it has little impact on votes for dynastic candidates. Older voters are more likely to vote for celebrity candidates, and voters in Luzon are more likely to vote for celebrity candidates than voters in the Visayas or Mindanao. While the constitution bans political dynasties, no legislation has been passed to define what this means. Term limits have had a limited effect on such dynasties.

In addition to strong divisions in class identity, the Philippines has a diversity of regional identities, driven by its archipelagic nature and varied history. Regional and ethnic identities are sometimes stronger than national identity, with national identity often being driven by Christians, and more specifically Tagalogs. Contrasted with the broad Christian Filipino identity is that of the Muslims, and that of often-marginalized indigenous peoples. Winning a presidential election usually comes with winning the highly populous Tagalog areas of Southern Luzon. Most winning candidates have done well throughout the Philippines, winning pluralities in Luzon, the Visayas, and Mindanao. However, some elections have been won without the Visayas or Mindanao, and in a single case, the 2004 election, the Presidency was won without a plurality in Luzon. However, the importance of national image has been increasing in presidential contests.

Despite the centralization of national power, politics itself is very decentralized. Political patronage relationships extend vertically through the various levels of political administration. National politicians then relied on local politicians to drive turnout within the constituency of the local politician, incentivizing government funding of local projects rather than national ones to shore up support, and causing national political parties to function more as an alliance of local politicians rather than centralized platforms.

Decentralization of power to local governments and widespread poverty have reinforced the presence of clientelism within politics. Such an effect is particularly strong in the geographically defined House of Representative seats. The importance of name recognition in politics (especially under the open ballot system) and the use of single-member district entrenchs local politicians. Politics is defined by clans and personalities rather than political parties, and politicians receive support from members of their linguistic group or from a geographical area that identifies with them. Political, cultural, and geographical borders are mutually reinforcing.

Factional rivalries have dominated local politics since the late 19th century. As democracy expanded under American rule, these rivalries influenced provincial and national politics. Local politics is thus often more personal and potentially violent than national politics. It can also grow more authoritarian, even as national politics becomes more democratic. The competitiveness of different localities varies greatly, from having a long-entrenched dynasty, to having regular electoral turnover.

Furthermore, a strong emphasis on family, so entrenched it is enshrined in the civil code, makes local familial links more important than state support, and personal links more important than ideological interests. (Note: Families in Filipino culture refer not just to the nuclear family, but to a wide network of both blood and marriage ties.) Particular families are associated with certain areas, and a seat passing within a family is often seen as political continuity, with competition provided instead by seats passing to another family. A paternalistic landlord-tenant relationship typifies politician voter relationships in rural areas.

Local politicians attend events such as baptisms, funerals, and weddings within their constituency, often providing a direct financial donation. In urban areas, where established patron-client links are weaker, patronage takes the form of machine politics, being more specific and short-term. In such situations, electoral fraud and physical coercion is more common. Vote buying is extremely prevalent, including "negative vote buying", where voters are taken out of their constituency on voting day or have their fingers inked without having cast a ballot. Over time, this model of control, supported through the economic benefits of state capture, has become more prominent compared to the older paternalistic model.

=== Catholic Church ===
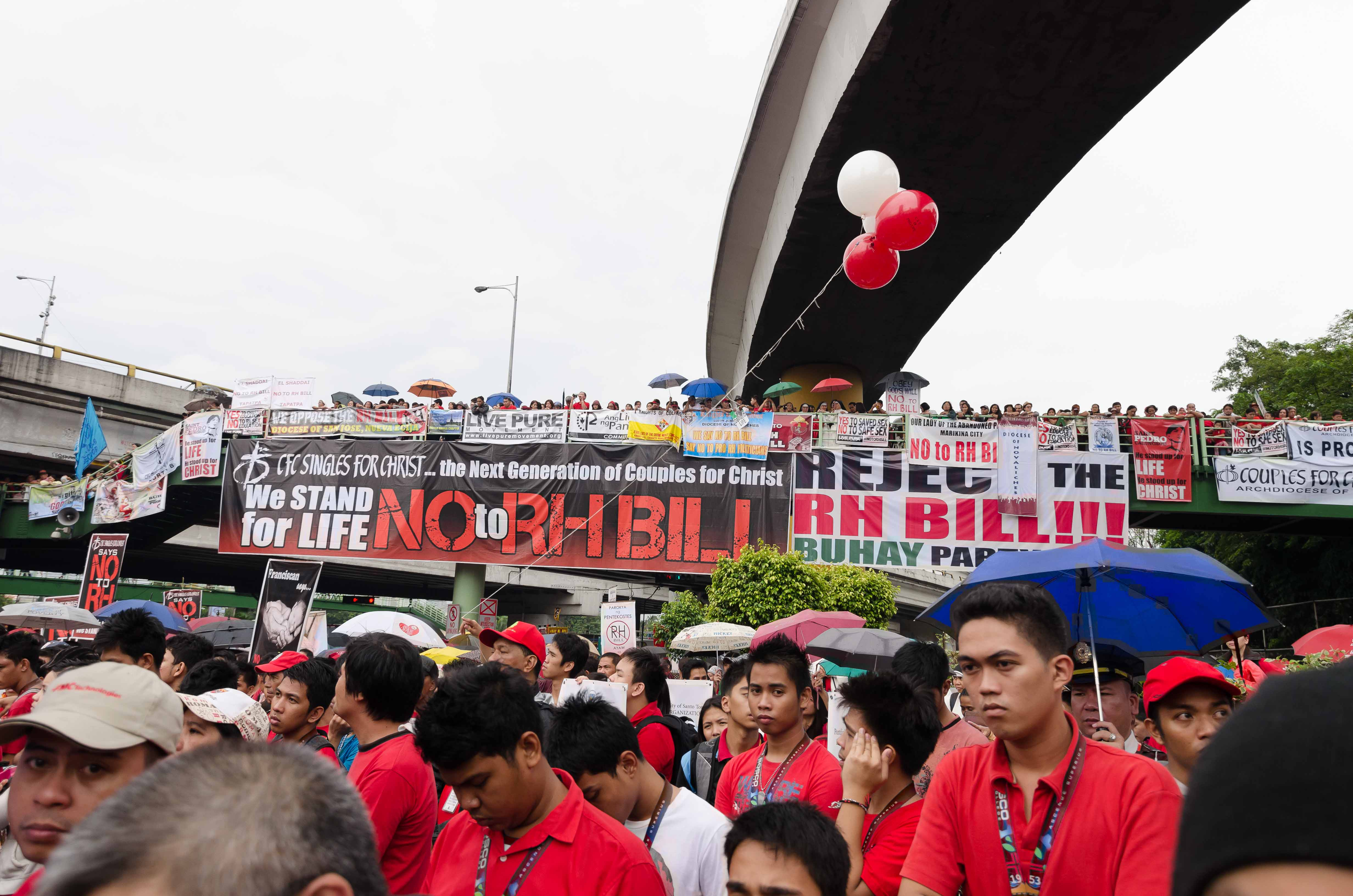
Protests against the Reproductive Health Act of 2012 (RH Bill)

The influence of the Church in civil society dates back to the Spanish era, when the Church exercised considerable secular power. Despite the separation of Church and State that was established under American rule, the Church retained social influence among both elites and the wider population and a desire to promote its global values within the country. The Church provides a unifying moral framework that transcends class lines, linking the rich with the poor.

National structures were established shortly after independence, and the Church became directly involved in elections, both through its administrative hierarchy and through the actions of individual clergy. The politicization of the Church increased after the Second Vatican Council, in great part due to the activism of Catholic youth. Another factor was the increasing filipinization of the Church following independence. The Church did not initially strongly oppose Marcos and agreed with his anti-communist stance. However, internal opposition grew over the course of the martial law era.

Public political opposition from individual clergy members eventually shifted the opinion of the Church hierarchy, who supported the candidacy of Corazon Aquino and the subsequent People Power Revolution. Due to these events, the Church began to see itself as a "guardian of democracy". Later, the Church was one of the institutions that became opposed to the Presidency of Joseph Estrada.

Religious orders, such as the Society of Jesus and Opus Dei, run private educational establishments for law, medicine, and business. The Church is active in social and economic development, in ways not always in alignment with the desire of state authorities. It has organized to assist in anti-corruption efforts. The Church maintains strong influence on the topic of family, notably through its support of large family size and its opposition to birth control. Catholic influence led to the removal of divorce laws following independence.

The political influence of the Church has decreased in the 21st century, following sexual abuse revelations and the death of the prominent Cardinal Jaime Sin. A symbolic moment for Church influence was the passing of the Reproductive Health Act of 2012 by the Benigno Aquino administration. This law aimed to make contraception and family planning more accessible, a topic which had faced long-standing Church opposition. Public opinion was thought to be in favor of the law. The Rodrigo Duterte administration has also clashed with the Church, with Duterte at times directly positioning himself against the Church. While Duterte himself is not in favor of a divorce law, proposals to legalize divorce gained significant support in Congress following his election, with one bill being passed by the House of Representatives before rejection by the Senate. The measure was reintroduced in the next session of Congress. During the 2022 presidential elections campaign, the Church endorsed the candidacy of vice president Leni Robredo to prevent Bongbong Marcos, son of dictator Ferdinand Marcos, from winning the election. Robredo, who won in 18 of the 86 dioceses in the country, lost the presidential race in a landslide.

=== Military ===
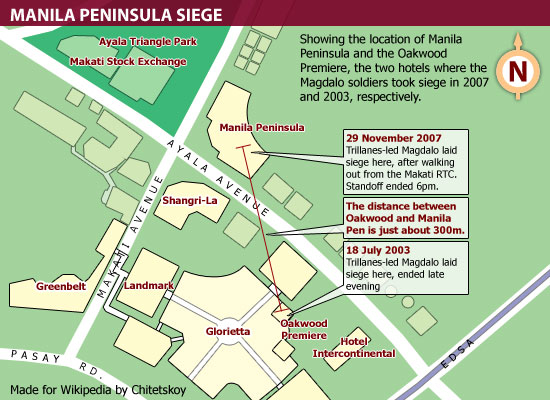
The 2003 Oakwood mutiny and 2007 Manila Peninsula siege saw prominent buildings in Makati occupied by military forces in opposition to the Gloria Macapagal Arroyo administration.

The Philippine military became officially involved in socioeconomic issues during the Hukbalahap Rebellion. Its involvement was expanded further by Ferdinand Marcos, who actively used the military for civil work. While the 1935 constitution designated the president the Commander in Chief, the 1973 constitution was the first to explicitly include the principle of civilian control of the military. Despite this change, during martial law under Marcos, military leaders took over aspects of local government and became directly involved in the economy, and the military itself expanded threefold. During this period, the communist and Islamist rebellions in the Philippines led to further involvement by the military in politics. Internal opposition to Marcos developed as corruption became more apparent, and following the 1986 elections an apparently failed coup by a military faction sparked what became the People Power Revolution The military's perceived role in this overthrowing of President Marcos created a precedent for direct intervention into politics.

The 1987 constitution kept the 1973 text on civilian rule over the military, although it added that the armed forces were the "protector of the people and the state". It also separated the Philippine Constabulary from the military, while shifting response for internal security from the military to the police. However, the military has remained more involved in politics than it was before martial law, playing a role in the 2001 Second EDSA Revolution which overthrew President Estrada. Failed or suspected coups took place in the late 1980s, 2003, 2006, and 2007.

Civilian oversight of the military includes a dedicated deputy ombudsman for the military, investigation by the Commission on Human Rights, and the jurisdiction of civilian courts. The 1989 Philippine coup d'état attempt led to rebellion and mutiny becoming crimes. As an institution the military is supportive of democracy, with many factions often coming out in opposition to attempted coups. However, weak civilian institutions continue to provide openings for military influence. Amnesty was granted to those involved in past coup attempts in 1992.

The practice of recruiting retired military officers for some executive branch roles, such as ambassadorships, or within cabinet, was started by Marcos and continued after the restoration of democracy. The separation between the police and the military was impeded by the continuing communist and Islamic rebellions. The president remains able to use the military to rule by decree. Localized instances of martial law have been declared in 2009 and 2017, both in Mindanao.

=== United States ===
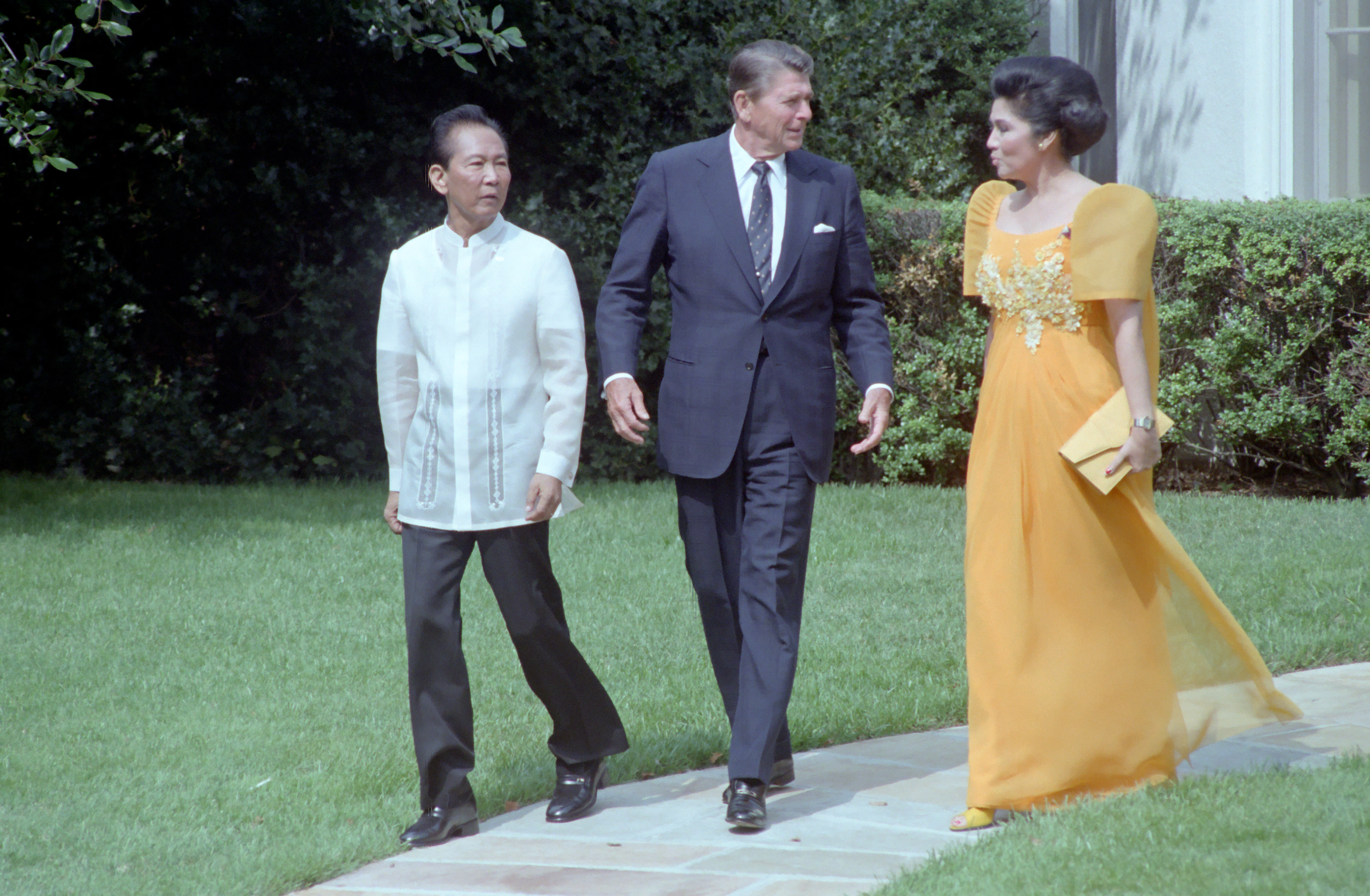
Philippine President Ferdinand Marcos, American President Ronald Reagan, and Imelda Marcos during a Philippine state visit to the United States

Even after Philippine independence, the United States remained entwined within Philippine politics and the Philippine economy. Influence also remains in social and civil institutions. In the context of the Cold War, direct and indirect influence was leveraged in the early days of independence to reinforce democratic institutions. Early civil influence was particularly strong among veterans' networks, and the American military maintained support for Philippine military campaigns against the Hukbalahap. During the Hukbalahap rebellion the United States also supported land reforms to reduce potential attraction to communism, although this pressure subsided as the rebellion ceased.

When Marcos declared martial law, to muted American response and with general acquiescence, the strategic value of the Philippines and its American military bases led to continued official support. While the United States eventually pressured Marcos to bring back elections, such support enabled Marcos to stay in power even as civil society and the military began to turn against him. Eventually, the United States supported the development of an anti-Marcos coalition, and in 1989 intervened to halt a coup against the new Aquino government.

The influence of the United States decreased in the 1990s, when agreements to host American military bases ended and the country increased the regional aspects of its foreign policy. Following the September 11 attacks in the United States, security ties deepened once more, as the Moro insurgency became linked with the global war on terror. This growing cooperation included the limited return of some US forces to Philippine soil.

== History ==
=== Pre-independence ===
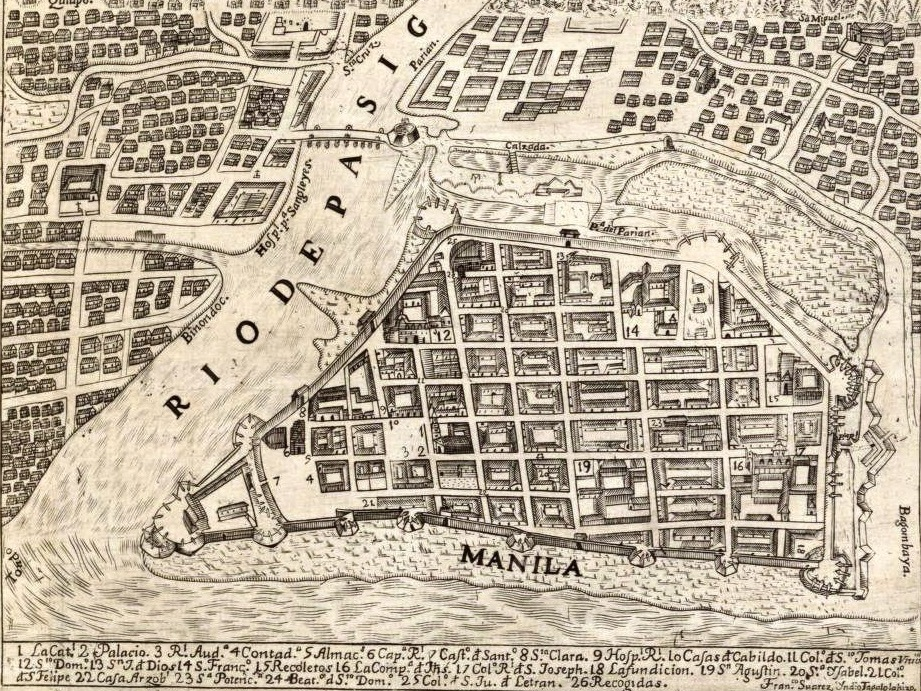
The Spanish established Manila as the capital of the Captaincy General of the Philippines.

Before the onset of Spanish rule in the 16th century, the Philippines was split into numerous barangays, which were small entities while being part of region-wide trade networks. The arrival of Hindu influence increased the power of Indianized datus. The first large state was Sulu, which adopted Islam in the 15th century. Spanish Captain-General Miguel López de Legazpi established a settlement in Cebu in 1565. Maynila was conquered in 1571, and Manila subsequently became the center of Spanish administration.

Spain gradually conquered the majority of the modern Philippines, although full control was never established over some Muslims areas in the south and in the Cordillera highlands. In the 19th century Spain eventually gained control over the seas and coasts. Inward migration in the Cordilleras to escape Spanish control and an increase in trade saw settlements in interior areas increase in population and political complexity. Throughout Spanish rule, the archipelago remained divided by regional identity and language.

Rule during the Spanish era was dominated by the church, especially friars. Ultimate power was held by the King and the Council of the Indies, with the Philippines being part of New Spain, although the islands functioned practically autonomously. The Philippines had their own Governor and a judicial body was established in 1583. Direct Spanish rule did not extend far from Manila, and locals were relied upon for administration. Traditional native elites, along with some native officeholders and high-value tax payers, became part of a group known as the principalia. Over time, this elite class became more culturally distinct, gaining an education unavailable to most and intermarrying with Spanish officials and Chinese merchants.

In the 19th century, Philippine ports opened to world trade and shifts started occurring within Filipino society. An expanding civil service and a changing economy saw more complex social structures emerge with new upper and middle classes. The Latin American wars of independence and renewed immigration led to shifts in social identity, with the term Filipino shifting from referring to Spaniards born in the Iberian Peninsula and in the Philippines to a term encompassing all people in the archipelago. This identity shift was driven by wealthy families of mixed ancestry, for which it developed into a national identity. A class of educated individuals became known as the Ilustrados. This group gained prominence in Philippine administration, and became increasingly involved in politics.

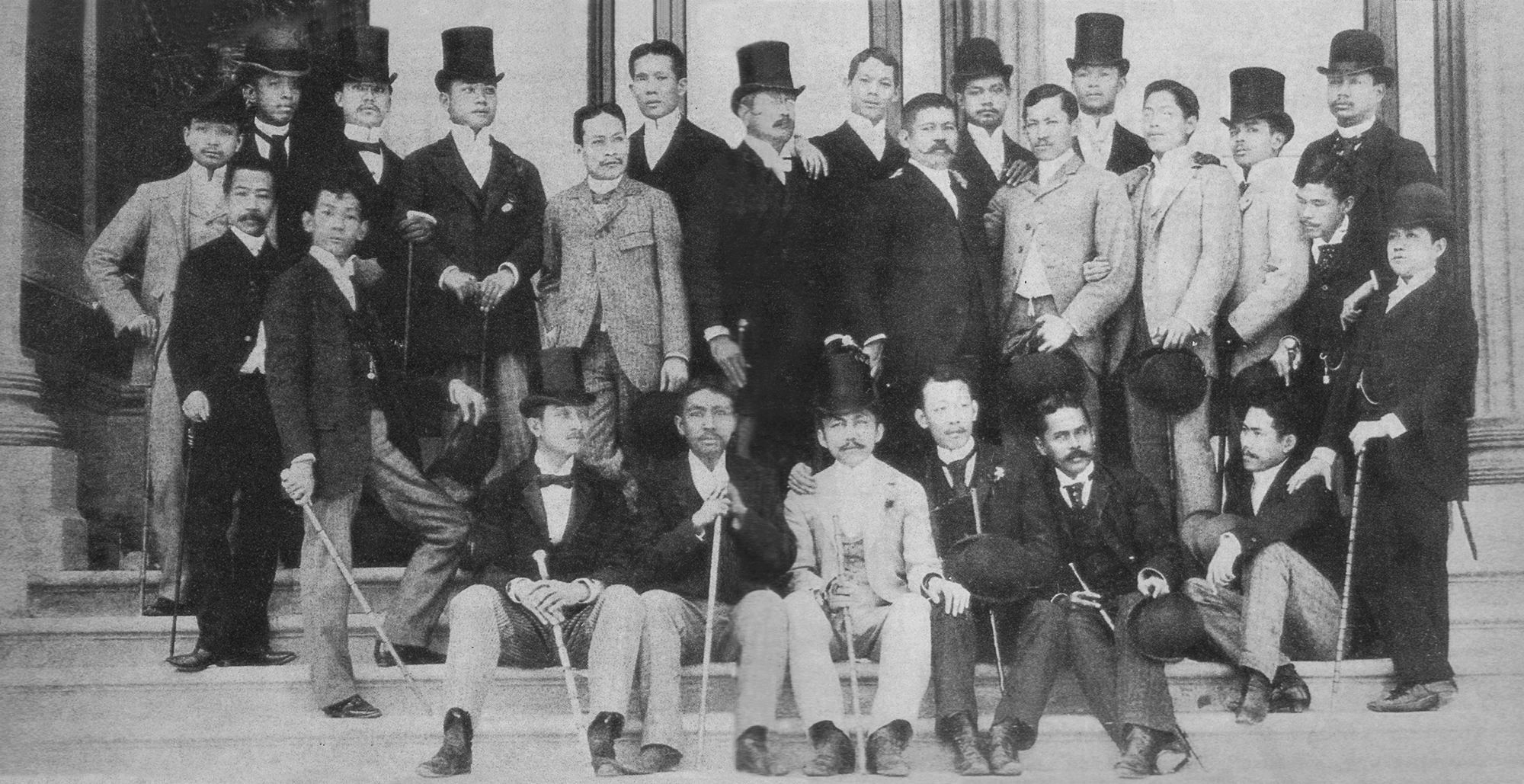
The Ilustrados in Madrid, c. 1890

In the 1880s, some prominent Ilustrados launched the Propaganda Movement. For the most part this was a campaign for secular self-government as a full part of Spain, but as proposed liberal reforms were rejected, some saw the movement as the beginning of a national awakening. In 1892 the Katipunan split from the movement, led by members of Manila's urban middle class. The Katipunan advocated complete Philippine independence, and began the Philippine Revolution in 1896. The Spanish–American war reached the Philippines on May 1 with the Battle of Manila Bay.

The Katipunan, under Emilio Aguinaldo,proclaimed the independence of the Philippines on June 12, 1898. Aguinaldo proclaimed a dictatorial government on June 18, recast it as a revolutionary government on June 23, and convened a congress at Malolos, Bulucan on September 15. The Malolos Constitution was promulgated on January 21, 1899, creating the Firast Philippine Republic.

Spain retained sovereignty, however, and the ceded the Philippines to the United States in 1898. The Philippine–American War erupted in February 1899 in a skirmish in Manila. Aguinaldo was captured on April 1, 1901. The Americans gave Filipinos limited self-government at the local level by 1901. The hierarchical social structure that existed under Spanish rule was co-opted by the United States, with democracy introduced in a manner which did not threaten the power of the existing elites. Local elites were entrenched into the national system.

The first election of the Philippine Assembly in 1907 was won by the independence-supporting Nacionalista Party, led by Sergio Osmeña. The Nacionalista party would maintain electoral dominance until independence. In some rural areas opposition to American rule persisted among the poorer population, and the development of class consciousness-based political organization led to peasant revolts in the 1930s. American forces extended their control over the entirety of the islands, securing the Sultanate of Sulu and establishing control over interior mountainous areas. The Philippine government pursued a policy of gradually strengthening government in Mindanao, supported by immigration from Christian areas. Despite this, the traditional political structures of Sultanates and Datus continued as a parallel political structure.

The 1916 Jones Law envisioned eventual Philippine independence. The Nacionalista-dominated legislature grew more powerful, seizing state bodies and using nationalism to weaken American oversight. The establishment of the senate led to the Nacionalistas forming opposing camps loyal to Osmeña (the Unipersonalistas) and Senate President Manuel L. Quezon (the Colectavistas). The 1934 Tydings–McDuffie Act paved the way for the Commonwealth of the Philippines and mandated U.S. recognition of independence of the Philippine Islands after a ten-year transition period.

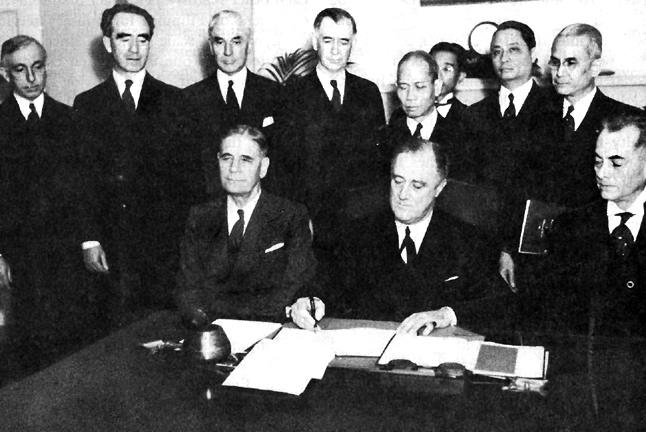
United States President Franklin D. Roosevelt signs the 1935 Constitution of the Philippines in the presence of then Philippine Senate President Manuel L. Quezon.

Quezon and Osmeña were elected as president and vice president, respectively, in 1935. In 1937 the voting franchise was expanded to include literate women. A national curriculum similarly sought to impose a single vision of a Filipino identity across the diverse ethnolinguistic groups of the islands, and Tagalog was established as a national language. Treatment of the Commonwealth by the United States was inconsistent: sometimes it was treated as a separate country, sometimes as under US jurisdiction. The presidential system of the Commonwealth government was based on that of the United States. However, while dividing power between three branches similarly to the constitution of the United States, the 1935 constitution gave the Philippine president significantly more power both politically and economically than that accorded to the president of the United States.

The Japanese invasion of 1941 at the onset of World War II forced the Commonwealth government to go into exile, and subjected the country to a puppet government. The KALIBAPI became the sole legal political party, and Jose P. Laurel was declared president of an independent Second Philippine Republic. In rural areas, a sudden vacuum of elite power led to the formation of new local governments by the remaining populace, beginning the Hukbalahap Rebellion. The Americans reconquered the Philippines in 1944, and Osmeña, who had succeeded Quezon upon the latter's death, restored the Commonwealth government.

The Nacionalistas were divided following the war, with a leadership struggle leading to Manuel Roxas setting up what would later be the Liberal Party. Roxas defeated Osmeña in the 1946 presidential election, and became the last president of the Commonwealth. A left-wing political movement that spawned from the Hukbalahap fight against the Japanese was suppressed by the former elite with American support, leading to the continuation of the rebellion against the new government.

=== Independence ===
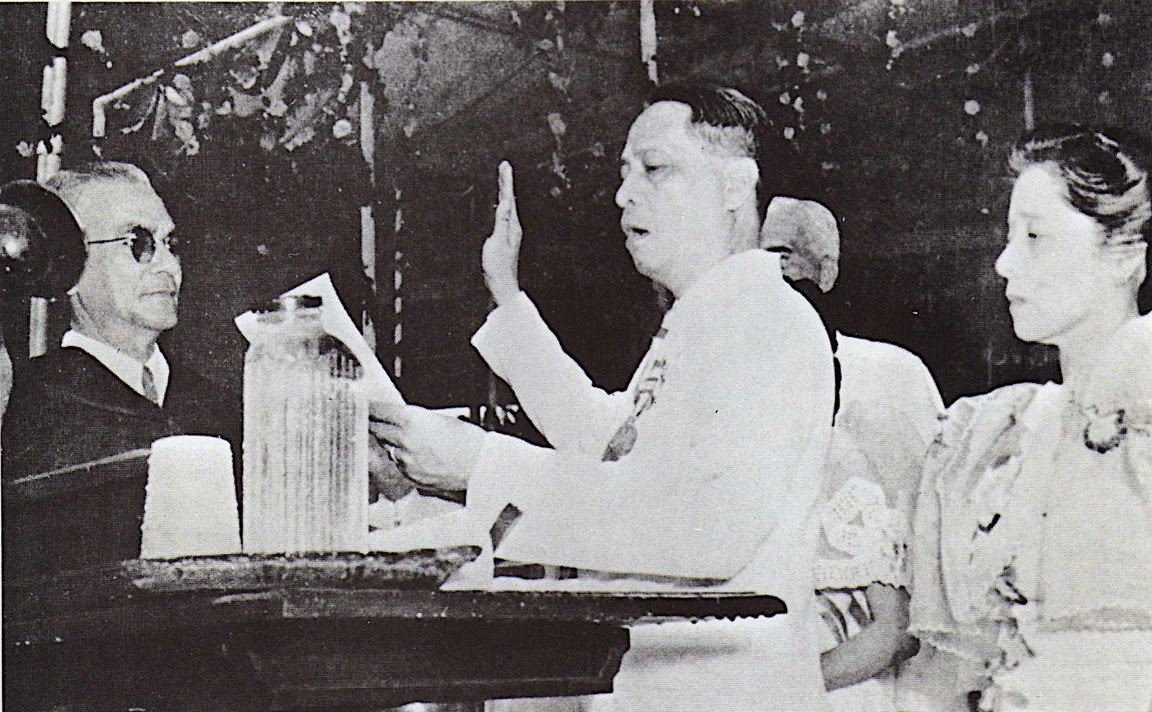
President Manuel Roxas' inauguration as the first president of an independent Philippines

The Americans granted independence on July 4, 1946, and Roxas became the first president of the new Republic of the Philippines.

The impact of the war led to a weaker civil service and a reduction in the dominance of Manila, with provincial politicians gaining political power and in some cases de facto autonomy. Many leveraged their provincial power to engage in national politics. Universal suffrage saw an expansion of voter participation, although power remained concentrated in the hands of a small elite. A diversifying post-war economy largely brought an end to the land-based cacique democracy patronage system. Political offices became lucrative by themselves, and patronage became more reliant on access to government funds. These changes did not shift the overall shape of Filipino politics, which remained a two-party system dominated by a narrow elite. There was little policy difference between the parties.

Roxas suffered a fatal heart attack in 1948, allowing Vice President Elpidio Quirino to rule the country for the next six years. Quirino sought to significantly expand executive power. Quirino's Liberal government was widely seen as corrupt and was easily beaten by his former Defense secretary Ramon Magsaysay in 1953. Magsaysay, who oversaw the surrender of the long-running Hukbalahap Rebellion, was massively popular. Magsaysay implemented a plan to settle surrendered Hukbalahap rebels in Mindanao, cementing a demographic shift in Mindanao from a Muslim to a Christian majority.

Before the 1957 election, Magsaysay was killed in a plane crash. His vice president, Carlos P. Garcia, succeeded him and won the election. He continued Magsaysay's "Filipino First" policy and implemented an austerity program. Garcia was defeated by his vice president, Diosdado Macapagal of the Liberal Party, in 1961. Macapagal initiated a return to a system of free enterprise, and sought land reform and electrification. Macapagal was defeated in 1965 by Senator Ferdinand Marcos.

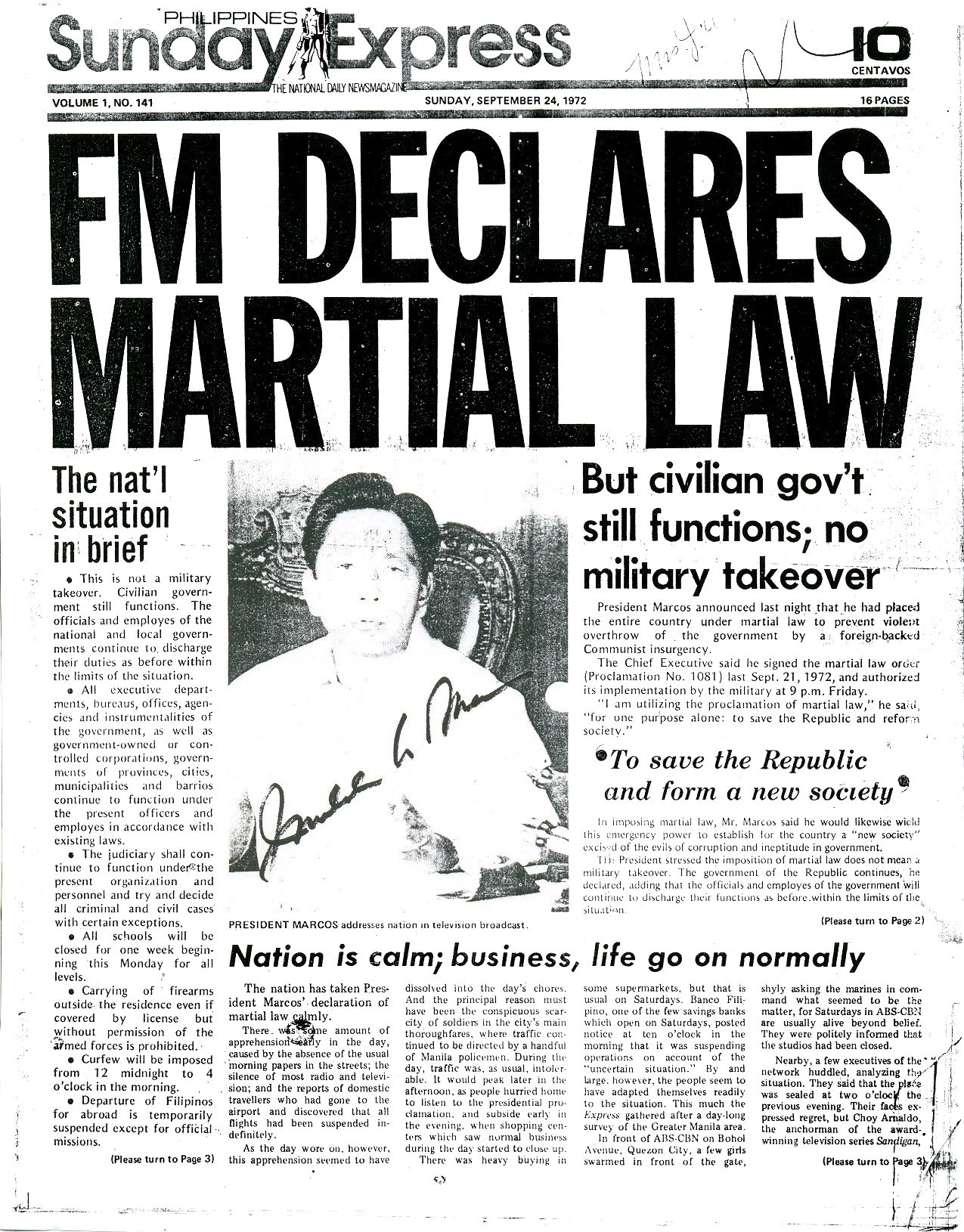
President Ferdinand Marcos declares martial law.

The growing and diversifying economy of the 1960s led to a growth in private business power and an expansion in mass media. Marcos was the first president to be re-elected, in 1969, although the election was tainted by violence and allegations of fraud and vote buying. Civil unrest heightened after the election. Communist rebellion strengthened during Marcos' rule, and a Moro insurgency emerged in Mindanao. Marcos declared martial law in 1972.

Attempts to end the war in Mindanao led Marcos to recognize Islamic holidays, introduce a code of Muslim personal laws, and formally recognize a number of sultans in Mindanao and Sulu. Marcos framed his government as fighting against the rich landed elite that traditionally dominated politics. He relied on the growing technocratic civil service, who were receptive to such arguments, to effectively run the country under martial law. Marcos also relied on the military, which gained increased power and resources during the martial law period. A constitutional convention finalized a new constitution in November 1972, which introduced a semi-presidential system.

Marcos continued to rule by decree without elections until 1978, when the Interim Batasang Pambansa (IBP) legislature was elected. Marcos had complete control over the bureaucracy, local governments, military, the press, and COMELEC. The 1978 parliamentary and the 1980 local elections were dominated by Marcos' Kilusang Bagong Lipunan party. The unicameral IBP had little real power. The Supreme Court affirmed the expansive executive powers claimed under martial law. Marcos laid out a vision of a "new society", which would represent an end to old oligarchies.

Some political dynasties who were not Marcos allies were stripped of assets and power, in many cases replaced in local politics by Marcos allies. Marcos ended martial law in 1981, shortly before a visit to the Philippines by Pope John Paul II, although he retained immense executive powers. Opposition groups still boycotted the 1981 presidential election, which Marcos easily won. Opposition leader Benigno Aquino Jr. was slain upon his return to the Philippines in 1983.

By this time, the government was marred by a weak economy, rampant corruption, and a loss of political support. A united opposition participated in the 1984 parliamentary election, making gains. A snap election saw the opposition nominate Benigno's widow Corazon as their candidate. Marcos was declared the winner of the 1986 election, but the opposition refused to accept the result, alleging that the election was rigged. The People Power Revolution drove Marcos from power, and Aquino became president.

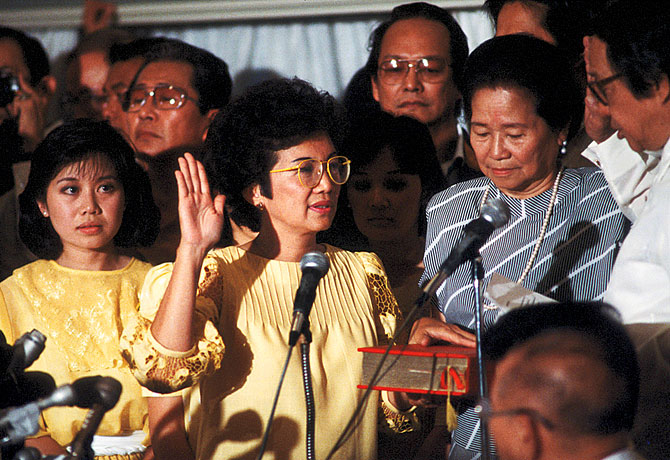
Corazon Aquino was inaugurated president on February 25, 1986; it was one of two presidential inaugurations that day.

The 1987 constitution restored democracy along the lines of the 1935 constitution. The new constitution introduced some elements of direct democracy. The 1988 local elections saw the traditional elite recapturing local political office. Aquino's government was mired by coup attempts, and saw continued rebellions by communists and Islamic separatists. In 1991, a new Local Government Code shifted some power and resources to lower levels of government.

Aquino did not wish to run for election again, and leading up to the 1992 presidential election she supported Fidel V. Ramos, who had left her party to form his own. Ramos won, albeit under controversial circumstances and allegations of electoral fraud. The 1992 elections were the first to be synchronized, with presidential, legislative, and local elections held simultaneously. With the 1997 Asian financial crisis damaging the image of economy liberalism, and with no clear successor to Ramos, Ramos's vice president Joseph Estrada won the 1998 election with a comfortable margin on a populist campaign appealing directly to poorer voters.

The Estrada administration was embroiled in charges of cronyism and corruption, leading to his impeachment by the House of Representatives. In the impeachment trial, Estrada's allies in the Senate successfully prevented evidence to be presented, triggering massive protests. The military withdrew their support from Estrada and transferred their allegiance to Vice President Arroyo; the Supreme Court later ruled the presidency as vacant, and Estrada left Malacañang Palace.

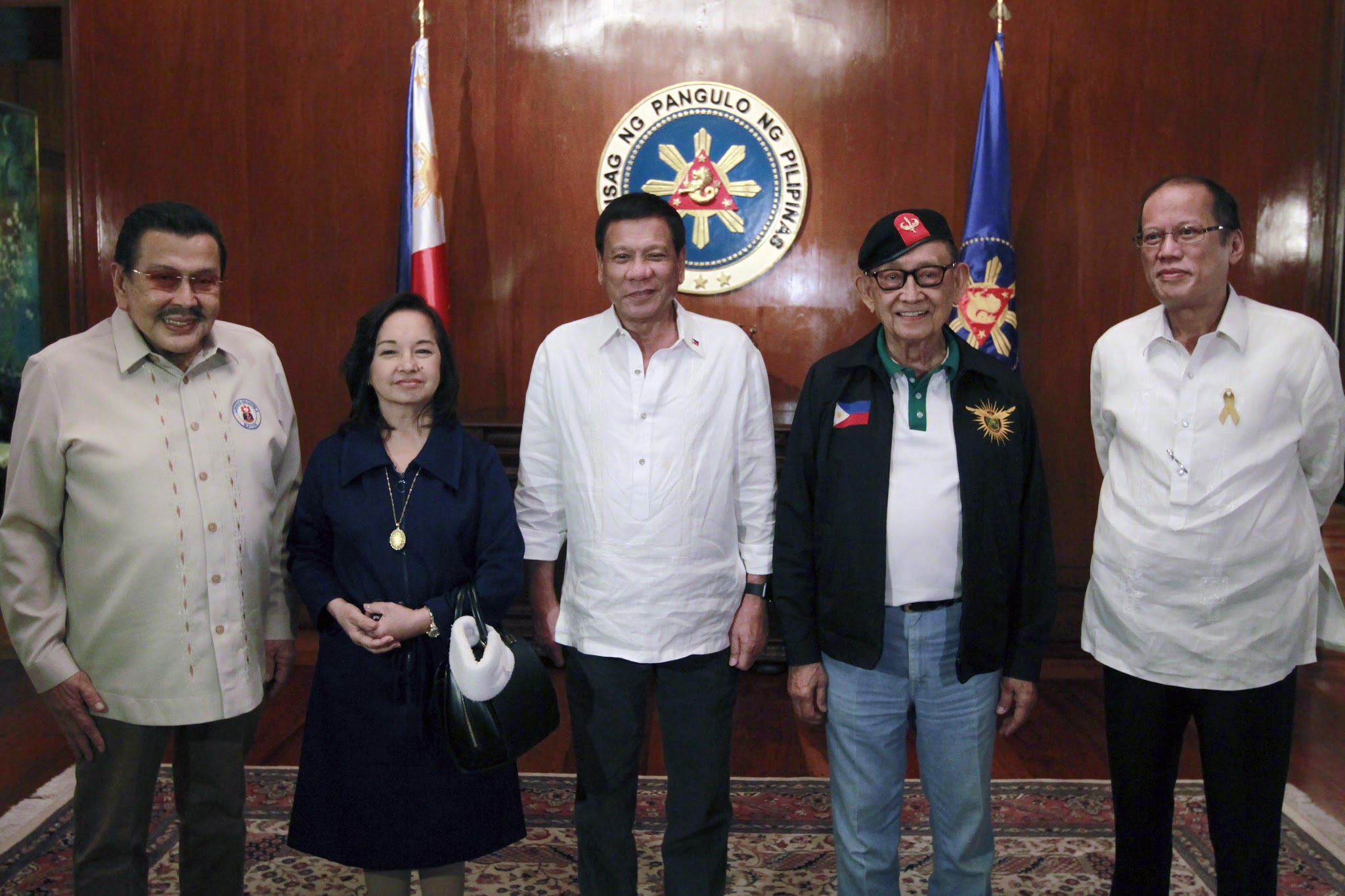
Presidents Joseph Estrada, Gloria Macapagal Arroyo, Rodrigo Duterte, Fidel V. Ramos, and Benigno Aquino III

Arroyo was sworn in as president on January 20, 2001. Estrada's supporters launched their own mass movement, which was ultimately unsuccessful. Arroyo's People Power Coalition won a majority of seats in the 2001 elections and therefore consolidated power. In 2003, a failed coup attempt took place in the central business district. As she had served less than four years as president, Arroyo was eligible for re-election. She won the 2004 election with a slim plurality. It was later exposed that Arroyo rigged the election. This second term saw another coup attempt. By the end of her presidency, Arroyo was the most unpopular president since the 1986 People Power Revolution.

Before the 2010 election, former president Aquino died, and her son, Benigno Aquino III, won the election. His administration was politically stable, seen as relatively clean, and had the highest ratings since Marcos. While his popularity dipped towards the end of his administration, it was linked to perceptions about the failure of change within the wider political system, rather than to Aquino himself. In the 2016 presidential election, Aquino's handpicked successor was decisively defeated by Davao City mayor Rodrigo Duterte.

Duterte ran on a populist platform, winning votes from various socioeconomic classes, with particularly strong appeal to the middle classes. Duterte implemented a war on drugs that led to thousands of deaths. Duterte then prioritized infrastructure spending, and sought to end the communist insurgency. The administration made peace with the Moro Islamic Liberation Front, replacing the ARMM with the more powerful Bangsamoro region. The Duterte government has largely continued Aquino's economic policies, including those focused on the poor. Its political policies have shown a shift towards illiberal democracy, with the politicization of legal institutions and less regard for checks and balances.

In May 2022, Ferdinand Marcos Jr (known by his nickname "Bongbong"), son of former president Ferdinand Marcos, received nearly 59 percent of the vote and won the presidential election by landslide. His vice presidential candidate was Sara Duterte, daughter of then-president Rodrigo Duterte. On 30 June 2022, Marcos was sworn in as the Philippine president and Sara Duterte was sworn in as vice-president.

== See also ==
- Censorship in the Philippines
- Sovereignty of the Philippines
