= Yakan language =

Austronesian language spoken in Philippines

Yakan
- Bissā Yakan; Bahasa Yakan
- Native to: Philippines
- Region: Basilan and parts of Zamboanga Peninsula
- Ethnicity: Yakan
- Native speakers: (110,000 cited 1990 census)
- Language family: Austronesian: Malayo-Polynesian; Sama-Bajaw; Yakan
- Writing system: Latin; Jawi

Official status
- Official language in: Regional language in the Philippines
- Regulated by: Komisyon sa Wikang Filipino

Language codes
- ISO 639-3: yka
- Glottolog: yaka1277
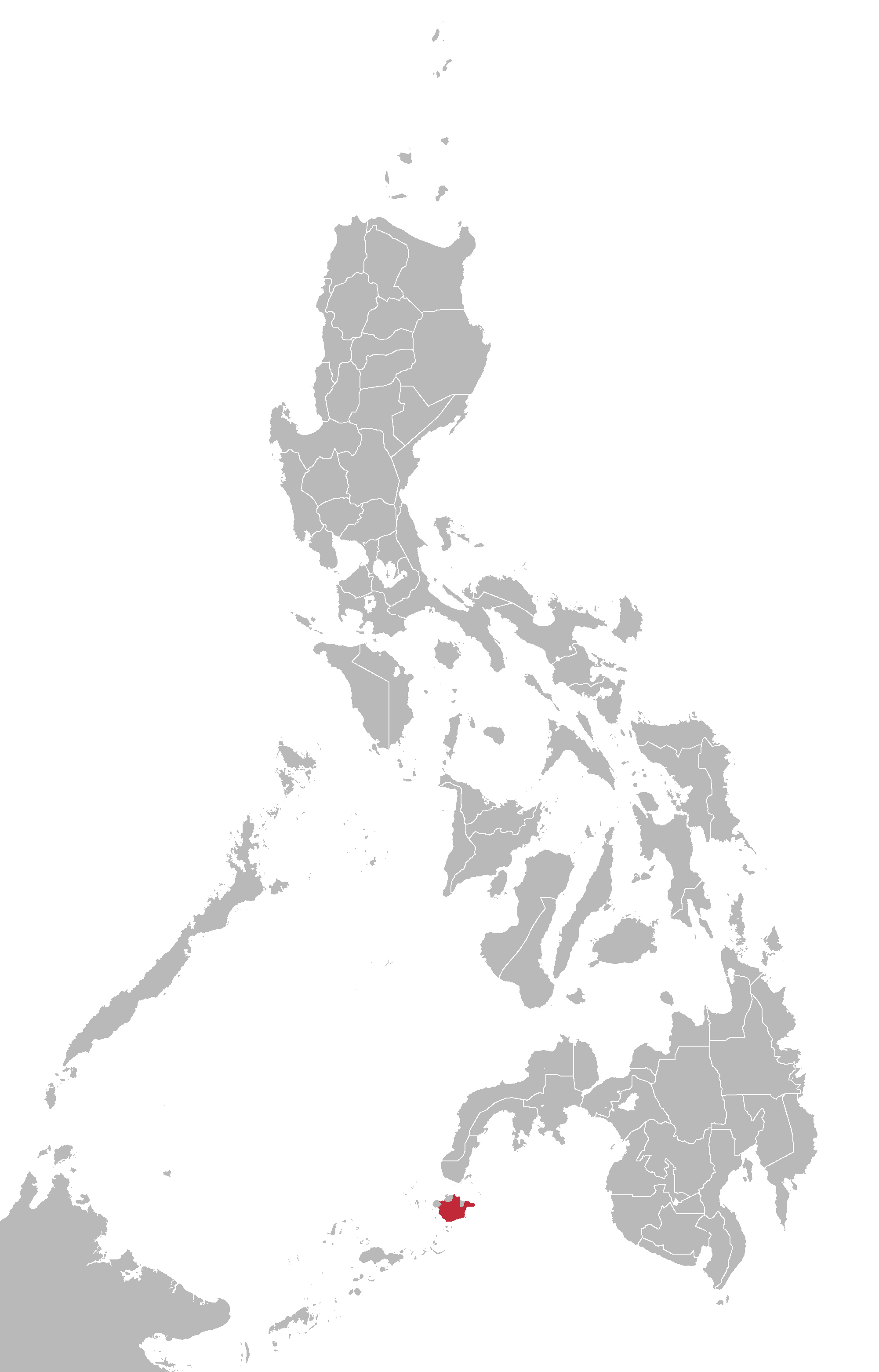
- Area where Yakan is spoken

Yakan is an Austronesian language primarily spoken in Basilan in the Philippines. It is the native language of the Yakan people, the indigenous as well as the largest ethnic group on the island. It has a total of 110,000 native speakers. Despite being located in the Philippines, it is not closely related to other languages of the country. It is a member of the Sama-Bajaw languages, which in turn are related to the Barito languages spoken in southern Borneo, Madagascar and Mayotte.

== Phonology ==
=== Vowels ===
Yakan has a simple five-vowel system: [a], [e], [i], [o], [u], with phonemic vowel length: ⟨ā⟩ [aː], ⟨ē⟩ [eː], ⟨ī⟩ [iː], ⟨ō⟩ [oː], ⟨ū⟩ [uː].

=== Consonants ===
The following chart lists the consonant phonemes of Yakan.

		Labial	Alveolar	Palatal/ postalveolar	Velar	Glottal
Nasal		m	n		ŋ	
Plosive	voiceless	p	t		k	ʔ
Plosive	voiced	b	d		ɡ	
Affricate				d͡ʒ		
Fricative			s			h
Semivowel				j	w	
Lateral			l			

The consonant d is usually realized between vowels as a flap [ɾ], although some speakers use the stop [d] in all positions.

All consonants except for /d͡ʒ/, /h/, /j/, /w/ and /ʔ/ can occur as lengthened consonants.

The following spelling conventions are used: ⟨y⟩ /j/, ⟨j⟩ /d͡ʒ/, ⟨ng⟩ /ŋ/, ⟨'⟩ /ʔ/.

== Bibliography ==
- Brainard, Sherri; Behrens, Dietlinde (2002). A Grammar of Yakan. Manila: Linguistic Society of the Philippines.
