= Mujiv Hataman =

Filipino politician (born 1972)

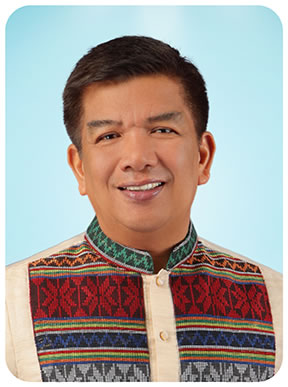
- Official portrait, 2022

Governor of Basilan
- Incumbent
- Assumed office June 30, 2025
- Vice Governor: Hadjiman Hataman Salliman
- Preceded by: Hadjiman Hataman Salliman

6th Governor of the Autonomous Region in Muslim Mindanao
- In office December 22, 2011 – February 26, 2019 (Note: Served in acting capacity from December 22, 2011 to June 30, 2013.)
- Vice Governor: Haroun Al-Rashid Lucman II
- Preceded by: Ansaruddin Alonto Adiong (acting)
- Succeeded by: Murad Ebrahim (as Chief Minister)
House positions
Deputy Speaker of the House of Representatives of the Philippines
In office August 13, 2019 – June 1, 2022 Serving with several others
House Speaker	Alan Peter Cayetano; Lord Allan Velasco
Member of the House of Representatives for Anak Mindanao
In office June 30, 2001 – June 30, 2010 Serving with Ariel C. Hernandez (2009–2010)
Succeeded by	Sitti Turabin Hataman (2013)
Member of the House of Representatives from Basilan's lone district
In office June 30, 2019 – June 30, 2025
Preceded by	Jum Jainudin Akbar
Succeeded by	Yusop Alano

Personal details
- Born: Mujiv Sabbihi Hataman; September 11, 1972 (age 54) Sumisip, Basilan, Philippines
- Party: Liberal (2010–present); BUP (local party; 2021–present)
- Other political affiliations: Anak Mindanao (partylist; 2001–2010)
- Spouse: Sitty Djalia Turabin
- Education: AMA Computer University (BS)

Mujiv Sabbihi Hataman (born September 11, 1972) is a Filipino politician and indigenous people's rights advocate from the Yakan people of the Sulu Archipelago. He served as the sixth and last regional governor of the Autonomous Region in Muslim Mindanao (ARMM) from 2011 until it was replaced by the Bangsamoro Autonomous Region in Muslim Mindanao (BARMM) in 2019.

He previously served as the party-list representative of Anak Mindanao from 2001 to 2010. From 2019 to 2025, he served as the representative of Basilan's lone district and was a House deputy speaker from 2019 to 2022. On July 10, 2020, he was one of the 11 representatives who voted to grant the franchise renewal of ABS-CBN.

== Early life and education ==
Hataman was born on September 11, 1972, in Buli-Buli, Sumisip, Basilan. He came from an influential family. His grandfather is the Panglima or leader of Yakan in Sumisip while his father was the barangay captain of Sumisip when it was still a barangay. He completed his primary studies at Buli-Buli Elementary School in Sumisip in March 1986 and secondary studies at Basilan National High School in 1990. He graduated with a degree in Computer Engineering at AMA Computer College (now AMA Computer University), where he was the leader of the Muslim Youth and Students Alliance.

== Early political career ==
=== Relationship with Wahab Akbar ===
Hataman started as an ally of former Basilan governor Wahab Akbar; he served as Akbar's chief of staff while he was Governor, and in 2001 was supported as the main party-list Anak-Mindanao candidate to the House of Representatives. Under the party-list system, an underrepresented group or party can obtain one House seat for every two percent that it gets of the party-list votes, with a maximum of three. AMIN achieved the minimum threshold despite election irregularities that nullified some of its votes, but the Supreme Court then issued a temporary restraining order that prevented the party-list representatives from being sworn in. Mujiv served as spokesperson for AMIN in the intervening period. After a two-year delay, the Supreme Court in July 2003 lifted the order and he was finally installed as a representative from Basilan at age 30.

Being a human rights advocate, Hataman opposed Gov. Akbar's implementation of indiscriminate warrantless arrests in Basilan. This started the disagreement between the two. This angered Gov. Akbar that ultimately lead to the falling out of the two.

=== Accusations in Akbar assassination ===
Captured suspect and former Tuburan town mayor Hajuron Jamiri accused both Mujiv and his brother Jim as being the masterminds of the November 2007 bombing at the House of Representatives that killed four people including Wahab Akbar. Jamiri claimed in a two-page affidavit that Mujiv and Jim wanted Akbar dead because Basilan would "not be at peace" under his administration.

The Hataman brothers denied the allegations, however, and Jimiri's statement was eventually retracted. Mujiv claimed that Jimiri had been tortured and that his "confession" came under duress. Fellow conspirator Ikram Indama likewise later claimed that Salapudin, Bayan Judda, Caidar Aunal, Adham Kusain, Jang Hataman, Jim Hataman and Mujiv Hataman were all not involved in the Batasan blast, and that he was forced by the Akbars to admit to the bombing and to implicate the others.

== Regional Governor of the Autonomous Region in Muslim Mindanao ==
=== Officer-In-Charge of ARMM ===
On December 22, 2011, due to the "Reform Programs" of President Benigno Aquino III Congressman Hataman was appointed as Officer-In-Charge of the Autonomous Region in Muslim Mindanao. The move was criticized by many as Hataman was not a member of the Regional Legislative Assembly. Under Republic Act No. 10153, the President has given authority to appoint Officers In Charge while the Regional Election, originally scheduled August 8, 2011, was postponed until the general election on May 12, 2013.

=== Full term as ARMM Governor ===
During his assumption as OIC-Regional Governor, Hataman announce that he will not run as Regional Governor to focus on his reform programs. But months before the filing of candidacy for 2013 election he was convinced by many cause oriented groups in Mindanao to pursue for a new mandate.

Finally, after being convinced by different Civil Society groups Hataman ran for Regional Governor of ARMM, with DILG-ARMM Regional Secretary Al-Rasheed "Momoy" Lucman as his running mate.

He ran under the administration Liberal Party against former Regional Governor Nur Misuari, Sultan Kudarat Governor Pax Mungudadatu and 3 other independent candidates. He won in a landslide victory with 232,253 votes.

When the ARMM was abolished and the Bangsamoro Autonomous Region established in its place, the Bangsamoro Transition Authority (BTA) was instituted as an interim regional government body. As per law, Hataman as Regional Governor of the ARMM at the time of the region's abolishment automatically becomes a member of the BTA but opted against joining the interim body so he could focus on pursuing local humanitarian and security programs in his home province of Basilan.

=== Cabinet ===
The Hataman Cabinet
Office	Name	Term
Regional Governor of the Autonomous Region in Muslim Mindanao	Mujiv Sabbihi Hataman	December 22, 2011 – February 26, 2019
Regional Vice-Governor Autonomous Region in Muslim Mindanao	Al-Rasheed Lucman	June 30, 2013 – July 31, 2016
Executive Secretary	Laisa Alamia
Chief of Staff	Rasul Mitmug, Jr.
Cabinet Secretary	Khal Mambuay
Regional Secretary of Agrarian Reform	Amilhilda Sangcopan
Regional Secretary of Agriculture	Macmod Mending
Regional Secretary of Education	John Magno
Regional Secretary of Environment and Natural Resources	Kahal Kedtag
Regional Administrator of Cooperative Development	Dimnatang Radia
Regional Secretary of Health	Kadil Sinolinding
Regional Secretary of the Interior and Local Government	Abdullah "Kirby" Matalam
Regional Secretary of Labor and Employment	Muslimin Jakilan
Regional Secretary of Public Works and Highways	Don Mustapha Arbison Loong
Regional Secretary of Science and Technology	Myra Alih
Regional Secretary of Social Welfare and Development	Al Rasheed Alonto Lucman
Regional Secretary of Tourism	Jehan Mutin Macapuno
Regional Secretary of Trade and Industry	Anwar Malang
Executive Director of Transportation and Communications	Pama Dimapanat
Regional Chairperson of the Commission on Higher Education	Norma Sharif

== House of Representatives ==
Since 2019, Hataman has been serving as the representative of Basilan's lone district. He served as a House Deputy Speaker from 2019 until 2022. In 2022, he joined the minority bloc and was named as a deputy minority leader.

=== Notable house votes ===
On July 10, 2020, he was one of the 11 representatives who voted to grant the franchise renewal of ABS-CBN.

== Governor of Basilan ==
Hataman was elected governor of Basilan in the 2025 Philippine general election, defeating his nephew, Jay Hataman Salliman. One of his first acts in office was banning his name and image from being used in official projects.

== Human rights advocacy ==
Mujiv served as a program coordinator of the Kahapan Foundation—Moro Human Rights Center (Kahapan-MHRC). When he was elected to Congress, he sponsored the Anti-Discrimination Bill, which affirmed the International Convention against All form of Racial Discrimination.

== Wealth ==
In a 2004 Philippine Daily Inquirer report, Hataman was cited as one of the "poorest" congressmen serving in the House of Representatives, with a net worth of only ₱420,000 (equivalent to ₱791,219 in 2021). The same report noted that out of 225 members of the House, only six were not millionaires, with the richest worth upward of ₱500 million. By 2006, his net worth had increased to ₱690,000 (equivalent to ₱1,156,225 in 2021), but was still in the bottom tenth.

=== Family business involvement ===
According to a BusinessWorld article, Hataman in 2004 started a company with his brother that distributes fresh fish from Mindanao to businesses in Manila. He said the business is not his, but that of his brother and a brother-in-law, and he only shares his managerial and marketing expertise. The business started with only ₱20,000 (equivalent to ₱37,677 in 2021) in capital and now earns ₱30,000 to ₱40,000 a month. His distribution network includes wet markets in Manila and Quezon City.

== Hataman political bloc ==
The Hatamans and their allies constitute one of the powerful familial political blocs of Basilan, and frequently come in conflict with the Akbar family in competing for elected office. Frequently this conflict turns violent; in December 2008, two of Mujiv's cousins were shot dead in an attack, and Mujiv was one of several politicians accused in Akbar's assassination in November 2007.

His two brothers are also influential politicians; older brother Hadjiman "Jim" Hataman was the former representative from the lone district of Basilan, and younger brother "Boy" Hataman was previously mayor of Sumisip. Together, the Hataman brothers constitute a powerful political bloc in Basilan. Former Lamitan mayor, Roderick Furigay is considered one of their allies. Gerry Salapuddin was also an ally, but they may have had a falling out after the accusations associated with the Akbar assassination.

== Personal life ==
Hataman is from the Yakan ethnic group. He is married to Sitti Djalia Turabin.

On August 1, 2020, Hataman and his wife announced that they had contracted COVID-19.

== Electoral history ==
Electoral history of Mujiv Hataman
Year	Office	Party		Votes received				Result
Year	Office	Local	National	Total	%	P.	Swing	Result
2001	Representative (Party-list)	AMIN		252,051	3.86%	7th	—N/a	Won
2004	Representative (Party-list)	AMIN		269,750	2.12%	14th	-1.74	Won
2007	Representative (Party-list)	AMIN		347,527	2.17%	14th	+0.05	Won
2019	Representative (Basilan)	—N/a	Liberal	121,901	81.08%	1st	—N/a	Won
2022	Representative (Basilan)	BUP	Liberal	133,784	68.04%	1st	-13.04	Won
2013	Governor of ARMM	—N/a	Liberal	232,253	59.30%	1st	—N/a	Won
2016	Governor of ARMM	—N/a	Liberal	875,200	70.16%	1st	+10.86	Won
2025	Governor of Basilan	BUP	Liberal	121,829	50.50%	1st	—N/a	Won

== Notes ==
Political offices
Preceded by Hadjiman Hataman Salliman	Governor of Basilan; 2025–present	Incumbent
Preceded by Ansaruddin Alonto Adiong as Acting Governor of the Autonomous Region in Muslim Mindanao	Governor of the Autonomous Region in Muslim Mindanao; 2011–2019	Office abolished
House of Representatives of the Philippines
New office	Member of the Philippine House of Representatives from Anak Mindanao; 2001–2010; Served alongside: Ariel C. Hernandez (2009–2010)	Vacant Title next held by Sitti Djalia Hataman; 2013
Preceded by Jum Jainudin Akbar	Member of the Philippine House of Representatives from Basilan's At-large district 2019–2025	Succeeded by Yusop T. Alano
