= Sitti Djalia Hataman =

Filipina politician

Sitti Turabin Hataman

Mayor of Isabela, Basilan
- Incumbent
- Assumed office 30 June 2019
- Vice Mayor: Jhul Kifli L. Salliman
- Preceded by: Cherrylyn Akbar

Member of the Philippine House of Representatives for Anak Mindanao party-list
- In office 30 June 2013 – 1 October 2017
- Preceded by: Mujiv Hataman (2010)
- Succeeded by: Amihilda Sangcopan

Executive Director of the National Commission on Muslim Filipinos
- In office 2010–?
- President: Benigno Aquino III

Personal details
- Born: Sitti Djalia Turabin; 26 November 1977 (age 48) Basilan, Philippines
- Party: Liberal (2018–present); BUP (local party; 2021–present)
- Other political affiliations: Anak Mindanao (partylist; 2012–2018)
- Spouse: Mujiv Hataman
- Profession: Human right activist Politician

Sitti Djalia Turabin Hataman (born 26 November 1977) is a Filipina politician serving as the mayor of Isabela, Basilan since 2019. She previously served as the Party-list Representative of Anak Mindanao and was the executive director of the National Commission on Muslim Filipinos.

== Background ==
Sitti is the wife of politician Mujiv Hataman.

== Political activities ==
Sitti served as director (or Secretary General) of the Moro Human Rights Center, as of at least 2002, and President of Pinay Kilos (PINK), since at least 2007. She has focused advocacy on the plight of families in conflict areas of Sulu and Basilan in Mindanao. She resigned as Anak Mindanao party-list Congress representative in 2017.
