= Governor of Basilan =

Local chief executive

Provincial Governor of Basilan
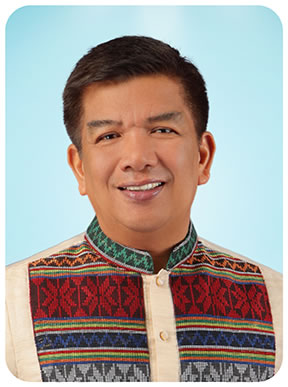
- Incumbent; Mujiv Hataman since June 30, 2025
- Appointer: Elected via popular vote
- Term length: 3 years
- Inaugural holder: Tomas Nanquil
- Formation: 1973

The governor of Basilan (Filipino: Punong Panlalawigan ng Basilan), is the chief executive of the provincial government of Basilan.

== Military Governors (1973-1975) ==
	Governor
1	Col. Tomas Nanquil Jr.
2	Rear Adm. Romulo Espaldon

== Civilian Governors (1975-present) ==
No.	Image	Governor	Term
1		Asan G. Camlian	1975-1986
2		Louis W. Alano	1986-1988
3		Abdulgani A. Salapuddin	1988-1998
4		Wahab M. Akbar	1998-2007
5		Jum Jainudin Akbar	2007-2016
6		Hadjiman Hataman Salliman	2016-2025
7		Mujiv Hataman	2025-present
