= Anak Mindanao =

Political party in the Philippines

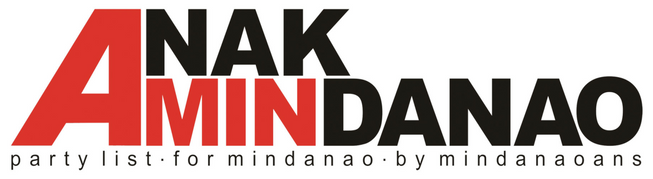
- Founded: 1997
- Ideology: Mindanao regionalism
- Colors: black, red
- Slogan: Party-list for Mindanao by Mindanaoans.
- Sector represented: Mindanaoans
- House of Representatives: 1 / 61 (Party-list seats only)

Website
- Website (archived)

Anak Mindanao (lit. 'Children of Mindanao') also known as AMIN Partylist is a party-list in the Philippines, based in Mindanao.

Anak Mindanao was established in 1997. It seek representation of Mindanaoans.

In the 2004 elections for the House of Representatives the party-list got 269,750 votes (2.1204% of the Philippine vote) and one seat (Mujiv Hataman). In the May 14, 2007 election, the party won 1 seat in the nationwide party-list vote.

== Electoral performance ==
Election	Votes	%	Seats
2004	269,750	2.12%	1
2007	338,185	2.12%	2
2010	161,418	0.54%	0
2013	376,932	1.38%	1
2016	706,689	2.18%	2
2019	212,323	0.76%	1
2022	134,647	0.37%	0

=== 2004 election result in Mindanao ===
- Zamboanga Peninsula: 31,744 votes, 9.4201%
- Northern Mindanao: 66,512 votes, 9.2306%
- Davao Region: 3,830 votes, 0.6634%
- Soccsksargen: 7,755 votes, 1.2371%
- Caraga: 1,451 votes, 0.4648%
- Autonomous Region in Muslim Mindanao: 147,539 votes, 18.8769%
