= Vote counting in the Philippines =

Since the 2008 Autonomous Region in Muslim Mindanao general election, the voters in the Philippines have to shade the oval that was indicated before the candidate's name, and a voting machine manufactured by Smartmatic automatically counts each ballot as it is fed into it. The results are then printed as the election return and sent electronically to the city or municipal Board of Canvassers.

In 2016, for the third time in a row, the Philippines automated their elections using electronic vote counting machines. The deployment of 92,500 of these machines was the largest in the world. Brazil and India, countries which also use technology to process their votes, employ e-voting instead of an automated count.

For the 2019 elections, the COMELEC presented its source code for review by accredited U.S. software testing company Pro V&V in an effort to make the automated elections transparent.

The Philippines stands today with Brazil, Estonia, Belgium and Venezuela at the forefront of election technology adoption.

== Use of voting machines in elections ==
=== 2008 Autonomous Region in Muslim Mindanao regional elections ===
The Philippines began using technology to streamline vote counting with the automated regional elections held in Autonomous Region in Muslim Mindanao (ARMM) on August 11, 2008. In the Maguindanao province, voters used Smartmatic's electronic voting machines, while voters in the other 5 provinces (Shariff Kabunsuan, Lanao del Sur, Basilan, Sulu, and Tawi-Tawi) used manually marked ballots processed using OMR technology. The overall reaction of both the public and authorities was positive toward the process.

=== 2010 Philippine general election ===
The adaptation of the system at national level however suffered from a number of technical and procedural problems. Civil society group CenPEG and minor party All Filipino Democratic Movement (KAAKBAY), amongst others, questioned the constitutionality of the election and its safety against electoral fraud or cheating.

=== 2013 Philippine general election ===
In spite of the problems experienced with counting machines in 2010, the same technology was used in the subsequent 2013 mid-term election where approximately 760 million votes were cast by some 50 million voters. This time, a quarter of all machines experienced problems in transmitting the results. According to poll watchdog AES Watch, up to 8.6 million votes had been affected, or possibly disenfranchised, significantly contributing to AES Watch's assessment of the 2013 elections being "a technology and political disaster," and fueling speculations of "vote rigging."

In 2015, A group led by former poll commissioner Augusto "Gus" Lagman demonstrated a hybrid system as an alternative to the PCOS machines and the automated election system. The Precinct Automated Tally System (PATaS) would combine manual and automated processes. But during its demonstration, there were redundancies, and the process was painstakingly slow. The system involves manually writing votes on the ballot, to be encoded in a laptop afterwards. Issues with legibility of handwriting (including mistaking certain letters to be numbers), laptops breaking down, and failure of transmission of canvas were reported. Lawmaker also expressed concern over the logistical nightmares, not to mention that a hybrid system is essentially a return to manual elections, "a step backwards to a process marred by rampant cheating and other fraudulent election practices in the past."

=== 2016 Philippine general election ===
For the 2016 general elections, the Commission on Elections leased 94,000 new Optical mark recognition (OMR) machines from London-based electronic voting technology company Smartmatic, while the old ones would be refurbished for the 2019 elections, in a contract totalling 7.9 billion pesos.

The Commission unanimously voted to disallow the issuance of voting receipt to voters, although they allowed on-screen verification for 15 seconds. It also shelved its original plans for conduct the balloting in shopping malls, while allowing some limited replacement ballots for voters whose original ballot is rejected by the vote counting machine.

==== Procurement ====
In April 2015, the Supreme Court of the Philippines had invalidated the 300 million-peso contract between the Commission on Elections and Smartmatic-TIM for diagnostics and repair of the 80,000 Precinct Count Optical Scan (PCOS) machines in April 2015, ruling that the commission "failed to justify its resort to direct contracting."

Restarting the process, in June 2015, the commission conducted a mock election using a "hybrid" system of manual counting and electronic transmission of results. Former elections commissioner Gus Lagman argued in favor of the hybrid system, referring to its reliability against manipulation, as opposed to full automation, and the lower price. Senator Francis Escudero disapproved of the use of the hybrid system, saying "it brings back memories of the Hello Garci controversy".

Only a few days later, the Commission informed the House of Representatives Committee on Suffrage and Electoral Reforms that they had decided not to use the hybrid system. They also limited their options to either refurbishing 80,000 counting machines and leasing 23,000 more, or leasing all machines. In the meantime, the commission had overturned its self-imposed disqualification of Smartmatic from bidding on counting machines. On a committee hearing held in late July, Elections chairman Andres Bautista told lawmakers that the commission had decided to award Smartmatic-TIM a 1.7 billion peso contract to lease 23,000 OMR counting machines. Days later, the commission declared the bidding for the refurbishment of 80,000 machines a failure, after two of the three bidders backed out, stating the project would be unfeasible at the commission's tight schedule, while the third bidder was disqualified.

On August 13, the commission agreed to lease 94,000 new OMR machines from Smartmatic, while the old machines used in 2010 and 2013 would be refurbished for the 2019 elections, in a contract totalling 7.9 billion pesos. Smartmatic also won a 500 million pesos contract for electronic results transmission services.

==== Security provisions ====
Having received military intelligence reports in July that China might sabotage the elections, in September 2015 the commission sought the production of the voting machines be transferred from China to Taiwan. While manufacturer Smartmatic acquiesced to the request, China denied any sabotage plans, calling it "sheer fabrication."

The commission partnered with De La Salle University to conduct the source code review, that was said to be more comprehensive than the 2010 and 2013 reviews, which were done just a month and four days ahead of the election, respectively.

The warehouse of the voting machines and the paper bins was moved to the warehouse of bus company JAM Liner in Santa Rosa, Laguna. The commission paid 69 million pesos for renting the warehouse.

=== 2019 Philippine general election ===
The COMELEC implemented the automated election system in the country's midterm election of 2019. In an effort to improve AES and make the process transparent, the Commission hired an independent firm to review its source code.

Based on the results of random manual audits (RMA), the 2019 automated elections has the highest rate of accuracy among the previous ones since the AES was implemented. The accuracy rate for the senatorial votes was at 99.9971 percent, while for members of the House it was 99.9946 percent. For the local level, the accuracy rate was 99.9941 percent for mayor.

Although there were cheating allegations, experts say these were more in the form of vote-buying and happen outside the automated counting. “We have observed that vote buying became more rampant since automated polls took place in 2010 because the politicians cannot rig the vote counting machines. Now, they go straight to organizers, operators in barangays. Ways of vote buying became more creative,” said Lawyer Ona Carritos, executive director of election watchdog Legal Network for Truthful Elections.

In a survey done by SWS, 4 out of 5 Filipinos were satisfied with the automated election results, showing high trust in the automated system. Majority also expressed that they would like to continue with the automated process in the next coming elections.

=== 2025 Philippine general election ===
COMELEC Chairman George Garcia and Miru Systems Co. Ltd President, Chung Jin Bok, on March 11, 2024 signed the 2025 automated election system (AES) service contract with Transparency Audit/Count (FASTrAC) for the 2025 elections in the Philippines at Palacio del Gobernador. On February 22, 2024, the Comelec En banc held that the Miru Systems Co Ltd, Integrated Computer Systems, St. Timothy Construction Corporation, and Centerpoint Solutions Technologies, Inc. (MIRU-ICS-STCC-CPSTI) is the "Single Calculated and Responsive Bid" with a bid offer of PHP17,988,878,226.55. The contract includes 110,000 automated counting machines, election management systems, consolidation and canvassing systems, ballot printing, ballot boxes and other peripherals.
