= Presidency of Gloria Macapagal Arroyo =

Philippine presidential administration from 2001 to 2010

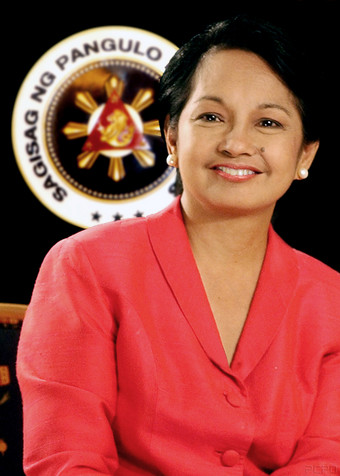
- Official portrait, c.2004
- Presidency of Gloria Macapagal Arroyo; January 20, 2001 – June 30, 2010
- President: Gloria Macapagal Arroyo
- Vice President: None (Jan–Feb 2001); Teofisto Guingona Jr. (2001–2004); Noli de Castro (2004–2010)
- Cabinet: See list
- Party: KAMPI and Lakas (2001–09); Lakas–Kampi (2009–10)
- Election: 2004
- Seat: Malacañang Palace, Manila
- Seal of the President

The presidency of Gloria Macapagal Arroyo lasted two consecutive terms in which she served as the 14th President of the Philippines. She was president from 2001 to 2004, and 2004 to 2010. Her first term started on January 20, 2001, during the Second EDSA Revolution. In 2004 during a Philippine presidential election after the second EDSA revolution, she was the incumbent president and had to overcome the opponent Fernando Poe. She was inaugurated on June 30, 2004.

== Administration and cabinet ==
Office	Name	Term
President Head of state Head of government	H.E. Gloria Macapagal Arroyo	2001–2010
Vice-President	H.E. Teofisto Guingona Jr.	2001–2004
Vice-President	H.E. Noli de Castro	2004–2010
Executive Secretary	Renato de Villa	January 22, 2001 – May 7, 2001
Executive Secretary	Alberto Romulo	May 8, 2001 – August 24, 2004
Executive Secretary	Eduardo Ermita	August 24, 2004 – February 23, 2010
Executive Secretary	Ret. Police Dir. Gen. Leandro Mendoza	February 24, 2010 – June 30, 2010
Secretary of Agrarian Reform	Horacio Morales	July 1, 1998 – February 11, 2001
Secretary of Agrarian Reform	Hernani Braganza	February 12, 2001 – January 15, 2003
Secretary of Agrarian Reform	Roberto Pagdanganan	January 20, 2003 – January 20, 2004
Secretary of Agrarian Reform	Jose Marie Ponce	February 20, 2004 – August 24, 2004
Secretary of Agrarian Reform	Rene Villa	August 26, 2004 – July 9, 2005
Secretary of Agrarian Reform	Nasser Pangandaman	July 10, 2005 – June 30, 2010
Secretary of Agriculture	Domingo F. Panganiban	January 20, 2001 – March 31, 2001
Secretary of Agriculture	Leonardo Q. Montemayor	March 31, 2001 – December 8, 2002
Secretary of Agriculture	Luis Lorenzo, Jr.	December 9, 2002 – August 15, 2004
Secretary of Agriculture	Arthur C. Yap	August 23, 2004 – July 15, 2005
Secretary of Agriculture	Domingo F. Panganiban	July 16, 2005 – October 22, 2006
Secretary of Agriculture	Arthur C. Yap	October 23, 2006 – March 4, 2010
Secretary of Agriculture	Bernie Fondevilla	March 5, 2010 – June 30, 2010
Secretary of Budget and Management	Emilia Boncodin	January 23, 2001 – July 9, 2005
Secretary of Budget and Management	Romulo Neri	July 19, 2005 – February 6, 2006
Secretary of Budget and Management	Rolando Andaya, Jr.	February 6, 2006 – March 2, 2010
Secretary of Budget and Management	Joaquin Lagonera (Interim)	March 11, 2010 – June 4, 2010
Secretary of Budget and Management	Joaquin Lagonera (Acting)	June 5, 2010– June 30, 2010
Secretary of Education	Raul Roco	January 22, 2001 – August 2002
Secretary of Education	Edilberto de Jesus	September 2002 – August 2004
Secretary of Education	Florencio B. Abad	September 23, 2004 – July 8, 2005
Secretary of Education	Ramon Bacani (OIC)	July 8, 2005 – August 30, 2005
Secretary of Education	Fe Hidalgo (OIC)	August 31, 2005 – October 3, 2006
Secretary of Education	Jesli Lapus	October 4, 2006 – March 15, 2010
Secretary of Education	Mona Valisno	March 10, 2010 – June 30, 2010
Secretary of Energy	Jose Isidro Camacho	March 2, 2001 – June 7, 2001
Secretary of Energy	Vincent S. Pérez	June 8, 2001 – March 21, 2005
Secretary of Energy	Raphael Lotilla	March 22, 2005 – July 31, 2007
Secretary of Energy	Ret. Gen. Angelo T. Reyes, AFP	August 1, 2007 – March 25, 2010
Secretary of Energy	Jose C. Ibazeta	March 31, 2010 – June 30, 2010
Secretary of Environment and Natural Resources	Joemarie D. Gerochi (OIC)	January 26, 2001 – March 28, 2001
Secretary of Environment and Natural Resources	Heherson T. Alvarez	March 29, 2001 – December 12, 2002
Secretary of Environment and Natural Resources	Elisea G. Gozun	December 13, 2002 – August 31, 2004
Secretary of Environment and Natural Resources	Michael T. Defensor	September 1, 2004 – February 15, 2006
Secretary of Environment and Natural Resources	Ret. Gen. Angelo T. Reyes, AFP	February 16, 2006 – July 31, 2007
Secretary of Environment and Natural Resources	Jose L. Atienza Jr.	August 1, 2007 – December 28, 2009
Secretary of Environment and Natural Resources	Eleazar P. Quinto	January 4, 2010 – February 11, 2010
Secretary of Environment and Natural Resources	Horacio C. Ramos	February 12, 2010 – June 30, 2010
Secretary of Finance	Alberto G. Romulo	January 23, 2001 – June 30, 2001
Secretary of Finance	Jose Isidro N. Camacho	June 30, 2001 – November 30, 2003
Secretary of Finance	Juanita D. Amatong	December 1, 2003 – February 14, 2005
Secretary of Finance	Cesar V. Purisima	February 15, 2005 – July 15, 2005
Secretary of Finance	Margarito B. Teves	July 22, 2005 – June 30, 2010
Secretary of Foreign Affairs	Teofisto T. Guingona, Jr.	January 2001 – July 2002
Secretary of Foreign Affairs	Blas F. Ople	July 2002 – December 2003
Secretary of Foreign Affairs	Delia Albert	December 2003 – August 2004
Secretary of Foreign Affairs	Alberto Romulo	August 24, 2004 – June 30, 2010
Secretary of Health	Manuel M. Dayrit	February 26, 2001 – May 31, 2005
Secretary of Health	Francisco T. Duque	June 1, 2005 – January 18, 2010
Secretary of Health	Esperanza I. Cabral	January 18, 2010 – June 30, 2010
Secretary of the Interior and Local Government	Anselmo S. Avelino, Jr	January 20, 2001 – January 28, 2001
Secretary of the Interior and Local Government	Jose D. Lina, Jr.	January 29, 2001 – July 11, 2006
Secretary of the Interior and Local Government	Ret. Gen. Angelo T. Reyes, AFP	July 12, 2004 – February 16, 2006
Secretary of the Interior and Local Government	Ronaldo V. Puno	April 4, 2006 – June 30, 2010
Secretary of Justice	Hernando B. Perez	January 2001 – January 2002
Secretary of Justice	Maria Merceditas N. Gutierrez (Acting)	November 2002 – January 2003
Secretary of Justice	Simeon A. Datumanong	January 2003 – December 2003
Secretary of Justice	Maria Merceditas N. Gutierrez	December 24, 2003 – August 2004
Secretary of Justice	Raul M. Gonzalez	August 25, 2004 – June 2009
Secretary of Justice	Agnes Devanadera	June 9, 2009 – February 2010
Secretary of Justice	Alberto Agra (Acting)	March 1, 2010 – June 2010
Secretary of Labor and Employment	Patricia Aragon Santo Tomas	February 12, 2001 – June 2006
Secretary of Labor and Employment	Arturo D. Brion	June 16, 2006 – December 2008
Secretary of Labor and Employment	Marianito D. Roque	December 20, 2008 – June 30, 2010
Secretary of National Defense	Orlando S. Mercado	January 22 – 25, 2001
Secretary of National Defense	Ret. Gen. Angelo T. Reyes, AFP	March 19, 2001 – August 29, 2003
Secretary of National Defense	Gloria Macapagal-Arroyo (in concurrent capacity as President)	September 1 – October 2, 2003
Secretary of National Defense	Eduardo R. Ermita	October 3, 2003 – August 24, 2004
Secretary of National Defense	Avelino J. Cruz, Jr.	August 25, 2004 – November 30, 2006
Secretary of National Defense	Gloria Macapagal-Arroyo (in concurrent capacity as President)	November 30, 2006 – February 1, 2007
Secretary of National Defense	Ret. Police Dir. Gen. Hermogenes E. Ebdane, Jr.	February 1 – July 1, 2007
Secretary of National Defense	Norberto Gonzales	July 1 – August 3, 2007
Secretary of National Defense	Gilberto C. Teodoro, Jr.	August 3, 2007 – November 15, 2009
Secretary of National Defense	Norberto Gonzales (Acting)	November 15, 2009 – June 30, 2010
Secretary of Public Works and Highways	Simeon A. Datumanong	2001 – 2003
Secretary of Public Works and Highways	Bayani F. Fernando	January 15, 2003 – April 15, 2003
Secretary of Public Works and Highways	Florente Soriquez (Acting)	April 16, 2003 – February 13, 2005
Secretary of Public Works and Highways	Hermogenes Ebdane, Jr.	February 14, 2005 – February 5, 2007
Secretary of Public Works and Highways	Manuel M. Bonoan (OIC)	February 5, 2007 – July 3, 2007
Secretary of Public Works and Highways	Ret. Police Dir. Gen. Hermogenes Ebdane, Jr.	July 3, 2007 – October 26, 2009
Secretary of Public Works and Highways	Victor A. Domingo (Acting)	October 26, 2009 – July 5, 2010
Secretary of Science and Technology	Rogelio A. Panlasigui (Acting)	January 2, 2001 – March 11, 2001
Secretary of Science and Technology	Estrella Alabastro	March 12, 2001 – June 30, 2010
Secretary of Social Welfare and Development	Corazon Juliano Soliman	January 29, 2001 – July 8, 2005
Secretary of Social Welfare and Development	Luwalhati F. Pablo (OIC)	July 9, 2005 – February 5, 2006
Secretary of Social Welfare and Development	Esperanza Cabral	February 6, 2006 – January 17, 2010
Secretary of Social Welfare and Development	Celia Yangco (Acting)	January 18, 2010 – June 30, 2010
Secretary of Tourism	Richard J. Gordon	February 12, 2001 – January 4, 2004
Secretary of Tourism	Robert Dean Barbers (OIC)	January 19, 2004 – February 25, 2004
Secretary of Tourism	Roberto Pagdanganan	June 12, 2004 – August 31, 2004
Secretary of Tourism	Evelyn B. Pantig (OIC)	September 1, 2004 – November 29, 2004
Secretary of Tourism	Joseph Ace Durano	November 30, 2004 – June 30, 2010
Secretary of Trade and Industry	Manuel Roxas II	2000 – 2003
Secretary of Trade and Industry	Cesar V. Purisima	2004 – 2005
Secretary of Trade and Industry	Juan B. Santos	2005 – 2005
Secretary of Trade and Industry	Peter B. Favila	2005 – 2010
Secretary of Transportation and Communications	Vicente C. Rivera, Jr.	July 1, 1998 – January 30, 2001
Secretary of Transportation and Communications	Pantaleon Alvarez	January 29, 2001 – July 4, 2002
Secretary of Transportation and Communications	Ret. Police Dir. Gen. Leandro R. Mendoza	July 4, 2001 – March 10, 2010
Secretary of Transportation and Communications	Anneli R. Lontoc	March 10, 2010 – June 30, 2010
Cabinet Secretary	Ricardo Saludo	2001–2004
Cabinet Secretary	Silvestre H. Bello III	2004–2010
Chairperson of the Commission on Higher Education	Ester A. Garcia	July 12, 1999 – May 31, 2003
Chairperson of the Commission on Higher Education	Bro. Rolando Ramos Dizon, FSC	June 2, 2003 – October 17, 2004
Chairperson of the Commission on Higher Education	Fr. Rolando de la Rosa	October 18, 2004 – April 30, 2005
Chairperson of the Commission on Higher Education	Carlito S. Puno (Acting)	May 3, 2005 – November 16, 2005
Chairperson of the Commission on Higher Education	Carlito S. Puno	November 17, 2005 – August 15, 2007
Chairperson of the Commission on Higher Education	Romulo L. Neri (Acting)	August 16, 2007 – July 31, 2008
Chairperson of the Commission on Higher Education	Nona S. Ricafort (OIC)	August 1–31, 2008
Chairperson of the Commission on Higher Education	Emmanuel Y. Angeles (Acting)	September 1, 2008 – June 30, 2010
Chairman of the Metropolitan Manila Development Authority	Benjamin C. Abalos Sr.	January 2001 – 2002
Chairman of the Metropolitan Manila Development Authority	Bayani Fernando	February 2002 – 2009
Chairman of the Metropolitan Manila Development Authority	Oscar Inocentes	October 2009 – June 30, 2010
Chief of the Presidential Management Staff	Sec. Elena Bautista-Horn	2004 – 2010
Presidential Chief of Staff	Sec. Renato Corona	2001
Presidential Chief of Staff	Sec. Rigoberto Tiglao	2002 – 2004
Presidential Chief of Staff	Sec. Mike Defensor	2006 – 2007
Presidential Chief of Staff	Sec. Joey Salceda	2007
Lead Convenor of the National Anti-Poverty Commission	Dulce Q. Saguisag	November 2000 – February 2002
Lead Convenor of the National Anti-Poverty Commission	Teresita Quintos-Deles	February 2002 – October 2003
Lead Convenor of the National Anti-Poverty Commission	Camilo L. Sabio	October 6, 2003 – January 2004
Lead Convenor of the National Anti-Poverty Commission	Veronica F. Villavicencio	February 9, 2004 – August 2004
Lead Convenor of the National Anti-Poverty Commission	Imelda M. Nicolas	July 8, 2004 – July 8, 2005
Lead Convenor of the National Anti-Poverty Commission	Datu Zamzamin L. Ampatuan (Acting)	July 18, 2005
Lead Convenor of the National Anti-Poverty Commission	Cerge M. Remonde	August 16, 2006 – September 22, 2006
Lead Convenor of the National Anti-Poverty Commission	Domingo F. Panganiban	October 18, 2006 – June 2010
Director-General of the National Economic and Development Authority	Dante Canlas	January 24, 2001 – December 16, 2002
Director-General of the National Economic and Development Authority	Romulo Neri	December 17, 2002 – July 18, 2005
Director-General of the National Economic and Development Authority	Augusto Santos	July 14, 2005 – February 16, 2006
Director-General of the National Economic and Development Authority	Romulo Neri	February 16, 2006 – August 16, 2007
Director-General of the National Economic and Development Authority	Augusto Santos (Acting)	August 16, 2007 – July 27, 2008
Director-General of the National Economic and Development Authority	Raphael G. Recto	July 28, 2008 – August 16, 2009
Director-General of the National Economic and Development Authority	Augusto Santos (Acting)	August 19, 2009 – June 29, 2010
National Security Adviser and Director-General	Roilo S. Golez	February 19, 2001 – January 4, 2004
National Security Adviser and Director-General	Norberto Gonzales	February 1, 2004 – August 21, 2004
National Security Adviser and Director-General	Ret. Police Dir. Gen. Hermogenes E. Ebdane, Jr.	August 22, 2004 – February 14, 2005
National Security Adviser and Director-General	Norberto Gonzales	February 15, 2005 – January 31, 2010
National Security Adviser and Director-General	Milo S. Ibrado, Jr. (Acting)	December 15, 2009 – June 30, 2010
Presidential Adviser on the Peace Process	Eduardo R. Ermita	2001 – 2003
Presidential Adviser on the Peace Process	Teresita Quintos-Deles	October 2, 2003 – July 8, 2005
Presidential Adviser on the Peace Process	Jesus G. Dureza	July 2005 – June 15, 2008
Presidential Adviser on the Peace Process	Ret. Gen. Hermogenes C. Esperon, Jr., AFP	June 15, 2008 – February 2009
Presidential Adviser on the Peace Process	Ret. Police Dir. Gen. Avelino Razon, Jr.	February 2009 – October 12, 2009
Presidential Adviser on the Peace Process	Nabil A. Tan	October 13, 2009 – October 23, 2010
Presidential Adviser on the Peace Process	Annabelle Abaya	October 23, 2009 – June 30, 2010
Presidential Spokesperson	Sec. Rigoberto Tiglao	2001 – 2002
Presidential Spokesperson	Sec. Ignacio R. Bunye (in concurrent capacity as press secretary)	2002 – 2008
Presidential Spokesperson	Sec. Eduardo R. Ermita (in concurrent capacity as Executive Secretary)	2008 – 2009
Press Secretary	Noel C. Cabrera	January 23, 2001 – March 31, 2002
Press Secretary	Rigoberto D. Tiglao	April 1–15, 2002
Press Secretary	Silvestre Afable	April 16 – July 15, 2002
Press Secretary	Ignacio R. Bunye	July 16, 2002 – January 19, 2003
Press Secretary	Hernani Braganza	January 20, 2003 – June 17, 2003
Press Secretary	Milton A. Alingod	June 18, 2003 – August 30, 2004
Press Secretary	Ignacio R. Bunye	August 31, 2004 – June 15, 2008
Press Secretary	Jesus G. Dureza	June 16, 2008 – January 31, 2009
Press Secretary	Cerge M. Remonde	February 1, 2009 – January 19, 2010
Press Secretary	Conrado Limcaoco (Acting)	January 20–31, 2010
Press Secretary	Crispulo Icban, Jr. (Acting)	February 1, 2010 – June 30, 2010
Solicitor General	Ricardo P. Galvez	2000–2001
Solicitor General	Simeon V. Marcelo	2001–2002
Solicitor General	Carlos N. Ortega	2002
Solicitor General	Alfredo L. Benipayo	2002–2006
Solicitor General	Antonio Eduardo B. Nachura	2006–2007
Solicitor General	Agnes VST Devanadera	2007–2010
Solicitor General	Alberto C. Agra	2010

=== Other cabinet-level and high posts ===
- Executive Secretary
  - Renato de Villa (2001)
  - Renato C. Corona (acting) (2001)
  - Alberto Romulo (2001–2004)
  - Eduardo Ermita (2004–2010)
  - Leandro Mendoza (2010)
- National Security Adviser
  - Roilo Golez (2001–2004)
  - Norberto Gonzales (2004–2010)
- Press Secretary
  - Silvestre Afable (April - July 2002)
  - Milton Alingod (2003)
  - Hernani Braganza (2003–2004)
  - Ignacio Bunye (2004–2008)
  - Jesus Dureza (2008–2009)
  - Cerge Remonde (2009–2010)
  - Crispulo Icban, Jr (2010)
- Presidential Spokesman
  - Rigoberto Tiglao (2001–2002)
  - Ignacio Bunye (2002–2008)
- Presidential Chief of Staff
  - Rigoberto Tiglao (2002–2004)
  - Michael Defensor (2006–2007)
  - Joey Salceda (2007)
- Presidential Management Staff
  - Rigoberto Tiglao (2004–2006)
  - Arthur Yap (2006)
  - Cerge Remonde (2006–2009)
  - Hermogenes Esperon (2009–2010)
- Metropolitan Manila Development Authority Chairman
  - Benjamin Abalos (2001–2002)
  - Bayani Fernando (2002–2009)
  - Oscar Inocentes (2009–2010)

== Supreme Court appointments ==
Arroyo nominated the following to the Supreme Court of the Philippines:

=== Chief Justice ===
1. Artemio Panganiban - December 20, 2005
2. Reynato Puno - December 8, 2007
3. Renato Corona - May 17, 2010

=== Associate Justice ===
1. Antonio T. Carpio - October 26, 2001
2. Alicia Austria-Martinez - April 9, 2002
3. Renato Corona - April 9, 2003
4. Conchita Carpio-Morales - August 26, 2002
5. Romeo Callejo, Sr. - August 26, 2002
6. Adolfo Azcuna - October 17, 2002
7. Dante Tiñga - July 4, 2003
8. Minita Chico-Nazario - February 10, 2004
9. Cancio Garcia - October 7, 2004
10. Presbitero J. Velasco, Jr. - March 31, 2006
11. Antonio Eduardo Nachura - February 7, 2007
12. Ruben Reyes - August 2, 2007
13. Justice Teresita De Castro - December 3, 2007
14. Justice Arturo D. Brion - March 17, 2008
15. Justice Diosdado Peralta - January 14, 2009
16. Justice Lucas Bersamin - April 3, 2009
17. Justice Mariano del Castillo - July 29, 2009
18. Justice Roberto A. Abad - August 7, 2009
19. Justice Martin Villarama, Jr. - November 6, 2009
20. Justice Jose P. Perez - December 26, 2009
21. Justice Jose C. Mendoza - January 4, 2010 (her last SC justice appointee)

== First term (2001-2004) ==
=== Succession ===
Arroyo's ascent to the Philippine presidency in 2001 resulted from the ouster of her predecessor Joseph Estrada through a peaceful uprising dubbed as People Power II. On January 20, 2001, the Supreme Court declared the presidency vacant. The military and the national police had earlier withdrawn their support for Estrada. Arroyo was one of those who called for Estrada's resignation. Upon the news that Estrada had left Malacañang Palace and stepped down from office, Arroyo went to EDSA Shrine and took her oath of office as president.

At noon, Arroyo was sworn in as President of the Philippines by Chief Justice Hilario Davide, Jr. The Bible which she used was held by Cecilia Paz Abad, the youngest of daughter of then-Batanes Representative Florencio Abad. Coincidentally, Arroyo assumed office the same day as US President George W. Bush.

Join me therefore as we begin to tear down the walls that divide. Let us build an edifice of peace, progress, and economic stability.

— Gloria Arroyo, January 20, 2001

While the local media and its proponents hailed EDSA II as another peaceful "People Power," international views expressed through foreign media described it as a "conspiracy" to oust Estrada and install Arroyo as president. The New York Times reported that Southeast Asia-based political economist William Overholt called it "either... mob rule or mob rule as a cover for a well-planned coup." The International Herald Tribune reports that the "opportunist coalition of church, business elite and left... orchestrated the People Power II movement."

Weeks later, Estrada filed a lawsuit challenging the legal basis of the Arroyo presidency and insisting he remained the lawful president, though adding he would not try to reclaim his post. The Supreme Court issued its decision on March 2, 2001, asserting that Estrada had resigned the presidency and relinquished his post. The court unanimously voted to dismiss Estrada's petition, reaffirming the legitimacy of Arroyo's presidency.

On May 1, 2001, a week after Estrada was arrested on charges of plunder, an estimated 3,000,000 protesters sympathetic to Estrada degenerated into violence and attempted to storm the presidential palace to force Arroyo from office. Four people died, including two policemen, and more than 100 were wounded in clashes between security forces and rioters. After being dispersed, the crowd had looted stores and burned cars. Arroyo declared a 'state of rebellion' in Manila and ordered the arrests of opposition leaders who led the uprising and conspired to topple the government. The state of rebellion was lifted one week later, with Arroyo declaring that "the disorder has subsided."

Support for the opposition and Estrada subsequently dwindled after the victory of administration allied candidates in the midterm elections that was held later that month. Arroyo outlined her vision for the country as "building a strong republic" throughout her tenure. Her agenda consisted of building up a strong bureaucracy, lowering crime rates, increasing tax collection, improving economic growth, and intensifying counter-terrorism efforts.

=== 2001 midterm elections ===
The 2001 legislative elections and local elections were held in the Philippines on May 14, 2001, four months after Arroyo took office. Independent senatorial candidate Noli de Castro, a former television anchor of TV Patrol of ABS-CBN and a guest candidate of the opposition coalition, was announced as the topnotcher. The administration's coalition gained the majority.

=== Oakwood mutiny ===
The Oakwood mutiny occurred on July 27, 2003, when a group of 321 armed soldiers who called themselves "Bagong Katipuneros" led by Army Capt. Gerardo Gambala and Lt. Antonio Trillanes IV of the Philippine Navy took over the Oakwood Premier Ayala Center (now Ascott Makati) serviced apartment tower in Makati to show the Filipino people the alleged corruption of the Arroyo administration. The group also stated that they saw signs suggesting that Arroyo was going to declare martial law.

=== 2004 presidential election ===
Although the Philippine Constitution bars a president from re-election, it allows for the election of a person who has succeeded as president and has served for not more than four years. In December 2002, Arroyo made the surprise announcement that she would not seek a new term in the 2004 Philippine general election. Ten months later, however, she reversed her position and declared her intention to seek a direct mandate from the people, saying "there is a higher cause to change society... in a way that nourishes our future."

Arroyo faced a tough election campaign in early 2004 against Estrada friend and popular actor Fernando Poe, Jr., senator and former police general Panfilo Lacson, former senator Raul Roco, and Christian evangelist Eddie Villanueva. Her campaign platform centered on a shift to a parliamentary and federal form of government, job creation, universal health insurance, anti-illegal drugs, and anti-terrorism.

Arroyo lagged behind Poe in the polls prior to the campaign season, but her popularity steadily climbed to surpass Poe's. As predicted by pre-election surveys and exit polls, she won the election by a margin of over a million votes against her closest rival, Fernando Poe, Jr.

== Second term (2004-2010) ==
=== Inauguration ===
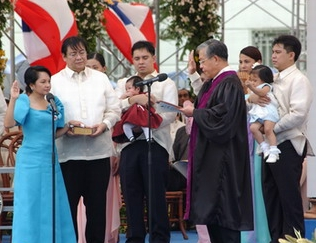
Arroyo taking her Oath of Office in Cebu City on June 30, 2004.

Arroyo took her oath of office on June 30, 2004. In a break with tradition, she chose to first deliver her inaugural address at the Quirino Grandstand in Manila before departing to Cebu City for her oath taking: the first time a Philippine president had taken the oath of office outside of Luzon.

Arroyo during her State of the Nation Address on July 28, 2008

=== State of emergency ===
On Friday, February 24, 2006, an alleged coup d'état plot was uncovered in the Philippines, headed by Brig. Gen. Danilo Lim.

The declaration of Proclamation No. 1017 (PP 1017) gave Arroyo the power to issue warrantless (and, until then, unconstitutional) arrests and to take over private institutions that run public utilities.

President Gloria Macapagal‑Arroyo, acting through the Department of Education, initially suspended classes at the elementary and secondary levels. In solidarity, many colleges and universities followed suit. Soon thereafter, by virtue of Proclamation 1017, Arroyo declared a nationwide State of Emergency in an effort to suppress the growing rebellion as her hold on power wavered. The government's first move under the emergency decree was to disperse demonstrators—especially those picketing along Epifanio de los Santos Avenue (EDSA). Among the protesters was former President Corazon Aquino, who joined leftist and far‑right activists in denouncing the administration. Multiple public figures were reportedly arrested during the crackdown.

After the plot was foiled and the rallies were dispersed, PP 1017 remained in effect for a week due to ongoing threats of military uprisings—such as the February 26 standoff at Fort Bonifacio led by Col. Ariel Querubin—as well as concerns over violence, illegal rallies, and public disturbances.

Six leftist representatives—namely, Satur Ocampo, Teodoro Casiño, and Joel Virador of Bayan Muna; Liza Maza of GABRIELA; and Crispin Beltran and Rafael Mariano of Anakpawis—were charged with rebellion. Crispin Beltran of Anakpawis was arrested on February 25 on charges of inciting to sedition and rebellion. To avoid further arrest, the other five found shelter at the Batasang Pambansa Complex.

On Saturday, February 25, the office of the Daily Tribune, a newspaper known as a hard-hitting critic of the Arroyo administration, was raided. After the raid, an issuance of Journalism Guideline followed, authored by the government in order to cope with the "present abnormal situation," according to then Chief of Staff Michael Defensor. The move to suppress freedom of the press against the Daily Tribune was criticized by Reporters Without Borders.

The decree was lifted on March 3, 2006. However, the opposition, lawyers, and concerned citizens filed a complaint with the Supreme Court contesting the constitutionality of PP 1017. The court, on May 4, declared the proclamation constitutional but stated that issuing warrantless arrests and seizing private institutions was illegal.

=== 2007 midterm elections ===
Legislative and local elections were held in the Philippines on May 14, 2007. Positions contested included half the seats in the Senate, which are elected for six-year terms, and all the seats in the House of Representatives, who were elected for three-year terms. The duly elected legislators of the 2007 elections joined the elected senators of the 2004 elections to comprise the 14th Congress of the Philippines. Arroyo's coalition won three senate seats and 123 seats in the house.

=== Manila Peninsula rebellion ===
A rebellion occurred on November 29, 2007, when detained Senator Antonio Trillanes IV, General Danilo Lim, and other Magdalo officials walked out of their trial and marched through the streets of Makati, called for the ouster of Arroyo, and seized the second floor of The Peninsula Manila Hotel along Ayala Avenue. Former Vice-President Teofisto Guingona also joined the march to the hotel.

Trillanes and Lim surrendered to authorities after an armored personnel carrier rammed into the lobby of the hotel. Director Geary Barias declared that the standoff at the Manila Peninsula Hotel was over as Trillanes, Lim, and other junior officers agreed to leave the hotel and surrender to Barias after the 6 hour siege. There was difficulty getting out for a while due to the tear gas that was covering the area where they were hiding.

Days after the mutiny, the Makati Regional Trial Court dismissed the rebellion charges against all the 14 civilians involved in the siege, and ordered their release.

=== K–12 implementation ===
After decades of surveys, consultations, and studies starting with the Monroe Survey in 1925 during the American period, the implementation of K–12 curriculum finally began on May 20, 2008, during the Arroyo administration when Senator Mar Roxas filed the Omnibus Education Reform Act of 2008 (Senate Bill 2294) to strengthen the Philippine education system through timely interventions on the quality of teachers, the medium of instruction used and the evaluation of students' aptitude, among other aspects and further emphasized by the ASEAN Charter on December 15, 2008. Both mandate the effectivity of K–12 four years later on April 24, 2012, during the administration of Arroyo's successor Benigno Aquino III which increase in the number of years in basic education, from 10 years to 12 years as consistent with global standards. The process lasted for 9 years until June 5, 2017, spanning from the administrations of Arroyo to Rodrigo Duterte.

On January 7, 2010, senator and presidential candidate Benigno Aquino III adopted the position of SB 2294; he said this will "give everyone an equal chance to succeed" and "have quality education and profitable jobs."

=== Impeachment complaints ===
In 2005, 2006, 2007 and 2008, impeachment complaints were filed against Arroyo, although none of the cases reached the required endorsement of 1/3 of the members for transmittal to and trial by the Senate.

On October 13, 2008, the 4th 97-page impeachment complaint against Arroyo was filed at the House of Representatives of the Philippines with the required endorsements by Party-list Representatives Satur Ocampo, Teodoro Casiño and Liza Maza. The complaint accuses Arroyo of corruption, extrajudicial killings, torture and illegal arrests. The impeachment further raised the issues on "national broadband network agreement with China, human rights violations, the Northrail project, the Mt. Diwalwal project, fertilizer fund scam, alleged bribery of members of the House, the swine scam under the Rural Credit Guarantee Corporation, and 2004 electoral fraud." The opposition complainants were Edita Burgos, Iloilo Vice Governor Rolex Suplico, Jose de Venecia III, Harry Roque, Armando Albarillo, a human rights victim, Roneo Clamor, Karapatan deputy secretary general, Josefina Lichauco, and representatives from civil society - Renato Constantino, Jr., Henri Kahn, Francisco Alcuaz, Rez Cortez, Virgilio Eustaquio, Jose Luis Alcuaz, Leah Navarro, Danilo Ramos, Concepcion Empeño, Elmer Labog, Armando Albarillo, Roneo Clamor, and Bebu Bulchand. The justice committee has 60 days to rule upon the complaint's sufficiency in form and substance. However, the opposition has only 28 House seats.

=== Estrada pardon ===
On October 25, 2007, supposedly based on the recommendation by the Department of Justice (DOJ), Arroyo granted a pardon to Joseph Estrada, who was convicted by the Sandiganbayan of plunder and imposed a penalty of reclusion perpetua. Press Secretary Ignacio Bunye noted that Estrada committed in his application not to seek public office, and he would be free from his Tanay resthouse on October 26, noon. Accordingly, DOJ Secretary Raul Gonzales categorically stated in 2008 that Estrada's plan to run for president in the scheduled 2010 elections is unconstitutional; Estrada, however, disagrees, saying that he is eligible to run for president again, based on the legal advice he got from former Supreme Court Chief Justice Andres Narvasa.

=== Martial law ===
In response to the massacre of 57 people in Ampatuan town, Arroyo placed Maguindanao under a state of martial law under Proclamation No. 1959. Executive Secretary Eduardo Ermita announced on the morning of December 5, 2009. In so doing, Malacañang has suspended the writ of habeas corpus in the province except "for certain areas," enabling the military to make arrests without court intervention. Her proclamation constituted the first declaration of martial law in the Philippines since 1972, when then-president infamously Ferdinand Marcos imposed it over the whole country.

=== Congressional bid in Pampanga ===
On November 30, 2009, after much speculation, Arroyo announced on the Philippine Broadcasting Service her congressional bid for the second district of Pampanga. A day later, she filed her candidacy under the Lakas-Kampi-CMD.

== Domestic policies ==
=== Economy ===
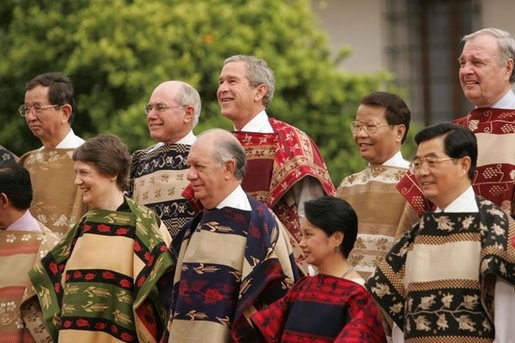
Arroyo with US President George W. Bush and other state leaders at the 2004 APEC Trade Summit

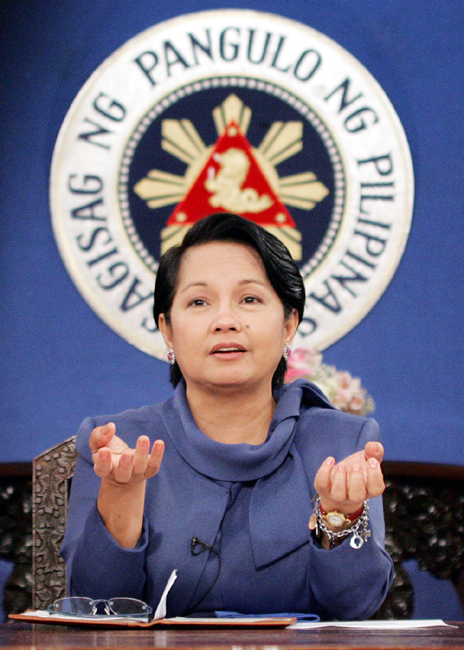
Arroyo gestures her arms in a meeting to her cabinet and business leaders during a roundtable discussion on "Increasing Export Investments" at the Kalayaan Briefing Room in Malacañang Palace

Arroyo, a practicing economist, made the economy the focus of her presidency. Based on official (National Economic and Development Authority) figures, economic growth in terms of gross domestic product has averaged 5.0% during the Arroyo presidency from 2001 up to the first quarter of 2008. This is higher than in the administration of the previous recent presidents: 3.8% average of Aquino, 3.7% average of Ramos, and 3.7% average of the Joseph Estrada administration. The Philippine economy grew at its fastest pace in three decades in 2007, with real GDP growth exceeding 7%. Arroyo's handling of the economy has earned praise from former "friend" and classmate in Georgetown, ex-US President Bill Clinton, who cited her "tough decisions" that put the Philippine economy back in shape.

Whether the official economic figures are accurate, or how they translate to improving lives of the citizens, however, is debatable. Studies made by the United Nations (UN) and local survey research firms show worsening, instead of improving, poverty levels. A comparative 2008 UN report shows that the Philippines lags behind its Asian neighbors, Indonesia, Thailand, Vietnam and China, in terms of poverty amelioration. The study reveals that from 2003 up to 2006, the number of poor Filipinos increased by 3.8 million, with poverty incidence being approximately three times higher in agricultural communities. With regards the problem of hunger, quarterly studies by the social polling research firm Social Weather Stations show that the number of Filipino households suffering from hunger has significantly increased during Arroyo's presidency. Her administration first set the record for hunger levels in March 2001, and beginning June 2004, broke the record again seven times. December 2008 figures saw the new record high of 23.7%, or approximately 4.3 million households, of Filipino families experiencing involuntary hunger.

A controversial expanded value added tax (e-VAT) law, considered the centerpiece of the Arroyo administration's economic reform agenda, was implemented in November 2005, aiming to complement revenue-raising efforts that could plug the country's large budget deficit. The country aims to balance the national budget by 2010. The tax measure boosted confidence in the government's fiscal capacity and helped to strengthen the Philippine peso, making it East Asia's best performing currency in 2005–06. The peso strengthened by nearly 20% in 2007, making it by far Asia's best performing currency for the year, a fact attributed to a combination of increased remittances from overseas Filipino workers and a strong domestic economy.

Annual inflation reached the 17-year high of 12.5 percent in August 2008, up from a record low of 2.8 percent registered in 2007. It eased to 8.8 percent in December 2008 as fuel and energy prices went down.

The managing director of the World Bank, Juan Jose Daboub, criticized the administration for not doing enough to curb corruption.

Early in her presidency, Arroyo implemented a controversial policy of holiday economics, adjusting holidays to form longer weekends with the purpose of boosting domestic tourism and allowing Filipinos more time with their families.

=== Charter change ===
In 2005, Arroyo initiated a movement for an overhaul of the constitution to transform the present presidential-bicameral republic into a federal parliamentary-unicameral form of government. At her 2005 State of the Nation Address, she claimed "The system clearly needs fundamental change, and the sooner the better. It's time to start the great debate on Charter Change".

In late 2006, the House of Representatives shelved a plan to revise the constitution through constituent assembly.

=== EO 464 and calibrated preemptive response ===
In late September 2005, Arroyo issued an executive order stating that demonstrations without permits would be pre-emptively stopped. Then members of the military testified in Congressional hearings that they were defying a direct order not to testify about their knowledge of the election scandal. Arroyo issued Executive Order No. 464 (EO 464), which prohibited government officials under the executive department from appearing in congressional inquiries without Arroyo's prior consent. These measures were challenged before the Supreme Court, which declared some sections as unconstitutional. After a meeting with Catholic bishops and government lawyers, Arroyo revoked EO 464 in March 2008.

=== Human rights ===
A May 2006 Amnesty International report expressed concern over the sharp rise in vigilante killings of militant activists and community workers in the Philippines. Task Force Usig, a special police unit tasked to probe reported extra-judicial killings, by state run death squads counts 115 murders and says most of these are the result of an internal purge by communist rebels. Human rights groups put the number as high as 830.

These violations were alleged to have been committed against left-leaning organizations and party-list groups including BAYAN, Bayan Muna and Anakpawis. These organizations accuse the Philippine National Police and Armed Forces of the Philippines for the deaths of these political opponents. Arroyo has condemned political killings "in the harshest possible terms" and urged witnesses to come forward.

An independent commission was assembled by Arroyo in August 2006 to investigate the killings. Headed by former Supreme Court Justice Jose Melo, the group known as the Melo Commission concluded that most of the killings were instigated by the Armed Forces of the Philippines, but found no proof linking the murder of activists to a "national policy" as claimed by the left-wing groups. On the other hand, the report "linked state security forces to the murder of militants and recommended that military officials, notably retired major general Jovito Palparan, be held liable under the principle of command responsibility for killings in their areas of assignment." Palparan, who retired on September 11, 2006, has been appointed by Arroyo to be part of the Security Council; this has alarmed left-leaning political parties about the potential for human rights violations.

Under Arroyo's presidency, the Philippines in 2006 became second only to Iraq as the world's riskiest place to report the news, with 46 journalists killed.

In her 2007 State of the Nation Address, Arroyo has set out her agenda for her last three years in office, and called for legislation to deal with a spate of political killings that have brought international criticism to her presidency. She promised to bring peace to the troubled south, and also defended a controversial new anti-terrorism legislation. Arroyo told the joint session of Congress that "I would rather be right than popular." Lawmakers and lawyers, however, were dismayed by the SONA's failure to highlight and address this major hindrance to human rights. Specifically, the Alternative Law Groups (ALG) echoed the lawmakers’ position that Mrs Arroyo failed to take responsibility for the problem.

In 2007, incidents of extrajudicial killings dropped 87%, with the decline attributed to the creation of a special task force to handle the killings.

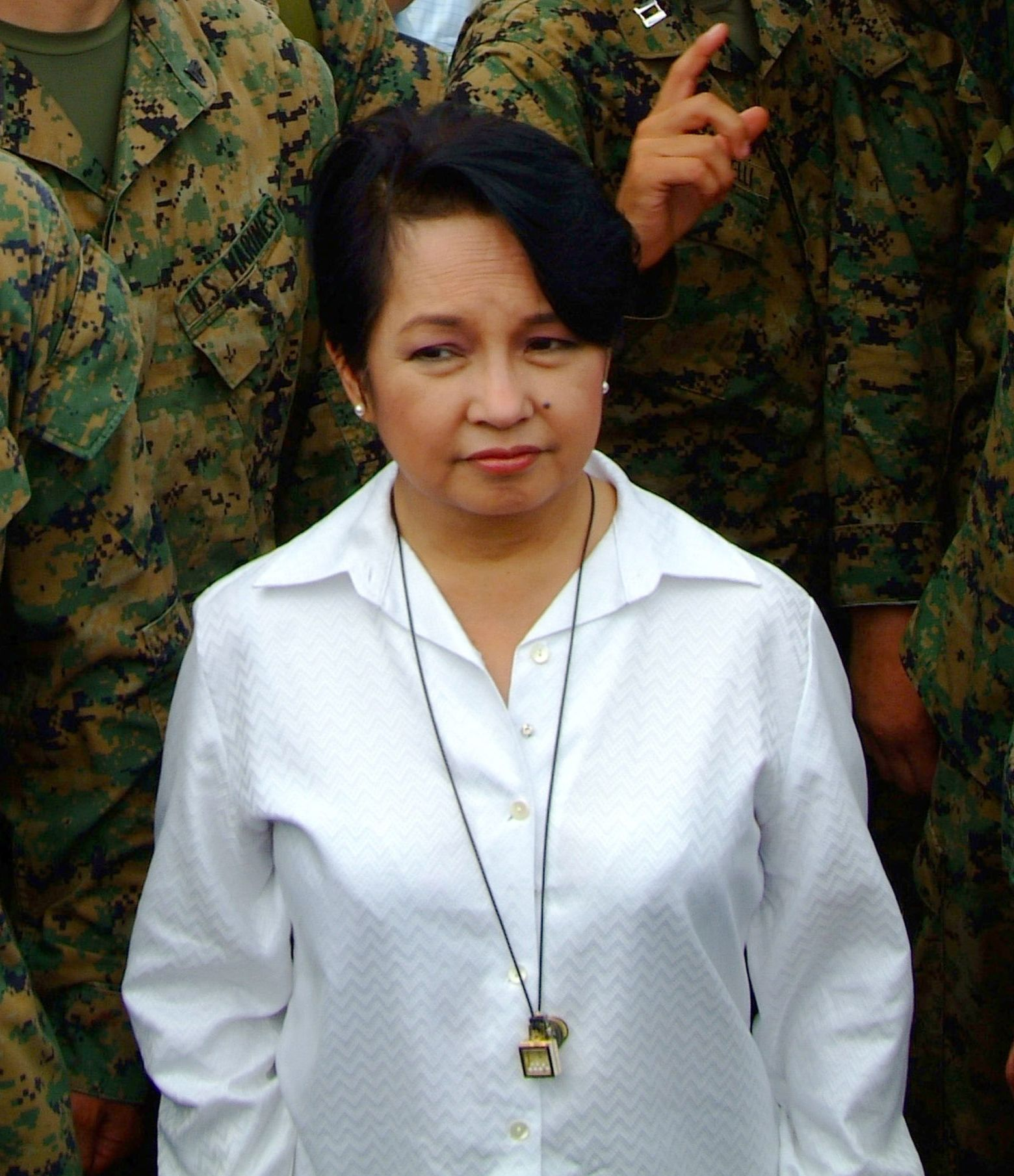
Gloria Macapagal Arroyo visited by United States Marines

=== Amnesty proclamation ===
On September 5, 2007, Arroyo signed Amnesty Proclamation 1377 for members of the Communist Party of the Philippines and its armed wing, the New People's Army; other communist rebel groups; and their umbrella organization, the National Democratic Front. The amnesty will cover the crime of rebellion and all other crimes "in pursuit of political beliefs," but not including crimes against chastity, rape, torture, kidnapping for ransom, use and trafficking of illegal drugs and other crimes for personal ends and violations of international law or convention and protocols "even if alleged to have been committed in pursuit of political beliefs".

== Foreign policies ==
=== Iraq War ===
The Arroyo administration has forged a strong relationship with the United States. Arroyo was one of the first world leaders who expressed support for the US-led coalition against global terrorism in the aftermath of the September 11, 2001 attacks, and remains one of its closest allies in the war on terror. Following the US-led invasion of Iraq, in July 2003 the Philippines sent a small humanitarian contingent which included medics and engineers. These troops were recalled in July 2004 in response to the kidnapping of Filipino truck driver Angelo de la Cruz. With the hostage takers demands met, the hostage was released. The force was previously due to leave Iraq the following month. The early pullout drew international condemnation, with the United States protesting against the action, saying giving in to terrorist demands should not be an option.

=== ASEAN Summit ===
Arroyo's foreign policy is anchored on building strong ties with the United States, East Asian and Southeast Asian nations, and countries where overseas Filipino workers work and live. In 2007, the Philippines was host to the 12th ASEAN Summit in Cebu City.

=== Philippines-Japan trade deal ===
On August 21, 2007, Arroyo's administration asked the Senate of the Philippines to ratify a $4 billion (£2 billion) trade deal with Japan (signed on 2006 with then-Japanese prime minister Junichiro Koizumi), which would create more than 300,000 jobs (by specifically increasing local exports such as shrimp to Japan). Japan also promised to hire at least 1,000 Philippine nurses. The opposition-dominated senate objected on the ground that toxic wastes would be sent to the Philippines; the government denied this due to the diplomatic notes which stated that it would not be accepting Japanese waste in exchange for economic concessions.

=== Council of Women World Leaders ===
Arroyo is a member of the Council of Women World Leaders, an international network of current and former women presidents and prime ministers whose mission is to mobilize the highest-level women leaders globally for collective action on issues of critical importance to women and equitable development.

== Pardons ==
Arroyo granted pardons to the following:

- Former President Joseph Estrada (2007) - convicted of plunder
- Pablo Martínez (2007) - convicted for being involved in the assassination of Benigno Aquino, Jr.
- Claudio Teehankee, Jr. (2008) - convicted of murder
- Rogelio Moreno (2009) - convicted for being involved in the assassination of Benigno Aquino, Jr.
- Rubén Aquino (2009) - convicted for being involved in the assassination of Benigno Aquino, Jr.
- Arnulfo Artates (2009) - convicted for being involved in the assassination of Benigno Aquino, Jr.
- Romeo Bautista (2009) - convicted for being involved in the assassination of Benigno Aquino, Jr.
- Jesús Castro (2009) - convicted for being involved in the assassination of Benigno Aquino, Jr.
- Arnulfo De Mesa (2009) - convicted for being involved in the assassination of Benigno Aquino, Jr.
- Rodolfo Desolong (2009) - convicted for being involved in the assassination of Benigno Aquino, Jr.
- Claro Lat (2009) - convicted for being involved in the assassination of Benigno Aquino, Jr.
- Ernesto Mateo (2009) - convicted for being involved in the assassination of Benigno Aquino, Jr.
- Filomeno Miranda (2009) - convicted for being involved in the assassination of Benigno Aquino, Jr.
- Former Congressman Romeo Jalosjos (2009) - convicted of rape

== Controversies ==
=== Fertilizer Fund scam ===
Arroyo was embroiled in a political controversy involving allegations that Agriculture Undersecretary Jocelyn Bolante diverted ₱728 million in fertilizer funds to Arroyo's 2004 presidential election campaign.

=== Hello Garci controversy ===
In the middle of 2005, Samuel Ong, a former deputy director of the country's National Bureau of Investigation, claimed to have audio tapes of wiretapped conversations between Arroyo and an official of the Commission on Elections. According to Ong, the contents of the tape prove that the 2004 national election was rigged by Arroyo in order to win by around one million votes. On June 27, Arroyo admitted to inappropriately speaking to a Comelec official, claiming it was a "lapse in judgement", but denied influencing the outcome of the election. Attempts to impeach Arroyo failed later that year.

Two witnesses, Antonio Rasalan and Clinton Colcol, stepped forward in August 2006, claiming involvement in an alleged plot to alter the results for the May 2004 elections. Rasalan claimed that he was fully convinced that the election returns presented at the House of Representatives were manufactured and had replaced the original documents. Colcol, a tabulator for the Commission on Elections, said that Arroyo only received 1,445 votes, while Fernando Poe Jr. received 2,141 in South Upi, Maguindanao during the May 2004 elections.

On January 25, 2008, Pulse Asia survey (commissioned by Genuine Opposition per former Senator Sergio Osmeña III) stated that 58% percent of Filipinos in Mindanao believed that Arroyo cheated in the 2004 Philippine general election. 70% also "believed that because of recurring allegations of election fraud, the credibility of the balloting process in Mindanao was at a record low."

=== National Broadband Network scandal ===
The Philippine National Broadband Network controversy is a political affair that centers upon allegations of corruption primarily involving Former Commission on Elections (COMELEC) Chairman Benjamin Abalos, First Gentleman Mike Arroyo and President Gloria Macapagal Arroyo regarding the proposed government-managed National Broadband Network (NBN) for the Philippines and the awarding of its construction to the Chinese firm Zhong Xing Telecommunication Equipment Company Limited (ZTE), a telecommunications and networking equipment provider.

The issue has captivated Filipino politics since it erupted in Philippine media around August 2007, largely through the articles of newspaper columnist Jarius Bondoc of the Philippine Star. It has also taken an interesting turn of events, including the resignation of Abalos as COMELEC chairman, the alleged bribery of congressmen and provincial governors (dubbed as "Bribery in the Palace"), the unseating of Jose de Venecia, Jr. as House Speaker, and the alleged "kidnapping" of designated National Economic and Development Authority (NEDA) consultant-turned-NBN/ZTE witness Rodolfo Noel "Jun" Lozada, Jr.

=== Controversial dinner party ===
In late July 2009, Arroyo went to New York City to dine with her friends at a lush Le Cirque restaurant and was highly criticized for her supposed outlandish dinner there with the Philippine delegation during her visit to the United States. Arroyo and her group reportedly dined for the cost of $20,000 or ₱1,000,000 as reported in the New York Post (a few days before Corazon Aquino died).

=== Northrail controversy ===
The Northrail project was surrounded by a controversy since 1997. In 2004, Arroyo signed a Memorandum of agreement with Sinomach and other contractors to construct a rail line from Caloocan to Clark Special Economic Zone to be completed in 2010. Many opposition senators and congressmen opposed, arguing that the project could cost US$500 million; this has led to corruption in the Arroyo cabinet and a series of cancellations. After the rail line was constructed from 2009 to 2010, it was eventually cancelled again in March 2011, with no plans and foreign support to continue the project.

== End of presidency ==
In November 2009, Arroyo formally declared her intention to run for a seat in the House of Representatives representing the 2nd District of Pampanga, making her the second Philippine President - after Jose P. Laurel - to pursue a lower office after the expiration of their presidency. A petition seeking to disqualify Arroyo from the race was dismissed by the Comelec for lack of merit, a decision which was later affirmed by the Supreme Court. With little serious competition, she was elected to congress in May 2010 with a landslide victory. After receiving final military honors at the inauguration ceremony of incoming President Benigno Aquino III, she headed straight to Pampanga for her own oath-taking as congresswoman.

== Arrest ==
Arroyo was arrested on November 18, 2011, after a Pasay court issued a warrant of arrest against her. This followed the filing of a complaint for electoral sabotage by COMELEC. The arrest warrant was served at St. Luke's Medical Center, Taguig where Arroyo had been confined. This and others resulted to corruption charges including her husband Mike and son Mikey. She was acquitted and released in 2016.
