= 12th Congress of the Philippines =

33rd legislative term of the Philippines

←	11th	13th	→
- GSIS Building (2010) (top) and Batasang Pambansa Complex (2010) (bottom)

Overview
- Term: July 23, 2001 – June 4, 2004
- President: Gloria Macapagal Arroyo
- Vice President: Teofisto Guingona Jr.

Senate
- Members: 24
- President: Franklin Drilon
- President pro tempore: Manny Villar (until August 12, 2002); Juan Flavier (from August 12, 2002)
- Majority leader: Loren Legarda (until June 3, 2002, and July 23, 2002 – January 12, 2004); Aquilino Pimentel Jr. (June 3 – July 23, 2002); Francis Pangilinan (from January 12, 2004)
- Minority leader: Aquilino Pimentel Jr. (until June 3, 2002); Tito Sotto (from June 3, 2002)

House of Representatives
- Members: 261
- Speaker: Jose de Venecia Jr.
- Deputy Speakers: Emilio Espinosa Jr.; Raul M. Gonzalez; Abdulgani Salapuddin
- Majority leader: Neptali Gonzales II
- Minority leader: Carlos Padilla

The 12th Congress of the Philippines (Filipino: Ikalabindalawang Kongreso ng Pilipinas), composed of the Philippine Senate and House of Representatives, met from July 23, 2001, until June 4, 2004, during the first three years of Gloria Macapagal Arroyo's presidency. The convening of the 12th Congress followed the 2001 general elections, which replaced half of the Senate membership, and the entire membership of the House of Representatives.

== Sessions ==
- First Regular Session: July 23, 2001 – June 7, 2002
  - First Special Session: January 8 – March 1, 2002
- Second Regular Session: July 22, 2002 – June 6, 2003
- Third Regular Session: July 28, 2003 – June 4, 2004
  - Second Special Session: January 5 – February 13, 2004

== Leadership ==
=== Senate ===
Senate President

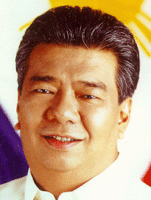
Franklin Drilon

- President: Franklin Drilon (Independent)
- President pro tempore:
  - Manny Villar (Independent), until August 12, 2002
  - Juan Flavier (Lakas), from August 12, 2002
- Majority Floor Leader:
  - Loren Legarda (Lakas), until June 3, 2002, and July 23, 2002 – January 12, 2004
  - Nene Pimentel (PDP–Laban), June 3 – July 23, 2002
  - Francis Pangilinan (Liberal), from January 12, 2004
- Minority Floor Leader:
  - Nene Pimentel (PDP–Laban), until June 3, 2002
  - Tito Sotto (LDP), from June 3, 2002

=== House of Representatives ===
House Speaker

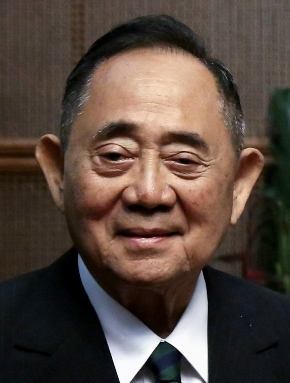
Jose de Venecia Jr.

- Speaker: Jose de Venecia Jr. (Pangasinan–4th, Lakas)
- Deputy Speakers:
  - Luzon: Emilio Espinosa Jr. (Masbate–2nd, NPC/INA)
  - Visayas: Raul M. Gonzalez (Iloilo City–Lone, Lakas)
  - Mindanao: Abdulgani Salapuddin (Basilan–Lone, Lakas)
- Majority Floor Leader: Neptali Gonzales II (Mandaluyong–Lone, Lakas)
- Minority Floor Leader: Carlos Padilla (Nueva Vizcaya–Lone, LDP)

== Members ==
=== Senate ===
Final Senate composition.

The following are the terms of the senators of this Congress, according to the date of election:

- For senators elected on May 11, 1998: June 30, 1998 – June 30, 2004
- For senators elected on May 14, 2001: June 30, 2001 – June 30, 2007

Senator	Party (Note: Party affiliation as of the 2001 election.)	Term	Term end
Edgardo Angara	LDP	1	2007
Tessie Aquino-Oreta	LDP	1	2004
Joker Arroyo	Lakas	1	2007
Robert Barbers	Lakas	1	2004
Rodolfo Biazon	LDP	1	2004
Rene Cayetano (Note: Rene Cayetano died on June 25, 2003.)	Lakas	1	2004
Noli de Castro (Note: Noli de Castro resigned on June 29, 2004, upon taking office as Vice President of the Philippines.)	Independent	1	2007
Franklin Drilon	Independent	2	2007
Loi Ejercito	Independent	1	2007
Juan Flavier	Lakas	2	2007
Gregorio Honasan (Note: Gregorio Honasan was elected on May 14, 2001, to succeed Teofisto Guingona Jr., who was appointed as Vice President of the Philippines on February 7, 2001. He took office on June 30, 2001.)	Independent	2	2004
Robert Jaworski	Lakas	1	2004
Panfilo Lacson	LDP	1	2007
Loren Legarda	Lakas	1	2004
Ramon Magsaysay Jr.	Lakas	2	2007
Blas Ople (Note: Blas Ople resigned on July 29, 2002, upon being appointed as Secretary of Foreign Affairs.)	LDP	2	2004
John Henry Osmeña	NPC	1	2004
Serge Osmeña	PDP–Laban	2	2007
Kiko Pangilinan	Liberal	1	2007
Nene Pimentel	PDP–Laban	1	2004
Ralph Recto	Lakas	1	2007
Ramon Revilla Sr.	Lakas	2	2004
Tito Sotto	LDP	2	2004
Manny Villar	Independent	1	2007

=== House of Representatives ===
Final House of Representatives composition.

Twelfth Congress representation map of the Philippines

The term of office of the members of the House of Representatives is from June 30, 2001, to June 30, 2004.

Province/City	District	Representative	Party (Note: Party affiliation at election.)	Term
Abra	Lone	Luis Bersamin Jr.	PDSP	1
Agusan del Norte	1st	Leovigildo Banaag	LDP	2
Agusan del Norte	2nd	Edelmiro Amante	Lakas	1
Agusan del Sur	Lone	Rodolfo Plaza	LDP	1
Aklan	Lone	Gabrielle Calizo-Quimpo	LDP	1
Albay	1st	Krisel Lagman	Lakas	2
Albay	2nd	Carlos R. Imperial	NPC (Note: Also affiliated with Independent Nacionalistas and Allies.)	1
Albay	3rd	Joey Salceda	Lakas	2
Antipolo	Lone	Victor Sumulong	LDP	2
Antique	Lone	Exequiel Javier	Lakas	1
Apayao	Lone	Elias Bulut Jr.	NPC	1
Aurora	Lone	Bella Angara	LDP	3
Bacolod	Lone	Monico Puentevella	Lakas	1
Baguio	Lone	Mauricio Domogan	Lakas	1
Basilan	Lone	Abdulgani Salapuddin	Lakas	2
Bataan	1st	Antonino Roman	Independent	2
Bataan	2nd	Tet Garcia	LDP	3
Batanes	Lone	Florencio Abad	Liberal	3
Batangas	1st	Eileen Ermita-Buhain	Lakas	1
Batangas	2nd	Francisco Perez II	Lakas	1
Batangas	3rd	Victoria Hernandez-Reyes	Reporma	1
Batangas	4th	Oscar Gozos	Lakas	1
Benguet	Lone	Samuel Dangwa	Reporma	1
Biliran	Lone	Gerardo Espina Sr.	NPC	3
Bohol	1st	Edgar Chatto	Lakas	1
Bohol	2nd	Roberto Cajes	Lakas	1
Bohol	3rd	Eladio Jala	Lakas	2
Bukidnon	1st	Nereus Acosta	Liberal	2
Bukidnon	2nd	Berthobal Ancheta	Lakas	1
Bukidnon	3rd	Juan Miguel Zubiri	Lakas	2
Bulacan	1st	Wilhelmino Sy-Alvarado	Lakas	2
Bulacan	2nd	Wilfrido Villarama	Aksyon	1
Bulacan	3rd	Lorna Silverio	Lakas	1
Bulacan	4th	Reylina Nicolas	Lakas	1
Cagayan	1st	Jack Enrile	Independent	2
Cagayan	2nd	Celia Taganas-Layus	NPC	1
Cagayan	3rd	Manuel Mamba	Lakas	1
Cagayan de Oro	Lone	Constantino Jaraula	LDP	2
Caloocan	1st	Recom Echiverri	Lakas	2
Caloocan	2nd	Edgar Erice	Liping Kalookan	1
Camarines Norte	Lone	Renato Unico Jr.	Lakas	1
Camarines Sur	1st	Rolando Andaya Jr.	Lakas	2
Camarines Sur	2nd	Sulpicio Roco Jr.	Aksyon	1
Camarines Sur	3rd	Felix William Fuentebella	NPC	1
Camarines Sur	4th	Felix Alfelor Jr.	Lakas	1
Camiguin	Lone	Jurdin Jesus Romualdo	NPC	2
Capiz	1st	Rodriguez Dadivas	Liberal	1
Capiz	2nd	Fredenil Castro	Liberal	1
Catanduanes	Lone	Joseph Santiago	NPC	1
Cavite	1st	Plaridel Abaya	Liberal	3
Cavite	2nd	Gilbert Remulla	Magdalo	1
Cavite	3rd	Napoleon Beratio (Note: Napoleon Beratio died on August 6, 2002.)	Magdalo	2
Cebu	1st	Jose Gullas	Alayon	1
Cebu	2nd	Simeon Kintanar	Alayon	2
Cebu	3rd	Antonio Yapha	Alayon	2
Cebu	4th	Clavel Martinez	PROMDI	2
Cebu	5th	Ace Durano	BAKUD (Note: Also affiliated with PROMDI.)	2
Cebu	6th	Nerissa Soon-Ruiz	Alayon	1
Cebu City	1st	Raul del Mar	PROMDI	1
Cebu City	2nd	Antonio Cuenco	PROMDI	1
Compostela Valley	1st	Manuel E. Zamora	Lakas	1
Compostela Valley	2nd	Prospero Amatong	Lakas	2
Cotabato	1st	Emmylou Taliño	Independent	1
Cotabato	2nd	Gregorio Ipong	NPC	2
Davao City	1st	Prospero Nograles	Lakas	1
Davao City	2nd	Vincent Garcia	NPC	1
Davao City	3rd	Ruy Elias Lopez	NPC	2
Davao del Norte	1st	Arrel Olaño	Lakas	1
Davao del Norte	2nd	Antonio Floirendo Jr.	Lakas	2
Davao del Sur	1st	Douglas Cagas	NPC	2
Davao del Sur	2nd	Claude Bautista	NPC	1
Davao Oriental	1st	Corazon Malanyaon	NPC	1
Davao Oriental	2nd	Joel Mayo Almario	Lakas	2
Eastern Samar	Lone	Marcelino Libanan	NPC	2
Guimaras	Lone	Edgar Espinosa	Lakas	1
Ifugao	Lone	Solomon Chungalao	Liberal	1
Ilocos Norte	1st	Roque Ablan Jr.	Lakas	1
Ilocos Norte	2nd	Imee Marcos	KBL	2
Ilocos Sur	1st	Salacnib Baterina	Lakas	2
Ilocos Sur	2nd	Eric Singson	Liberal	1
Iloilo	1st	Oscar Garin	NPC	1
Iloilo	2nd	Augusto Syjuco Jr.	LDP	2
Iloilo	3rd	Arthur Defensor Sr.	Lakas	1
Iloilo	4th	Narciso Monfort	Lakas	3
Iloilo	5th	Rolex Suplico	LDP	2
Iloilo City	Lone	Raul M. Gonzalez	Lakas	3
Isabela	1st	Rodolfo Albano Jr.	Lakas	1
Isabela	2nd	Edwin Uy	Lakas	1
Isabela	3rd	Bojie Dy	Lakas	1
Isabela	4th	Antonio Abaya (Note: Antonio Abaya died on February 26, 2003.)	Lakas	1
Isabela	4th	Giorgidi Aggabao (Note: Giorgidi Aggabao was elected on May 12, 2003, to succeed Antonio M. Abaya. He took office on May 19, 2003.)	NPC	0
Kalinga	Lone	Lawrence Wacnang	Liberal	2
La Union	1st	Manuel Ortega	NPC	2
La Union	2nd	Tomas Dumpit	NPC	2
Laguna	1st	Uliran Joaquin	NPC	2
Laguna	2nd	Jun Chipeco	KAMPI	3
Laguna	3rd	Danton Bueser	Liberal	2
Laguna	4th	Rodolfo San Luis	LDP	2
Lanao del Norte	1st	Alipio Cirilo Badelles	NPC	2
Lanao del Norte	2nd	Abdullah Dimaporo	Lakas	1
Lanao del Sur	1st	Faysah Dumarpa	PDP–Laban	1
Lanao del Sur	2nd	Benasing Macarambon Jr.	NPC	2
Las Piñas	Lone	Cynthia Villar	PPC	1
Leyte	1st	Ted Failon	Independent	1
Leyte	2nd	Trinidad Apostol	Lakas	1
Leyte	3rd	Eduardo Veloso	NPC	2
Leyte	4th	Maria Victoria Locsin (Note: Maria Victoria Locsin initially lost to Eufrocino Codilla Sr., but was proclaimed as representative-elect after Codilla was disqualified by the Second Division of the Commission on Elections (COMELEC) on June 14, 2001. On August 29, 2001, the COMELEC en banc reversed Codilla's disqualification and removed Locsin.)	NPC	2
Leyte	4th	Eufrocino Codilla Sr. (Note: Eufrocino Codilla Sr. took office on December 11, 2002, after winning an electoral protest against Maria Victoria Locsin.)	Lakas	0
Leyte	5th	Carmen Cari	Lakas	1
Maguindanao	1st	Didagen Dilangalen	PMP	3
Maguindanao	2nd	Guimid Matalam	PMP	1
Makati	1st	Teodoro Locsin Jr.	PDP–Laban	1
Makati	2nd	Butz Aquino	LDP	2
Malabon–Navotas	Lone	Ricky Sandoval	Lakas	2
Mandaluyong	Lone	Neptali Gonzales II	Lakas	3
Manila	1st	Ernesto Nieva	Lakas	2
Manila	2nd	Jaime Lopez	Lakas	1
Manila	3rd	Harry Angping	Lakas	2
Manila	4th	Rodolfo Bacani	Liberal	2
Manila	5th	Joey Hizon	Liberal	2
Manila	6th	Mark Jimenez (Note: Mark Jimenez was removed by the House of Representatives Electoral Tribunal on March 6, 2003, after an electoral protest.)	Independent	1
Marikina	Lone	Del de Guzman	Kabayani	1
Marinduque	Lone	Edmundo Reyes Jr.	Lakas	2
Masbate	1st	Vida Espinosa	NPC	3
Masbate	2nd	Emilio Espinosa Jr.	NPC	2
Masbate	3rd	Fausto Seachon Jr.	NPC	3
Misamis Occidental	1st	Ernie Clarete	PPC (Note: Also affiliated with the Partido para sa Demokratikong Reporma.) (Note: Also affiliated with Lakas–CMD.)	1
Misamis Occidental	2nd	Herminia Ramiro	Liberal	1
Misamis Oriental	1st	Oscar Moreno	Lakas	2
Misamis Oriental	2nd	Augusto Baculio	LDP	2
Mountain Province	Lone	Roy Pilando	LDP	1
Muntinlupa	Lone	Ruffy Biazon	LDP	1
Negros Occidental	1st	Jules Ledesma	UNA	3
Negros Occidental	2nd	Alfredo Marañon	UNA	3
Negros Occidental	3rd	Jose Carlos Lacson	UNA	1
Negros Occidental	4th	Charlie Cojuangco	UNA	2
Negros Occidental	5th	Jose Apolinario Lozada	Lakas	2
Negros Occidental	6th	Genaro Alvarez Jr.	NPC	3
Negros Oriental	1st	Jacinto Paras	Lakas	2
Negros Oriental	2nd	Emilio Macias	NPC	2
Negros Oriental	3rd	Herminio Teves	Lakas	2
Northern Samar	1st	Harlin Abayon	Liberal	2
Northern Samar	2nd	Romualdo Vicencio	Lakas	2
Nueva Ecija	1st	Josefina Joson	NPC	2
Nueva Ecija	2nd	Eleuterio Violago	Lakas	1
Nueva Ecija	3rd	Aurelio Umali	LDP	1
Nueva Ecija	4th	Raul Villareal	NPC	1
Nueva Vizcaya	Lone	Carlos Padilla	LDP	3
Occidental Mindoro	Lone	Josephine Sato	Lakas	1
Oriental Mindoro	1st	Charity Leviste	Lakas	1
Oriental Mindoro	2nd	Alfonso Umali Jr.	Liberal	1
Palawan	1st	Vicente Sandoval	Lakas	3
Palawan	2nd	Abraham Mitra	LDP	1
Pampanga	1st	Francis Nepomuceno	NPC	2
Pampanga	2nd	Zenaida Cruz-Ducut	NPC	3
Pampanga	3rd	Oscar Samson Rodriguez	Lakas	3
Pampanga	4th	Juan Pablo Bondoc	NPC	2
Pangasinan	1st	Arthur Celeste	Independent	1
Pangasinan	2nd	Amado Espino Jr.	Lakas	1
Pangasinan	3rd	Generoso Tulagan	NPC	2
Pangasinan	4th	Jose de Venecia Jr.	Lakas	1
Pangasinan	5th	Mark Cojuangco	NPC	1
Pangasinan	6th	Conrado Estrella III	NPC	1
Parañaque	Lone	Eduardo Zialcita	Lakas	1
Pasay	Lone	Consuelo Dy	Lakas	1
Pasig	Lone	Henry Lanot (Note: Henry Lanot was removed by the House of Representatives Electoral Tribunal on January 22, 2004, after an electoral protest.)	LDP	2
Pasig	Lone	Noel Cariño (Note: Noel Cariño took office on June 11, 2004, after winning an electoral protest against Henry Lanot.)	Lakas	0
Quezon	1st	Rafael Nantes	Liberal	2
Quezon	2nd	Lynnette Punzalan	Lakas	1
Quezon	3rd	Aleta Suarez	Liberal	1
Quezon	4th	Georgilu Yumul-Hermida	PMP	1
Quezon City	1st	Reynaldo Calalay (Note: Reynaldo Calalay died on January 11, 2003.)	LDP	3
Quezon City	2nd	Ismael Mathay III	Independent	1
Quezon City	3rd	Maria Theresa Defensor	Lakas	1
Quezon City	4th	Nanette Castelo-Daza	Lakas	1
Quirino	Lone	Junie Cua	Liberal	1
Rizal	1st	Jack Duavit	NPC	1
Rizal	2nd	Isidro Rodriguez Jr.	NPC	2
Romblon	Lone	Perpetuo Ylagan	Lakas	1
Samar	1st	Reynaldo Uy	Liberal	1
Samar	2nd	Antonio Nachura	Liberal	2
San Juan	Lone	Ronaldo Zamora	PMP	1
Sarangani	Lone	Erwin Chiongbian	Lakas	1
Siquijor	Lone	Orlando Fua Jr.	Lakas	2
Sorsogon	1st	Francis Escudero	NPC	2
Sorsogon	2nd	Jose Solis	Independent	1
South Cotabato	1st	Darlene Antonino Custodio	NPC (Note: Also affiliated with the Achievers with Integrity Movement.)	1
South Cotabato	2nd	Arthur Pingoy Jr.	NPC	1
Southern Leyte	Lone	Aniceto Saludo Jr.	LDP	2
Sultan Kudarat	Lone	Angelo Montilla	NPC	3
Sulu	1st	Hussin Ututalum Amin	LDP (Note: Also affiliated with the Nationalist People's Coalition.)	2
Sulu	2nd	Abdulmunir Arbison	LDP	1
Surigao del Norte	1st	Glenda Ecleo	Lakas	1
Surigao del Norte	2nd	Ace Barbers	Lakas	2
Surigao del Sur	1st	Prospero Pichay Jr.	Lakas	2
Surigao del Sur	2nd	Jesnar Falcon	NPC	3
Taguig–Pateros	Lone	Alan Peter Cayetano	Lakas	2
Tarlac	1st	Gilbert Teodoro	NPC	2
Tarlac	2nd	Benigno Aquino III	Liberal	2
Tarlac	3rd	Jesli Lapus	NPC	2
Tawi-Tawi	Lone	Soraya Jaafar	Lakas	1
Valenzuela	1st	Win Gatchalian	NPC	1
Valenzuela	2nd	Magi Gunigundo	Lakas	2
Zambales	1st	James Gordon Jr.	Lakas	3
Zambales	2nd	Ruben Torres	NPC	1
Zamboanga City	Lone	Celso Lobregat	LDP	2
Zamboanga del Norte	1st	Romeo Jalosjos Sr. (Note: Romeo Jalosjos Sr. was removed on April 23, 2002, after the Supreme Court upheld his conviction for rape.)	NPC	3
Zamboanga del Norte	1st	Cecilia Jalosjos-Carreon (Note: Cecilia Jalosjos-Carreon was elected on August 26, 2002, to succeed Romeo Jalosjos Sr.. She took office on September 2, 2002.)	Reporma	0
Zamboanga del Norte	2nd	Roseller Barinaga	NPC	2
Zamboanga del Norte	3rd	Angel Carloto	Lakas	1
Zamboanga del Sur	1st	Isidoro Real Jr.	Lakas	1
Zamboanga del Sur	2nd	Nenet San Juan	Lakas	1
Zamboanga Sibugay	Lone	Belma Cabilao	Lakas	1
Party-list		Dioscoro Granada (Note: Dioscoro Granada took office on July 28, 2003.)	ABA	0
Party-list		Patricia Sarenas (Note: Patricia Sarenas took office on July 28, 2003.)	Abanse	0
Party-list		Etta Rosales (Note: Etta Rosales took office on August 27, 2001.)	Akbayan	0
Party-list		Mario Aguja (Note: Mario Aguja took office on November 25, 2002.)	Akbayan	0
Party-list		Mujiv Hataman (Note: Mujiv Hataman took office on July 28, 2003.)	AMIN	0
Party-list		Ernesto Pablo (Note: Ernesto Pablo took office on February 6, 2002.)	APEC	0
Party-list		Edgar Valdez (Note: Edgar Valdez took office on November 25, 2002.)	APEC	0
Party-list		Sunny Rose Madamba (Note: Sunny Rose Madamba took office on November 25, 2002.)	APEC	0
Party-list		Satur Ocampo (Note: Satur Ocampo took office on August 20, 2001.)	Bayan Muna	0
Party-list		Crispin Beltran (Note: Crispin Beltran took office on August 20, 2001, but later resigned on November 1, 2003.)	Bayan Muna	0
Party-list		Liza Maza (Note: Liza Maza took office on August 20, 2001, but later resigned on November 1, 2003.)	Bayan Muna	0
Party-list		Joel Virador (Note: Joel Virador took office on November 17, 2003, to succeed Crispin Beltran.)	Bayan Muna	0
Party-list		Siegfried Deduro (Note: Siegfried Deduro took office on November 17, 2003, to succeed Liza Maza.)	Bayan Muna	0
Party-list		Rene Velarde (Note: Rene Velarde took office on July 28, 2003.)	Buhay	0
Party-list		Christian Señeres (Note: Christian Señeres took office on December 15, 2003.)	Buhay	0
Party-list		Benjamin Cruz (Note: Benjamin Cruz took office on August 27, 2001.)	Butil	0
Party-list		Leonila Chavez (Note: Leonila Chavez took office on November 25, 2002.)	Butil	0
Party-list		Joel Villanueva (Note: Joel Villanueva took office on February 6, 2002.)	CIBAC	0
Party-list		Maria Blanca Kim Bernardo-Lokin (Note: Maria Blanca Kim Bernardo-Lokin took office on November 25, 2002.)	CIBAC	0
Party-list		Emerito Calderon (Note: Emerito Calderon took office on July 28, 2003.)	Cocofed	0
Party-list		Rene Magtubo (Note: Rene Magtubo took office on July 28, 2003.)	PM	0
Party-list		Jose Virgilio Bautista (Note: Jose Virgilio Bautista took office on July 28, 2003.)	Sanlakas	0

== See also ==
- Congress of the Philippines
- Senate of the Philippines
- House of Representatives of the Philippines
- 2001 Philippine general election
