= 2006 state of emergency in the Philippines =

Week-long period after an alleged coup attempt against President Gloria Arroyo

The Philippines was under a state of emergency, announced by presidential spokesperson Ignacio Bunye on the morning of February 24, 2006, by the virtue of Proclamation No. 1017. This occurred after the government claimed that it foiled an alleged coup d'état attempt against the rule of President Gloria Macapagal Arroyo earlier that same day. State security services also claimed that it had arrested a general who was involved in the coup attempt.

The state of national emergency also led to a temporary suspension of lower-level education classes and an immediate revocation on all licenses and permits to hold demonstrations and protests. The government also suspended all public activities on the same day and even on succeeding days. Under the provisions of the 1987 Constitution, the government was allowed at the moment to detain anyone indefinitely without the privilege of the writ of habeas corpus.

President Arroyo assured Filipinos that the situation was under control and the state of emergency would not be abused.

Arroyo had justified the declaration of a state of emergency with her statement of "clear and present danger to our Republic that we have discovered and thwarted." Critics claimed that this was an attempt by Arroyo to seize political power due to her sagging influence and popularity, and some drew similarities to the actions of her predecessor, Ferdinand Marcos, when he declared martial law in 1972.

On March 3, 2006 (one week after the proclamation), by the virtue of Proclamation No. 1021, the President lifted the state of emergency.

== Previous incidents ==
The coup attempt follows the 2003 Oakwood mutiny where President Arroyo, certain members of her cabinet, and the military were charged with corruption and the Hello Garci scandal, where in 2004, Arroyo and certain election officials were charged with electoral fraud in the 2004 presidential elections.

This also comes after Executive Order No. 464, where the President forbade government officials under the Executive branch to attend Filipino Congressional hearings, and the Calibrated Pre-Emptive Response, where street protests were disallowed without securing a rally permit.

This led to a drop at the president's popularity ratings from +28% right after EDSA II to -30% by December 2005.

== Timeline of events leading up to the proclamation ==
Oplan HACKLE
Date	February 22, 2006 – February 24, 2006 (2 days)
Location	Various places in the Philippines
Result	Arrest of leaders; Declaration of state of emergency.

Belligerents
Magdalo Troops; New Peoples Army	(Philippines) Philippine Government

Commanders and leaders
Brigadier Gen. Danilo Lim; Various Magdalo Leaders; Communist leaders	(Philippines) Philippine President Gloria Macapagal Arroyo (Philippines) Defense Secretary Avelino Cruz (Philippines) General Generoso S. Senga

The coup was first reported when 14 junior military officers were arrested for plotting a coup on February 22. Around midnight of the 24th, many military vehicles were seen entering Fort Bonifacio in Taguig. Then, at 2:00 a.m., several more vehicles were seen entering Camp Aguinaldo on EDSA. Brigadier General Danilo D. Lim of the Scout Rangers was put under the custody of the Armed Forces of the Philippines.

Former President Joseph Estrada was awoken by the police around 3:00 a.m. in San Juan Medical Center and was ordered to return to his resthouse in Tanay, Rizal. He did not follow the request of the police, because it has no authority from the Sandiganbayan, which was trying him on corruption charges. He said that "Magkakamatayan kami" (over my dead body). His eye operation succeeded despite the political unrest within Metro Manila.

Hours later, large demonstrations were held at EDSA Shrine, the site of the first People Power movement in 1986. The presidential residence at Malacañang was placed under heavy guard after a lacquer thinner bomb exploded outside of the building on February 23. The coup is part of a plot codenamed "Oplan HACKLE."

Arroyo claimed that the coup was a plan between right-wing factions in the military and leftist anarchists, a highly questionable claim since it has been pointed out that both sides have fought each other in the past, and would make unlikely allies.

By mid-morning, President Gloria Macapagal Arroyo declared a moratorium on all school activities from elementary to college level, issued through the Department of Education and the Commission on Higher Education. Around 11:25 a.m., Arroyo issued Proclamation No. 1017 on national television, placing the entire nation under a state of emergency in an attempt to quell the rebellion — sparking fears that it could lead to the introduction of martial law. General Order No. 5 was issued by the President to implement Proclamation No. 1017, ordering the Armed Forces of the Philippines to "maintain the peace and order of the country and to protect it from terrorism or chaos."

The Proclamation effectively cancelled all rally permits everywhere, and according to interpretations by the Arroyo administration, legalized arrest without a warrant.

== Events after the proclamation ==
The EDSA Shrine protesters were dispersed by the police by noontime. Some made their way to La Salle Green Hills while others went to the annual wreath-laying ceremony at Ninoy Aquino's monument on Ayala Avenue in Makati, the metro's central business district.

On the other side of EDSA, protesters led by University of the Philippines Professor Randy David were violently dispersed by the security forces at the EDSA-Kamuning intersection. David and Argee Guevarra were arrested and was charged with inciting to sedition in Camp Karingal in Quezon City. He was later released by nighttime, with all of the charges dropped. Ronald Llamas, a leader of the center-left Akbayan party, was arrested as well.

Around 3:30 p.m. demonstrators from different sectors gathered around at the Ninoy Aquino Monument in Makati to celebrate the 20th anniversary of the 1986 People Power Revolution. Prominent personalities like former President Corazon Aquino and her daughter Kris Aquino, Senate President Franklin Drilon, former Vice President Teofisto Guingona, Bishop Teodoro Bacani and Bishop Oscar Cruz, as well as other senators like Aquilino Pimentel, Jr. took part. Protesters believed that Makati would be a safe gathering place because it was governed by oppositionist Mayor Jejomar Binay. However, numerous police personnel were deployed in the area. The traditional throwing of confetti was carried out by some building occupants and a helicopter. The rally was dispersed by the Philippine National Police around 7:30 p.m., contrary to the statement of the police which said that the protesters "voluntarily" left the site.

=== Military movements ===
On the morning of February 26, the Armed Forces denied the text messages stating that there would be unusual military movements. Malacañang said that those statements who came from Mayor J. V. Ejercito of San Juan, Metro Manila are not true. Mayor Ejercito denied the information that came from Malacañang. Malacañang also said that there are no unauthorized troop movements.

==== Fort Bonifacio crisis ====
At around 6:00 p.m. on February 26 Maj. Gen. Renato Miranda was either relieved from his position as Commandant of the Philippine Marines or was requested to resign. Philippine Navy Chief Vice Admiral Mateo Mayuga and Malacañang said that Miranda asked to be relieved for personal reasons, while others perceived it as his termination. He was replaced by Brig. Gen. Nelson Allaga as Acting Commandant of Philippine Marines. Colonel Ariel Querubin protested these moves by the Navy, and some marines went to the camp chapel of Fort Bonifacio to start a prayer vigil in protest that could have led to a "withdrawal of support". Presidential Chief-of-Staff Mike Defensor said the decision was within the military, thus Malacañang had no influence on the matter. He also said that media should not cover the events happening at Fort Bonifacio; major privately owned stations defied the suggestion and covered the situation.

The Armed Forces implemented countermeasures, such as blocking Lawton Avenue (the main road to the Fort) from possible protesters, turning off the lights in the Fort, and deploying loyalist troops. However, former President Corazon Aquino, former Vice President Teofisto Guingona, Jr., Senator Ramon Magsaysay, Jr., Representatives Benigno Aquino III and Imee Marcos, and De La Salle University President Bro. Armin Luistro, FSC, went to Fort Bonifacio with other prominent opposition members, but the Civil Disturbance Team arrived at 7:05 pm to control civilians. Civil society held their prayer vigils in front of the Fort, led by the La Salle Brothers.

That evening, Capt. Geronimo said that the crisis was over. The newly appointed Commandant of Philippine Marine Corps, Brig. Gen. Nelson Allaga, assumed control of all the marines, and Querubin was later discharged from the services, bidding his comrades goodbye in Marawi City. Brig. Gen. Allaga also announced their situation was over and that the whole Philippine Marine Corps will still will follow the "chain of command" despite earlier events. This decision came from a gentleman's agreement by officers to vote on whether or not to follow the chain of command, with a result of nine against six.

After the crisis, most people in front of Fort Bonifacio left, and as a response Malacañang suspended classes on all levels the following day. Col. Querubin was relieved from his position as commander of the 1st Marine Brigade, with Lt. Col. Luisito Marcelino as his temporary replacement.

=== Arrests ===
After the Makati rally, the Department of Justice sued former Senator Gregorio Honasan, who had previously led coups against the Aquino government in the 1980s, along with the other six leaders of the RAM (Rebolusyonaryong Alyansang Makabansâ, "Nationalist Revolutionary Alliance"), for the 2003 Oakwood mutiny. On February 25, ANAK-PAWIS Party-list Representative Crispin Beltran was served an arrest warrant and taken in for questioning under state of emergency laws for his alleged role in a 1985 coup against Ferdinand Marcos. This was considered a highly unusual and controversial move since the alleged crime was from twenty years prior. Beltrán responded, "They say this is just an invitation but I think this is an arrest. Warrantless arrest, I think there will be more to come." Beltrán underwent inquest by the police on February 27, and was charged with "inciting to rebellion" and "conspiracy to commit rebellion."

Police next unsuccessfully tried to arrest Bayan Muna Party-list Representative Satur Ocampo. The former chief of the Philippine Constabulary and former national security adviser to former President Fidel V. Ramos retired General Ramon Montaño, was also arrested by the police. He was charged with inciting sedition, while former Police General Rex Piad was also arrested, but it was later revealed that there was no evidence to support the act.

==== "Batasan 5" ====
On that same day, the PNP–CIDG filed cases against 51 alleged communists, including five party-list representatives (Beltrán, Ocampo, Teodoro Casiño, Joel Virador and Liza Maza), at the DOJ in violation of Article 134, in relation to Article 135 of the Revised Penal Code (rebellion/insurrection). A panel of prosecutors were assigned to the group, dubbed the "Batasan 5", but failed to find them guilty. Minority floor leader Rep. Francis Escudero of Sorsogon appealed to House Speaker Jose de Venecia to halt the arrests of congressmen during the state of emergency. De Venecia assured protection for the members of the House, and offered his office and conference room as lodging. For 70 days, the five took refuge in the House of Representatives. On May 11, the DOJ filed new charges against the Batasan 5 for plotting to instigate a rebellion on Labor Day.

=== Freedom of the press ===
During a state of emergency, the government could control public utilities, which includes media, according to the constitution. Gonzalez assured Filipinos that the government would not use these powers unnecessarily. However, there were reports that the Arroyo government suppressed the freedom of the press.

On February 25, the PNP–CIDG raided The Daily Tribune for alleged assistance to leftists and rebel military groups.

There were also reports that the military surrounded the ABS-CBN compound in Mother Ignacia, Diliman, Quezon City. However, they left the premises hours later.

Samahang Plaridel, National Union of Journalists of the Philippines, and Committee to Protect Journalists expressed disappointment with Proclamation No. 1017, calling it a suppression of press freedom.

== Lifting of the proclamation ==
On March 1, Ash Wednesday, Arroyo has stated that she will lift the "state of emergency" soon, perhaps by the end of the first week of March. The President gives a 24- to 72-hour time frame to the Secretary of Justice, Secretary of National Defense, and to the Chief of Philippine National Police to give reports to her before lifting the state of emergency.

On March 3, by the virtue of Proclamation No. 1021, the Philippine President Gloria Macapagal Arroyo officially concluded state of emergency in the Philippines. The state of emergency (Proclamation No. 1017) lasted one week since February 24, 2006. According to her, the state of emergency protected major democratic institutions and even the media. This led to lowering of security alerts of the Philippine National Police and Armed Forces of the Philippines.

== Reactions ==
=== Anti-Arroyo ===
A number of observers have drawn parallels between the actions of President Arroyo and those of Ferdinand Marcos. Benito Lim, Professor of Political Science at the University of the Philippines, stated, "This is suppression of all freedom. It is in violation of the constitution and the bill of rights. This is the beginning of using stronger measures to quell dissent against the government. Their justification is reminiscent of Marcos when he proclaimed martial law."

On February 24, 2006, the Philippine National Police violently dispersed protesters from EDSA. The Catholic Bishops' Conference of the Philippines denounced the violence, and advised the President to be calm in handling the protests. Archbishop Oscar Cruz of Dagupan and other bishops were not happy of the proclamation from the President stating that the Philippines is under a state of emergency, however the CBCP wants the people to be vigilant of the situation.

Former President Ramos said that he was disappointed of the declaration of state of emergency to just prevent an uprising of a small faction of the military, saying it was overkill. The former President described his cold relationship to President Arroyo as "Waning, waning."

Former President Joseph Estrada appealed to Arroyo to remove the declaration of State of Emergency as it will not benefit most of the people in the country. He also condemns "baseless arrests" and the alleged dictatorship rule.

Fernando Poe, Jr.'s widow Susan Roces said that last week, President Arroyo said that she is the best President of the country, "Is this the best?" Roces is referring to the speech of Arroyo regarding a meeting with the Foreign Correspondents Association of the Philippines (FOCAP) saying: "And let me also make clear: I believe I am the best person to lead this nation through this transition. I was elected to make difficult decisions, and I have made them. Not without mistakes on my part, and certainly not without significant criticism. But I have the experience of hindsight, and I aim to fulfill my term with a steady hand on the helm."

The Lasallian Brothers issued a letter about the current political crisis in the country. One of their main points is: "We wish to reaffirm that the most peaceful and expedient way to resolve the current crisis is for President Gloria Macapagal Arroyo to make the supreme sacrifice and to resign voluntarily, an option fully in consonance with the Constitution, in order to pave the way for a smooth and peaceful transition of power." which calls for the resignation of President Arroyo.

=== Pro-Arroyo ===
In the statement of Presidential Spokesperson Sec. Ignacio Bunye, he said that "The actions of the government have been well calibrated and there is no overkill... Had the President not acted as she did, we would now be under a rightist-communist junta."

Vice President Noli de Castro affirmed President Arroyo's declaration. He said, "I respect the right of the President to declare a state of emergency in order to preserve the peace, maintain law and order, and ensure the protection of human rights and civil liberties of the people for as long as there is imminent threat to public safety."

However, on March 1, 2006, de Castro wants to remove the state of emergency since "there is no more emergency", according to him.

== Legalities ==
The President cited Article 7 Section 18 of the Constitution which states that: "The President...whenever necessary... may call out the armed forces to prevent or suppress... rebellion..." and Article 12 Section 17 of the Constitution which states that: "In times of national emergency, when the public interest so requires, the State may, during the emergency and under reasonable terms prescribed by it, temporarily take over or direct the operations of privately owned public utilities or business affected with public interest." Sec. Gonzalez of the Department of Justice said that the government had not yet reached that point.

Lawyers question Proclamation No. 1017 stating that the whole nation is under State of Emergency and other actions of the government in the Supreme Court of the Philippines by issuing multiple petitions.

== Court Martial ==
Days after the lifting of the declaration of a state of emergency, several Scout Ranger officers, including Lamitan Hero, Army Captain Ruben Guinolbay, were ordered investigated and detained.

Eventually, 25 Scout Rangers officers were arrested but were charged only on August 2, 2006, after several months in detention. Also charged were several Marine officers allegedly involved in the Fort Bonifacio incident.

Those charged were Brigadier General Danilo Lim, Lieutenant Colonels Nestor Flordeliza and Edmundo Malabanjot; Majors Jason Aquino, and Jose Leomar Doctolero; Captains James Sababan, Montano Almodovar, Joey Fontiveros, Ruben Guinolbay, Isagani Criste, William Upano, Dante Langkit, Allan Aurino, and Frederick Sales; and First Lieutenants Ervin Divinagracia, Jacon Cordero, Homer Estolas, Sandro Sereno and Richiemel Caballes of the Philippine Army Scout Rangers. The indicted Marine officers are Major General Renato Miranda, Medal of Valor awardees Col. Ariel Querubin, Lt. Col. Custodio Parcon; Colonels Orlando de Leon, Januario Caringal and Armando Bañez; Lieutenant Colonels Valentin Hizon, Romulo Gualdrapa, and Achilles Segumalian; Maj. Francisco Domingo Fernandez; and 1Lt. Belinda Ferrer.

The pretrial investigation panel formed by the Armed Forces of the Philippines, conducted by the Judge Advocate General's Office and headed by Col. Al Pereras recommended the dismissal of the charge of mutiny but the retention of charges for conduct unbecoming an officer and a gentleman for a few of the detained officers. All charges against Capt. Guinolbay were recommended dismissed. The same however, was overturned by Chief of Staff Hermogenes Esperon, allegedly upon the recommendation of the Staff Judge Advocate, even as Marine Lt. Cols Valentin Hizon and Romulo Gualdrapa were dropped as accused by Gen. Esperon's exercise of discretion.

== See also ==
- Hello Garci scandal
- Oakwood mutiny
- Martial Law in the Philippines
- Proclamation No. 55
- People Power Revolution
