= Noel Felongco =

Filipino lawyer and civil servant

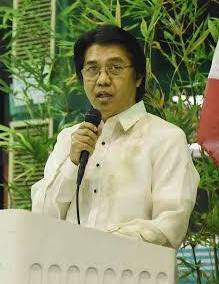

Lead Convenor of National Anti-Poverty Commission
- In office October 31, 2018 – June 30, 2022
- President: Rodrigo Duterte
- Preceded by: Liza Maza
- Succeeded by: Lope Santos III

Chairperson of the Presidential Commission for the Urban Poor
- In office February 1, 2018 – October 31, 2018
- President: Rodrigo Duterte
- Preceded by: Terry Ridon
- Succeeded by: Alvin Feliciano

Undersecretary of Environment and Natural Resources for Solid Waste Management and Local Government Units Concerns
- In office November 16, 2016 – February 1, 2018
- President: Rodrigo Duterte
- Preceded by: Position created
- Succeeded by: Benny Antiporda

Commissioner of the National Commission on Indigenous Peoples
- In office 2008–2010
- President: Gloria Macapagal Arroyo

Member of the Cotabato City Council
- In office 1998–2004

Personal details
- Born: Noel Kinazo Felongco Davao City, Philippines
- Party: Partido Demokratiko Pilipino
- Education: Notre Dame University
- Occupation: Professor, Government official
- Profession: Lawyer

Noel Kinazo Felongco is a Filipino lawyer and government official who currently serves as the Lead Convenor of the National Anti-Poverty Commission of the Philippines under the Duterte administration from 2018 to 2022. He previously served as a chairperson of the Presidential Commission for the Urban Poor and as an undersecretary of the Department of Environment and Natural Resources (DENR).

== Early life and education ==
Felongco grew up in Norala, South Cotabato and Cotabato City where he graduated with a bachelor's degree on philosophy and law at Notre Dame University. He was admitted to the Philippine Bar on March 14, 1994.

== Career ==
Felongco started as a president of the Central Visayas chapter of Partido Demokratiko Pilipino–Laban ng Bayan (PDP–Laban) and later on as a two-term councilor of Cotabato City from 1998 to 2004.

From 2008 to 2010, he was tapped to serve as one of the commissioners of the National Commission on Indigenous Peoples (NCIP) under the administration of then president Gloria Macapagal Arroyo.

On November 16, 2016, he was appointed by President Duterte to serve as the Undersecretary for Solid Waste Management and Local Government Units Concerns in DENR. He was later appointed as the Chairperson of the Presidential Commission for the Urban Poor (PCUP).

He was appointed as the Lead Convenor of the National Anti-Poverty Commission on October 31, 2018, replacing Liza Maza who resigned on August 20, 2018.

Political offices
Preceded by Terry Ridon	Chairperson of the Presidential Commission for the Urban Poor; 2018–2018	Succeeded by Alvin Feliciano
Preceded by Liza Maza	Lead Convenor of the National Anti-Poverty Commission (Philippines); 2018–present	Incumbent
