= Joel Virador =

Filipino human rights advocate, activist and politician

The Honorable Joel Virador
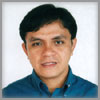
- Official portrait, 2004

Member of the Philippine House of Representatives for Bayan Muna Partylist
- In office November 7, 2003 – June 30, 2007

Personal details
- Born: March 5, 1967 Kidapawan City, Philippines
- Died: May 7, 2019 (aged 52) Davao City, Philippines
- Party: Bayan Muna
- Spouse: Imelda Suarez Lumayag
- Education: Notre Dame of Kidapawan College

Joel G. Virador (March 5, 1967 – May 7, 2019) was a Filipino human rights advocate, activist, and politician who was partylist representative for Bayan Muna in the 12th and 13th Congresses of the Philippines.

== Early life and education ==
Virador was born on March 5, 1967, in Kidapawan, Cotabato to parents that trace their roots to Bohol.

He went to Notre Dame of Kidapawan College for his elementary, secondary, and college education. He graduated from college with a Bachelor of Science degree in Commerce Major in Accounting in 1987. While studying, he was the chairperson of that college's League of Filipino Students and secretary-general of the Bagong Alyansang Makabayan (BAYAN) in Cotabato.

== Activism ==
After graduation, Virador worked as a volunteer at the Task Force Detainees of the Philippines (TFDP). He later became the organization's regional director in Southern Mindanao from 1987 to 1995. In 1995, after eight years serving the TFDP, Virador was appointed secretary-general of Karapatan. After 5 years with Karapatan, Virador joined Bayan Muna in 2000 becoming the party's spokesperson in Southern Mindanao.

Virador, in 2002, was charged with rebellion after his name was linked to the alias of a New People's Army commander. The case was later dismissed. In 2005, police charged Virador with direct assault and illegal assembly after he led a labor strike in Sampaloc, Manila, on October 21, 2005. The court dismissed the charges in May 2006.

== Political career ==
Virador was nominated as Bayan Muna's 4th nominee for the 2001 Philippine House of Representatives elections.

On November 7, 2003, following the resignation of Crispin Beltran, Virador assumed the vacated party-list seat. While in Congress, Virador stood up to deliver privilege speeches questioning the legality of joint RP-US Balikatan military exercises in Mindanao, the violation of human rights of the civilian populace during military operations, and the problems of landlessness and displacement of peasant tillers and rural workers.

On February 24, 2004, Virador was nominated as Bayan Muna's 3rd nominee for the 2004 Philippine House of Representatives elections where he won a seat. During his stint in the 13th Congress of the Philippines, he was concerned mostly with issues of indigenous peoples, the Moros, and the environment. He also handled the party's issues on agriculture, women and privatization of water services. He was vice-chairperson of the House of Representatives' Mindanao Affairs Committee.

Bayan Muna opposed Gloria Macapagal Arroyo's presidency on claims of corruption due to the Hello Garci controversy, the fertilizer fund scam, allegations over widespread human rights abuses, including the State of Emergency in February 2006. During the suspension of freedoms, the 6 members were sought out with arrest warrants by the government and took refuge in Congress. Crispin Beltran was illegally arrested by state agents and was detained for more than a year. Virador was nabbed by state agents in Davao City. Thenceforth, the group of Bayan Muna, Anakpawis and Gabriela representatives -- Satur Ocampo, Teodoro Casiño, Virador, Liza Maza, Beltran and fellow Anakpawis Rafael Mariano became known as the Batasan 6.

== Personal life ==
Virador was married to Imelda Lumayag-Virador, an activist and Bayan Muna member. They had two children, daughter Joanna Paula Vasig, and son Harvey Rafael Virador.

== Death ==
Virador died on May 7, 2019, at Brokenshire Hospital in Davao City due to papillary carcinoma or thyroid cancer. He was first diagnosed sometime in 2013.
