= Oplan HACKLE =

Supposed plot by rebel soldiers in the Philippines to overthrow the Arroyo administration

- Part of the Communist rebellion in the Philippines
Date	February 22–24, 2006; Plot was uncovered by the Filipino Military.
Location	Various places in the Philippines
Result	Arrest of leaders; Declaration of state of emergency.

Belligerents
Magdalo troops New People's Army	(Philippines) Philippine Government

Commanders and leaders
Danilo Lim	(Philippines) Gloria Macapagal Arroyo

Oplan HACKLE was a supposed plot by rebel soldiers in the Philippines to overthrow the Arroyo administration, foiled by the Armed Forces of the Philippines (AFP) on February 24, 2006 (see 2006 state of emergency in the Philippines). Allegedly, the four-phase plot included a mass jailbreak of Magdalo mutineers and the unfolding of anti-government posters during a Philippine Military Academy reunion.

A document named Oplan Hackle I was discovered by authorities. The document detailed plans on an attack and bombing of the Philippine Alumni Homecoming in Baguio.

The rebel Magdalo soldiers are said to be working with the New People's Army, a communist military organization — The AFP claims "HACKLE" is an abbreviated form of "hammer and sickle".

In October 2010, Benigno Aquino III extended conditional amnesty to military officials and soldiers implicated in Oplan HACKLE.
