= Philippine Executive Order 464 =

Executive Order No. 464 (popularly known as E.O. 464) is a controversial executive order issued in the Philippines on September 26, 2005, by President Gloria Macapagal Arroyo that prevents cabinet members, police and military generals, senior national security officials, and "such other officers as may be determined by the President" to attend congressional hearings unless the President gives permission to those who will attend the said proceedings.

The order was created as two officers from the military appeared during the hearings of the Senate Committee on National Defense on the Hello Garci scandal. It also comes a week after National Security Adviser Norberto Gonzales appeared in a Senate hearing regarding the contract of the government with the Washington-based law firm Venable LLP.

Arroyo revoked the order on March 5, 2008.

== Justification by the Executive Branch ==
To justify the constitutionality of the decree, President Arroyo invoked "the constitutional guarantees of the separation of powers of the Executive Branch, Legislative and Judicial branches of government" and cited Article VI Section 22 of the Philippine Constitution, which permits department heads, cabinet members and other officials under the Executive Branch to appear at congressional hearings with the consent of the President.

== Petition ==
The Integrated Bar of the Philippines (IBP), Bayan Muna, Courage, Counsels for the Defense of Liberties, former Solicitor General Frank Chavez, Alternative Law Groups Inc., 17 senators, and PDP Laban petition before the Philippine Supreme Court to scrap the Executive Order.

In the 26-page petition of the IBP lawyers, Executive Order 464 is a "derogation of the legislative power to investigate." Furthermore, they said that the non-appearance of executive officials during congressional hearings by invoking Executive Order 464 hampered Congress investigation in aid of legislation, "thus petitioners' right to be informed of matters of public interest has been denied."

== Supreme Court decision ==
On April 20, 2006, in a 52-page en banc decision at a session in Baguio, the Supreme Court of the Philippines nullified two sections of the executive order namely Sections 2(B) and 3. These sections prohibit officials under the Executive Department from appearing on hearings of Congress without the consent of the President. However, the Supreme Court declared that Sections 1 and 2 are valid. This validity asserts the right of the President to forbid executive officials from attending at the hour of question of the Senate and the House of Representatives and the right to request for a closed-door session if the "security of the state or the public interest so requires."

== Revocation ==
The Catholic Bishops' Conference of the Philippines (CBCP) had asked the President to allow her subordinates to reveal any corrupt acts without being obstructed in their testimony no matter who is involved. Arroyo acceded to the request and revoked the order, announcing the revocation at a press conference at the Discovery Suites, Pasig. Present for the announcement were Arroyo, some members of her cabinet and several religious leaders (notably CBCP members).

== See also ==
- Executive privilege
- Philippine Proclamation 1017
