= Anakpawis =

Political party-list in the Philippines

Anakpawis Partylist
- Leader: Rafael V. Mariano
- Spokesperson: Wilson Baldonaza
- Founded: 2003
- Headquarters: Quezon City
- Ideology: National democracy
- Political position: Far-left
- National affiliation: Bayan; Makabayan; Kilusang Mayo Uno
- Colors: Red, Yellow

Website
- anakpawis.net

Anakpawis ("Toiling Masses") is a party-list in the Philippines. The party-list is the electoral wing of the radical trade union movement Kilusang Mayo Uno and the peasant group Kilusang Mangbubukid ng Pilipinas.

Known for its radical pro-labor and peasant stand, Anakpawis is known for its campaign for a ₱125 across-the-board wage increase for workers, as well as the genuine agrarian reform bill to redistribute land to landless peasants.

In the 2004 elections for the House of Representatives the party-list obtained 538,396 votes (4.2320% of the nationwide vote) and two seats (Crispin B. Beltran and Rafael V. Mariano). In the May 14, 2007 election, the party won 1 seat in the nationwide party-list vote.

Anakpawis is part of the party-list group Makabayan, with the parties Bayan Muna, GABRIELA, and more.

== Controversy ==
Ariel Casilao, a representative of the Anakpawis party-list, was arrested and charged on allegations of usurpation of authority.

Ariel Casilao and other representatives from the Makabayan bloc called for revisions to the party-list law to better ensure representation of workers, peasants, and other marginalized sectors.

== Electoral performance ==
Election	Votes	%	Seats
2004	538,396	4.23%	2
2007	370,261	2.32%	2
2010	447,201	1.50%	1
2013	321,110	1.17%	1
2016	367,376	1.13%	1
2019	145,915	0.53%	0
2022	81,436	0.22%	0

== Representatives to Congress ==
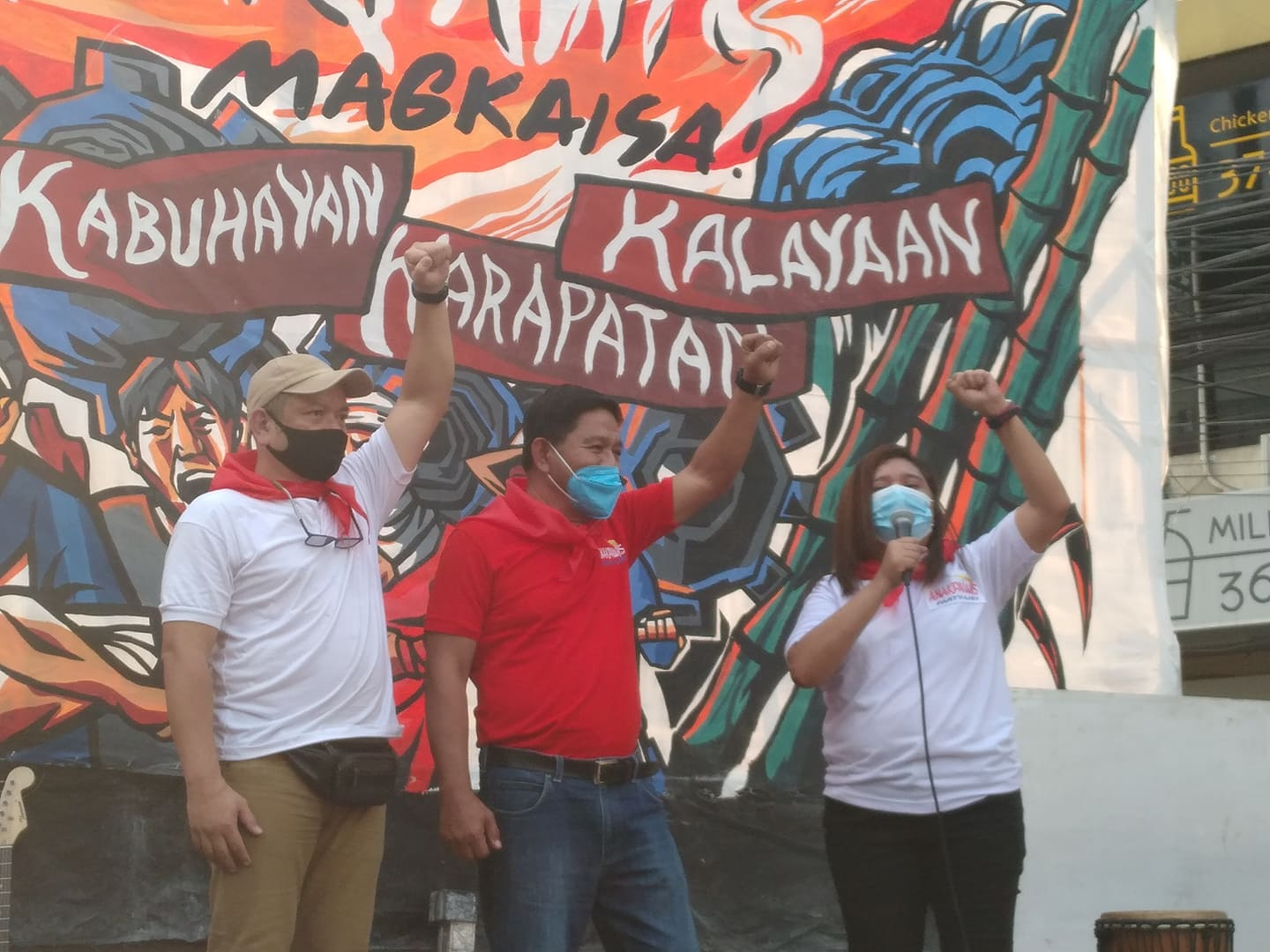
Anakpawis Partylist Nominees Doy Mariazeta, Paeng Mariano, Lana Linaban, Bonifacio Day 2021

- 13th Congress (2004–2007) - Crispin Beltran, Rafael V. Mariano
- 14th Congress (2007–2010) - Crispin Beltran (replaced by Rafael V. Mariano after his death in 2008), Joel Manglungsod
- 15th Congress (2010–2013) - Rafael V. Mariano
- 16th Congress (2013–2016) - Fernando Hicap
- 17th Congress (2016–2019) - Ariel Casilao
- 18th Congress (2019–2022) - None
- 19th Congress (2022–2025) - None

== See also ==
- Katipunan ng mga Anakpawis sa Pilipinas
