= Crispin Beltran =

Filipino trade unionist and politician (1933–2008)

The Honorable Crispin Beltran
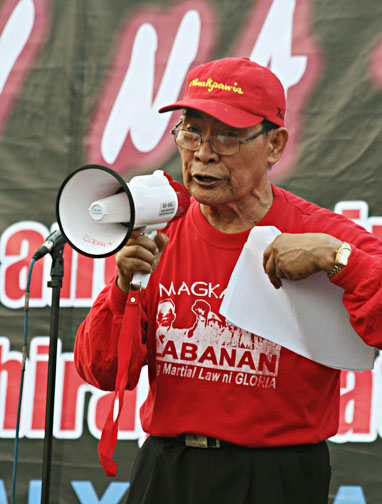

Member of the Philippine House of Representatives for Anakpawis
- In office June 30, 2004 – May 20, 2008 Serving with Rafael V. Mariano (2004–2007), Joel Manglungsod (2007–2008)

Member of the Philippine House of Representatives for Bayan Muna
- In office June 30, 2001 – June 30, 2004 Serving with Satur Ocampo (2001–2004), Liza Maza (2001–2004), Joel Virador (2003–2004)

Personal details
- Born: Crispin Bertiz Beltran; January 7, 1933 Bacacay, Albay, Insular Government of the Philippine Islands, U.S.
- Died: May 20, 2008 (aged 75) San Jose del Monte, Bulacan, Philippines
- Party: Bayan Muna (2001–2004); Anakpawis (2007–2008)
- Other political affiliations: Bagong Alyansang Makabayan: Kilusang Mayo Uno
- Spouse: Rosario “Ka Osang” Soto
- Education: University of the Philippines Diliman
- Profession: Labor leader

Crispin Bertiz Beltran (January 7, 1933 – May 20, 2008), also known as Ka Bel, was a Filipino labor leader and politician. A staunch critic of President Gloria Macapagal Arroyo, his imprisonment in 2006 and 2007 on disputed charges of rebellion and sedition drew international attention. He was a member of the 13th Congress of the Philippines with the Anakpawis ("Toiling Masses") party-list and former chair of Kilusang Mayo Uno (KMU), a militant and progressive labor movement.

== Labor leader ==
Beltran began his labor career in his 20s when he served as the president of the Yellow Taxi Drivers’ Union and the Amalgamated Taxi Drivers Federation from 1955 to 1963. He served as vice administrator of the Confederation of Labor Unions of the Philippines and was vice president of the Philippine Alliance of Nationalist Organizations from 1963 to 1972.

During the Marcos Martial Law regime, from August 1982 to 1984, he was arrested and detained at Camp Crame, Quezon City, and his 10 children lived on his small earnings from selling rubber slippers and selling fish in the market. Osang delivered his speeches at rallies, and eventually did volunteer work at the Task Force Detainees of the Philippines.

In 1984, when KMU president Felixberto Olalia died of pneumonia in his detention cell, Ka Osang successfully planned a daring escape plan amid his kidney ailment, but he endured blows, punches, and kicks from his guards. Beltran became a fugitive of justice in Central Luzon, and was protected by insurgents.

After Marcos's downfall in 1986, President Corazon Aquino ordered the release of Beltran and of all political prisoners. He joined the party-list elections as a second nominee of Bayan Muna in 2001 and won a seat in the House of Representatives. He won a second term in 2004 and a third term in 2007 as an Anakpawis representative.

Beltran joined the Kilusang Mayo Uno in 1985. He became the chairperson of the organization in 1986 following the murder of Rolando Olalia. From 1993 to 1999, Beltran was the chairperson of BAYAN.

== Detention and release ==
On February 25, 2006, Beltran was arrested shortly after a state of emergency was declared by President Gloria Macapagal Arroyo. He was charged with inciting to sedition. He was subsequently implicated in an alleged plot to overthrow the government of Arroyo.

An international campaign was organized calling for the immediate release of Beltran. One group, the 'Free Ka Bel Movement' has local chapters in Southern Tagalog, Davao and Cebu and international chapters in Hong Kong, Japan, US, Canada, Australia and Switzerland. Some 99 parliamentarians from across the world supported the release of Crispin Beltran coming from 11 countries and 13 parliaments, including the Netherlands, Cambodia, Burma, New Zealand, Belgium, Chile, the United Kingdom, Canada, Australia, the European Parliament, Switzerland, Denmark, and the Flemish Parliament. Beltran also drew support from Keith Locke, MP, Foreign Affairs Critic of the Green Party of New Zealand.

Beltran remained in detention until June 2007, when the Supreme Court of the Philippines voided the charges against Beltran and several other leaders affiliated with leftist groups.

On January 4, 2008, Beltran filed House Resolution 299 with the House of Representatives of the Philippines to investigate the murders and harassment of trade union / labor leaders in the Philippines. He cited the 2007 annual Survey of Trade Union Rights Violations of the International Trade Union Confederation: "33 of the total 144 cases of trade union killings worldwide happened in the Philippines; and 800 cases of beatings and torture of trade unionists in the country."

Beltran was hurt in a vehicular accident in October 2007 in Intramuros, Manila, when his Toyota Hi-Ace van was rammed by a Ford Everest sports utility vehicle. Beltran was at the Philippine General Hospital after having lacerations on his left eye and suffered nosebleed.

== Personal life and education ==
23 year old taxi driver Beltran first met then 15-year-old Rosario “Ka Osang” Soto (aged 68 at the time of Beltran's death) on November 10, 1956, after she cut classes and left her grandmother at Quiapo. Beltran drove Osang in his taxicab to his San Juan boarding house, and after 3 days thereat, her furious father beat up Beltran in front of her, and brought him to the San Juan municipal jail. Eventually, they had to get married, and had 10 children. Beltran was a cabbie by day and a University of the Philippines’ Asian Labor Education Center student by night. Beltran was baptized a Roman Catholic, but eventually grew up in the Philippine Independent Church.

== Death and legacy ==
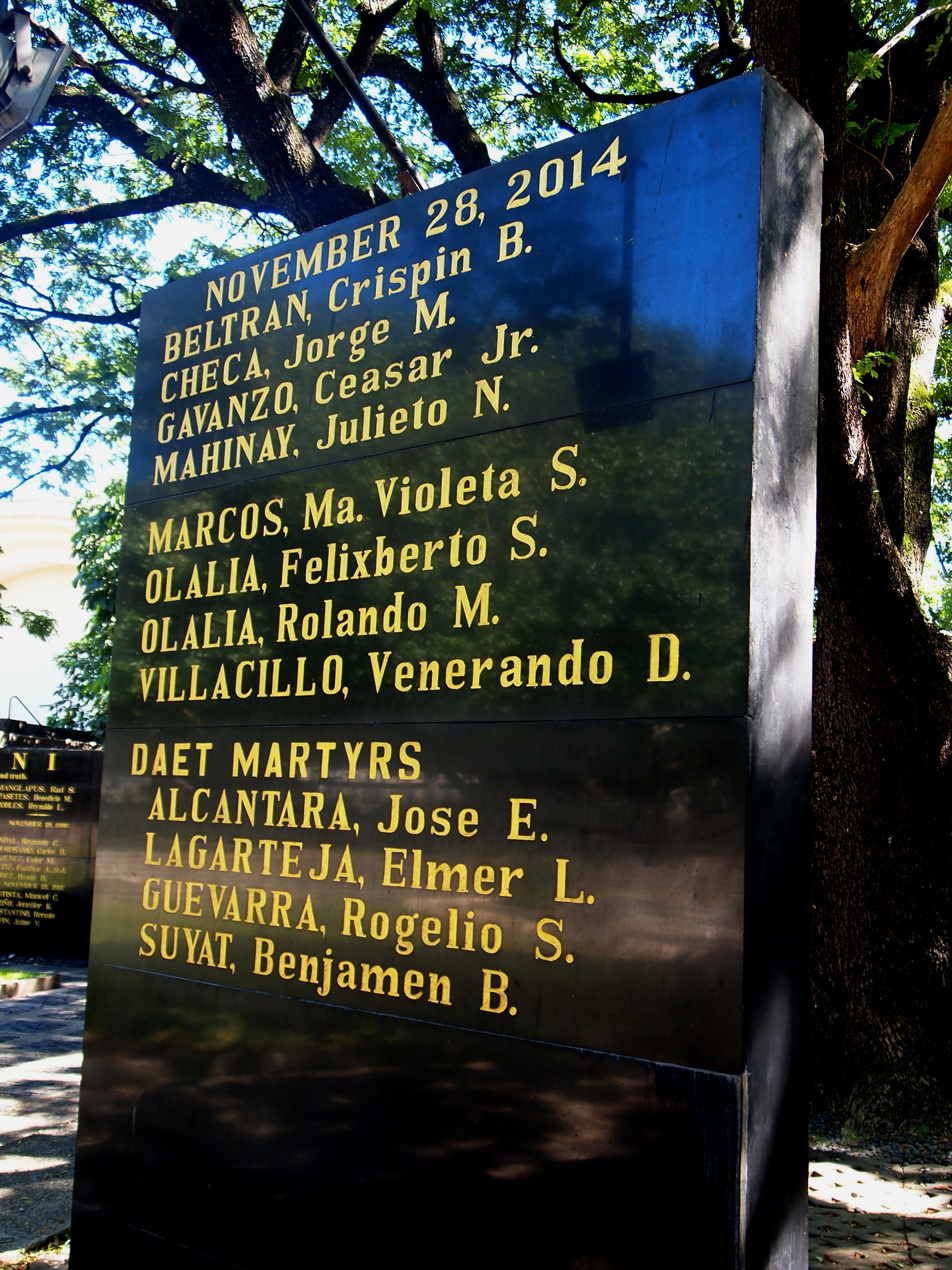
Detail of the Wall of Remembrance at the Bantayog ng mga Bayani, showing names from the 2014 batch of Bantayog Honorees, including that of Crispin Beltran.

On May 20, 2008, Beltran fell 14 feet from the roof of his Bulacan home, which he had been repairing. He sustained severe head injuries and was declared dead at 11:48 a.m. by attending physicians at the Far Eastern University hospital, aged 75. He was survived by his wife Rosario, with whom he had eleven children.

Upon his death, Beltran was lauded by his colleagues in the labor sector as the "Grand Old Man of Philippine labor". Malacañan Palace also released a statement through a spokesperson calling Beltran "one of the most respected labor leaders in the country" and a "vital figure" in Philippine labor.

In 2014, Beltran was honored at the Bantayog ng mga Bayani, alongside previous KMU leaders Felixberto Olalia Sr. and his son Rolando Olalia.
