= Satur Ocampo =

Filipino politician, activist, journalist and writer

The Honorable Satur Ocampo
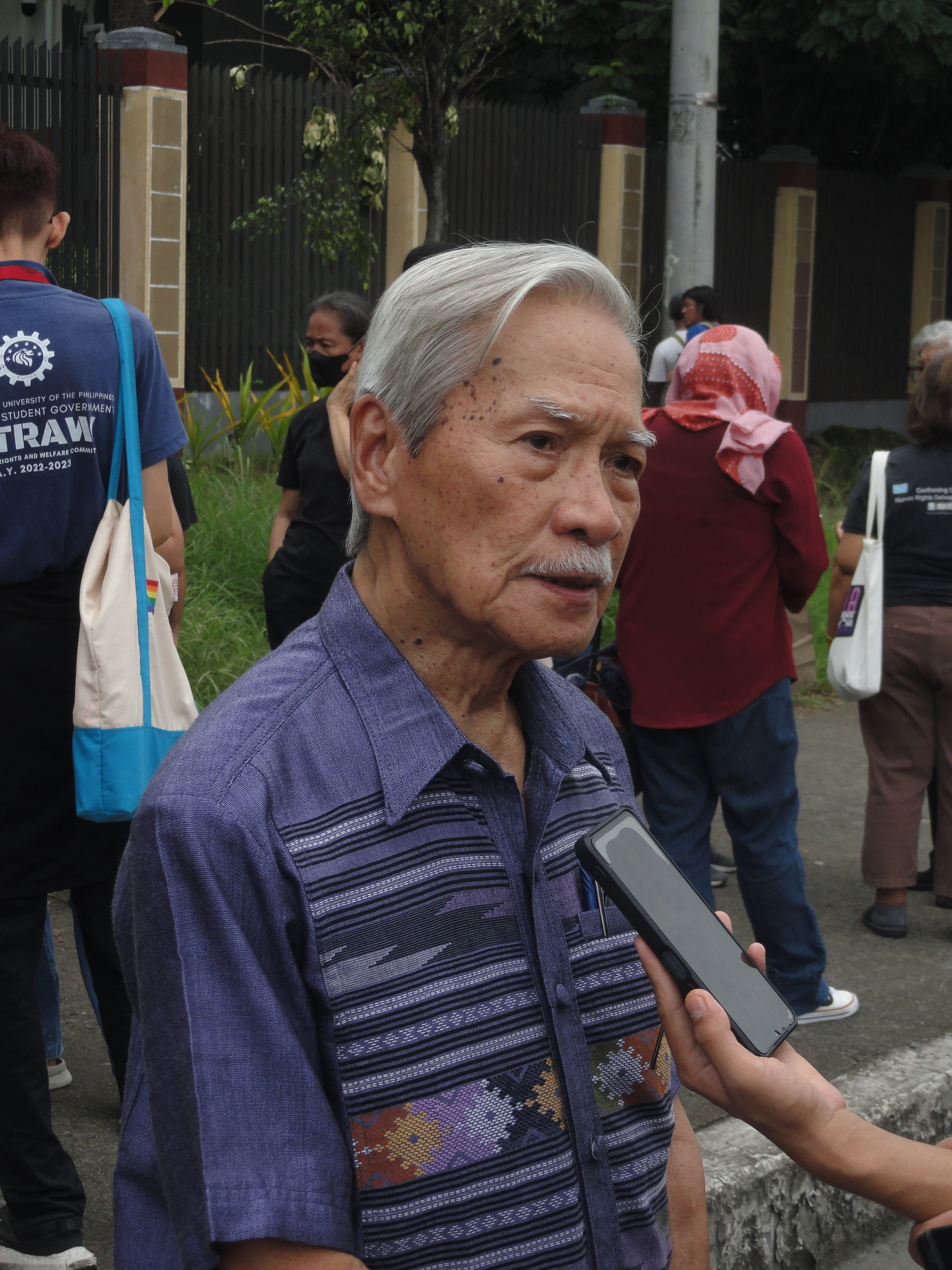
- Ocampo in 2024

Member of the Philippine House of Representatives for Bayan Muna party-list
- In office June 30, 2001 – June 30, 2010 Serving with Crispin Beltran (2001–2003), Liza Maza (2001–2004), Joel Virador (2003–2007), Teodoro Casiño (2004–2010), & Neri Colmenares (2009–2010)

Personal details
- Born: Saturnino Cunanan Ocampo; April 7, 1939 (age 87) Santa Rita, Pampanga, Philippine Commonwealth
- Party: Bayan Muna
- Other political affiliations: Makabayan (2009–present); National Democratic Front (1973–present)
- Spouses: Sheila Ocampo (separated); Carolina Malay
- Profession: Writer, journalist

Saturnino "Satur" Cunanan Ocampo (born April 7, 1939) is a Filipino politician, activist, journalist, and writer. He was among the longest-held political prisoners during the regime of President Ferdinand Marcos.

As party president and first nominee, he led the party-list group Bayan Muna in three successful elections in 2001, 2004, and 2007. He was a member of the House of Representatives, and Deputy Minority Leader in the 14th Congress of the Philippines. He has done work in human rights and other areas.

After his three terms as representative, he ran for senator in the May 2010 elections; then-Representative Liza Maza of the women's partylist group GABRIELA and Ocampo were fielded by the Makabayan coalition and were included as guest senatorial candidates of the Nacionalista Party, a mainstream Philippine political party whose presidential standard bearer, Senator Manny Villar, they supported.

After the elections, on August 21, 2010, Ocampo started a weekly opinion column in the Philippine Star titled "At Ground Level".

== Activism ==
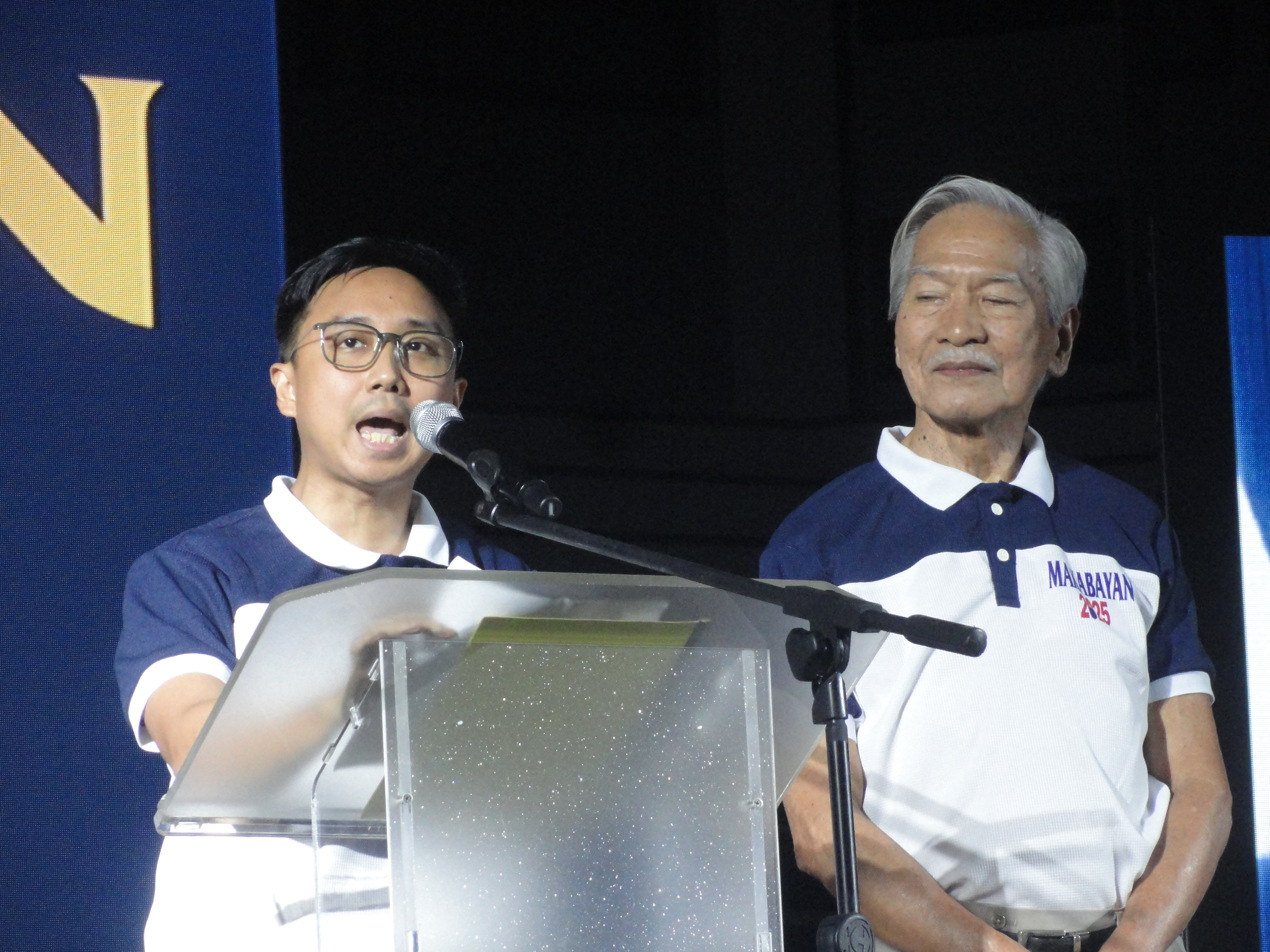
Ocampo and former Cong. Raoul Manuel during the Makabayan Coalition Convention, 2024.

Ocampo was a business editor of the pre-martial law Manila Times and was the founder of the Business and Economic Reporters Association of the Philippines. He is a lifetime member of the National Press Club.

After President Ferdinand Marcos declared martial law on September 23, 1972, Ocampo, among others, went underground. In 1973, Ocampo co-founded of the National Democratic Front (NDF), seeking to unite various anti-dictatorship forces.

In 1976, he was arrested and incarcerated as a political prisoner. For the next nine years he was severely tortured in various prison camps. At one point, he shared a cell with detained Philippine Collegian editor-in-chief Abraham Sarmiento, Jr. Though tried by a military court for rebellion, he was never found guilty. In 1984, his daughter Sonora "Nona" Ocampo made him the subject of her short thesis film Ka Satur, a project made with classmates Maydee Aguirre and Carla de Vera at De La Salle University.

In 1985, while on pass to vote at the National Press Club annual elections, he escaped from the soldiers guarding him and rejoined the underground revolutionary movement. At the time of his escape, Ocampo was the longest-held political prisoner in the country.

After the Marcos dictatorship fell in 1986, President Corazon Aquino called for peace talks with the communists. Ocampo headed the peace negotiating panel of the NDF, which represents the Communist Party of the Philippines and the New People's Army. When the talks collapsed due to the killing of 18 farmers at a rally near the Malacañan Palace on January 22, 1987, Ocampo returned to the underground.

In 1989, he was rearrested together with his wife, Carolina Malay. Three years later in 1992, a year after his wife was released, he was freed. Neither was found guilty of any crime.

On November 28, 2018, Ocampo, Alliance of Concerned Teachers Rep. France Castro and over 70 others were arrested on allegations of kidnapping and human trafficking over the transport of Lumad minors from the town of Talaingod, Davao Del Norte. Ocampo's group was released after posting bail of PHP80,000 each.

In July 2024, Tagum City Regional Trial Court Branch 2 Judge Jimmy Boco sentenced Ocampo, Castro, and 11 others to 4 years to 6 years imprisonment, including P10,000 as civil indemnity and P10,000 as moral damages. The court ruled that the accused known as “Talaingod 18” violated Section 10(a) of Republic Act 7610, for endangerment of 14 Lumad students of the Salugpongan Ta Tanu Ingkanogan Community Learning Center in Talaingod, Davao del Norte. Ocampo appealed the decision before the regional trial court.

Human rights groups criticized the decision of the court. Human Rights Watch placed the conviction in the context of red-tagging and other "bogus" accusations against Lumad schools in Mindanao. ASEAN Parliamentarians for Human Rights described the verdict as an "absurd decision that has no basis in reality", while ACT-NCR Union said the verdict was dangerous precedent that "criminalizes acts of solidarity and support for marginalized communities".

On December 4, 2024, Ocampo and 74 others with the endorsement of Rep. Castro filed the second impeachment complaint against Vice President Sara Duterte, citing betrayal of public trust for her office's alleged misuse of confidential funds.

== Electoral history ==
Electoral history of Satur Ocampo
Year	Office	Party	Votes received				Result
Year	Office	Party	Total	%	P.	Swing	Result
2001	Representative (Party-list)	Bayan Muna (Note: Ran as a guest Nacionalista Party candidate in 2010.)	1,708,253	26.19%	1st	—N/a	Won
2004	Representative (Party-list)	Bayan Muna	1,203,305	9.46%	1st	-16.73	Won
2007	Representative (Party-list)	Bayan Muna	979,189	6.38%	2nd	-3.08	Won
2010	Senator of the Philippines	Bayan Muna	3,539,345	9.28%	26th	—N/a	Lost
