= National Anti-Poverty Commission =

Philippine government agency

- Pambansang Komisyon Laban sa Kahirapan
- NAPC Seal

Agency overview
- Formed: June 2, 1998
- Headquarters: Quezon City, Philippines
- Employees: 39 (2024)
- Annual budget: ₱232.22 million (2020)
- Agency executives: H.E. Pres. Bongbong Marcos, Chairman; Sec. Emmanuel D. Pacquiao, Lead Convenor
- Website: napc.gov.ph

The National Anti-Poverty Commission (NAPC) is a government agency of the Republic of the Philippines. It coordinates poverty reduction programs by national and local governments and ensures that marginalized sectors participate in government decision-making processes.

NAPC was created by virtue of Republic Act 8425, otherwise known as the "Social Reform and Poverty Alleviation Act," which took effect on June 2, 1998.

NAPC is one of the 12 agencies, formerly from the Office of the President which was placed under the supervision of the Cabinet Secretary, based on Executive Order No. 1 issued by President Rodrigo Duterte on July 4, 2016.

On October 31, 2018, through Executive Order No. 67, the Commission along with the Presidential Commission for the Urban Poor and the National Commission on Indigenous Peoples were transferred from the supervision of the Office of the Cabinet Secretary to the Department of Social Welfare and Development.

== Mandate ==
RA 8425 institutionalizes the government's Social Reform Agenda (SRA), which enjoins NAPC to strengthen and invigorate the partnerships between the national government and the basic sectors.

Through a systematic package of social interventions, the state hopes to ensure that social reform is a continuous process that addresses the basic inequities in Philippine society, and that a policy environment conducive to social reform is actively pursued.

NAPC's specific mandates are as follows:

- To act as the "coordinating and advisory body" that exercises oversight functions in implementing the SRA and ensure that it is incorporated into the formulation of national, regional, sub-regional and local development plans;
- To institutionalize basic sector and NGO participation in managing the SRA cycle;
- To develop microfinance by establishing the People's Development Trust Fund (PDTF) and strengthening the People's Credit and Finance Corporation as the forerunners for microfinance services; and
- To strengthen LGUs so they can incorporate the SRA in their local development efforts of the Philippines.

== Organizational structure ==
The President of the Philippines chairs NAPC and is assisted by the vice-chairperson for the Government Sector (with 25 national government agencies and presidents of the 4 leagues of local governments as members) and another vice-chairperson for the Basic Sectors (with representatives from the 14 basic sectors as members). NAPC is supported by a Secretariat, which is currently headed by Lead Convenor Emmanuel D. Pacquiao.

== Basic sectors ==
A central aspect of NAPC's mandate is to strengthen partnerships between the national government and these key stakeholders. This is crucial so effective anti-poverty strategies can be crafted. The sectors are the government’s partners in reform and development, and are critical in helping to bring about better living conditions for the poor.

RA 8425 divides the basic sectors into 14 main groupings:

- Farmers and landless rural workers
- Artisanal fisher folk
- Urban poor
- Indigenous people and cultural communities
- Workers in formal labor and migrant workers
- Workers in the informal sector
- Women
- Children
- Youth and students
- Senior citizens
- Persons with disabilities
- Victims of disasters and calamities
- Non-governmental organizations
- Cooperatives
