= Liza Maza =

Filipina politician and activist

The Honorable Liza Maza
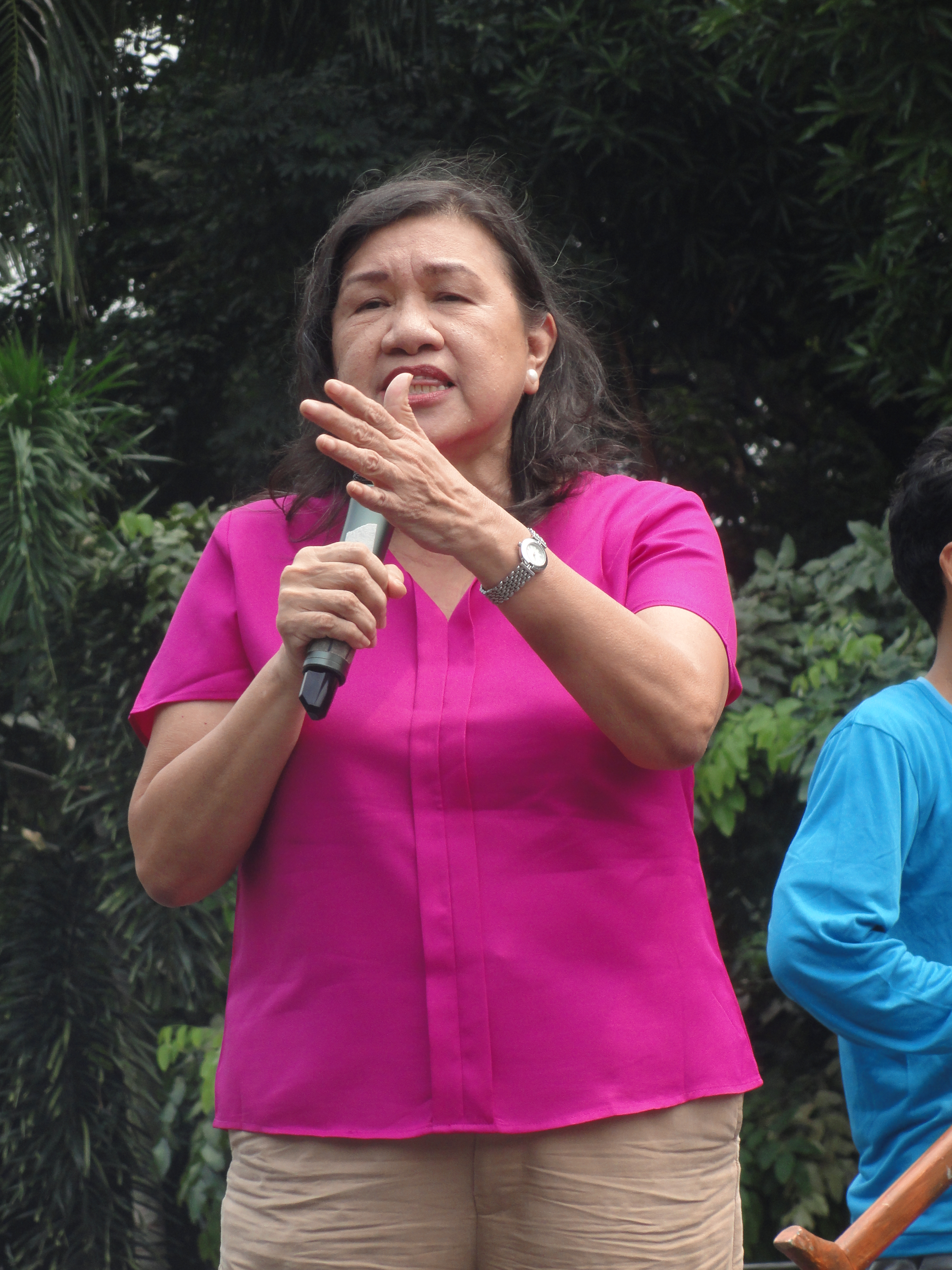
- Maza in August 2024

Lead Convenor of National Anti-Poverty Commission
- In office August 1, 2016 – August 20, 2018
- President: Rodrigo Duterte
- Preceded by: Jose Eliseo Rocamora
- Succeeded by: Noel Felongco

Member of the Philippine House of Representatives for Gabriela
- In office June 30, 2004 – June 30, 2010 Serving with Luzviminda Ilagan

Member of the Philippine House of Representatives for Bayan Muna
- In office June 30, 2001 – June 30, 2004 Serving with Crispin Beltran & Satur Ocampo

Personal details
- Born: Liza Lagorza; September 8, 1957 (age 69) San Pablo, Laguna, Philippines
- Party: Gabriela (2004–present)
- Other political affiliations: Bayan Muna (2001–2004); Makabayan (2009–present)
- Spouse: Jaime Maza (deceased)
- Education: University of the Philippines Diliman

Liza Lagorza Maza (born September 8, 1957) is a Filipina politician and activist who was the lead convenor of the National Anti-Poverty Commission under the Duterte administration from August 2016 until her resignation in August 2018. She was a member of the Philippine House of Representatives, representing the Gabriela Women's Party.

== Biography ==
Maza was born in San Pablo, Laguna.

Maza got her Bachelor of Science in Business Economics degree from the University of the Philippines Diliman in 1978.

Maza has authored 18 bills and 24 resolutions as a Bayan Muna representative to the 12th Congress. As a representative of Gabriela Women's Party, she has authored 53 bills and 120 resolutions at the 13th and 14th Congress. The bills she authored that were passed as laws include the Rent Control Act of 2009 (RA 9653), The Juvenile Justice and Welfare Act of 2006 (RA 9344), Magna Carta of Women (RA 9710), Philippine Nursing Act (RA 9173), Anti-Torture Law (RA 9745) and the Anti-Violence in Women and Children Act (RA 9262), which she co-authored. She also authored the Anti-Trafficking in Persons Act of 2003.

On July 8, 2015, U.S. immigration authorities barred her from entering the U.S. to participate in a left-wing conference on U.S. activities in the Philippines. She has accused the U.S. of supporting human rights violations in the Philippines. She plans to file charges against the U.S. and Korean Airlines, the airline that she was supposed to have taken.

In August 2024, she announced her intention to run for the Senate under the Makabayan bloc in the 2025 elections. On December 4, 2024, Maza and 74 others filed the second impeachment complaint against Vice President Sara Duterte, citing betrayal of public trust for her office's alleged misuse of confidential funds. By February 2025, it was consolidated with two other complaints into a single impeachment complaint and signed by 240 lawmakers out of 305, reaching the 1/3 votes threshold and impeaching Vice President Duterte. In May 2025, Maza placed 37th in the Senate elections, failing to win a seat.

On January 26, 2026, Maza and 35 others filed the second impeachment complaint against President Bongbong Marcos, citing his potential involvement in the "BBM Parametric Formula" used by the Department of Public Works and Highways, which they alleged to have allowed systemic corruption in government, as well as his alleged involvement in kickback schemes and unprogrammed appropriations.

== Electoral history ==
Year	Office	Party	Votes received				Result
Year	Office	Party	Total	%	P.	Swing	Result
2001	Representative (Party-list)	Bayan Muna	1,708,253	26.19%	1st	—N/a	Won
2004	Representative (Party-list)	Gabriela	464,586	3.65%	7th	—N/a	Won
2007	Representative (Party-list)	Gabriela	621,266	3.88%	4th	+0.23	Won
2010	Senator of the Philippines	Independent	3,855,800	10.11%	25th	—N/a	Lost
2025	Senator of the Philippines	Makabayan	3,927,784	6.85%	37th	—N/a	Lost
