= Bayan Muna =

Leftist political party in the Philippines

- — Philippine partylist —
- Chairperson: Neri Colmenares
- President: Satur Ocampo
- Founded: September 25, 1999; 27 years ago
- Ideology: Left-wing nationalism; National democracy; Anti-imperialism
- Political position: Left-wing
- National affiliation: Bayan; Makabayan
- Colors: Red, Yellow, Blue

Website
- www.bayanmuna.com.ph

Bayan Muna (lit. 'Nation First') is a national democratic party-list in the Philippines, a member of the leftist political coalition Makabayan. The motto of the party is "New Politics, the Politics of Change", against "traditional, elitist, pro-imperialist politics".

Its platform includes the advocation of a government that progressively supports the masses, with meaningful representation of all democratic sectors in the Philippines.

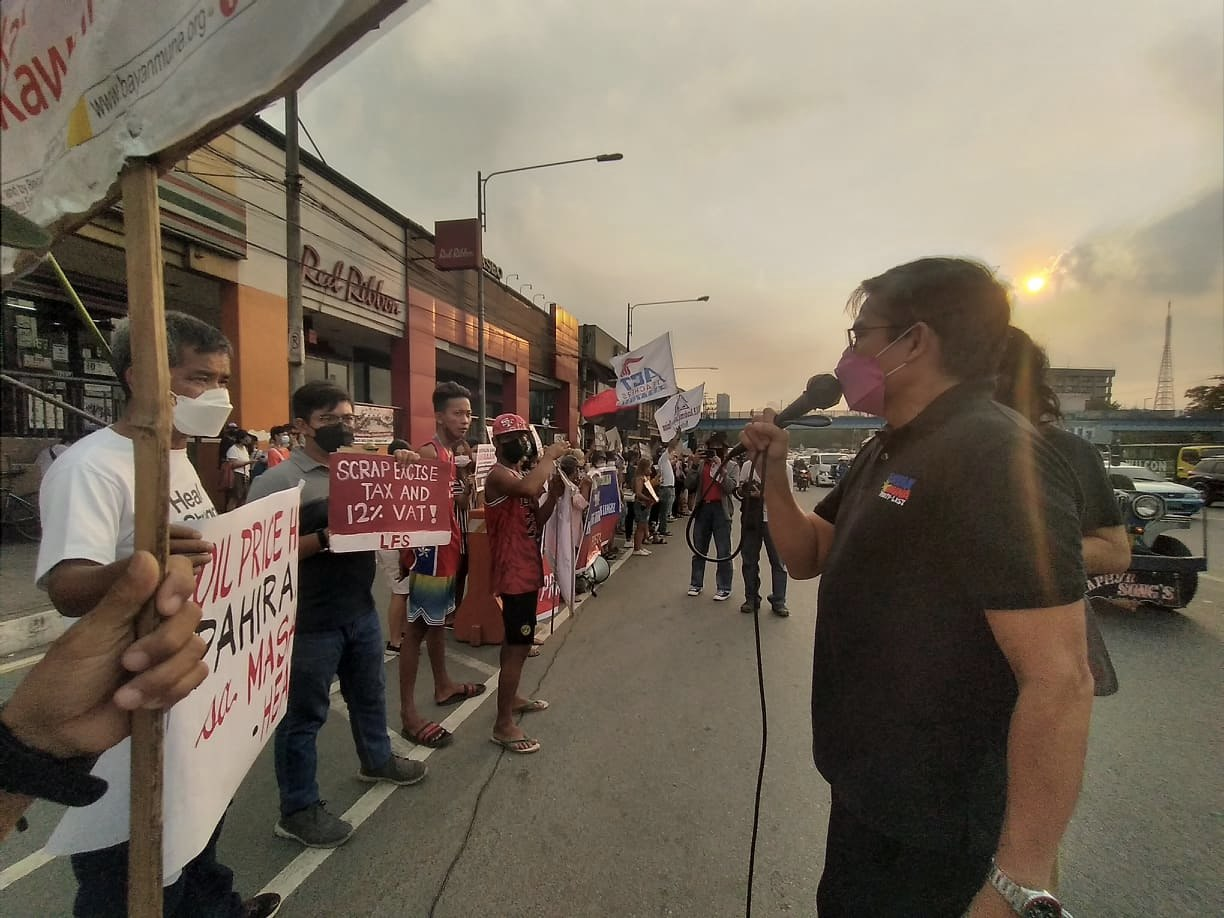
Bayan Muna Congressman Ferdinand Gaite speaking in a mobilization against oil price hike, March 18, 2022.

== History ==
With the group having contested in the elections from 2001, Bayan Muna was one of the most voted party-list party-lists up until the 2022 Philippine elections.

In the weeks leading up the 2007 elections, Executive Secretary Eduardo Ermita, on behalf of the Armed Forces of the Philippines, admitted "Malacañang’s leading role in the fabricated charges leveled against Rep. Ocampo and the campaign to crush Bayan Muna." Bayan Muna partylist representative Satur Ocampo was detained weeks prior in March 2007 on murder charges from an alleged 1984 communist purge in Leyte. The arrest was widely condemned by international observers. Rep. Ocampo was ordered released on bail by the Supreme Court.

In 2010, Bayan Muna Representative Satur Ocampo and former Bayan Muna and incumbent Gabriela Representative Liza Maza ran for senate seats as guest candidates under the ticket of billionaire real estate magnate Senator Manny Villar. Ocampo said that their common objective “is to emancipate the people from widespread poverty and social injustice." This move was controversial amongst some as the ticket also included Bongbong Marcos, the son of the late dictator Ferdinand Marcos whom the national democratic movement opposed.

In 2019, Bayan Muna was the second most voted party-list, which gained them 3 seats in the Philippine House of Representatives. This is amidst instances of red-tagging towards its representatives and supporters.

After failing to gain a single seat during the 2022 and 2025 elections, Bayan Muna was delisted as a party-list.

== Electoral performance ==
Election	Votes	%	Seats	Representatives to Congress
2001	1,708,253	11.30%	3	Crispin Beltran, Liza Maza, Satur Ocampo (12th Congress)
2004	1,203,305	9.46%	3	Teodoro Casiño, Satur Ocampo, Joel Virador (13th Congress)
2007	979,039	6.14%	3	Teodoro Casiño, Neri Colmenares, Satur Ocampo (14th Congress)
2010	746,019	2.47%	2	Teodoro Casiño, Neri Colmenares (15th Congress)
2013	946,308	3.48%	2	Neri Colmenares, Carlos Isagani Zarate (16th Congress)
2016	606,566	1.87%	1	Carlos Isagani Zarate (17th Congress)
2019	1,112,979	4.01%	3	Carlos Isagani Zarate, Ferdinand Gaite, Eufemia Cullamat (18th Congress)
2022	215,981	0.60%	0	N/A (19th Congress)
2025	162,894	0.39%	0	N/A (20th Congress)

== List of chairpersons, secretaries general and presidents ==
=== Chairperson ===
- Reynaldo Lesaca Jr. (2000–2010s)
- Neri Colmenares (2010s–present)

==== Vice chairperson ====
- Crispin Beltran
- Teodoro Casiño (2021–present)

=== Secretary general ===
- Nathanael S. Santiago (2000–present)

==== Deputy secretary general ====
- Robert de Castro
- Natalie V. Pulvinar (2021–present)

=== President ===
- Satur Ocampo (2000–present)
