= 2010 Philippine House of Representatives elections in the Autonomous Region in Muslim Mindanao =

Philippine House of Representatives elections in the Autonomous Region in Muslim Mindanao, 2010
- May 10, 2010

8 seats of the Autonomous Region in Muslim Mindanao in the House of Representatives
	First party	Second party	Third party
Party	Lakas–Kampi	Nacionalista	NPC
Seats won	6	0	1
Popular vote	541,189	126,853	122,924
Percentage	52.20%	12.24%	11.86%
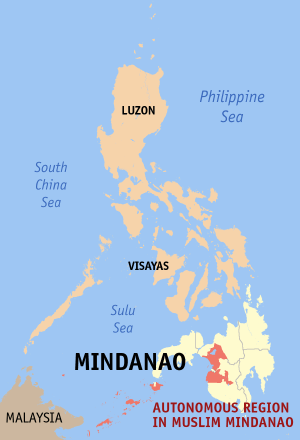
- Location of the Autonomous Region in Muslim Mindanao within the country.

Elections were held in the Autonomous Region in Muslim Mindanao (ARMM) for seats in the House of Representatives of the Philippines on May 10, 2010.

The candidate with the most votes won that district's seat for the 15th Congress of the Philippines.

Note that Isabela, Basilan, despite being a part of the province of Basilan, is not a part of the ARMM. The voters in Isabela vote their representative as part of Basilan's legislative district. On the other hand, Cotabato City, despite not being a part of the ARMM and of Maguindanao, elects their representative as a part of the Maguindanao's 1st district.

== Summary ==
Party	Popular vote	%	Seats won
Lakas–Kampi	541,189	52.20%	6
Nacionalista	126,853	12.24%	0
NPC	122,924	11.86%	1
PMP	20,426	1.97%	0
Bangon Pilipinas	5,506	0.53%	0
Bagumbayan	2,580	0.25%	0
Liberal	1,022	0.10%	0
PDP–Laban	479	0.05%	0
Independent	202,314	19.51%	1
Valid votes	1,036,736	88.74%	8
Invalid votes*	131,609	11.26%	
Turnout*	1,168,345	64.34%	
Registered voters	1,816,022	100.00%	

*Invalid votes and turnout for Lanao del Sur's districts are not available.

== Basilan ==
Incumbent Wahab Akbar (Liberal Party) was assassinated at the Batasang Pambansa bombing, the Liberal Party did not nominate anyone as their candidate in this district. Akbar's brother Rajam is Aksyon Demokratiko's candidate.

The result of the election is under protest in the House of Representatives Electoral Tribunal.

Candidate	Party	Votes	%
Hadjiman Hataman Salliman	Independent	48,459	33.71
Abdulgani Salapuddin	Nacionalista Party	36,196	25.18
Tahira Ismael	Pwersa ng Masang Pilipino	15,581	10.84
Rajam Akbar	Aksyon Demokratiko	13,443	9.35
Leonardo Pioquinto	Independent	12,124	8.43
Sakib Salajin	Lakas–Kampi–CMD	11,657	8.11
Ibno Turabin	Bagumbayan–VNP	2,580	1.79
Muctar Muarip	Independent	1,686	1.17
Hadja Salwa Julwadi	Independent	1,214	0.84
Usdatz Jhularab Sampang	Independent	478	0.33
Ondos Sahdin	Independent	323	0.22
Total		143,741	100.00
Valid votes		143,741	89.81
Invalid/blank votes		16,310	10.19
Total votes		160,051	100.00
Independent gain from Liberal Party			
Source: Commission on Elections

== Lanao del Sur ==
=== 1st District ===
Incumbent Faysah Dumarpa is in her third consecutive term already and is ineligible for reelection. Lakas-Kampi-CMD's nominee in this district is Mohammed Hussein Pangandaman, although Dumarpa's husband Salic will run as the candidate of the Nacionalista Party.

Candidate	Party	Votes	%
Mohammed Hussein Pangandaman	Lakas–Kampi–CMD	88,084	
Salic Dumarpa	Nacionalista Party	84,636	
Princess Johyra Pangarungan	Pwersa ng Masang Pilipino		
Salic Mundir	Aksyon Demokratiko		
Abul Khayr Alonto	Independent		
Total			
Lakas–Kampi–CMD gain from Nacionalista Party			

=== 2nd District ===
Pangalian Balindong is the incumbent.

The result of the election is under protest in the House of Representatives Electoral Tribunal.

Candidate	Party	Votes	%
Pangalian Balindong (incumbent)	Lakas–Kampi–CMD	67,621	60.44
Benasing Macarambon	Nacionalista Party		
Carding Alonto	PDP–Laban		
Hajiakbar Lucman	Pwersa ng Masang Pilipino		
Total			
Lakas–Kampi–CMD hold			

== Maguindanao ==
=== 1st District ===
Incumbent Didagen Dilangalen is running as independent.

The result of the election is under protest in the House of Representatives Electoral Tribunal.

Candidate	Party	Votes	%
Bai Sandra Sema	Lakas–Kampi–CMD	143,546	65.98
Didagen Dilangalen (incumbent)	Independent	74,005	34.02
Total		217,551	100.00
Valid votes		217,551	93.71
Invalid/blank votes		14,598	6.29
Total votes		232,149	100.00
Lakas–Kampi–CMD gain from Independent			
Source: Commission on Elections

=== 2nd District ===
Incumbent Simeon Datumanong is running unopposed.

Candidate	Party	Votes	%
Simeon Datumanong (incumbent)	Lakas–Kampi–CMD	123,111	100.00
Total		123,111	100.00
Valid votes		123,111	60.92
Invalid/blank votes		78,978	39.08
Total votes		202,089	100.00
Lakas–Kampi–CMD hold			
Source: Commission on Elections

== Sulu ==
=== 1st District ===
Yusop Jikiri is the incumbent.

The result of the election is under protest in the House of Representatives Electoral Tribunal.

Candidate	Party	Votes	%
Tupay Loong	Lakas–Kampi–CMD	63,569	55.40
Yusop Jikiri (incumbent)	Nationalist People's Coalition	47,395	41.30
Samsula Adju	Bangon Pilipinas	3,785	3.30
Total		114,749	100.00
Valid votes		114,749	90.45
Invalid/blank votes		12,115	9.55
Total votes		126,864	100.00
Lakas–Kampi–CMD gain from Nationalist People's Coalition			
Source: ibanangayon.ph

=== 2nd District ===
Incumbent Munir Arbison is in his third consecutive term already and is ineligible for reelection; he is running for governor of Sulu. Lakas-Kampi-CMD nominated Asani Tammang as their candidate in this district. Bangon Pilipinas Party nominated Ahmad Jinnul as their candidate in this district. Liberal Party (Philippines) nominated Abdullajid Estino as their candidate in this district.

Candidate	Party	Votes	%
Nur-Ana Sahidulla	Nationalist People's Coalition	56,627	60.48
Asani Tammang	Lakas–Kampi–CMD	34,263	36.59
Ahmad Jinnul	Bangon Pilipinas	1,721	1.84
Abdullajid Estino	Liberal Party	1,022	1.09
Total		93,633	100.00
Valid votes		93,633	91.73
Invalid/blank votes		8,444	8.27
Total votes		102,077	100.00
Nationalist People's Coalition gain from Lakas–Kampi–CMD			
Source: ibanangayon.ph

== Tawi-Tawi ==
Nur Jaafar is the incumbent, running against Sulay Halipa, Anuar Abubakar, Alawadin Bandon Jr, and Nasher Sugala.

Candidate	Party	Votes	%
Nur Jaafar (incumbent)	Lakas–Kampi–CMD	58,552	52.95
Sulay Halipa	Independent	30,041	27.17
Anuar Abubakar	Nationalist People's Coalition	18,902	17.09
Alawadin Bandon Jr.	Independent	2,480	2.24
Nasher Sugala	Independent	607	0.55
Total		110,582	100.00
Valid votes		110,582	92.01
Invalid/blank votes		9,608	7.99
Total votes		120,190	100.00
Lakas–Kampi–CMD hold			
Source: Commission on Elections
