= List of Philippine legislators who died in office =

The following is a list of members of the various national legislatures of the Philippines who died in office:

- Philippine Legislature (1907–1935)
  - Philippine Assembly (1907–1916)
  - House of Representatives (1916–1935)
  - Philippine Commission (1907–1916)
  - Senate (1916–1935)
- National Assembly (1935–1941)
- Commonwealth Congress (1941–1946)
  - House of Representatives (1941–1946)
  - Senate (1941–1946)
- National Assembly (1942–1943)
- Congress (1946–1972)
  - House of Representatives (1946–1972)
  - Senate (1946–1972)
- Batasang Pambansa (1978–86)
- Congress (1987–present)
  - House of Representatives (1987–present)
  - Senate (1987–present)

== Senate ==
=== Insular Senate (1916–1935) ===
Member	Portrait	Party	District	Date of death	Age at death (years)	Cause
Francisco Tongio Liongson		Nacionalista	3rd	February 20, 1919	49	Anthrax
Espiridion Guanco		Nacionalista	8th	May 2, 1925	50	Cerebral attack
Santiago Lucero		Democrata	3rd	November 2, 1925	54	
Tomás Gómez		Nacionalista	9th	July 28, 1926	48-49	
Jose Maria Arroyo		Nacionalista	7th	March 8, 1927	51-52	
Mariano Yulo		Nacionalista	8th	July 11, 1929	65	Car accident
Juan B. Alegre		Democrata	6th	June 14, 1931	49	Gastric ulcer
Potenciano Treñas		Nacionalista	7th	June 10, 1934	40	
José Clarín		Nacionalista	11th	June 2, 1935	55	Lung tumor

=== Senate (at-large; 1941–1972, 1987–present) ===
Member	Portrait	Party	Date of death	Age at death (years)	Cause
Norberto Romualdez		Nacionalista	November 4, 1941	66	Heart attack
Daniel Maramba		Nacionalista	December 28, 1941	71	Tuberculosis
José Ozámiz		Nacionalista	February 11, 1944	45	Executed by the Japanese during World War II
Vicente Y. Sotto		Popular Front	March 28, 1950	73	
Tomás Confesor		Nacionalista	June 6, 1951	60	Heart attack
Emiliano Tria Tirona		Liberal	April 8, 1952	70	Lung cancer
Esteban Abada		Liberal	December 17, 1954	58	
Ruperto Kangleon		Democratic	February 27, 1958	58	Heart attack
Claro M. Recto		Nacionalista	October 2, 1960	70	Heart attack
Mariano Jesús Cuenco		Nacionalista	February 25, 1964	76	
Eulogio Rodriguez		Nacionalista	December 9, 1964	81	Heart attack
Gaudencio Antonino		Liberal	November 13, 1967	58	Helicopter crash
Marcelo Fernan		LDP	July 11, 1999	71	Cancer
Renato Cayetano		Lakas	June 25, 2003	68	Abdominal cancer

== Lower house ==
=== Philippine Assembly (1907–1916) ===
Member	Portrait	Party	Province (district)	Date of death	Age at death (years)	Cause
Melecio Cojuangco		Progresista	Tarlac (1st district)	March 13, 1909		Heart attack
Dimas Guzman		Nacionalista	Isabela (Lone district)	March 18, 1909		
Manuel Gavieres		Nacionalista	Surigao (Lone district)	May 31, 1910		
Teofilo Castillejos		Nacionalista	Batanes (Lone district)	July 22, 1910		
Aguedo Velarde		Nacionalista	Bulacan (1st district)	December 22, 1913		
Emilio Acevedo		Nacionalista	Capiz (2nd district)	July 27, 1914		
Melecio Severino		Nacionalista	Negros Occidental (1st district)	May 16, 1915	48	

=== House of Representatives (1916–1935) ===
Member	Portrait	Party	Province (district)	Date of death	Age at death (years)	Cause
Augusto Reyes		Nacionalista	Cavite (Lone district)	July 3, 1925		
Antero Soriano		Nacionalista	Cavite (Lone district)	June 15, 1929	41	Appendicitis
Froilan Pavericio		Democrata	Albay (1st district)	August 9, 1931		
Mariano Leuterio		Nacionalista	Mindoro (Lone district)	April 23, 1932		

=== National Assembly (1935–1941) ===
Member	Portrait	Party	Province (district)	Date of death	Age at death (years)	Cause
Julio Nalundasan		Nacionalista	Ilocos Norte (2nd district)	September 20, 1935	41	Assassinated
Ruperto Kapunan		Nacionalista	Leyte (5th district)	February 4, 1939		
Ruperto Montinola		Nacionalista	Iloilo (2nd district)	February 10, 1940	70	
Norberto Romualdez		Nacionalista	Leyte (4th district)	November 4, 1941	66	Heart attack
Atanasio Ampig		Nacionalista	Iloilo (3rd district)	December 17, 1941		Died in the sinking of the SS Corregidor during World War II
Juan M. Reyes		Nacionalista	Capiz (3rd district)	December 17, 1941		Died in the sinking of the SS Corregidor during World War II

=== House of Representatives (1941–1972) ===
Member	Portrait	Party	Province (district)	Date of death	Age at death (years)	Cause
Vicente Agan		Nacionalista	Batanes (Lone district)			
Leon Valencia		Nacionalista	Bulacan (1st district)			
Eusebio Orense		Nacionalista	Batangas (2nd district)	February 23, 1942		
Wenceslao Vinzons		Young Philippines	Camarines Norte (Lone district)	July 15, 1942	31	Executed by the Japanese during World War II
Manuel Fortich		Nacionalista	Bukidnon (Lone district)	January 15, 1943		
Antonio Llamas		Nacionalista	Bataan (Lone district)	March 1945		Killed by the Japanese during World War II
Crisanto Guysayko		Nacionalista	Laguna (2nd district)	May 26, 1945	55-56	
Carlos Fortich Sr.		Liberal	Bukidnon (Lone district)	October 12, 1946		
Gaudencio Dimaisip		Nacionalista	Iloilo (4th district)	November 11, 1947		
Nicolas Rafols		Nacionalista	Cebu (6th district)	May 2, 1947	53	
Emilio dela Paz Sr.		Nacionalista	Rizal (2nd district)	August 30, 1951		
Lorenzo Ziga		Liberal	Albay (1st district)	November 4, 1954		Car crash
Gregorio Bienvenido Tan		Nacionalista	Samar (1st district)	November 4, 1954		Car crash
Pedro Lopez		Nacionalista	Cebu (2nd district)	March 17, 1957	51	Plane crash
Eugenio Perez		Liberal	Pangasinan (2nd district)	August 4, 1957	60	
Pio Duran		Nacionalista	Albay (3rd district)	February 8, 1961		
Vicente Gustilo		Nacionalista	Negros Occidental (1st district)	December 17, 1962		
Apolinario Apacible		Nacionalista	Batangas (1st district)	August 22, 1963		
Tobias Fornier		Nacionalista	Antique (Lone district)	October 31, 1964	62	
Ramon Tabiana		Liberal	Iloilo (3rd district)	December 20, 1964		
Eladio Balite		Liberal	Northern Samar (Lone district)	August 24, 1967		
Isidro Kintanar		Nacionalista	Cebu (4th district)	April 8, 1968	52	Heart attack
Vicente Peralta		Nacionalista	Sorsogon (2nd district)	June 13, 1968		
Salud Vivero Parreño		Nacionalista	Leyte (2nd district)	December 27, 1969		
Floro Crisologo		Nacionalista	Ilocos Sur (1st district)	October 18, 1970	62	Assassinated

=== Batasang Pambansa (1978–1986) ===
Member	Portrait	Party	Province/City (district)	Date of death	Age at death (years)	Cause
Venancio Yaneza		Independent	Masbate (at-large)	September 9, 1984	46	Stroke
Cesar Climaco		UNIDO	Zamboanga City (at-large)	November 14, 1984	68	Assassinated
Salipada Pendatun		KBL	Maguindanao (at-large)	January 27, 1985	72	Car accident

=== House of Representatives (1987–present) ===
Member	Portrait	Party	Province/City (district)	Date of death	Age at death (years)	Cause
Moises Tapia		Independent	Catanduanes (Lone district)	November 15, 1987	51	Plane crash
Elfren Sarte		Liberal	Albay (3rd district)	July 22, 1988	64	
Moises Espinosa		LDP	Masbate (3rd district)	March 17, 1989	55	Assassinated
Estelita Juco		Independent	Sectoral (Women and the Disabled)	July 12, 1989	59	
Rogaciano Mercado		LABAN	Bulacan (4th district)	November 13, 1989	73	Heart attack
Omar Dianalan		Liberal	Lanao del Sur (1st district)	April 30, 1990		
Mario Tagarao		Liberal	Quezon (2nd district)	April 23, 1990	n/a	
Gerardo Roxas Jr.		Liberal	Capiz (1st district)	April 4, 1993	32	Colon cancer
Joseph Sibug		Independent	Sectoral (Cultural Minority)	February 14, 1994		
Tito Espinosa		Lakas	Masbate (1st district)	February 28, 1995	52	Assassinated
Catalino Nava		Lakas	Guimaras (Lone district)	December 3, 1995	n/a	
Teodulo Natividad		LDP	Bulacan (1st district)	January 9, 1997	72	Prostate cancer
Magdaleno Palacol Sr.		Lakas	Laguna (4th district)	1997	78-79	
Elias Lopez		Lakas	Davao City (3rd district)	September 1997	67	
Andres Dinglasan Jr.		Independent	Sectoral (Labor)	1997		
Emigdio Bondoc		Lakas	Pampanga (4th district)	November 25, 1997	69	Car accident
Percival Catane		Lakas	Misamis Occidental (1st district)	July 15, 1998		
Norma Imperial		LAMMP	Albay (2nd district)	September 29, 2000		
Hilarion Ramiro Jr.		Independent	Misamis Occidental (2nd district)	January 5, 2001	62	Heart attack
Marcial Punzalan Jr.		LAMMP	Quezon (2nd district)	May 12, 2001	54	Assassinated
Rodolfo Aguinaldo		LAMMP	Cagayan (3rd district)	June 12, 2001	54	Assassinated
Napoleon Beratio		LDP	Cavite (3rd district)	August 7, 2002	66	Pancreatic cancer
Reynaldo Calalay		LDP	Quezon City (1st district)	January 11, 2003		
Antonio Abaya		Lakas	Isabela (4th district)	February 26, 2003	68	Brain cancer
Benjamin Cruz		Butil Farmers Party	Party-list (BUTIL)	October 15, 2004		
Romualdo Vicencio		Lakas	Northern Samar (2nd district)	July 26, 2006	72	
Luis Bersamin Jr.		KAMPI	Abra (Lone district)	December 16, 2006	62	Assassinated
Ernesto Gidaya		Veterans Freedom Party	Party-list (VFP)	January 29, 2007		
Antonio Serapio		NPC	Valenzuela City (2nd district)	February 19, 2007	69	Car accident caused by a heart attack
Wahab Akbar		Lakas	Basilan (Lone district)	November 13, 2007	47	Assassinated in the Batasang Pambansa bombing
Victor Dominguez		KAMPI	Mountain Province (Lone district)	February 9, 2008	72	Heart attack
Crispin Beltran		Anakpawis	Party-list (Anakpawis)	May 20, 2008	75	Injuries from a fall
Danilo Lagbas		Lakas	Misamis Oriental (1st district)	June 8, 2008	56	Heart attack
Leonila Chavez		Butil Farmers Party	Party-list (BUTIL)	January 28, 2010	75	Stroke
Jose Yap		Lakas	Tarlac (2nd district)	March 2, 2010	81	Prostate cancer
Florencio Vargas		Lakas	Cagayan (2nd district)	July 22, 2010	79	Heart attack
Antonio Diaz		WPP	Zambales (2nd district)	August 3, 2011	83	Pneumonia
Ignacio Arroyo, Jr.		Lakas	Negros Occidental (5th district)	January 26, 2012	60	Liver cirrhosis
Salvador Escudero III		Liberal	Sorsogon (1st district)	August 13, 2012	69	Colon cancer
Erico Aumentado		NPC	Bohol (1st district)	December 25, 2012	72	Pneumonia
Pedro Romualdo		NPC	Camiguin (Lone district)	April 24, 2013	77	Pneumonia
Enrique Cojuangco		NPC	Tarlac (1st district)	May 12, 2015	74	Aneurysm
Elmer Panotes		Lakas	Camarines Norte (2nd district)	September 16, 2015	75	Pneumonia caused by prostate cancer
Roy Señeres		OFW Family Club	Party-list (OFW Famly Club)	February 8, 2016	68	Heart attack
Enrique Garcia Jr.		NUP	Bataan (2nd district)	June 13, 2016	75	Pneumonia caused by a liver ailment
Habib Tupay Loong		NUP	Sulu (1st district)	July 1, 2016	69	Liver cirrhosis
Jum Jainudin Akbar		Liberal	Basilan (Lone district)	November 11, 2016	53	Heart attack
Maximo Dalog		Liberal	Mountain Province (Lone district)	June 3, 2017	70	Kidney failure
Henedina Abad		Liberal	Batanes (Lone district)	October 8, 2017	62	Cancer
Ciriaco Calalang		Kabalikat ng Mamamayan	Party-list (KABAYAN)	September 23, 2018	67	Stroke
Rodel Batocabe		Ako Bicol	Party-list (Ako Bicol)	December 22, 2018	52	Assassinated
Rodolfo Albano Jr.		LPG Marketers Association	Party-list (LPGMA)	November 5, 2019	85	Heart failure
Nestor Fongwan		PDP–Laban	Benguet (Lone district)	December 19, 2019	68	
Marissa Mercado-Andaya		NPC	Camarines Sur (2nd district)	July 5, 2020	51	Cancer
Francisco Datol		Senior Citizens Partylist	Party-list (Senior Citizens)	August 10, 2020	71	COVID-19
Bernardita Ramos		NPC	Sorsogon (2nd district)	September 8, 2020	76	COVID-19
Raul del Mar		Liberal	Cebu City (1st district)	November 16, 2020	79	
Resurreccion Acop		NUP	Antipolo (2nd district)	May 28, 2021	73	COVID-19
Carlos Cojuangco		NPC	Tarlac (1st district)	February 22, 2022	58	
Marisol Panotes		PDP–Laban	Camarines Norte (2nd district)	April 29, 2022	76	
Edward Hagedorn		PDP–Laban	Palawan (3rd district)	October 3, 2023	76	Pancreatic cancer
Edgardo Salvame		PRP	Palawan (1st district)	March 13, 2024	61	
Elpidio Barzaga Jr.		NUP	Cavite (4th district)	April 27, 2024	74	
Edcel Lagman		Liberal	Albay (1st district)	January 30, 2025	82	Cardiac arrest
Reynaldo Tamayo Sr.		ANGAT	Party-list (ANGAT)	June 21, 2025	72	
Romeo Acop		NUP	Antipolo (2nd district)	December 20, 2025	78	Heart attack
Ciriaco Gato Jr.		NPC	Batanes (Lone district)	September 21, 2026	66	Cardiac arrest
