= 14th Congress of the Philippines =

35th legislative term of the Philippines

←	13th	15th	→
- GSIS Building (2010) (top) and Batasang Pambansa Complex (2010) (bottom)

Overview
- Term: July 23, 2007 – June 9, 2010
- President: Gloria Macapagal Arroyo
- Vice President: Noli de Castro

Senate
- Members: 24
- President: Manny Villar (until November 17, 2008); Juan Ponce Enrile (from November 17, 2008)
- President pro tempore: Jinggoy Estrada
- Majority leader: Juan Miguel Zubiri
- Minority leader: Aquilino Pimentel Jr.

House of Representatives
- Members: 270
- Speaker: Jose de Venecia Jr. (until February 5, 2008); Prospero Nograles (from February 5, 2008)
- Deputy Speakers: Arnulfo Fuentebella; Eric Singson; Raul del Mar; Simeon Datumanong; Girlie Villarosa (from August 13, 2007); Pablo P. Garcia (from April 29, 2008)
- Majority leader: Arthur Defensor Sr.
- Minority leader: Ronaldo Zamora

The 14th Congress of the Philippines (Filipino: Ikalabing-apat na Kongreso ng Pilipinas), composed of the Philippine Senate and House of Representatives, met from July 23, 2007, until June 9, 2010, during the last three years of Gloria Macapagal Arroyo's presidency. The convening of the 14th Congress followed the 2007 general elections, which replaced half of the Senate membership and the entire membership of the House of Representatives. It celebrated the centennial year of the Philippine legislature.

== Events ==
=== Batasang Pambansa bombing ===
On the evening of November 13, 2007, an explosion at the South Wing of the Batasang Pambansa Complex killed six people, including Rep. Wahab Akbar (Lakas-CMD, Basilan). The other fatalities included an aide of Akbar, a driver of Gabriela Rep. Luzviminda Ilagan, and three aides of Rep. Pryde Henry Teves (Lakas-CMD, Negros Oriental–3rd). Ten others were injured in the blast, including Reps. Ilagan and Teves.

=== Arroyo impeachment ===
On October 5, 2007, Lawyer Robert Pulido filed a three-page impeachment complaint against President Gloria Macapagal Arroyo. This complaint was considered as a ploy by Malacañang according to the opposition. It was only supported by Rep. Edgar S. San Luis (independent, 4th District Laguna). On November 4, the House Committee on Justice, dominated by pro-Arroyo lawmakers, declared as "sufficient in form" the three-page impeachment complaint against President Arroyo. On November 6, the committee then deliberated whether the complaint (due to the National Broadband Network controversy) is "sufficient in substance." If the complaint was declared "sufficient in form", it would be considered as an impeachment proceeding; only one impeachment proceeding is allowed by the constitution, if the committee declares the complaint "insufficient in substance", it would give Arroyo an immunity from impeachment for a year. The committee ultimately voted to trash the complaint, with minority members boycotting the hearing.

=== Bribery scandal investigation ===
On November 13, 2007, there was also the Senate's hearing on the bribery scandal that occurred in the presidential palace.

=== The Manila Peninsula Rebellion ===
The Manila Peninsula rebellion occurred in the Philippines on November 29, 2007. Detained Senator Antonio Trillanes IV, General Lim and other Magdalo (mutineers) officials walked out of their trial and marched through the streets of Makati, calling for the ouster of President Gloria Macapagal Arroyo, and seizing the second floor of The Peninsula Manila Hotel along Ayala Avenue. Former Vice-president Teofisto Guingona also joined the march to the hotel.

Sen. Antonio Trillanes IV and Brigadier Gen. Danilo Lim surrendered to authorities after an armored personnel carrier rammed into the lobby of the hotel. Director Geary Barias declared that the standoff at the Manila Peninsula Hotel is over as Sen. Antonio Trillanes IV, Brig. Gen. Danilo Lim along with other junior officers agreed to leave the hotel and surrender to Barias after the 6 hour siege. There was difficulty getting out for a while due to the tear gas that was covering the area where they were hiding.

Days after the mutiny, the Makati Regional Trial Court dismissed the rebellion charges against all 14 civilians involved in the siege, and ordered their release.

=== National Broadband Network Scandal ===
The Philippine National Broadband Network controversy is a political affair that centers upon allegations of corruption primarily involving Former Commission on Elections (COMELEC) Chairman Benjamin Abalos, First Gentleman Mike Arroyo and President Gloria Macapagal Arroyo regarding the proposed government-managed National Broadband Network (NBN) for the Philippines and the awarding of its construction to the Chinese firm Zhong Xing Telecommunication Equipment Company Limited (ZTE), a telecommunications and networking equipment provider.

The issue has captivated Filipino politics since it erupted in Philippine media around August 2007, largely through the articles of newspaper columnist Jarius Bondoc of the Philippine Star. It has also taken an interesting turn of events, including the resignation of Abalos as COMELEC chairman, the alleged bribery of congressmen and provincial governors (dubbed as "Bribery in the Palace"), the unseating of Jose de Venecia, Jr. as House Speaker, and the alleged "kidnapping" of designated National Economic and Development Authority (NEDA) consultant-turned-NBN/ZTE witness Rodolfo Noel "Jun" Lozada, Jr.

=== The Spratly Islands Joint Exploration Agreement ===
In connection to the Philippine National Broadband Network controversy, The Joint Marine Seismic Undertaking (JMSU) is a tripartite agreement between the Philippines, China and Vietnam to conduct seismic exploration in an area spanning 142,886 square kilometers west of Palawan. More specifically, it is an agreement between Philippine National Oil Company -Exploration Corporation (PNOC-EC), China National Offshore Oil Corporation (CNOOC) and Vietnam Oil and Gas Corporation (PetroVietnam), that was signed in September 2004 and took effect in July 2005. JMSU has already finished the first phase of the seismic exploration which lasted from September 1 to November 16, 2006, covering 11,000 line kilometers. A Chinese vessel conducted the survey, Vietnam processed the data gathered and this was interpreted by PNOC-EC in Manila. The second phase started in October 2007, covering 11,800 line kilometers. It was supposed to end January 2008.

=== Charter change ===
Early in 2008, a proposal towards federalism was raised from both members of the Senate and the House of Representatives led by Senator Aquilino Pimentel, Jr. This however was later not pushed through due to President Gloria Macapagal Arroyo personally backing the proposal. Later on, allies of President Arroyo successfully passed House Resolution 1109 on June 2, 2009, by viva voce in a move to shift the government from the current presidential to parliamentary. All amendments would have needed the approval of three-fourths approval of Congress. The resolution was later shelved by the Senate as it has objected it being passed and due to public outcry towards it.

== Sessions ==
- First Regular Session: July 23, 2007 – June 13, 2008
- Second Regular Session: July 28, 2008 – June 5, 2009
- Third Regular Session: July 27, 2009 – June 9, 2010
  - First Joint Session: December 9–14, 2009
  - Second Joint Session: May 24 – June 9, 2010

== Leadership ==
=== Senate ===
Senate President

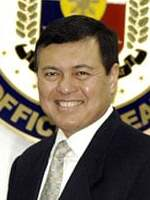
Manny Villar,
until November 17, 2008

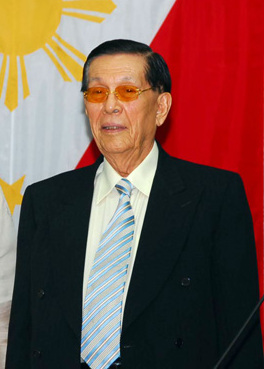
Juan Ponce Enrile,
from November 17, 2008

- President:
  - Manny Villar (Nacionalista), until November 17, 2008
  - Juan Ponce Enrile (PMP), from November 17, 2008
- President pro tempore: Jinggoy Estrada (PMP)
- Majority Floor Leader: Juan Miguel Zubiri (Lakas)
- Minority Floor Leader: Nene Pimentel (PDP–Laban)

=== House of Representatives ===
House Speaker

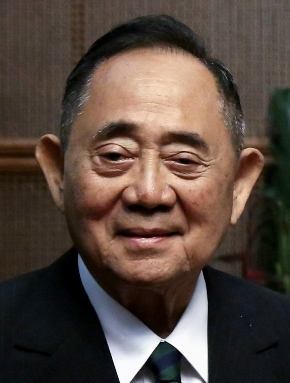
Jose de Venecia Jr.,
until February 5, 2008

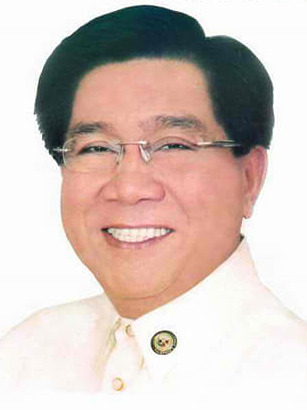
Prospero Nograles,
from February 5, 2008

- Speaker:
  - Jose de Venecia Jr. (Pangasinan–4th, Lakas), until February 5, 2008
  - Prospero Nograles (Davao City–1st, Lakas), from February 5, 2008
- Deputy Speakers:
  - Luzon:
    - Arnulfo Fuentebella (Camarines Sur–3rd, NPC)
    - Eric Singson (Ilocos Sur–2nd, Liberal)
  - Visayas:
    - Raul del Mar (Cebu City–1st, Liberal)
    - Pablo P. Garcia (Cebu–2nd, Lakas), from April 29, 2008
  - Mindanao:
    - Simeon Datumanong (Maguindanao–2nd, Lakas)
  - Women:
    - Girlie Villarosa (Occidental Mindoro–Lone, Lakas), from August 13, 2007
- Majority Floor Leader: Arthur Defensor Sr. (Iloilo–3rd, Lakas)
- Minority Floor Leader: Ronaldo Zamora (San Juan–Lone, NPC)

== Members ==
=== Composition ===
Final Senate composition.

Final House of Representatives composition.

Party	Senate	House of Representatives
Bagumbayan	1	0
LDP	1	1
Lakas–Kampi	4	119
LM	0	0
Lingkod Taguig	0	1
Liberal	4	31
Nacionalista	3	25
NPC	1	30
PDP–Laban	1	2
PRP	1	0
PMP	2	3
Independent	5	3
Party-lists	0	53
Vacancies	1	4
Total	24	272

=== Senate ===
The following are the terms of the senators of this Congress, according to the date of election:

- For senators elected on May 10, 2004: June 30, 2004 – June 30, 2010
- For senators elected on May 14, 2007: June 30, 2007 – June 30, 2013

Senator	Party	Term	Term end	Bloc (Note: Based upon election for the Senate President on November 17, 2008. Those who voted for Enrile are in the majority bloc, while those who voter otherwise, abstained or did not vote are in the minority bloc.)
Edgardo Angara	LDP	2	2013	Majority
Benigno Aquino III (Note: Benigno Aquino III resigned on June 30, 2010, upon taking office as President of the Philippines.)	Liberal	1	2013	Minority
Joker Arroyo	Lakas–Kampi (Note: Joker Arroyo was affiliated with the Kabalikat ng Malayang Pilipino until 2008.)	2	2013	Minority
Rodolfo Biazon	Liberal	2	2010	Majority
Alan Peter Cayetano	Nacionalista	1	2013	Minority
Pia Cayetano	Nacionalista	1	2010	Minority
Miriam Defensor Santiago	PRP	1	2010	Majority
Francis Escudero	Independent (Note: Francis Escudero was affiliated with the Nationalist People's Coalition until 2009.)	1	2013	Majority
Jinggoy Estrada	PMP	1	2010	Majority
Dick Gordon	Bagumbayan–VNP (Note: Dick Gordon was affiliated with Lakas–Kampi–CMD until 2009.)	1	2010	Majority
Gregorio Honasan	Independent	1	2013	Majority
Panfilo Lacson	Independent	2	2013	Majority
Lito Lapid	Lakas–Kampi	1	2010	Majority
Loren Legarda	NPC	1	2013	Majority
Jamby Madrigal	Independent (Note: Jamby Madrigal was affiliated with PDP–Laban until 2009.)	1	2010	Majority
Kiko Pangilinan	Liberal	2	2013	Minority
Nene Pimentel	PDP–Laban	2	2010	Minority
Juan Ponce Enrile	PMP	1	2010	Majority
Bong Revilla	Lakas–Kampi	1	2010	Majority
Mar Roxas	Liberal	1	2010	Majority
Antonio Trillanes (Note: Antonio Trillanes was in detention for his involvement in the Oakwood mutiny and the Manila Peninsula siege.)	Independent (Note: Antonio Trillanes was affiliated with the United Opposition until 2010.)	1	2013	Minority
Manny Villar	Nacionalista	2	2013	Minority
Juan Miguel Zubiri	Lakas–Kampi	1	2013	Majority

=== House of Representatives ===
Fourteenth Congress representation map of the Philippines

Province/City	District	Representative	Party	Term
Abra	Lone	Cecilia Seares-Luna	Lakas–Kampi (Note: Affiliated with the Liberal Party at election.)	1
Agusan del Norte	1st	Jose Aquino II	Lakas–Kampi	1
Agusan del Norte	2nd	Edelmiro Amante	Lakas–Kampi (Note: Affiliated with Kabalikat ng Malayang Pilipino at election.)	1
Agusan del Sur	Lone	Rodolfo Plaza	NPC	3
Aklan	Lone	Florencio Miraflores	Lakas–Kampi	2
Albay	1st	Edcel Lagman	Lakas–Kampi	2
Albay	2nd	Al Francis Bichara	Nacionalista	1
Albay	3rd	Reno Lim	NPC	1
Antipolo	1st	Roberto Puno	Lakas–Kampi	1
Antipolo	2nd	Angelito Gatlabayan	Lakas–Kampi	1
Antique	Lone	Exequiel Javier	Lakas–Kampi	3
Apayao	Lone	Elias Bulut Jr.	Lakas–Kampi (Note: Affiliated with the Nationalist People's Coalition at election.)	3
Aurora	Lone	Sonny Angara	LDP	2
Bacolod	Lone	Monico Puentevella	Lakas–Kampi	3
Baguio	Lone	Mauricio Domogan	Lakas–Kampi	3
Basilan	Lone	Wahab Akbar (Note: Wahab Akbar was assassinated on November 13, 2007.)	Liberal	1
Bataan	1st	Herminia Roman	Lakas–Kampi	1
Bataan	2nd	Albert Garcia	Lakas–Kampi	2
Batanes	Lone	Carlo Oliver Diasnes	Lakas–Kampi	1
Batangas	1st	Eileen Ermita-Buhain	Lakas–Kampi	3
Batangas	2nd	Hermilando Mandanas	Liberal	2
Batangas	3rd	Victoria Hernandez-Reyes	Lakas–Kampi	3
Batangas	4th	Mark Llandro Mendoza	NPC	1
Benguet	Lone	Samuel Dangwa	Lakas–Kampi	3
Biliran	Lone	Glenn Chong	Lakas–Kampi	1
Bohol	1st	Edgar Chatto	Lakas–Kampi	3
Bohol	2nd	Roberto Cajes	Lakas–Kampi	3
Bohol	3rd	Adam Jala	Lakas–Kampi	1
Bukidnon	1st	Candido Pancrudo Jr.	Lakas–Kampi	1
Bukidnon	2nd	TG Guingona	Liberal (Note: Affiliated with the Nacionalista Party at election.)	2
Bukidnon	3rd	Jose Zubiri III	Lakas–Kampi	1
Bulacan	1st	Victoria Sy-Alvarado	Lakas–Kampi	1
Bulacan	2nd	Pedro Pancho	Lakas–Kampi	2
Bulacan	3rd	Lorna Silverio	Lakas–Kampi	3
Bulacan	4th	Reylina Nicolas	Lakas–Kampi	3
Cagayan	1st	Sally Ponce Enrile	NPC	1
Cagayan	2nd	Florencio Vargas	Lakas–Kampi	2
Cagayan	3rd	Manuel Mamba	Liberal	3
Cagayan de Oro	1st	Rolando Uy	Lakas–Kampi (Note: Independent at election.)	1
Cagayan de Oro	2nd	Rufus Rodriguez	PMP	1
Caloocan	1st	Oscar Malapitan	Nacionalista	2
Caloocan	2nd	Mitzi Cajayon	Lakas–Kampi	1
Camarines Norte	Lone	Liwayway Vinzons-Chato	Liberal	1
Camarines Sur	1st	Dato Arroyo	Lakas–Kampi	1
Camarines Sur	2nd	Luis Villafuerte	NPC	2
Camarines Sur	3rd	Arnulfo Fuentebella	NPC	2
Camarines Sur	4th	Felix Alfelor Jr.	Lakas–Kampi	3
Camiguin	Lone	Pedro Romualdo	Lakas–Kampi	1
Capiz	1st	Antonio del Rosario	Liberal	1
Capiz	2nd	Fredenil Castro	Lakas–Kampi	3
Catanduanes	Lone	Joseph Santiago	NPC	3
Cavite	1st	Jun Abaya	Liberal	2
Cavite	2nd	Elpidio Barzaga Jr.	Lakas–Kampi	1
Cavite	3rd	Jesus Crispin Remulla	Nacionalista (Note: Affiliated with Lakas–CMD at election.)	2
Cebu	1st	Eduardo Gullas	Nacionalista	2
Cebu	2nd	Pablo P. Garcia	Lakas–Kampi	1
Cebu	3rd	Pablo John Garcia	Lakas–Kampi	1
Cebu	4th	Benhur Salimbangon (Note: Benhur Salimbangon was removed by the Supreme Court on January 11, 2010, after an electoral protest.)	Lakas–Kampi	1
Cebu	4th	Celestino Martinez III (Note: Celestino Martinez III took office on May 24, 2010, after winning an electoral protest against Benhur Salimbangon.)	Liberal	0
Cebu	5th	Ramon Durano VI	NPC	1
Cebu	6th	Nerissa Soon-Ruiz	Nacionalista	3
Cebu City	1st	Raul del Mar	Liberal	3
Cebu City	2nd	Antonio Cuenco (Note: Antonio Cuenco was appointed as secretary-general of the ASEAN Inter-Parliamentary Assembly on February 4, 2010.)	Lakas–Kampi	3
Compostela Valley	1st	Manuel E. Zamora	Lakas–Kampi	3
Compostela Valley	2nd	Rommel Amatong	Lakas–Kampi	1
Cotabato	1st	Emmylou Taliño-Mendoza	Lakas–Kampi	3
Cotabato	2nd	Bernardo Piñol Jr.	Liberal	1
Davao City	1st	Prospero Nograles	Lakas–Kampi	3
Davao City	2nd	Vincent Garcia	Lakas–Kampi	3
Davao City	3rd	Isidro Ungab	Liberal (Note: Affiliated with PDP–Laban at election.)	1
Davao del Norte	1st	Arrel Olaño	Lakas–Kampi	3
Davao del Norte	2nd	Antonio Lagdameo Jr.	Lakas–Kampi	1
Davao del Sur	1st	Marc Douglas Cagas IV	Nacionalista	1
Davao del Sur	2nd	Franklin Bautista	Lakas–Kampi	1
Davao Oriental	1st	Nelson Dayanghirang Sr.	Nacionalista	1
Davao Oriental	2nd	Thelma Almario	Lakas–Kampi	1
Dinagat Islands	Lone	Glenda Ecleo	Lakas–Kampi	3
Eastern Samar	Lone	Teodulo Coquilla	Independent (Note: Affiliated with Pwersa ng Masang Pilipino at election.)	1
Guimaras	Lone	JC Rahman Nava	Lakas–Kampi	1
Ifugao	Lone	Solomon Chungalao	Lakas–Kampi	3
Ilocos Norte	1st	Roque Ablan Jr.	Lakas–Kampi	3
Ilocos Norte	2nd	Bongbong Marcos	Nacionalista (Note: Affiliated with Kilusang Bagong Lipunan at election.)	1
Ilocos Sur	1st	Ronald Singson	Lakas–Kampi	1
Ilocos Sur	2nd	Eric Singson	Lakas–Kampi	3
Iloilo	1st	Janette Garin	Lakas–Kampi	2
Iloilo	2nd	Judy Syjuco	Lakas–Kampi	2
Iloilo	3rd	Arthur Defensor Sr.	Lakas–Kampi	3
Iloilo	4th	Ferjenel Biron	Nacionalista	2
Iloilo	5th	Niel Tupas Jr.	Liberal	1
Iloilo City	Lone	Raul Gonzalez Jr.	Lakas–Kampi	2
Isabela	1st	Rodolfo Albano III	Lakas–Kampi	2
Isabela	2nd	Edwin Uy	Liberal	3
Isabela	3rd	Bojie Dy	Lakas–Kampi	3
Isabela	4th	Giorgidi Aggabao	NPC (Note: Affiliated with the United Opposition at election.)	1
Kalinga	Lone	Manuel Agyao	Lakas–Kampi	1
La Union	1st	Victor Ortega	Lakas–Kampi	1
La Union	2nd	Tomas Dumpit Jr.	Lakas–Kampi	1
Laguna	1st	Dan Fernandez (Note: Dan Fernandez was removed by the House of Representatives Electoral Tribunal on April 30, 2009. Fernandez' removal was reversed by the Supreme Court on December 21, 2009.)	Lakas–Kampi	1
Laguna	2nd	Timmy Chipeco	Nacionalista	2
Laguna	3rd	Maria Evita Arago	Liberal	1
Laguna	4th	Edgar San Luis	NPC	1
Lanao del Norte	1st	Vicente Belmonte Jr.	Liberal	1
Lanao del Norte	2nd	Abdullah Dimaporo	Lakas–Kampi	3
Lanao del Sur	1st	Faysah Dumarpa	Nacionalista	3
Lanao del Sur	2nd	Pangalian Balindong	Lakas–Kampi	1
Las Piñas	Lone	Cynthia Villar	Nacionalista	3
Leyte	1st	Martin Romualdez	Lakas–Kampi	1
Leyte	2nd	Trinidad Apostol	Lakas–Kampi	3
Leyte	3rd	Andres Salvacion Jr.	Lakas–Kampi (Note: Affiliated with Partido Demokratiko Sosyalista ng Pilipinas at election.)	1
Leyte	4th	Eufrocino Codilla Sr.	Lakas–Kampi	3
Leyte	5th	Carmen Cari	Lakas–Kampi	3
Maguindanao	1st	Didagen Dilangalen	Independent	1
Maguindanao	2nd	Simeon Datumanong	Lakas–Kampi	2
Makati	1st	Teodoro Locsin Jr.	PDP–Laban	3
Makati	2nd	Abigail Binay	PDP–Laban	1
Malabon–Navotas	Lone	Alvin Sandoval (Note: Alvin Sandoval was removed by the House of Representatives Electoral Tribunal on September 24, 2009, after an electoral protest.)	Liberal	3
Malabon–Navotas	Lone	Josephine Lacson-Noel (Note: Josephine Lacson-Noel took office on November 16, 2009, after winning an electoral protest against Alvin Sandoval.)	NPC	1
Mandaluyong	Lone	Neptali Gonzales II	Liberal	1
Manila	1st	Benjamin Asilo	Liberal	1
Manila	2nd	Jaime Lopez	Lakas–Kampi	3
Manila	3rd	Zenaida Angping	NPC	1
Manila	4th	Trisha Bonoan-David	Lakas–Kampi	1
Manila	5th	Amado Bagatsing	KABAKA	1
Manila	6th	Benny Abante	Lakas–Kampi	2
Marikina	1st	Marcelino Teodoro	Independent	1
Marikina	2nd	Del de Guzman	Liberal	3
Marinduque	Lone	Carmencita Reyes	Liberal	1
Masbate	1st	Narciso Bravo Jr.	Lakas–Kampi	2
Masbate	2nd	Antonio Kho	Lakas–Kampi	1
Masbate	3rd	Rizalina Seachon-Lanete	NPC	2
Misamis Occidental	1st	Marina Clarete	Nacionalista	1
Misamis Occidental	2nd	Herminia Ramiro	Lakas–Kampi	3
Misamis Oriental	1st	Danilo Lagbas (Note: Danilo Lagbas died on June 7, 2008.)	Lakas	2
Misamis Oriental	2nd	Yevgeny Emano	Nacionalista	1
Mountain Province	Lone	Victor Dominguez (Note: Victor Dominguez died on February 8, 2008.)	Kampi	2
Muntinlupa	Lone	Ruffy Biazon	Liberal	3
Negros Occidental	1st	Jules Ledesma	NPC	1
Negros Occidental	2nd	Alfredo Marañon III	Lakas–Kampi	2
Negros Occidental	3rd	Jose Carlos Lacson	Lakas–Kampi	3
Negros Occidental	4th	Jeffrey Ferrer	NPC	1
Negros Occidental	5th	Iggy Arroyo	Lakas–Kampi	2
Negros Occidental	6th	Genaro Alvarez Jr.	NPC	1
Negros Oriental	1st	Jocelyn Sy-Limkaichong	Liberal	1
Negros Oriental	2nd	George Arnaiz	NPC	1
Negros Oriental	3rd	Pryde Henry Teves	Lakas–Kampi	1
Northern Samar	1st	Paul Daza	Liberal	1
Northern Samar	2nd	Emil Ong	Lakas–Kampi	1
Nueva Ecija	1st	Eduardo Nonato Joson	Independent	1
Nueva Ecija	2nd	Joseph Gilbert Violago	Lakas–Kampi	1
Nueva Ecija	3rd	Czarina Umali	Lakas–Kampi	1
Nueva Ecija	4th	Rodolfo Antonino	Lakas–Kampi	2
Nueva Vizcaya	Lone	Carlos Padilla	Nacionalista	1
Occidental Mindoro	Lone	Girlie Villarosa	Lakas–Kampi	2
Oriental Mindoro	1st	Rodolfo Valencia	Lakas–Kampi	2
Oriental Mindoro	2nd	Alfonso Umali Jr.	Liberal	3
Palawan	1st	Antonio Alvarez	Lakas–Kampi	2
Palawan	2nd	Abraham Mitra	Liberal	3
Pampanga	1st	Carmelo Lazatin Sr.	Lakas–Kampi	1
Pampanga	2nd	Mikey Arroyo	Lakas–Kampi	2
Pampanga	3rd	Aurelio Gonzales Jr.	Lakas–Kampi	1
Pampanga	4th	Anna York Bondoc	Nacionalista	2
Pangasinan	1st	Arthur Celeste	Lakas–Kampi	2
Pangasinan	2nd	Victor Agbayani	Liberal	1
Pangasinan	3rd	Maria Rachel Arenas	Lakas–Kampi	1
Pangasinan	4th	Jose de Venecia Jr.	Independent	3
Pangasinan	5th	Mark Cojuangco	NPC	3
Pangasinan	6th	Conrado Estrella III	NPC	3
Parañaque	1st	Eduardo Zialcita	Nacionalista	3
Parañaque	2nd	Roilo Golez	Liberal	2
Pasay	Lone	Jose Antonio Roxas	Lakas–Kampi	1
Pasig	Lone	Roman Romulo	Lakas–Kampi	1
Quezon	1st	Mark Enverga	Nacionalista	1
Quezon	2nd	Proceso Alcala	Liberal	2
Quezon	3rd	Danilo Suarez	Lakas–Kampi	2
Quezon	4th	Erin Tañada	Liberal	2
Quezon City	1st	Vincent Crisologo	Nacionalista	2
Quezon City	2nd	Annie Rosa Susano	PMP	2
Quezon City	3rd	Matias Defensor Jr.	Lakas–Kampi	2
Quezon City	4th	Nanette Castelo-Daza	Liberal	3
Quirino	Lone	Junie Cua	Lakas–Kampi	3
Rizal	1st	Jack Duavit	NPC	3
Rizal	2nd	Adeline Rodriguez-Zaldarriaga	NPC	1
Romblon	Lone	Eleandro Jesus Madrona	Nacionalista	1
Samar	1st	Reynaldo Uy	Lakas–Kampi	3
Samar	2nd	Sharee Ann Tan	Lakas–Kampi	1
San Jose del Monte	Lone	Arthur Robes	Lakas–Kampi	1
San Juan	Lone	Ronaldo Zamora	Nacionalista	3
Sarangani	Lone	Erwin Chiongbian	SARRO	3
Siquijor	Lone	Orlando Fua	Lakas–Kampi	1
Sorsogon	1st	Salvador Escudero	NPC	1
Sorsogon	2nd	Jose Solis	Lakas–Kampi	3
South Cotabato	1st	Darlene Antonino Custodio	NPC	3
South Cotabato	2nd	Arthur Pingoy Jr.	Lakas–Kampi	3
Southern Leyte	Lone	Roger Mercado	Lakas–Kampi	2
Sultan Kudarat	1st	Pax Mangudadatu	Lakas–Kampi	1
Sultan Kudarat	2nd	Arnulfo Go	Lakas–Kampi	1
Sulu	1st	Yusop Jikiri	NPC	1
Sulu	2nd	Abdulmunir Arbison	Lakas–Kampi	3
Surigao del Norte	1st	Francisco Matugas	Lakas–Kampi	1
Surigao del Norte	2nd	Guillermo Romarate Jr.	Lakas–Kampi	1
Surigao del Sur	1st	Philip Pichay	Lakas–Kampi	1
Surigao del Sur	2nd	Florencio Garay	Nacionalista	1
Taguig–Pateros	1st	Lani Cayetano	Nacionalista	1
Taguig	2nd	Henry Dueñas Jr. (Note: Henry Dueñas Jr. was removed by the House of Representatives Electoral Tribunal on February 25, 2010, after an electoral protest.)	Lakas–Kampi (Note: Affiliated with Kilusang Diwa ng Taguig at election.)	1
Taguig	2nd	Angelito Reyes (Note: Angelito Reyes took office on May 24, 2010, after winning an electoral protest against Henry Dueñas Jr.)	Lingkod Taguig	0
Tarlac	1st	Monica Louie Prieto-Teodoro	Lakas–Kampi	1
Tarlac	2nd	Jose Yap (Note: Jose Yap died on March 2, 2010.)	Lakas–Kampi	1
Tarlac	3rd	Jeci Lapus	Lakas–Kampi	1
Tawi-Tawi	Lone	Nur Jaafar	Lakas–Kampi	1
Valenzuela	1st	Rex Gatchalian	NPC	1
Valenzuela	2nd	Magi Gunigundo	Lakas–Kampi	1
Zambales	1st	Mitos Magsaysay	Lakas–Kampi	2
Zambales	2nd	Antonio Diaz	LM	2
Zamboanga City	1st	Beng Climaco	Liberal (Note: Affiliated with Laban ng Demokratikong Pilipino at election.)	1
Zamboanga City	2nd	Erbie Fabian	Nacionalista	2
Zamboanga del Norte	1st	Cecilia Jalosjos-Carreon	Lakas–Kampi	2
Zamboanga del Norte	2nd	Rosendo Labadlabad	Liberal	1
Zamboanga del Norte	3rd	Cesar Jalosjos	Lakas–Kampi	2
Zamboanga del Sur	1st	Victor Yu	NPC	1
Zamboanga del Sur	2nd	Antonio Cerilles	Lakas–Kampi	2
Zamboanga Sibugay	1st	Belma Cabilao	Nacionalista	3
Zamboanga Sibugay	2nd	Dulce Ann Hofer	Lakas–Kampi	1
Party-list		Vigor Maria Mendoza	1-UTAK	1
Party-list		Mariano Piamonte Jr.	A Teacher	1
Party-list		Ulpiano Sarmiento II (Note: 25 party-list representatives took office on April 28, 2009.)	A Teacher	0
Party-list		Leonardo Montemayor	ABA-AKO	0
Party-list		Jonathan dela Cruz	Abakada	0
Party-list		Robert Raymond Estrella	Abono	1
Party-list		Francisco Ortega III	Abono	0
Party-list		Catalina Leonen-Pizarro	ABS	0
Party-list		Nicanor Briones	AGAP	1
Party-list		Caesar Cobrador	AGAP	0
Party-list		Risa Hontiveros	Akbayan	2
Party-list		Walden Bello	Akbayan	0
Party-list		Rodante Marcoleta	Alagad	2
Party-list		Diogenes Osabel	Alagad	1
Party-list		Acmad Tomawis	ALIF	2
Party-list		Mujiv Hataman	AMIN	2
Party-list		Ariel Hernandez	AMIN	0
Party-list		Bem Noel	An Waray	2
Party-list		Neil Benedict Montejo	An Waray	0
Party-list		Pastor Alcover Jr.	ANAD	0
Party-list		Crispin Beltran (Note: Crispin Beltran died on May 20, 2008.)	Anakpawis	2
Party-list		Joel Manglungsod	Anakpawis	0
Party-list		Rafael V. Mariano (Note: Rafael V. Mariano took office on June 11, 2008, to succeed Crispin Beltran.)	Anakpawis	0
Party-list		Maria Lourdes Arroyo	Ang Kasangga	0
Party-list		Ernesto Pablo	APEC	2
Party-list		Edgar Valdez	APEC	2
Party-list		Narciso Santiago III	ARC	1
Party-list		Oscar Francisco	ARC	0
Party-list		Daryl Grace Abayon	AT	1
Party-list		Salvador Britanico	BANAT	0
Party-list		Jovito Palparan	Bantay	0
Party-list		Teodoro Casiño	Bayan Muna	2
Party-list		Satur Ocampo	Bayan Muna	2
Party-list		Neri Colmenares	Bayan Muna	0
Party-list		Maria Carissa Coscolluela	Buhay	1
Party-list		Irwin Tieng	Buhay	1
Party-list		Rene Velarde	Buhay	2
Party-list		Leonila Chavez (Note: Leonila Chavez died on January 29, 2010.)	Butil	1
Party-list		Agapito Guanlao	Butil	0
Party-list		Joel Villanueva	CIBAC	2
Party-list		Cinchona Cruz-Gonzales	CIBAC	1
Party-list		Domingo Espina (Note: Domingo Espina took office on May 24, 2010.)	Cocofed	1
Party-list		Guillermo Cua (Note: Guillermo Cua died on December 17, 2008.)	Coop-NATCCO	1
Party-list		Jose Ping-ay (Note: Jose Ping-ay took office on January 19, 2009, to succeed Guilllermo Cua.)	Coop-NATCCO	1
Party-list		Cresente Paez	Coop-NATCCO	0
Party-list		Luzviminda Ilagan	Gabriela	1
Party-list		Liza Maza	Gabriela	2
Party-list		Raymond Palatino	Kabataan	1
Party-list		Ranulfo Canonigo	Kakusa	0
Party-list		Godofredo Arquiza	Senior Citizens	0
Party-list		Raymond Mendoza	TUCP	0
Party-list		Teodoro Lim	Uni-Mad	0
Party-list		Estrella de Leon Santos	VFP	0
Party-list		Carol Jane Lopez	YACAP	1
Party-list		Haron Omar	YACAP	0

== See also ==
- Congress of the Philippines
- Senate of the Philippines
- House of Representatives of the Philippines
