= Floro Crisologo =

Filipino lawyer and politician (1908-1970)

The Honorable Floro Crisologo
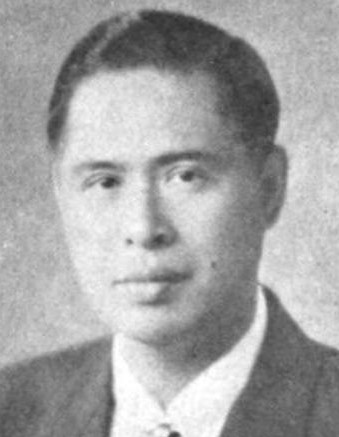
- Crisologo official portrait during the 3rd Congress.

Member of the House of Representatives from Ilocos Sur's 1st district
- In office December 30, 1961 – October 18, 1970
- Preceded by: Faustino Tobia
- Succeeded by: Vacant; Post later held by Chavit Singson
- In office May 25, 1946 – December 30, 1957
- Preceded by: Jesus Serrano
- Succeeded by: Faustino Tobia

Member of the Vigan Municipal Council
- In office 1934–1937

Personal details
- Born: Jose Floro Singson Crisologo; July 29, 1908 Vigan, Ilocos Sur, Philippine Islands
- Died: October 18, 1970 (aged 62) Vigan, Ilocos Sur, Philippines
- Party: Nacionalista (1934–1949; 1965–1970)
- Other political affiliations: Liberal (1949–1965)
- Spouse: Carmen Pichay
- Relations: Chavit Singson (nephew)
- Children: 8, including Vincent
- Education: University of the Philippines Diliman (LLB)
- Occupation: Politician
- Profession: Lawyer

Military service
- Allegiance: Philippines
- Branch/service: Philippine Army
- Years of service: 1941–1945
- Rank: Captain
- Unit: 14th Infantry Regiment (USAFIP-NL)
- Battles/wars: World War II; Battle of Bessang Pass

Floro Singson Crisologo (July 29, 1908 – October 18, 1970) was a Filipino lawyer and politician who represented the 1st district of Ilocos Sur in the Philippine Congress from 1946 until 1959 and from 1961 until his assassination in 1970.

== Early life ==
Crisologo was born on July 29, 1908, in Vigan, Ilocos Sur, to Moises de la Peña Crisologo and Victorina Querol Singson. He graduated from the University of the Philippines in 1933 and was admitted to the bar on November 6 that year. After setting up his law office in Vigan, he was elected in 1934 to the Municipal Council.

== Career ==
=== World War II ===
During the Second World War, Crisologo joined the guerrilla movement against the Japanese, reaching the rank of Captain. He participated in the Battle of Bessang Pass in 1945 as a member of the USAFIP-NL. He also served as Assistant Inspector General and member of the Court Martial of the Philippine Army's 2nd Infantry Division.

=== Congressional career ===
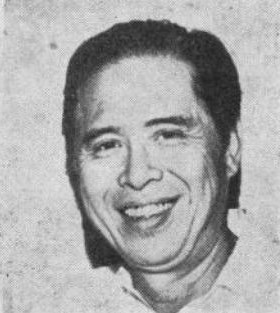
Crisologo in 1967

Crisologo's wartime conduct enabled him to get elected to the House of Representatives in 1946, where he represented the 1st district of Ilocos Sur and served until he lost reelection to Faustino Tobia in 1957. In 1961, he was elected again to the position and served until his assassination in 1970.

During his stint in Congress, Crisologo authored several laws such as the ones that established the University of Northern Philippines and the Social Security System, and the Tobacco Law. However, Crisologo became controversial due to his attempts to monopolize the tobacco industry in the province by establishing the Farmer's Cooperative Marketing Association (Facoma), which bought the tobacco harvest of the farmers and required all farmers to process their leaves at his drying plant. To enforce this monopoly, he also organized a 300-strong private army, which residents nicknamed the "saka-saka" or the "barefooted", and whose role was to "tax" trucks filled with tobacco bound for Manila for as much as $100 for each vehicle. He was also personally embroiled in incidents of political violence such as during the 1965 elections, when he ran into a convoy of his congressional rival Pablo Sanidad and engaged them in a shootout that killed seven people and injured five others.

The atrocities of the saka-saka later provoked national outrage after they assassinated a former mayor of Bantay, next to Vigan, in 1969 and burned the villages of Ora Este and Ora Centro in the same municipality in May 1970, in retaliation for their residents' support for Luis "Chavit" Singson, a nephew of Crisologo who became his political rival and had tried to circumvent his uncle's monopoly on tobacco, leading to the death of an elderly woman. After his son, Vincent, was arrested for leading the saka-saka in these incidents, Crisologo reportedly went to Malacañang and appealed for help from his ally, President Ferdinand Marcos, while demanding a greater share of rewards that Marcos had promised him in exchange for supporting his presidential reelection campaign in 1969. When Marcos refused, Crisologo reportedly then threatened to expose Marcos's role and that of his cousin Fabian Ver in cornering the tobacco monopoly in the Ilocos Region.

== Assassination ==
Shortly after his reported meeting with Marcos, Crisologo was killed on October 18, 1970 after being shot in the head while kneeling during a Mass at Vigan Cathedral by a gunman who stood directly behind him and then escaped among terrified churchgoers. His killer was never found and the case remains unsolved, although residents believe that the killing had something to do with tobacco excise taxes and was masterminded by ranking political and military leaders.

No special election was called to replace him in Congress, and his seat remained vacant until the dissolution of Congress in 1972 following the declaration of martial law by President Marcos and was only occupied again in 1987 by his nephew, Chavit Singson following Marcos's overthrow and the restoration of Congress.

Crisologo's murder and the defeat of his wife Carmeling to Chavit Singson in the gubernatorial race and that of his son Vincent in the mayoralty contest in Vigan to a brother of Chavit in 1971 led to the end of his family's political dominance in the province and the rise of the Singson family to prominence.

== Family and legacy ==
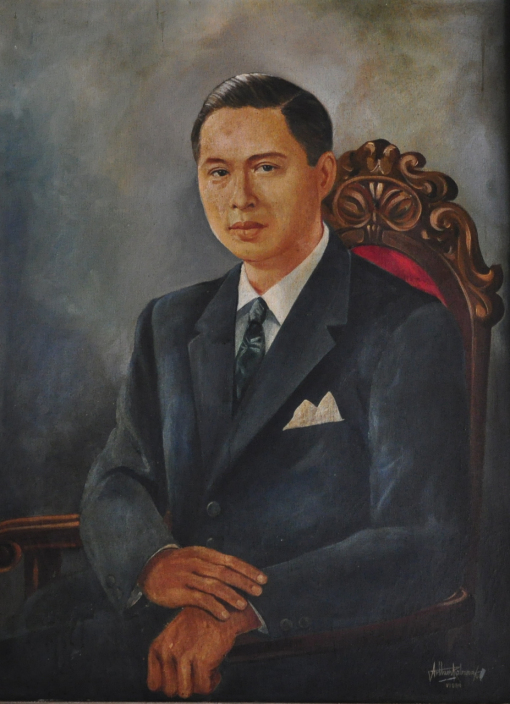
Portrait of Congressman Floro Crisologo

Crisologo was a scion of the Crisologo dynasty that dominated politics in Ilocos Sur through much of the 20th century. One of his ancestors was Marcelino "Mena" Crisólogo, a literary authority who also served as the province's first civil governor during the American occupation.

Crisologo's wife, Carmen (née Pichay; 1923–2018), better known as Carmeling, served as Governor of Ilocos Sur from 1964 to 1971 while he was in Congress. His son, Vincent Crisologo (born in 1947), was convicted for the burning of Ora Este and Ora Centro and jailed until he was pardoned by Marcos in 1980. He later became a politician and congressman in his own right in Quezon City.

Crisologo's ancestral home in Vigan is now a museum dedicated to his life and displaying his memorabilia.

== In popular culture ==
Crisologo was portrayed by Eddie Rodriguez in the 1991 film Bingbong: The Vincent Crisologo Story and by Eddie Garcia in the 2003 film Chavit.

== See also ==
- List of Philippine legislators who died in office
