= Hadjiman Hataman Salliman =

Filipino politician

The Honorable Hadjiman Hataman Salliman
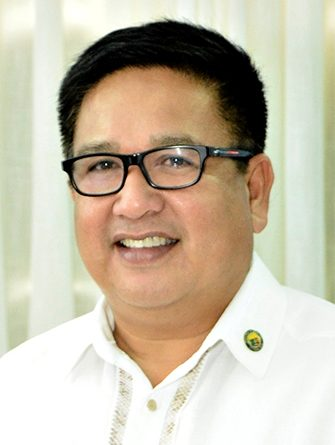

Vice Governor of Basilan
- Incumbent
- Assumed office June 30, 2025
- Governor: Mujiv Hataman
- Preceded by: Yusop Alano

Governor of Basilan
- In office June 30, 2016 – June 30, 2025
- Vice Governor: Yusop Alano
- Preceded by: Jum Jainudin Akbar
- Succeeded by: Mujiv Hataman

Member of the Philippine House of Representatives from Basilan's lone district
- In office June 30, 2010 – June 30, 2016
- Preceded by: Vacant (post last held by Wahab Akbar who died in 2007)
- Succeeded by: Jum Jainudin Akbar

Personal details
- Born: August 12, 1962 (age 64) Sumisip, Basilan, Philippines
- Party: PFP (2024–present)
- Other political affiliations: PDP–Laban (2016–2024); Liberal (2004–2009; 2010–2016); Independent (2009–2010)
- Relations: Mujiv Hataman (brother)
- Occupation: Politician

Hadjiman Sabbihi Hataman Saliman, also known as Jim Hataman Saliman or Jim Saliman, is a Filipino politician who served as the governor of Basilan from 2016 to 2025. He previously served as the representative of Basilan's lone district from 2010 to 2016. Despite his nickname, he should not be confused with Benjamin Hataman—his cousin—who was arrested on murder charges for the assassination of Wahab Akbar in 2007. Hadjiman himself may or may not have been involved; he competed and lost against Akbar for the same congressional seat in 2007, and the two became bitter enemies.

== Background ==
Hataman was born in Buli-Buli, Sumisip. His two younger brothers are also influential politicians; Mujiv Hataman is the former regional governor of the Autonomous Region in Muslim Mindanao (2011–2019), and "Boy" Hataman was previously mayor of Sumisip.

== Political career ==
=== Mayor of Sumisip ===
Jim served as mayor of Sumisip from 2001 until 2004, when he was replaced by his brother Boy.

=== Rivalry with Wahab Akbar ===
In 2007, Jim ran as a candidate for Basilan's lone congressional district and competed head to head with rival Wahab Akbar, leading to violence between the two camps. Supporters of Akbar were injured in a May 2007 attack by unidentified assailants who may have been connected to Hataman. Jim likewise filed a petition with the Commission on Elections (COMELEC) to disqualify Akbar as a candidate, claiming his opponent employed three armed groups to harass him and ally Gerry Salapuddin in the leadup to the elections. (Salapuddin was running for governor, and was running against one of the three wives of Akbar.)

"All these armed groups are now being funded and mobilized by respondent to harass, intimidate and coerce his political opponents like herein petitioner," Salliman said in his 10-page petition filed with the Comelec. He also accused Akbar "of having given material consideration, in order to influence, induce and, corrupt the voters such as when respondent gave through his designated ally P200,000 purposely to buy votes." Salliman claimed to have witnesses who executed affidavits to support his accusations against the herein respondent. Akbar brushed aside petitioner's accusations against him and branded it as mere black propaganda on his candidacy for congressman.

Hataman lost the race to Akbar.

=== Accusations in Akbar Assassination ===
Captured suspect and former Tuburan town mayor Hajuron Jamiri fingered Mujiv and Jim Hataman as being the masterminds of the November 2007 bombing at the House of Representatives that killed four people including rival Wahab Akbar. Jamiri claimed in a two-page affidavit that Mujiv and Jim wanted Akbar dead because Basilan would "not be at peace" under his administration. Another suspect, Cainar Aunal, similarly claimed that it was Jim Hataman who gave the order, and that they met in a coffee shop in a Quezon City mall in October to discuss the plan.

The Hataman brothers had denied the allegations, however, and Jimiri's statement was eventually retracted. Mujiv claimed that Jimiri had been tortured and that his "confession" came under duress. Fellow conspirator Ikram Indama likewise later claimed that Salapudin, Bayan Judda, Caidar Aunal, Adham Kusain, Jang Hataman, Jim Hataman and Mujiv Hataman were all not involved in the Batasan blast, and that he was forced by the Akbars to admit to the bombing and to implicate the others.

=== Continued Protest Against Akbar ===
Following Akbar's death, Hadjiman's protest against Akbar held up new special elections to replace the slain politician's seat. Hadjiman insisted on having his electoral protest resolved by the House of Representatives' Electoral Tribunal, leaving the seat vacant until the 2010 elections, where he ran and won.
