= Legislative districts of Basilan =

Legislative district of the Philippines

The legislative districts of Basilan are the representations of the province of Basilan in the various national legislatures of the Philippines. The province is currently represented in the lower house of the Congress of the Philippines through its lone congressional district.

== History ==
Prior to gaining separate representation, areas now under the jurisdiction of Basilan were represented under Zamboanga Province (1898–1899; 1935–1953), the Department of Mindanao and Sulu (1917–1935), Zamboanga del Sur (1953–1972) and Region IX (1978–1984).

Even after separating from Zamboanga City and receiving its own charter on June 16, 1948, the city of Basilan remained part of the representations of the Province of Zamboanga (pursuant to Section 42 of Republic Act No. 288) and of the Province of Zamboanga del Sur (pursuant to Section 7 of Republic Act No. 711).

The promulgation of Presidential Decree No. 356 on December 27, 1973, created the province of Basilan out of most of the territory of the former city of Basilan. The city of Basilan itself was delimited only to the downtown area of present-day Isabela until P.D. 840 finally abolished the city on December 11, 1975; the former city's territory, along with the municipality of Malamawi, was merged into the municipality of Isabela. The new province was represented in the Interim Batasang Pambansa as part of Region IX from 1978 to 1984.

Basilan was granted separate representation for the first time in 1984, when it returned one representative, elected at large, to the Regular Batasang Pambansa.

Under the new Constitution which was proclaimed on February 11, 1987, the province constituted a lone congressional district, and elected its member to the restored House of Representatives starting that same year.

== Current districts ==
Legislative Districts and Congressional Representatives of Basilan
District	Current Representative	Party	Population (2015)	Area
Lone	Yusop Alano (since 2025); Lantawan	PFP	203,828	1327.23 km^{2}

== See also ==
- Legislative district of Mindanao and Sulu
- Legislative district of Zamboanga
  - Legislative districts of Zamboanga del Sur
