= Tahira Ismael-Sansawi =

Filipino politician

Tahira Ismael-Sansawi (also Tahira Ismael) (PMP) is a Filipino politician and was mayor of Lantawan in Basilan from 2001 to 2010. She was also the president of the influential Mayors League of Basilan. She is the niece of slain political leader Wahab Akbar.

== Background ==
Tahira is married to Army Captain Sansawi Ismael, a former top MNLF officer and now a military integree. Her brother is a policeman in Basilan.

== Political Activity ==
In 2002, as mayor, Ismael accused the Philippine military of killing three civilians in a mistaken counterterrorism operation targeting Abu Sayyaf bandits on Dasalan island off Basilan. Ismael identified the victims as Imam Santa Sala, 60; his wife Salama Ambang, 58; and Isnawi Ingagal, 38. "Your men killed innocent civilians, and you have the nerve to declare they are Abu Sayyaf!" Ismael told Col. Renato Miranda, chief of the 2nd Marine Brigade, during a Crisis Management Committee meeting in Isabela City.

Ismael was re-elected for a third and final term as mayor in 2007, with a lead of 3,000 votes out of a total of 7,079 cast in her favor. After the death of Wahab Akbar in mid-2007, she contested the vacant seat but was opposed by others in the Akbar clan.

In the midst of counterterrorism operations in 2007, Ismael sought a greater role for local government units (LGUs) in the province to pursue the suspects behind the July 10, 2007 attack that killed numerous marines. "This is Basilan and we know who these people are," Ismael said as she proposed to let the LGUs reactivate their barangay intelligence system in aid of arresting the suspects.
