= Luzviminda Ilagan =

Filipina politician

The Honorable Luzviminda Ilagan
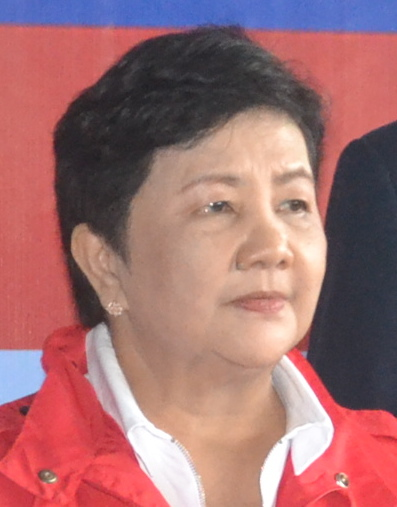
- Ilagan in 2018

Member of the Philippine House of Representatives for Gabriela Partylist
- In office June 30, 2007 – June 30, 2016 Serving with Emerenciana A. De Jesus

Member of the Davao City Council from the 1st district
- In office June 30, 1998 – June 30, 2001
- In office June 20, 1986 – February 1, 1988

Personal details
- Party: Gabriela (partylist; 2007–present)
- Other political affiliations: HTL (local party; 2015–2016); LAMMP (1998–2001)
- Spouse: Atty. Laurente Ilagan (deceased)
- Profession: Development worker

Luzviminda "Luz" Calolot-Ilagan is a Filipina development worker and former congresswoman. She represented the Gabriela Women's Partylist in the 14th Congress of the Philippines from 2007 to 2016.

In September 2017, she was appointed by President Rodrigo Duterte as Undersecretary for Legislative Liaison Affairs and Special Presidential Directives in the Mindanao Region of the Department of Social Welfare and Development.

== Early life and career ==
Luzviminda Ilagan is the wife of Atty. Laurente "Larry" Ilagan. She was appointed city councilor during the Cory Aquino administration, and elected in the 1998 elections. Ilagan failed to win as city councilor for Davao City's 3rd district in 2016.

She was the recipient of the Datu Bago Awards in 2007.

Ilagan was appointed the undersecretary of the Department of Social Welfare and Development in September 2017.

In 2024, she was in favor of passing the divorce bill.

== Batasang Pambansa bombing ==
Congresswoman Ilagan was injured in the 2007 bombing of the Philippine House of Representatives Building, along with Negros Oriental Congressman Pryde Henry Teves, whose eardrums and legs were damaged severely. Congressman Wahab Akbar of Basilan was killed.

== See also ==
- Ninotchka Rosca
- Liza Maza
