= Cherrylyn Santos =

Filipino politician

Cherrylyn Santos (formerly Akbar) (Lakas-Kampi-CMD) is the 1st lady mayor of Isabela City, Basilan, Philippines and former wife of deceased strongman Wahab Akbar.

She was vice mayor of Isabela City for 2016 to 2019, a part of and former provincial capital of Basilan that is administratively part of Zamboanga Peninsula, and was previously elected as mayor in the same city for 3 terms.

== Background ==
Cherrylyn was born in 1976 in Isabela City, Basilan. She graduated at Claret College of Isabela and became a Barangay official for many years and she became an employee at the provincial capital during Wahab Akbar's term as governor. Born Roman Catholic, she converted to Islam when she became Akbar's second wife. She holds a master's degree in public administration from the Basilan State College and a master's degree in business administration from the Furigay College Institute.

== Political Activity ==
Cherry told reporters in 2007 that despite her husband, fellow wives, and several children running for office, "We're not trying to build a political dynasty. We just want to serve the people of Basilan and we could do it better if our family is elected into office... Dynasties are not necessarily evil. My husband had worked hard for his position and we will do the same. If we deserve to win, so be it."

She was appointed Assistant Secretary in the Office of the President last June 22, 2020.
