= Basilan State University =

Public university in Basilan, Philippines

- Pamantasang Estado ng Basilan (Filipino)
- Former names: UP Land Grant High School (1966‑1976); UP Sta Clara Barangay High School (1976‑1978); Basilan National Agro-Industrial School (1978‑1983); Basilan National Agro-Industrial College (1983‑1984); Basilan State College(1984‑2026)
- Type: State University
- Established: 1966; 60 years ago
- President: Dr. Haipa Abdurahim-Salain
- Vice-president: Dr. Rachel L. Rodriguez (VP for Academic Affairs)
- Location: Isabela City, Basilan, Philippines; 6°41′31″N 121°57′39″E
- Newspaper: The Chronicler
- Website: bassc.edu.ph
- Location in Mindanao Location in the Philippines

Basilan State University (BasSU) is a public higher education institution in the island province of Basilan, Philippines. Its main campus is located in Isabela City with satellite campuses in Lamitan, Maluso and Tipo-Tipo and an agricultural campus in Santa Clara, Lamitan. The current college president is Dr. Haipa A. Salain.

In 2021, Republic Act No. 11554 was signed into law, providing for the conversion of Basilan State College into a state university.

== History ==
=== Agricultural high school ===
The institution was founded in 1966 as the UP Land Grant High School in Santa Clara, Lamitan, Basilan. Its establishment was authorized by the Santa Clara Barangay Charter. During its first year of operation, the school accommodated a total enrollment of 120 students divided into two classes each for the first-year and second-year levels. A key asset in the formation of the school was a donation of 18 hectares of land from the UP Land Grant in 1966, providing the physical space necessary for agricultural and trade instruction.

Ten years later, in 1976, the school was converted to the UP Santa Clara Barangay High School through the same barangay charter5. This conversion was enacted to expand educational access for the growing youth and adult populations in the province.

In 1978, Presidential Decree No. 1303 renamed the institution to the Basilan National Agro-Industrial School. During this period, the institution operated with an annual budget of ₱650,000.00. The administration integrated secondary curricula for agriculture and trade into the high school program. This curricular shift was supported by the availability of agriculture graduates working as high school teaching personnel and the utilization of the 18-hectare land grant for practical applications.

=== Elevation to college status ===
The transition to tertiary education was initiated through the coordinated efforts of then Department of Education, Culture and Sports. The objective was to maximize the use of the 18-hectare property. On April 7, 1983, Batas Pambansa Blg. 363 converted the high school into the Basilan National Agro-Industrial College.

Initially, the college limited its course offerings to agriculture and manpower skills. The administration focused on the physical development of the campus, establishing demonstration farms and a mini forest, and designing college curricula based on agro-industrial theories.

A broader structural transformation occurred in 1984. Gerry Salapuddin, the former Chairman of the Moro National Liberation Front who had reintegrated into the political system, requested the establishment of a state college in Basilan to support socio-economic development. Then President Ferdinand Marcos approved this request by issuing Presidential Decree No. 1943 on June 27, 19846. This decree converted the Basilan National Agro-Industrial College into Basilan State College.

The first president of the newly formed state college, Dr. Carolina San Luis, directed the relocation of the main campus to a 4-hectare lot in Sumagdang, Isabela. The original campus in Santa Clara, Lamitan, was retained for agricultural programs. The administration augmented school infrastructure, increased teaching items for the high school and college levels, and established extension sites in the municipalities of Maluso and Lamitan. Starting in 1985, funding for the operation and maintenance of the state college was formally included in the annual budget of the National Government.

=== Conversion to University Status ===
The institution functioned as a state college for 37 years before undergoing legislative action for university status. Originated in the House of Representatives, the legislation was sponsored by Basilan Representative and House Deputy Speaker Mujiv Hataman, alongside co-authors Representative Amihilda Sangcopan, Representative Joey Salceda, and Representative Eric Go Yap. The proponents articulated that the conversion aimed to supply the province with skilled professionals and support post-conflict stabilization efforts.

It was passed by the House on September 28, 2020, and by the Senate on May 24, 2021. Then President Rodrigo Duterte approved and signed Republic Act No. 11554 on June 24, 2021. The law established the main campus in Barangay Sumagdang, Isabela City, and formally integrated the extension campuses located in Tipo-Tipo, Maluso, Lamitan, and Isabela City.

== Board of Regents ==
Section 4 of Republic Act No. 11554 grants Basilan State University the general powers of a corporation as defined under Batas Pambansa Blg. 68, the Corporation Code of the Philippines. The exercise of these corporate powers is vested exclusively in the Board of Regents and the President of the university. Section 5 establishes the Board of Regents as the governing body. The composition of the Board is defined by law and includes representatives from national government agencies, legislative bodies, and university stakeholders.

Chairperson: Chairperson of the Commission on Higher Education
Co-Chairperson: University President
Member: Chairperson of the Committee on Higher, Technical and Vocational Education of the Senate (or its representative)
Member: Chairperson of the Committee on Higher, and Technical Education of the House of Representatives (or its representative)
Member: Regional Director of the Department of Economy, Planning, and Development (DEPDev)
Member: Regional Director of the Department of Science and Technology (DOST)
Member: Regional Director of the Technical Education and Skills Development Authority
Member: Regional Director of the Department of Agriculture
Member: President of the federation of faculty associations of the university
Member: President of the federation of student councils of the university
Member: President of the federation of alumni associations of the university
Members (Two positions): Prominent citizens from the private sector distinguished in their professions

The two prominent citizens are appointed by the Board from a list of at least five qualified persons in the Province of Basilan, recommended by a search committee. These citizens serve a term of two years, while the federation presidents serve terms coterminous with their respective offices.

=== Powers and duties of the board ===
Section 6 of Republic Act No. 11554 outlines the specific powers of the Board of Regents. The Board is authorized to promulgate and implement policies on education, science, and technology in accordance with the Constitution and Republic Act No. 7722, the Higher Education Act of 1994. The Board holds the authority to fix and adjust tuition fees and other necessary school charges after consultation with concerned sectors. The law dictates that any income generated by the university from tuition fees, charges, auxiliary services, and land grants constitutes a special trust fund deposited in an authorized government depository bank. The Board is empowered to disburse these funds strictly for instruction, research, and institutional development. If the university cannot pursue appropriated projects due to external factors, the Board may authorize the use of funds for any purpose necessary to attain institutional objectives.

Republic Act No. 11554 grants the Board the power to adopt modern and innovative modes of transmitting knowledge, including information technology, dual training systems, open distance learning, and community laboratories. The Board may award honorary degrees in recognition of public service or academic contributions and authorize the awarding of certificates for nondegree and nontraditional courses.

Section 6 also authorizes the Board to collaborate with the governing boards of other state universities and colleges under the supervision of the Commission on Higher Education and the Department of Budget and Management, to restructure the university for efficiency. Furthermore, the Board can absorb non-chartered tertiary institutions within Basilan and Region IX as branches and external centers to promote equal access to educational opportunities.

Section 15 guarantees the university academic freedom and institutional autonomy as mandated under paragraph 2, Section 5 of Article XIV of the Philippine Constitution.

== University administration ==
The university administration is led by a President, who is appointed by the Board of Regents based on the recommendation of a duly constituted search committee. Section 8 of Republic Act No. 11554 establishes the President's term at four years, with eligibility for reappointment. The legislation mandated that the incumbent President of the former state college serve as the first President of the university to ensure administrative continuity, provided they met the required qualifications.

The administrative framework includes an Academic Council, detailed in Section 12, which is responsible for formulating academic policies, reviewing curricular offerings, setting admission and graduation requirements, and enforcing rules of discipline, subject to Board approval.

== Financial allocations ==
Operating the university is accompanied by modifications to the national budget allocation for the institution. Financial records indicate a steady increase in the general appropriations assigned to the institution prior to and during the conversion process.

Funding on the annual budget (General Appropriation Acts) was designed to support the facility upgrades and structural reforms mandated by the Commission on Higher Education for full university operations. The university is also subsidized by Republic Act No. 10931, or the Universal Access to Quality Tertiary Education Act. Section 6 of the university charter requires the Board to adopt a socialized scheme of tuition to grant free tuition and exemptions from miscellaneous fees for qualified Filipino students enrolled in undergraduate programs.

== Academic Colleges and Course Offerings ==
Basilan State University is organized into several academic colleges that deliver instruction across a range of disciplines. The curriculum is structured to address the specific agricultural, educational, commercial, and technical workforce demands of the region.

College of Arts and Sciences

Bachelor of Arts in English
Bachelor of Science in Biology
Bachelor of Science in Mathematics
Bachelor of Arts in Islamic Studies
Bachelor of Science in Social Works

College of Education

Bachelor of Elementary Education
Bachelor of Secondary Education (Majors in English, Mathematics, Science, Social Studies)
Bachelor of Early Childhood Education

College of Business and Public Administration

Bachelor of Science in Business Administration
Bachelor of Science in Office Administration
Bachelor of Science in Hospitality Management

College of Criminal Justice

Bachelor of Science in Criminology

College of Health and Sciences

Bachelor of Science in Nutrition and Dietetics

College of Information, Communication, Computer and Technology

Bachelor of Science in Information Technology
Bachelor of Science in Industrial Technology
Technical-Vocational Education

College of Agriculture

Bachelor of Science in Agriculture
Bachelor of Science in Fisheries

Graduate School

Doctorate in Education (Major in Education Administration)
Master of Science in Public Administration
Master of Arts in Education.

== Accreditation and Quality Assurance ==
The university subjects its academic programs to periodic evaluations by the Accrediting Agency of Chartered Colleges and Universities in the Philippines (AACCUP). This process assesses the institution's readiness, identifies weaknesses in educational programs, and provides a basis for strategic improvement.

The institution achieved Level I and Level II accreditations for various programs while operating as a state college. Evaluation surveys have been conducted on the Doctorate in Education, Master in Public Administration, Master of Arts in Education, Bachelor of Science in Criminology, Bachelor of Science in Nutrition and Dietetics, Bachelor of Early Childhood Education, Bachelor of Science in Hospitality Management, Bachelor of Science in Social Works, and Bachelor of Arts in Islamic Studies.

Internal evaluations utilizing a multi-sectoral approach have also been implemented to measure teaching performance. Assessments conducted by the teachers themselves, peer reviewers, supervisors, and students collectively rated the teaching performance of the faculty as "Outstanding" across all parameters. The highest-ranked performance areas were Management of Learning, Knowledge of Subject Matter, Teaching for Independent Learning, and Commitment.

To maintain university typology under the guidelines of the Commission on Higher Education, the institution is required to ensure that at least 20 percent of its full-time faculty are actively involved in research. Faculty research outputs encompass a range of disciplines. Published studies affiliated with the university include assessments of continuous quality improvement in teacher education institutions, analyses of leadership styles among middle managers, biodiversity assessments of avifauna in forest reservations, and evaluations of demographic-based grammatical competence.

== Community Extension Programs ==
The university utilizes the expertise of its academic colleges to implement community interventions.

A primary example of this mandate is the Barangay Linuan Transformation Project in the municipality of Al-Barka. The university implemented a multi-dimensional extension program targeting marginalized areas, focusing on education, health, and economic capability.

The extension office established a Peace Education program to provide community training on conflict resolution. Evaluation data indicated that the program increased participant knowledge of peace-related issues and contributed to the reduction of violence through dialogue. The university partnered with the Landbank Countryside Development Foundation Inc. to conduct a Financial Literacy Program, which instructed community members, particularly women, in financial management.

The university also integrated an Islamic Education Program to promote religious values, which participants reported influenced communal behavior positively. Agricultural programs trained residents in sustainable practices to improve crop yield and food security, while the Health Education program provided instruction on well-being and disease prevention. The university facilitated community events, including the Iftar Program during Ramadan, the Qurbani Program, an orphans program, and community weddings. In partnership with the World Assembly of Muslim Youth, the university supported the physical construction of a school building and a community center in Barangay Linuan.

== Regional integration and Policy context ==
The operational objectives of Basilan State University are closely aligned with broader stabilization and development policies within the Bangsamoro Autonomous Region in Muslim Mindanao.

The availability of undergraduate, technical, and graduate programs within the province of Basilan reduces the necessity for students to travel to Zamboanga City or other urban centers for higher education, expanding access for lower-income households.

In the socio-cultural domain, students from the university have participated in and won regional competitions. During the cultural presentations for the institution's 34th founding anniversary, the College of Education secured the top position in a competition showcasing the native dances of the Yakan and Tausug communities.

The university functions within a regional network of academic institutions. It signed a Memorandum of Understanding with the University of the Philippines Diliman, and other higher education institutions in the Zamboanga City-Sulu-Tawi-Tawi corridor, including Mindanao State University–Buug, Mindanao State University–Tawi-Tawi College of Technology and Oceanography, Sulu State University, and Western Mindanao State University. This agreement focuses on community development in fishing communities, mapping the vitality of indigenous languages, advancing peace and development programs, and strengthening the research competencies of faculty members across the participating institutions. The university also maintains partnerships with national agencies, such as the Department of Interior and Local Government and the Anti-Terrorism Council Program Management Center, to support programs related to social healing and the prevention of violent extremism.
