= Abdulgani Salapuddin =

Filipino politician

Abdulghani A. Salapuddin
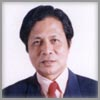
- Official portrait, 2004

Member of the House of Representatives from the Basilan's at-large district
- In office June 30, 1998 – June 30, 2007
- Preceded by: Candu Muarip
- Succeeded by: Wahab Akbar

Governor of Basilan
- In office June 30, 1988 – June 30, 1998

Personal details
- Born: Abdulghani A. Salapuddin; 1952 (age 73–74) Tuburan, Basilan, Philippines
- Party: Lakas (1998–2007); LDP (1988–1998)
- Education: Basilan State College (BA)

Abdulghani "Gerry" A. Salapuddin is a Filipino politician and former three-term congressman (1998–2007). He also served as governor of Basilan (1988–98) and was at least partly responsible for much of the progress made in Basilan in the 1990s.

== Background ==
Salapuddin was born in 1952 in Tuburan, Basilan. He graduated with a bachelor's degree in political science from the Basilan State College, and returned for graduate studies. He became a guerrilla with the Moro National Liberation Front and fought for 14 years. In 1983, he resigned his position as a provincial commander in the MNLF to run for political office.

== Political activity ==
In 1988 Salapuddin ran for and won the governor seat in Basilan by 1,552 votes over Louise Alano, a former acting governor appointed by former President Aquino. Under Salapuddin, Basilan experienced a period of relative prosperity including new trade missions, infrastructure improvement, development aid, business assistance and help for the poor. Salapuddin frequently acted as negotiator when civilians were taken hostage by rebel groups, using his contacts and political wiles. He also served as acting chairman of the MNLF in Basilan and as president of the Young Muslim Professional Association.

In 1993, President Fidel Ramos suspended Salapuddin for 60 days on charges of "serious misconduct, oppression, gross negligence, abuse of authority, dereliction of duty and maladministration," one of many powerful politicians targeted in what was considered a crackdown on corruption and nepotism.

In 1998, Salapuddin sought the post of congressman for Basilan's lone district and won, proceeding to serve in three successive terms and two terms as deputy speaker for Mindanao in the House of Representatives. In 2007, he ran again for mayor but lost to the wife of Wahab Akbar, Jum Jainudin. Following Akbar's death by assassination in Quezon City the same year, he requested increased security after his former driver was accused as one of the suspects. He was initially cleared of any involvement, but was later the target of an arrest warrant.

Salapuddin has somewhat faded from prominence since the 2007 elections, when he failed to be elected governor and his power bloc likewise fared poorly.
