= Basilan's at-large congressional district =

House of Representatives of the Philippines legislative district

- Constituency for the House of Representatives of the Philippines
- Location of Basilan within the Philippines
- Province: Basilan
- Region: Zamboanga Peninsula (Isabela); Bangsamoro (Rest of Basilan)
- Population: 556,586 (2020)
- Electorate: 232,124 (2025)
- Area: 1,327.23 km^{2} (512.45 sq mi)

Current constituency
- Created: 1984
- Representative: Yusop T. Alano
- Political party: PFP
- Congressional bloc: Majority

Basilan's at-large congressional district refers to the lone congressional district of the Philippines in the province of Basilan. The province has been represented in the country's national legislatures since 1984. It first elected a representative provincewide at-large during the 1984 Philippine parliamentary election following the restoration of provincial and city district representation in the Batasang Pambansa where Basilan had previously been included in the regionwide representation of Western Mindanao (Region IX) for the interim parliament. The province, created by the 1973 separation from Zamboanga del Sur of the entire island with its two municipal districts and the municipality of Isabela outside its poblacion which was earlier organized as the City of Basilan separated from Zamboanga City, was formerly represented as part of Zamboanga del Sur's, Zamboanga's and Department of Mindanao and Sulu's at-large representations in earlier legislatures. Since the 1987 restoration of Congress following the ratification of a new constitution, Basilan has been entitled to one member in the House of Representatives. It is currently represented in the 20th Congress by Yusop T. Alano of the Partido Federal ng Pilipinas (PFP).

== Representation history ==
#	Image	Member	Term of office		Batasang Pambansa	Party	Electoral history
#	Image	Member	Start	End	Batasang Pambansa	Party	Electoral history
=== Basilan's at-large district for the Regular Batasang Pambansa ===
District created February 1, 1984 from Region IX's at-large district.
1		Candu I. Muarip	July 23, 1984	March 25, 1986	2nd	UNIDO (CCA)	Elected in 1984.
#	Image	Member	Term of office		Congress	Party	Electoral history
#	Image	Member	Start	End	Congress	Party	Electoral history
=== Basilan's at-large district for the House of Representatives of the Philippines ===
District re-created February 2, 1987.
2		Alvin G. Dans	June 30, 1987	June 30, 1992	8th	Lakas ng Bansa	Elected in 1987.
3		Elnorita P. Tugung	June 30, 1992	June 30, 1995	9th	Lakas	Elected in 1992.
(1)		Candu I. Muarip	June 30, 1995	June 30, 1998	10th	LDP	Elected in 1995.
4		Abdulgani Salapuddin	June 30, 1998	June 30, 2007	11th	Lakas	Elected in 1998.
4		Abdulgani Salapuddin	June 30, 1998	June 30, 2007	12th	Lakas	Re-elected in 2001.
4		Abdulgani Salapuddin	June 30, 1998	June 30, 2007	13th	Lakas	Re-elected in 2004.
5		Wahab Akbar	June 30, 2007	November 13, 2007	14th	Liberal	Elected in 2007. Died in office.
—	vacant		November 13, 2007	June 30, 2010	14th	–	No special election held to fill vacancy.
6		Hadjiman Hataman Salliman	June 30, 2010	June 30, 2016	15th	Liberal	Elected in 2010.
6		Hadjiman Hataman Salliman	June 30, 2010	June 30, 2016	16th	Liberal	Re-elected in 2013.
7		Jum Jainudin Akbar	June 30, 2016	November 11, 2016	17th	Liberal	Elected in 2016. Died in office.
—	vacant		November 11, 2016	June 30, 2019	17th	–	No special election held to fill vacancy.
8		Mujiv Hataman	June 30, 2019	June 30, 2025	18th	Liberal	Elected in 2019.
8		Mujiv Hataman	June 30, 2019	June 30, 2025	19th	BUP	Re-elected 2022.
8		Yusop T. Alano	June 30, 2025	Incumbent	20th	PFP	Elected in 2025.

== Election results ==
=== 2025 ===
Candidate	Party	Votes	%
Yusop Alano	Partido Federal ng Pilipinas	131,501	56.51
Hanie Bud	Liberal Party	101,206	43.49
Total		232,707	100.00
Registered voters/turnout		315,601	–
Partido Federal ng Pilipinas gain from Basilan Unity Party			
Source: Commission on Elections

=== 2022 ===
2022 Philippine House of Representatives elections
Party	Candidate	Votes	%
BUP	Mujiv Hataman (Incumbent)	133,784	68.04
UBJP	Yasmeen Junaid	61,254	31.15
Independent	Abdulhan Jaujohn	826	0.42
PDDS	Mohammad Alih Samuin	766	0.39
Total votes		196,630	100.00

=== 2019 ===
2019 Philippine House of Representatives elections
Party	Candidate	Votes	%
Liberal	Mujiv Hataman	121,901	81.08
KDP	Omar Akbar	28,450	18.92
Total votes		150,351	100.00
Liberal hold			

=== 2016 ===
2016 Philippine House of Representatives elections
Party	Candidate	Votes	%
Liberal	Jum Jainudin Akbar	114,620	
Nacionalista	Gerry Salapuddin	34,408	
Independent	Al-Rasheed Sakkalahul	5,105	
NPC	Sander Antig	323	
Total votes			100.00
Liberal hold			

=== 2010 ===
Candidate	Party	Votes	%
Hadjiman Hataman Salliman	Independent	48,459	33.71
Abdulgani Salapuddin	Nacionalista Party	36,196	25.18
Tahira Ismael	Pwersa ng Masang Pilipino	15,581	10.84
Rajam Akbar	Aksyon Demokratiko	13,443	9.35
Leonardo Pioquinto	Independent	12,124	8.43
Sakib Salajin	Lakas–Kampi–CMD	11,657	8.11
Ibno Turabin	Bagumbayan–VNP	2,580	1.79
Muctar Muarip	Independent	1,686	1.17
Hadja Salwa Julwadi	Independent	1,214	0.84
Usdatz Jhularab Sampang	Independent	478	0.33
Ondos Sahdin	Independent	323	0.22
Total		143,741	100.00
Valid votes		143,741	89.81
Invalid/blank votes		16,310	10.19
Total votes		160,051	100.00
Independent gain from Liberal Party			
Source: Commission on Elections

== See also ==
- Legislative districts of Basilan
