= Yusop Alano =

Filipino politician (born 1976)

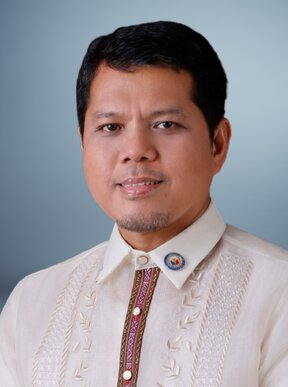
- Official portrait, 2025

Member of the Philippine House of Representatives from Basilan's lone district
- Incumbent
- Assumed office June 30, 2025
- Preceded by: Mujiv Hataman

Vice Governor of Basilan
- In office June 30, 2016 – June 30, 2025
- Succeeded by: Hadjiman Hataman Salliman

Personal details
- Born: Yusop Tanduh Alano; June 9, 1976 (age 50) Basilan, Philippines
- Party: PFP (since 2024)
- Other political affiliations: PDP–Laban (2018–2024); NPC (2015–2018)

Yusop Tanduh Alano (born June 9, 1976) is a Filipino politician who has served as the representative for Basilan's lone district since 2025. A member of the Partido Federal ng Pilipinas, he previously served as the vice governor of Basilan from 2016 to 2025.

== Vice Governor ==
=== First term ===
In the 2016 Philippine gubernatorial elections, he ran for Vice Governor under the Nationalist People's Coalition. He won with 77,709 votes, defeating three other candidates. In 2017, he gave out special medals for Basilan graduates. Alano attended the opening of the Agro-Industrial Trade Fair for the 44th founding anniversary of Basilan, stating that the fair "showcases not only the development but to include the potentials of the province."

=== Second term ===
In the 2019 Philippine gubernatorial elections, he ran for Vice Governor under Partido Demokratiko Pilipino. He won with 100,357 votes, beating two other candidates. A "School of Living Tradition" or Lumah Yakan was created on November 25, 2020, in Isabela, Basilan, as a project by Alano. He contributed to providing aid to Overseas Filipino Workers during the COVID-19 pandemic.

=== Third term ===
In the 2022 Philippine gubernatorial elections, he ran for his third and final term asVice Governor under Partido Demokratiko Pilipino. He won with 140,399 votes, 78.44 percent of the votes, beating three other candidates. On August 7, 2023, he joined the Taguima Youth Congress. In the congress, he had an address and a Q&A session. During his term, he supported a revenue code in the Bangsamoro Parliament to increase revenue-raising capacity.

== House of Representatives ==
In the 2025 Philippine House of Representatives elections, he ran for Basilan's lone district under the Partido Federal ng Pilipinas. He won with 119,696 votes, 37.93 percent of the votes, beating one other candidate by a margin of 10 percent.
