= Tobacco production in the Philippines =

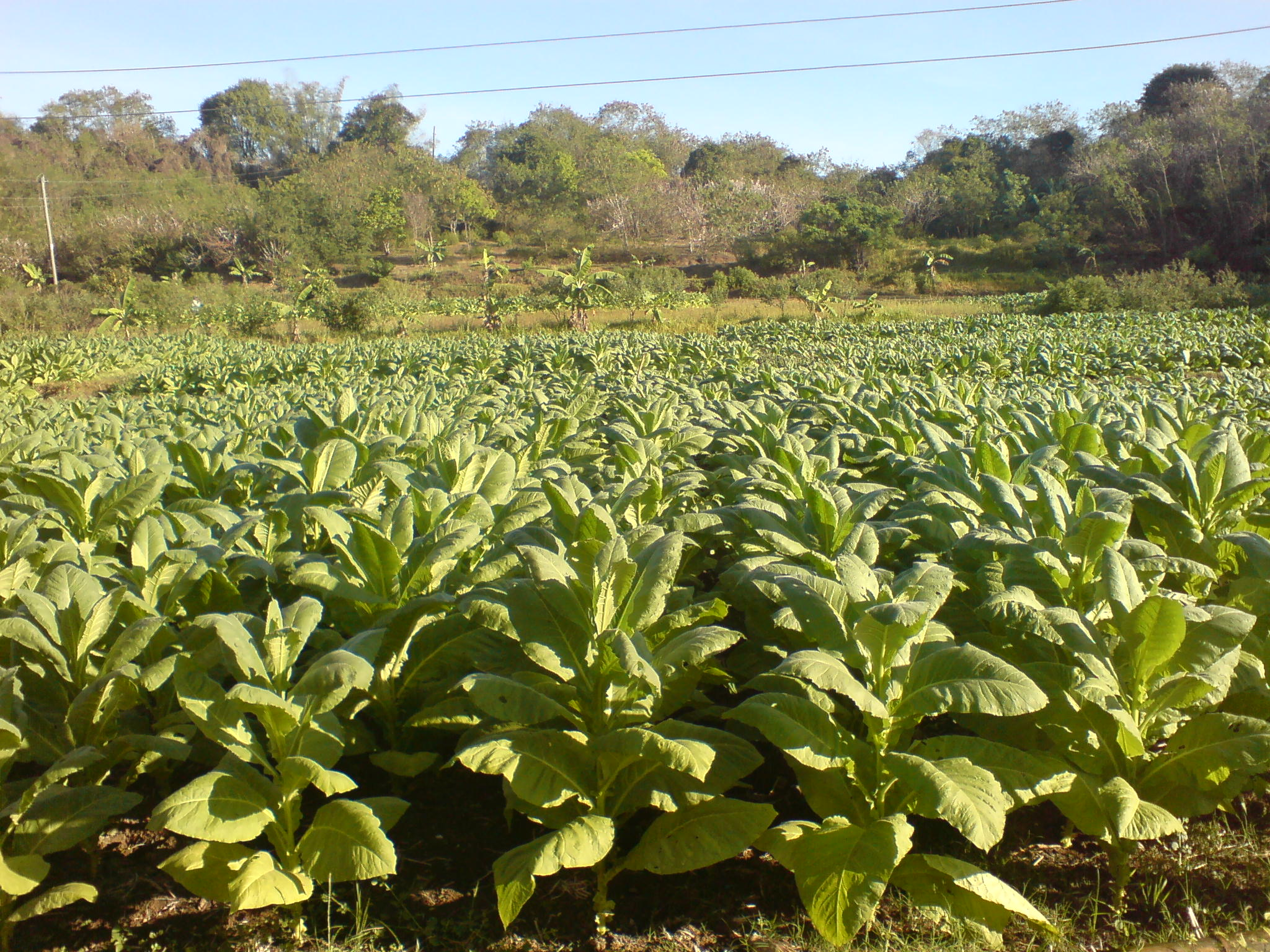
Field of tobacco in rural Philippines

First introduced in 1592, tobacco continues to dominate the social, political, and economic life in the Philippine regions where it is grown. The tobacco industry is a major force in the development of these areas, especially in Ilocos, in which it is still one of the region's leading sources of income.

== History ==
=== Introduction of tobacco to the archipelago ===
Tobacco came to the Philippines in 1592, when the Spanish Galleon San Clemente arrived in Manila carrying 50 kilos of Cuban tobacco seeds that were part of the Manila-Acapulco trade route. It is said that the first seeds were planted by Catholic Friars in Cagayan Valley. With a climate similar to the Vuelta Abajo region in Pinar del Rio, Cuba, the crop began to flourish and a new source of income was introduced to Spain.

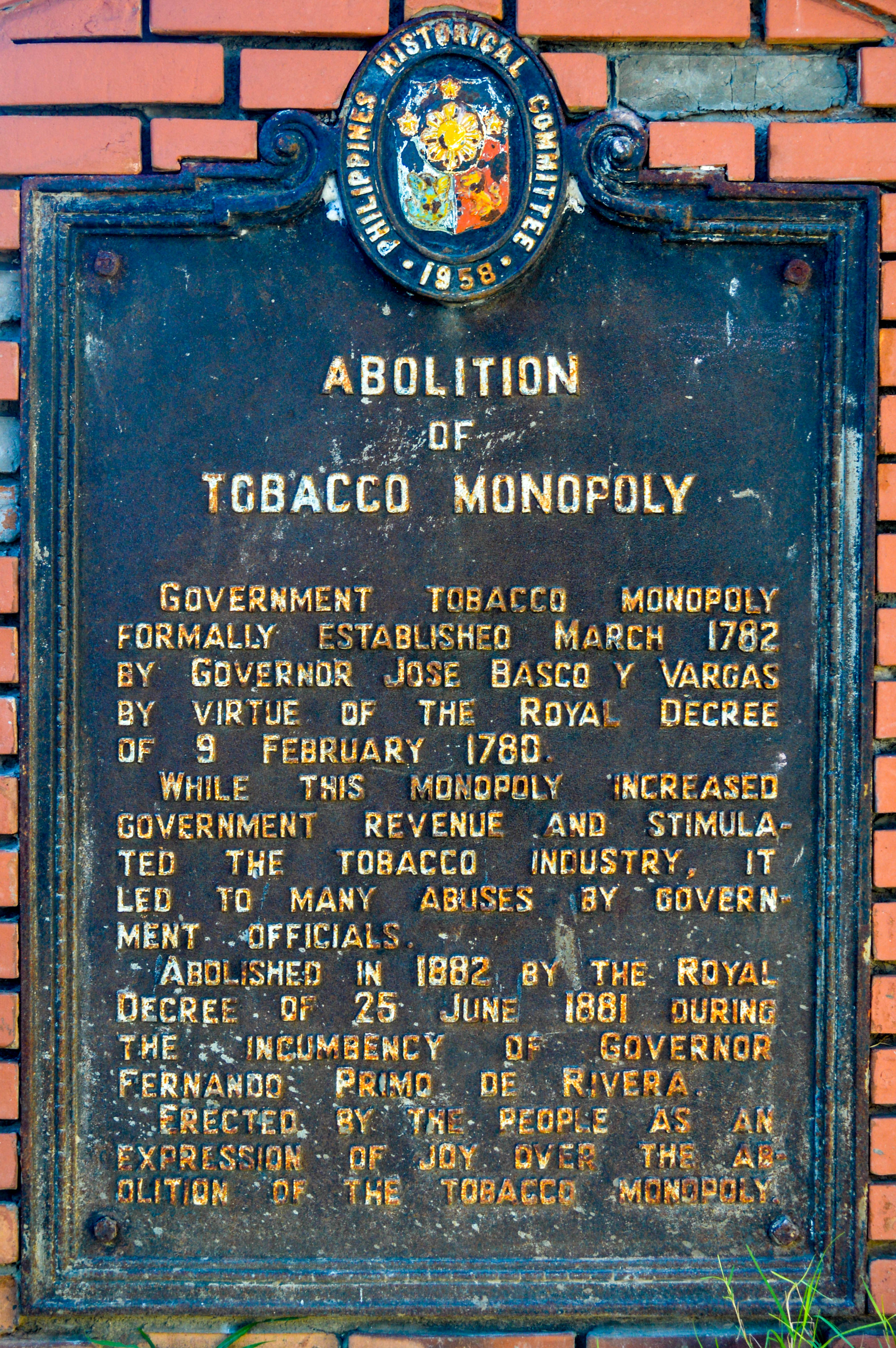
Historical Marker for the Abolition of Tobacco Monopoly Laoag City, Ilocos Norte

=== The Tobacco monopoly ===
In 1780, the tobacco monopoly was established, and the Filipinos, especially in the Ilocos and Cagayan Valley were forced to plant tobaccos and were given a specific quota to produce. Initially, tobacco farmers were treated fairly, but in the end, they abhorred tobacco because of the abuses committed by the Spaniards as they were forced to grow this crop. The monopoly did not only force the people, especially those from the north and Cagayan, to grow tobacco but compelled them to produce more than what their piece of land could yield.

In 1882, the tobacco monopoly was abolished, but the knowledge in growing the crop remained. Until its reintroduction in the early 1900s, tobacco is grown for home consumption and by those who learned to smoke. Later on, the tobacco industry again flourished and new types were introduced.

=== Postwar resurgence ===
The decade after the recognition of Philippine independence marked a return of the tobacco industry to economic prominence in the Ilocos region. After reading a feature article series by Maximo Soliven which explained why Virginia tobacco would grow well on Ilocos soil, businessman Harry Stonehill was convinced to invest extensively in rebuilding the industry, establishing the Philippine Tobacco Flue-Curing and Redrying Corporation (PTFCRC) in 1951 and recruiting farmers from throughout Region 1 to produce tobacco. The following year, La Union Congressman Manuel T. Cases filed a bill to "limit the importation of foreign leaf tobacco," which was eventually signed by President Elpidio Quirino as Republic Act 698. This allowed Stonehill's investments to make a handsome profit, and the newly-rebuilt local industry to bloom.

=== The Stonehill scandal ===
Stonehill was later deported a decade later, in 1962, for tax evasion and bribery of government officials, in what would later be called the Stonehill scandal, but the tobacco industry continued to grow.

== Types ==
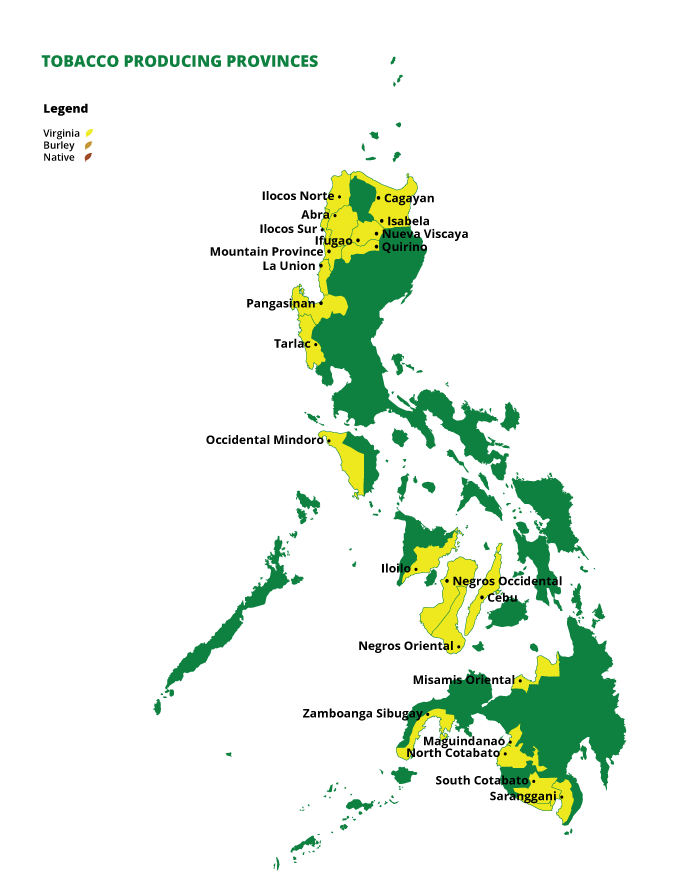
Tobacco-producing provinces in the Philippines

There are 3 types of tobacco that are locally grown in the Philippines:

Virginia tobacco is mostly grown in Region 1 (Ilocos Norte, Ilocos Sur, La Union) and CAR (Abra);

Burley tobacco is grown in Region 1 (La Union and Pangasinan), and CAR (Abra), Region 2 (Isabela and Cagayan), Region 3 (Tarlac), and Mimaropa (Occidental Mindoro); and

Native tobacco is grown in Region 1, Region 2 (Cagayan, Isabela, Quirino, and Nueva Vizcaya), the Visayan provinces of Cebu, Iloilo, Capiz, Leyte, and Negros Oriental, and the Mindanao provinces of Maguindanao, Zamboanga del Sur, Bukidnon, Misamis Ortiental, and North Cotabato.

Tobacco season varies depending on the type and region. In Luzon where Virginia is grown, the season starts around October until May. Burley and Native season starts around mid-November and until June (Burley) and July (Native). In the Visayas where Native is grown, the season starts from March to August/September. In Mindanao, Native tobacco season is from April/May until October/November. To cure the leaves, traditional tobacco farmers use either air-curing or fire-curing methods, while others use the flue-curing method.

== Volume of production and pricing ==
According to the National Tobacco Administration's 2024 report, the tobacco production for each type is as follows: Virginia with 16,790,525.46 Kg or 34.24% of the total volume, Native with 24,618,529.55 Kg or 50.20% of the total, and Burley with 7,632,964.19 Kg or 15.56% of the total volume.

In 2021, tobacco production had a decrease of 6% (46.28 million kilos), lower than the 2020 output which was at 49.17 million kilos. A total of 26, 628 hectares were planted with tobacco during these crop years, mostly in seven major tobacco-producing provinces.

Tobacco pricing varies per leaf. The NTA mandates the floor prices according to leaf grades:

- Virginia- AA (high), A, B, C, D, E, F-1, F-2, or R (reject)
- Burley- A, B, C, E, FF, and R
- Native- High Grade, Medium 1, Medium 2, Low 1, and Low 2.

Minimum Floor Prices Of Each Type Of Tobacco (2020–2021)
Grade	Virginia	Grade	Burley	Grade	Native
AA	84.10	A	72.10	HIGH	73.10
A	83.10	B	68.10	M-1	62.10
B	82.10	C	60.10	M-2	52.10
C	80.10	D	49.10	L-1	42.10
D	72.10	E	48.10	L-2	30.10
E	71.10	FF	40.10		
F-1	62.10	R	30.10		
F-2	59.10				
R	48.10				

== See also ==
- Types of tobacco
- Curing of tobacco
- History of tobacco
- Smoking in the Philippines
- Economy of the Philippines
