= Wahab Akbar =

Filipino politician (1960–2007)

The Honourable Wahab Akbar
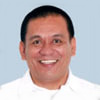
- Official portrait, 2007

Member of the House of Representatives from Basilan's at-large district
- In office June 30, 2007 – November 13, 2007
- Preceded by: Abdulgani A. Salapuddin
- Succeeded by: Vacant (Position next held by Hadjiman S. Hataman-Salliman)

Governor of Basilan
- In office June 30, 1998 – June 30, 2007
- Vice Governor: Bonnie Balamo (1998–2001); Lukman Ampao (2001–2004); Al-Rasheed Ahmad Sakkalahul (2004–2007)
- Preceded by: Abdulgani A. Salapuddin
- Succeeded by: Jum Jainudin Akbar

Personal details
- Born: April 16, 1960 Lantawan, Basilan, Philippines
- Died: November 13, 2007 (aged 47) Quezon City, Philippines
- Cause of death: Assassination
- Party: Liberal (2006–2007)
- Other political affiliations: Lakas (until 2006)
- Spouse(s): Jum Jainudin Akbar (first wife); Cherrylyn Akbar (second wife); Nur-in Akbar (third wife); Marietta Zamoranos (fourth wife); Unidentified Syrian woman (fifth wife)
- Education: De La Salle Araneta University
- Occupation: Politician

Ustadz Wahab M. Akbar (April 16, 1960 – November 13, 2007) was a Filipino politician who served three terms as governor of Basilan, during which time he was known for his "eye for an eye, tooth for a tooth" policy for dealing with kidnappers and terrorists in the province. He was later elected as congressman for the lone district of Basilan in the House of Representatives, but was one of 4 people killed in a bomb attack at the Batasang Pambansa. Police publicly suspected the attack was directed at him by political opponents.

== Life ==
Wahab Akbar was born in Lantawan, Basilan where his father, Hadji Mohtamad Salajin, served as the town's first mayor. At age 11 Akbar joined his father to fight in the mountains, but after three years Salajin was persuaded to join the government and was appointed mayor of Lantawan by President Ferdinand Marcos.

He studied agriculture at Gregorio Araneta University (now De La Salle Araneta University), but did not finish. A member of the Liberal Party, Akbar was first elected governor of Basilan in the 1998 elections. He was reelected in 2001 and 2004.

Akbar was constitutionally barred from seeking a fourth consecutive term as governor. Instead, he successfully sought election to the Congress, representing the lone district of his home province. One of his wives won the election to succeed him as governor. Another of his wives is mayor of the provincial capital, Isabela City; A third wife ran, and lost, the race to be mayor of another city in Basilan.

He was strongly suspected of having ties with the Abu Sayyaf, an Islamic extremist group linked to Al Qaeda, with some reports even claiming that he was a founding member and a commander until a falling-out with the group.

== Personal life ==
He was married to first wife Jum Jainnudin, second wife Cherry Lyn Santos, third wife Nur-in Akbar, fourth wife Marietta Zamoranos, and fifth wife who is a Syrian.

== Death ==
On November 13, 2007, Akbar died at the Far Eastern University - Nicanor Reyes Medical Foundation Medical Center from injuries sustained following an explosion at the House of Representatives in the Batasang Pambansa complex. The blast also immediately killed the driver of another legislator. Three other congressional staff members would die from blast injuries, including one of Akbar's own aides.

According to National Capital Region Police Office chief, Director Geary Barias, Akbar could have been the target of the bombing, since his vehicle bore the brunt of the damage.

The next day, his body was brought to Basilan via Zamboanga City. His body was brought to the respective houses of his first two wives before being buried in front of his mansion in Barangay Sumagdang, Isabela which was then under construction.

== Writ of Habeas Corpus ==
On December 14, 2007, in two-page resolution, the Supreme Court of the Philippines issued a writ of habeas corpus on petition of suspects Caidar Aunal, Adham Kusain, and Ikram Indama. It required the Philippine National Police's (PNP) Criminal Investigation and Detection Group (CIDG), National Capital Region-Criminal Investigation and Detection Unit (NCR-CIDU) and the PNP Custodial Center to file returns before Quezon City Regional Trial Court Executive Judge Romeo Zamora on December 18. However, the family suspected that the head of the killing was close ally of Senator and future President Benigno Aquino III and Anak Mindanao Representative Mujiv Hataman.

== See also ==
- List of Philippine legislators who died in office
