= Lantawan =

Municipality in Basilan, Philippines

Lantawan لنتاون
- Municipality
- Municipality of Lantawan
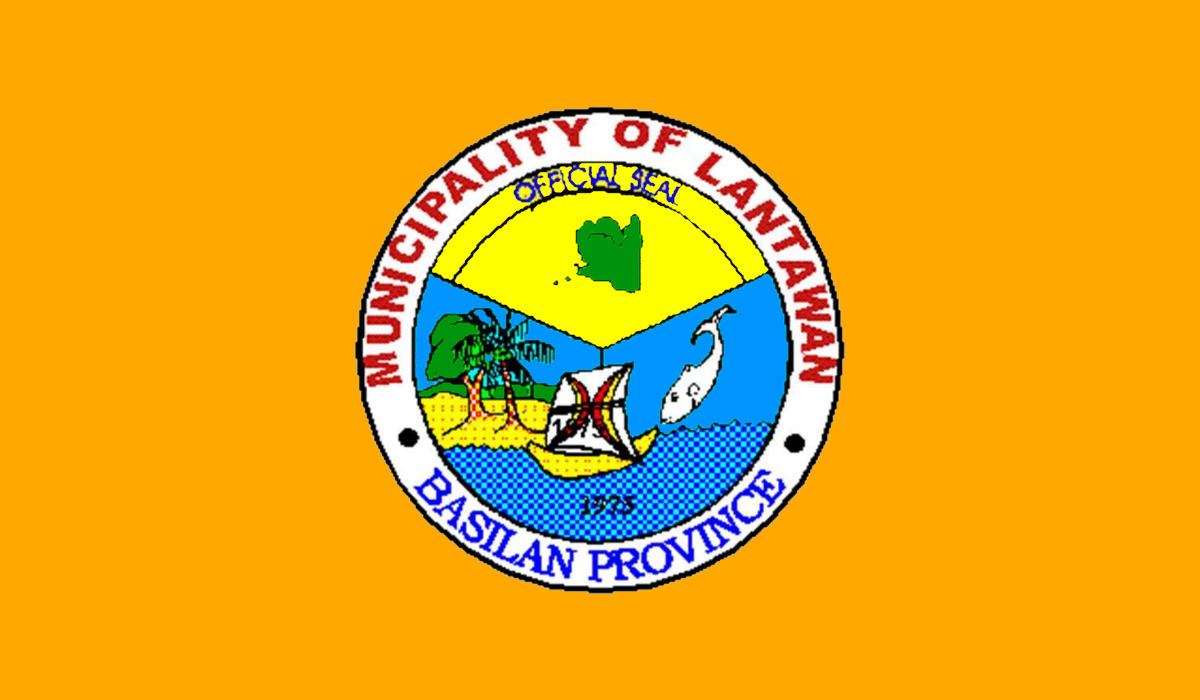
- Flag Seal

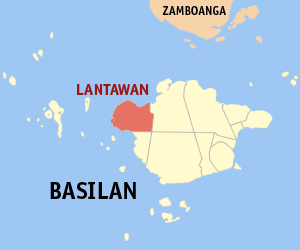
- Map of Basilan with Lantawan highlighted
- Interactive map of Lantawan
- Location within the Philippines
- Coordinates: 6°38′17″N 121°50′24″E
- Country: Philippines
- Region: Bangsamoro Autonomous Region in Muslim Mindanao
- Province: Basilan
- House district: Lone district
- Parliamentary district: 4th district
- Barangays: 25 (see Barangays)

Government
  - Type: Sangguniang Bayan
  - Mayor: Nursiya I. Ismael
  - Vice Mayor: Rustam M. Ismael
  - House Representative: Yusop T. Alano
  - Municipal Council: Members: Basrin K. Nasirin; Jermad T. Mustamad; Sahi L. Jainal; Kasey Lean A. Suela; Patta S. Lazaro; Jaymar M. Ansaluddin; Hayra I. Osalli; Alghamdi I. Sansawi
  - Electorate: 20,224 voters (2025)

Area
  - Total: 405.04 km^{2} (156.39 sq mi)
- Elevation: 30 m (98 ft)
- Highest elevation: 703 m (2,306 ft)
- Lowest elevation: 0 m (0 ft)

Population (2024 census)
  - Total: 48,777
  - Density: 120.43/km^{2} (311.90/sq mi)
  - Households: 5,758

Economy
  - Income class: 2nd municipal income class
  - Poverty incidence: 43.76% (2023)
  - Revenue: ₱ 183.3 million (2024)
  - Assets: ₱ 256.2 million (2024)
  - Expenditure: ₱ 154.6 million (2024)
  - Liabilities: ₱ 152 million (2024)

Service provider
  - Electricity: Basilan Electric Cooperative (BASELCO)
- Time zone: UTC+8 (PST)
- ZIP code: 7301
- PSGC: 1900703000
- IDD : area code: +63 (0)62
- Native languages: Chavacano; Yakan; Tagalog
- Website: www.lantawan.gov.ph

Lantawan, officially the Municipality of Lantawan (Tausūg: Lupah Lantawan; Chavacano: Municipalidad de Lantawan; Tagalog: Bayan ng Lantawan), is a municipality in the province of Basilan, Philippines. According to the 2024 census, it has a population of 48,777 people.

On August 25, 2007, 10 of its barangays were separated and constituted into the new municipality of Hadji Muhtamad. The municipality now only consists of 25 barangays found on Basilan Island.

== Geography ==
=== Barangays ===
Lantawan is politically subdivided into 25 barangays. Each barangay consists of puroks while some have sitios.

PSGC	Barangay	Population			±% p.a.	
		2024		2010		
150703001	Atong-atong	4.9%	2,368	1,155	▴	5.11%
150703018	Bagbagon	1.7%	829	793	▴	0.31%
150703003	Baungis	1.1%	524	515	▴	0.12%
150703019	Bulan-bulan	3.0%	1,463	1,333	▴	0.65%
150703004	Bulanza	1.6%	771	605	▴	1.70%
150703037	Calayan	1.0%	507	452	▴	0.80%
150703026	Calugusan	1.8%	870	796	▴	0.62%
150703027	Canibungan	3.8%	1,847	1,472	▴	1.59%
150703029	Landugan	0.9%	452	390	▴	1.03%
150703007	Lantawan Proper (Poblacion)	1.9%	919	943	▾	−0.18%
150703031	Lawi-lawi	2.0%	994	681	▴	2.66%
150703030	Lawila	1.3%	643	467	▴	2.25%
150703024	Lower Bañas	1.2%	599	550	▴	0.59%
150703008	Lower Manggas	2.1%	1,025	598	▴	3.81%
150703036	Luuk-Maluha	1.0%	498	491	▴	0.10%
150703011	Matarling	1.9%	929	1,337	▾	−2.50%
150703012	Matikang	1.9%	918	857	▴	0.48%
150703033	Pamucalin	2.5%	1,228	1,143	▴	0.50%
150703035	Paniongan	1.3%	612	524	▴	1.08%
150703038	Parian-Baunoh	2.1%	1,001	843	▴	1.20%
150703021	Suba-an (Pangasahan)	1.8%	895	516	▴	3.90%
150703034	Switch Yakal	2.2%	1,056	944	▴	0.78%
150703016	Tairan	4.3%	2,104	1,562	▴	2.09%
150703025	Upper Bañas	1.2%	571	466	▴	1.42%
150703017	Upper Manggas	2.0%	971	654	▴	2.78%
	Total		48,777	20,087	▴	6.36%

=== Climate ===
Climate data for Lantawan, Basilan
Month	Jan	Feb	Mar	Apr	May	Jun	Jul	Aug	Sep	Oct	Nov	Dec	Year
Mean daily maximum °C (°F)	27 (81)	27 (81)	27 (81)	28 (82)	28 (82)	28 (82)	28 (82)	28 (82)	28 (82)	28 (82)	28 (82)	28 (82)	28 (82)
Mean daily minimum °C (°F)	26 (79)	26 (79)	27 (81)	27 (81)	28 (82)	27 (81)	27 (81)	27 (81)	27 (81)	27 (81)	27 (81)	27 (81)	27 (81)
Average precipitation mm (inches)	104 (4.1)	71 (2.8)	87 (3.4)	96 (3.8)	206 (8.1)	262 (10.3)	272 (10.7)	264 (10.4)	181 (7.1)	240 (9.4)	192 (7.6)	109 (4.3)	2,084 (82)
Average rainy days	14.3	12.8	14.3	14.2	21.8	23.3	24.1	24.0	19.7	21.8	19.4	15.4	225.1
Source: Meteoblue (modeled/calculated data, not measured locally)

== Demographics ==
Population census of Lantawan

Year	Pop.	±% p.a.
1960	27,493	—
1970	8,528	−11.03%
1975	14,081	+10.58%
1980	17,733	+4.72%
1990	19,364	+0.88%
1995	25,613	+5.38%

Year	Pop.	±% p.a.
2000	27,487	+1.53%
2007	28,978	+0.73%
2010	20,087	−12.49%
2015	24,594	+3.93%
2020	31,040	+5.02%
2024	48,777	+11.46%

Source: Philippine Statistics Authority

In the 2024 census, Lantawan had a population of 48,777. According to Ethnologue and Joshua Project, Lantawan had a multi-ethnic population which mainly use Chavacano as the lingua-franca.

== Economy ==
Poverty Incidence of Lantawan

Source: Philippine Statistics Authority

== Notable personalities ==
- Isnilon Totoni Hapilon, self-proclaimed emir of the Islamic State forces in the Philippines and former leader of the Abu Sayyaf Group
