= Jum Jainudin Akbar =

Governor of Basilan

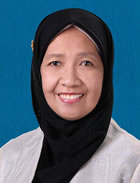

Member of the Philippine House of Representatives from Basilan's at-large congressional district
- In office June 30, 2016 – November 11, 2016
- Preceded by: Hadjiman Hataman Salliman
- Succeeded by: Mujiv Hataman

Governor of Basilan
- In office June 30, 2007 – June 30, 2016
- Vice Governor: Al-Rasheed Ahmad Sakkalahul (2007–2013); Keemhar Jay Sakkalahul (2013–2016)
- Preceded by: Wahab Akbar
- Succeeded by: Hadjiman Hataman Salliman

Personal details
- Born: September 3, 1963 Isabela, Basilan, Philippines
- Died: November 11, 2016 (aged 53) Taguig, Metro Manila, Philippines
- Cause of death: Cardiac arrest
- Resting place: Isabela City, Basilan, Philippines
- Party: Liberal (2007–2009; 2010–2016)
- Other political affiliations: Lakas (2009–2010)
- Spouse: Wahab Akbar

Jum Jainudin Akbar (September 3, 1963 – November 11, 2016) was a Filipina politician who served two terms as provincial governor of Basilan. She was the widow of assassinated Congressman Wahab Akbar. Akbar, along with other Mindanao governors, had a hand in supporting the Bangsamoro Basic Law.

== Political career ==
Akbar was the first female governor of the Province of Basilan, and was elected during the May 2007 elections. She pledged a campaign promise of providing free rubber trees, fertilizers and polybags to farmers of the region.

In her first term as governor, an IED went off near her home. The explosion was thought by authorities to be linked to politics.

Akbar handled the evacuation and retrieval operations at Al Barka after the July 2007 massacre of Philippine Army troops in a rebel ambush during her tenure.

== Death ==
She died in office on 11 November 2016. She is survived by her son, Al-Qauid.
