= 2007 Batasang Pambansa bombing =

Bombing incident in Quezon City, Philippines

Coordinates: 14.6925°N 121.0947°E

- Quezon City (Philippines)
- Location: Batasang Pambansa Complex, Quezon City, Philippines
- Date: November 13, 2007; 8:15 p.m. – (Philippine Standard Time)
- Target: Representative Wahab Akbar
- Attack type: Motorcycle bomb
- Deaths: 6 (including Wahab Akbar)
- Injuries: 12 (including Luzviminda Ilagan and Pryde Henry Teves)
- Perpetrator: Ikram Indama

The 2007 Batasang Pambansa bombing occurred on the night of November 13, 2007, at the Batasang Pambansa Complex in Quezon City, Philippines—the seat of the country's House of Representatives. As Representatives Wahab Akbar (Basilan lone), Luzviminda Ilagan (Gabriela), and Pryde Henry Teves (Negros Oriental 3rd) were exiting the south wing of the building after a session, explosives in a nearby parked motorcycle were detonated. Akbar and a staffer of Ilagan were killed in the blast. Ilagan and Teves were injured, while four injured staffers later succumbed to their injuries.

In a follow-up police operation, three suspects were killed while another three, including Ikram Indama, were arrested. The suspects were allegedly members of Abu Sayyaf, a jihadist separatist group based in Basilan and Sulu. Akbar was apparently the target of the attack, and Akbar's political rivals, Gerry Salapuddin and Mujiv Hataman, were named as masterminds but were later cleared by the courts. In 2017, Ikram Indama was convicted of multiple murders for the attack and was sentenced to life imprisonment without the possibility of parole, while the two other suspects were acquitted. Three other suspects remain at large.

== Explosion ==
The blast occurred at 8:15 p.m. at the south wing of the building while lawmakers were leaving after a legislative session. Witnesses reported that "the ground shook and parts of the ceiling collapsed and chunks of the façade were dislodged." Marcial Taldo, the driver of Gabriela party-list Representative Luzviminda Ilagan, died on the spot in Ilagan's car. Basilan Representative Wahab Akbar, the apparent target of the blast, was rushed to the Far Eastern University Hospital in Quezon City, where he was later declared dead. Police believed the explosive device was planted in a nearby motorcycle.

Four other people were killed or later died from their injuries, and 12 were injured, including Representative Luzviminda Ilagan and Congressman Pryde Henry Teves of Negros Oriental. Both of Congressman Teves' eardrums were severely damaged, apparently disabling his hearing. An earlier report stated that his leg would require amputation, but this was later revoked upon the doctor's decision that medical intervention short of amputation could be implemented to rehabilitate the wounded legislator's leg.

Immediately after the blast, lawmakers were not allowed to leave the building.

== Casualties ==
=== Fatalities ===
- Congressman Wahab Akbar, Representative of the lone district of Basilan
- Junaskiri Hayudini, an aide of Representative Akbar
- Marcial Taldo, a staff member of Congresswoman Luzviminda Ilagan of the GABRIELA party-list
- Maan Gale Bustaliño, Chief of Staff of Representative Pryde Henry Teves
- Dennis Manila, aide of Representative Teves
- Vercita Garcia, a staff member of Teves, died of cardiac arrest at St. Luke's Medical Center in Quezon City on December 17, 2007

=== Injuries ===
- Congressman Pryde Henry Teves, legislator for the 3rd district of Negros Oriental. On December 18, 2007, Teves was moved out of the intensive care unit of St. Luke's Medical Center in Quezon City to a private room and recuperated from a fractured leg and sustained deep burns in his arms from the bombing. On January 31, 2008, Teves reported for work at the House of Representatives, against doctors' advice. Teves, still in a wheelchair, wore black cotton gloves to protect his burned hands, and could not shake hands or use his cellular phone.
- Congresswoman Luzviminda Ilagan, legislator for the GABRIELA Women's Party party-list.

== Investigation and trial ==
Philippine National Police (PNP) Director General Avelino Razon was ordered by President Gloria Macapagal Arroyo to personally supervise the investigation of the explosion.

The PNP subsequently raided a house not far from the Congress Building, killing three suspected members of the terrorist group Abu Sayyaf. This led to the PNP confiscating a dozen stickers bearing the logo of the Philippine Congress, a car plate with the number 8 (used by congressmen), an identification card from the House of Representatives, and the plate number suspected to have been removed from the motorcycle used to hide the bomb.

The police arrested three suspects: Caidar Aunal, Adham Kusain, and Ikram Indama. Subsequent police interrogation disclosed "damning evidence" against Akbar's political rivals, former Deputy House Speaker Gerry Salapuddin, and Anak Mindanao Party-List Representative Mujiv Hataman, citing the trail of events and mechanisms involved in the planning of the attack. As such, police said charges would be filed by government prosecutors against them. The two political figures appeared beforehand at the National Police headquarters to clear their names of involvement in the attack. Subsequent action by government prosecutors made Salapuddin and Hataman, together with the latter's brother, Benjamin "Jim" Hataman, suspects and masterminds in the bombing.

On December 14, 2007, in a 2-page resolution, the Supreme Court of the Philippines issued a writ of habeas corpus on the petition of suspects Caidar Aunal, Adham Kusain, and Ikram Indama. It required the PNP's Criminal Investigation and Detection Group (CIDG), National Capital Region-Criminal Investigation and Detection Unit (NCR-CIDU), and the PNP Custodial Center to file returns before Quezon City Regional Trial Court Executive Judge Romeo Zamora on December 18.

On December 20, 2007, the criminal case Q-07-149982 filed against accused Aunal, Kusain, and Indama was raffled to Regional Trial Court Branch 83 Judge Ralph Lee after Branch 80 Judge Charito Gonzales recused herself. On January 29, 2008, Judge Lee granted the three accused's motion for preliminary investigation, ordered the DOJ to issue a resolution within 20 days, and set the arraignment for February 26. The Judge also directed the Criminal Investigation and Detection Group (CIDG) to transfer all accused to the Quezon City Jail. On April 28, 2008, Judge Lee issued the warrant and ordered the arrest of former Basilan Representative Gerry Salapuddin, Police Officer 1 Bayan Judda, Jaharun Jamiri, and Benjamin Hataman, all indicted on multiple murder and multiple frustrated murder charges before the court.

Jamiri Hajirun, former mayor of Tuburan, Basilan, was indicted for violation of Section 2 of Republic Act 8294 (Illegal Possession of Explosives) before the Manila RTC on May 15, 2008. A bail of P200,000 was recommended for his release. The PNP claimed he had direct knowledge related to the bombing.

On November 17, 2017, Indama was convicted of multiple murders and sentenced to life imprisonment without the possibility of parole. Meanwhile, Kusain and Aunal were acquitted. Three other suspects remain at large: Jamiri, Judda, and Benjamin Hataman.

== See also ==
- List of attacks on legislatures
