= Basilan =

Province in Bangsamoro, Philippines

- Province
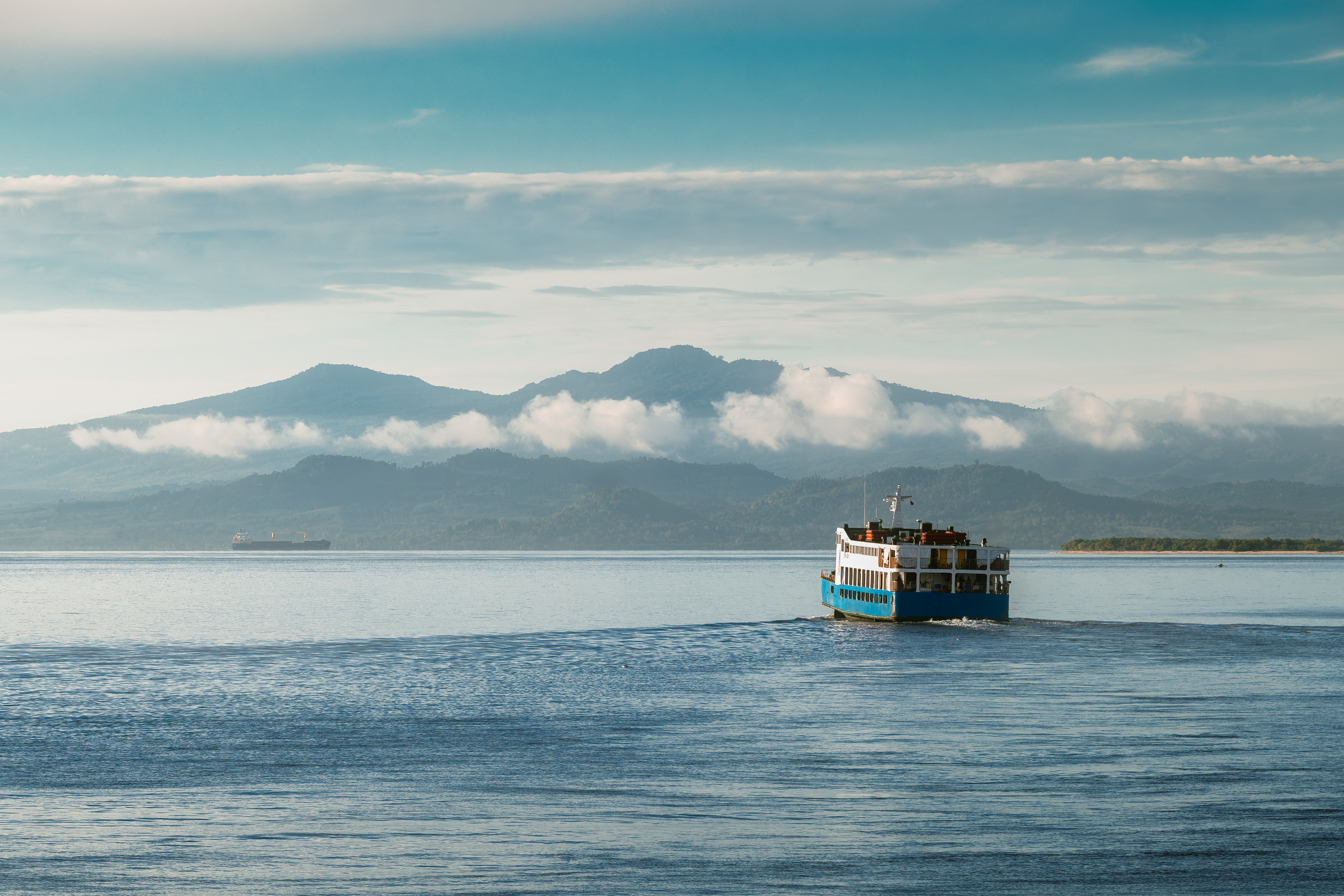
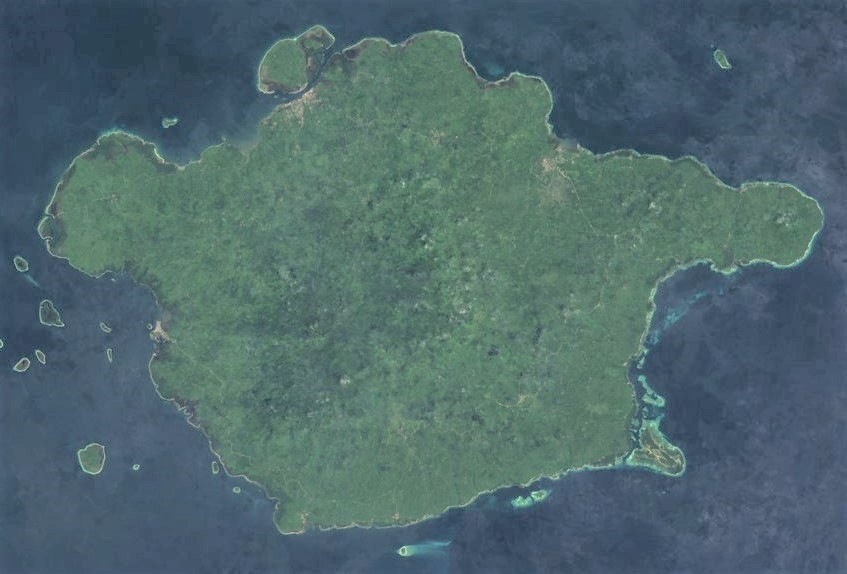
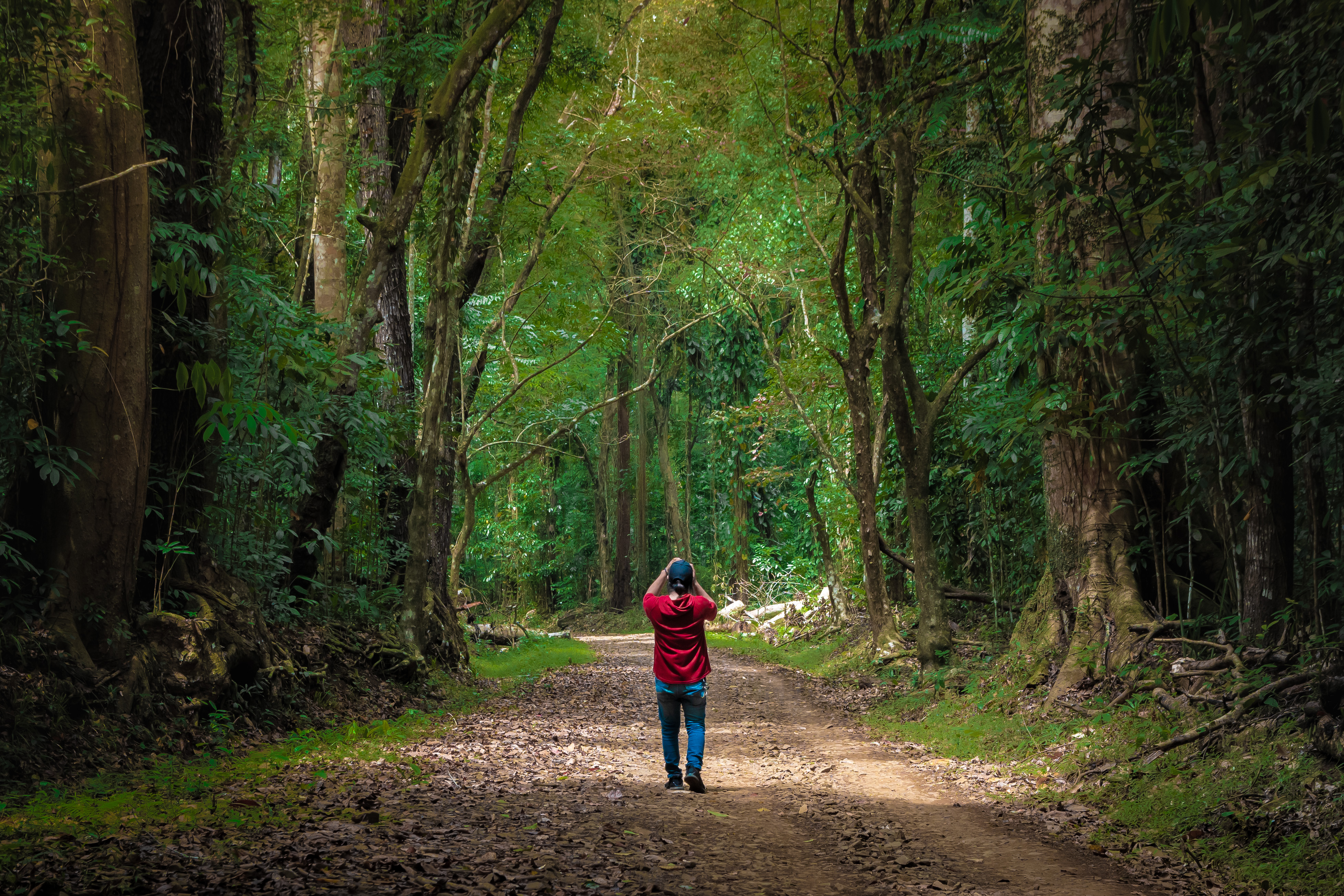
- (from top: left to right) Basilan Peak, Forest Park in Isabela City, Lamitan City Hall and Basilan satellite image in 2016

- Flag Seal

- Location in the Philippines
- Interactive map of Basilan
- Coordinates: 7°N 122°E
- Country: Philippines
- Region: Bangsamoro (except Isabela City)
- Chartered City: July 1, 1948
- Converted into a province: December 27, 1973
- Capital: Lamitan
- Largest city: Isabela

Government
  - Type: Sangguniang Panlalawigan
  - Governor: Mujiv S. Hataman (BUP)
  - Vice Governor: Hadjiman S. Hataman-Salliman (PFP)
  - Representative: Yusop T. Alano (PFP)
  - Legislature: Basilan Provincial Board
  - Electorate: 315,601 voters (2025)

Area
  - Total: 1,327.23 km^{2} (512.45 sq mi)
  - Rank: 72nd out of 82
- Highest elevation (Basilan Peak): 998 m (3,274 ft)

Population (2024 census)
  - Total: 541,947
  - Rank: 56th out of 82
  - Density: 408.329/km^{2} (1,057.57/sq mi)
  - Households: 73,419
- Demonyms: Basileño; Basileña; Basilanin; Basilanon; Tau Basilan

Divisions
  - Independent cities: 0
  - Component cities: 2: Isabela; Lamitan
  - Municipalities: 11: Akbar; Al-Barka; Hadji Mohammad Ajul; Hadji Muhtamad; Lantawan; Maluso; Sumisip; Tabuan-Lasa; Tipo-Tipo, Basilan; Tuburan; Ungkaya Pukan
  - Districts: Legislative district of Basilan

Economy
  - Income class: 1st provincial income class
  - Poverty incidence: 33.7% (2023)
  - Revenue: ₱ 1,629 million (2024)
  - Assets: ₱ 2,656 million (2024)
  - Expenditure: ₱ 1,583 million (2024)
  - Liabilities: ₱ 1,150 million (2024)
- Time zone: UTC+8 (PST)
- PSGC: 150700000
- IDD : area code: +63 (0)62
- ISO 3166 code: PH-BAS
- Spoken languages: Chavacano; Yakan; Tausug; Sama; Cebuano; English; Filipino
- Website: www.basilan.gov.ph

Basilan, officially the Province of Basilan, (Note: Spanish and Chavacano: Provincia de Basilan; Yakan: Wilayah Basilanin; Tausug: Wilaya' sin Basilan; Filipino: Lalawigan ng Basilan) is an island province of the Philippines located primarily in the Bangsamoro Autonomous Region. Basilan Island is the largest and northernmost of the major islands of the Sulu Archipelago. It is just off the southern coast of the geographic Zamboanga Peninsula.

Its capital is Lamitan. Isabela is the most populous city in the province, but is administered as part of the Zamboanga Peninsula region (Region IX) rather than the Bangsamoro Autonomous Region in Muslim Mindanao (BARMM). Because of this regional separation, the Philippine Statistics Authority excludes Isabela's census figures from Basilan's provincial total, and the provincial government considers the city outside its jurisdiction.

Basilan is home to three main ethnolinguistic groups: the indigenous Yakans, and the later-arriving Tausugs and Chavacanos. The Yakans and Tausugs are predominantly Muslim, while the Chavacano are mainly Christian. There are also a number of smaller ethnic groups. Although the official languages are Filipino and English, the main native language is Yakan and lingua franca is Chavacano. Other languages include Tausug, Cebuano, and Sama.

Basilan, although classified as a 3rd-class province in terms of gross provincial income, has one of the lowest incidences of poverty in the Philippines (26.19% of the general population), ranked 20 among the Philippines' 80 provinces. (In comparison, Maguindanao which was ranked last at number 80 has a poverty incidence of 44.24%.) The gap between Basilan's rich and poor residents are among the narrowest in the country (ranked 3rd nationwide), pointing to one of the most equitable distributions of wealth anywhere in the country (Gini coefficient 0.2826, which is slightly better than the provinces of Pampanga, Bulacan, Nueva Ecija, Tarlac, Cavite, Batanes, and Batangas).

== Etymology ==
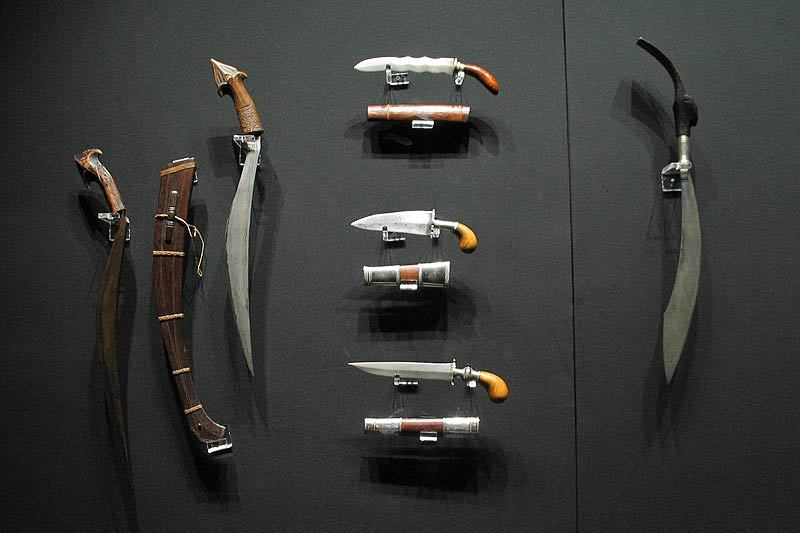
Examples of finely crafted Moro blades made from Basilan "basih" (iron).

In 1521, Antonio Pigafetta of the Magellan expedition, records the name of Basilan as Taghima, variously spelled in early European maps as Tanguima, Taglima, Tagimar, Tagema, and Tagyto. The first record of the island's name as Basilan is by a Jesuit historian, Fr. Colin.

Oral traditions of the local Yakan include several names for pre-historic Basilan: Uleyan, which is derived from the present-named Basilan Peak (Puno Mahaji), and later changed to Matangal after a mountain farther to the east of the island. These names were presumably used by the Maguindanao traders from mainland Mindanao, as these mountains were navigational landmarks when sailing the Celebes Sea.

Other names romantically given were Puh Gulangan ("island of forests"); Umus Tambun ("fertile land"); and Kumalarang, after the westward-flowing river in the island's western half otherwise called Baunuh Peggesan.

== History ==
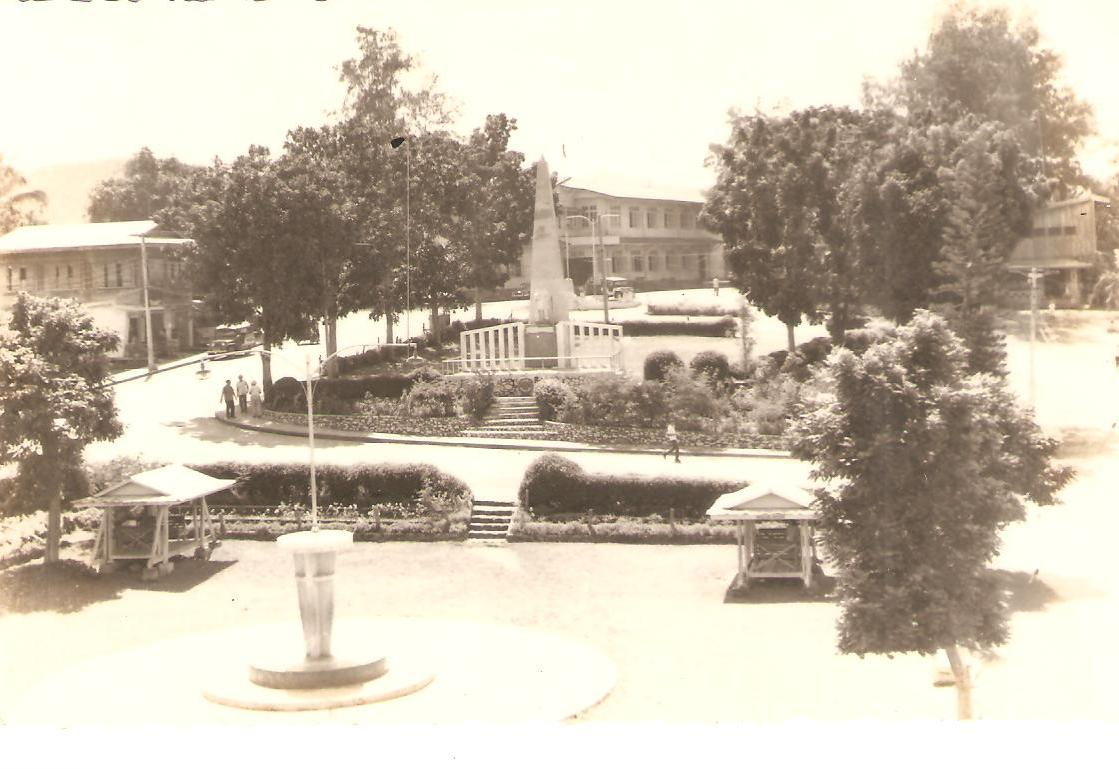
Old Plaza Rizal and Plaza Misericordia, opposite Santa Isabel Cathedral, old City Hall (Provincial Capitol) atop the hill in the background.

=== Pre-colonial Basilan ===
According to royal genealogical records, colonial accounts, and modern historical research, Basilan, historically known as Taguima, emerged as an important regional trade center in the precolonial period, linking the Sulu Archipelago, Borneo, and broader Insular Southeast Asian maritime networks.

Datu Taguima's authority reflected the island's political and commercial significance in early regional affairs.

The island's inhabitants, known as the Tagimaha, formed a coastal and inland farming community engaged in trade, seafaring, agriculture, and regional diplomacy. They established Taguima as a center of economic activity, cultural exchange, and early political organization within the Sulu Archipelago.

=== Champa Kingdom period ===
By the 7th to 8th centuries, Champa (Orang Dampuan) traders from Mainland Southeast Asia maintained sustained commercial and social contact with Taguima (Basilan) through regional maritime trade networks. These Cham merchants established trading ties, settlements, and intermarried with local Tagimaha communities, contributing advanced maritime knowledge, boat-building techniques, textile production methods, decorative weaving styles, and social organizational practices. This long-term interaction shaped Tagimaha society into a culturally hybrid community that combined indigenous Basilan traditions with Champa-derived maritime, artistic, and commercial influences, strengthening Basilan's role as a center of regional trade and cultural exchange in the Sulu Archipelago.

By the 9th century, the Champa King Indravarman II (r. 854–893 CE) formalized political and commercial ties with Taguima (Basilan), which had already emerged as a strategic maritime partner in the Sulu Sea region. This policy consolidated preferential trade arrangements and strengthened relations between the Champa court and Taguima's local leadership. Stele M.14 at Đồng Dương records Champa court initiatives to secure access to valuable pearl and aromatic commodities sourced from the Sulu Sea, indicating the strategic importance of Taguima within Champa's external trade networks. According to Po Dharma and Pierre-Yves Manguin, this relationship reflected a mandala-style political economy in which Taguima functioned as a primary collection hub for maritime resources such as pearls and hardwoods, while Champa supplied state-produced goods including textiles and metallurgical products.

Between the 9th and 12th centuries, a violent conflict erupted in Sulu between the Buranun (the original inhabitants of Sulu) and Champa (Orang Dampuan) merchants over trade dominance and economic power. According to historical accounts and Sulu oral traditions, many Orang Dampuan traders were killed in a massacre linked to rising tensions over wealth, commerce, and political influence. Survivors fled the Sulu mainland, with a significant group seeking refuge in Taguima (Basilan), where they settled among local Tagimaha communities. This migration created a second wave of Cham-linked settlement in Basilan, reinforcing existing trade networks, cultural exchange, and demographic ties between Champa-origin groups and indigenous Tagimaha society.

By the 10th to 13th centuries, Islamic influence in the Sulu Archipelago and Basilan expanded through Muslim merchants and missionaries, including scholars associated with Champa (Orang Dampuan). These missionaries reinforced earlier Islamic knowledge introduced through trade, teaching religious practices, legal traditions, and communal norms to coastal and inland communities in Taguima (Basilan). Some Tagimaha groups were among the earliest adopters of Islam in the southern Philippines, predating the formal establishment of the Sulu Sultanate.

In search of new trading opportunities and political influence, Tagimaha groups expanded beyond Taguima (Basilan) into Buansa (Jolo), where they encountered resistance from the indigenous Buranun, leading to conflict. As a result, some Tagimaha groups returned to Taguima (Basilan), while others remained in Buansa. Royal genealogical records in the Sulu tarsila describe the Tagimaha who stayed in Buansa as early leaders who helped establish local systems of governance that later shaped Sulu's political development.

=== Acehnese lineage to Bruneian alliance ===
Long before Europeans arrived, Taguima (Basilan) was a strategic hub of religion, trade, and maritime power, linking Sumatra and Borneo. From the 14th century, the Acehnese–Tagimaha lineage began shaping Taguima's identity.

The intermarriage of Acehnese jurists with local ruling houses ensured that the Sumatran interpretations of Islamic law and social organization (meunasah) became permanently embedded in the island's social structure.

— Anthony Reid, An Indonesian Frontier (2019), p. 114.

=== Bruneian strategic partnership ===
By the 16th century, the Brunei–Tagimaha alliance defined Taguima's northern seas.

The Tagimaha of Basilan were among the Sultan's most trusted naval allies, famously contributing twenty warboats and five-hundred warriors to the Bruneian fleet during its historical campaigns in the eastern seas.

— Robert Nicholl, European Sources for the History of the Sultanate of Brunei (1975), p. 24.

In Buansa (Jolo), Tagimaha leaders played an important role in supporting and facilitating three Muslim figures recorded in Sulu genealogical traditions. Karimul Makdum introduced Islam and began early religious teaching in the region, and is traditionally credited with the construction of one of the earliest mosques in Sulu. Tuan Masha'ikha strengthened Islamic influence among local elites. Raja Baguinda later arrived, initially encountering resistance, but eventually became a political leader in Buansa and married into a local ruling family linked in some traditions to Tagimaha lineage. These interactions contributed to the spread of Islam and early political development in Sulu before the establishment of the Sulu Sultanate.

The historical influence of the Tagimaha extended beyond Basilan and Buansa into the long-term political development of the Sulu region. Descendants of Tagimaha-linked elites continued to hold leadership roles in local governance, trade networks, and regional diplomacy. Sulu genealogical records and colonial-era accounts describe Tagimaha-affiliated families as part of the ruling and noble class that shaped political authority, economic activity, and inter-island relations. Over time, their legacy persisted through elite lineages, cultural influence, and continued participation in Sulu's political and social structures.

=== During the Sulu Sultanate ===
As the Sulu Sultanate consolidated power, regional trade became increasingly centered in Jolo, reducing Basilan’s earlier prominence as a maritime trading hub. Over time, Basilan’s economy placed greater emphasis on localized production, inland agriculture, and resource-based livelihoods, as reflected in later historical and anthropological accounts. This shift marked a transition in Basilan’s regional role from a major trade center to a more locally oriented economic landscape.

Historical accounts indicate that the authority of the Sulu Sultanate was largely concentrated in coastal and political centers, while inland communities in Basilan, including the Yakan, retained substantial local autonomy. Ethnographic studies suggest that Yakan communities were not tightly bound to the Sultanate’s administrative or political obligations, instead maintaining their own systems of communal governance, local leadership, and customary law.

During the period of the Sulu Sultanate, communities in Basilan historically associated with the Tagimaha continued to participate in regional trade, agriculture, and local leadership. While the Tagimaha are less frequently named in later written records, Sulu genealogical records and colonial accounts suggest that Basilan-linked families continued to hold influence by serving as local leaders, forming marriage ties with Sulu elites, and participating in regional trade, allowing their social status and identity to persist over time.

The Tagimaha appear to have followed two historical paths: some became integrated into elite lineages within Sulu Sultanate, while others are widely regarded as ancestral to, or historically linked with, the present-day Yakan.

Today, Yakan cultural traditions in Basilan show continuity with earlier Tagimaha and Cham (Orang Dampuan) influences, particularly in intricate weaving patterns, maritime knowledge, settlement patterns, and oral traditions linked to precolonial trade networks. These traditions reflect long-term cultural continuity shaped by both Cham foreign contact and native Basilan heritage. Later interactions with Acehnese religious scholars and Bruneian royal maritime alliances contributed Islamic institutions, elite symbols of rank, and naval culture, forming a composite Yakan culture shaped by Tagimaha, Cham, Sumatran, and Bornean strands.

=== Taguima ===
Documents from the royal archives of the Sulu Sultanate referred to the northernmost island of the Sulu Archipelago as Taguima. Later references mentioned "Bantilan", probably referring to Maluso, which was established as a major Tausug base by Sulu Sultan Muizz ud-Din, whose princely name was Datu Bantilan.

Imperial Chinese texts mention a "Kingdom of Kumalarang" (from the Yakan kumalang "to sing", owing to the location being a place for celebrations and gatherings) during the Ming Dynasty, believed to be the island which now has a barangay of the same name on its northwestern shores.

Basilan was seen and mentioned by the remnants of Ferdinand Magellan's expedition in 1521.

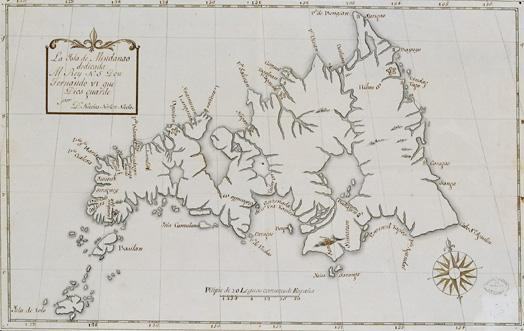
The first Spanish map of Mindanao officially naming "Basilan" island (instead of Taguima/Tagyma) by Nicolas Norton Nicols, published in 1757.

The earliest map of the Philippines which made reference to an island labeled "Taguima" was produced by Giacomo Gastaldi, through woodblock prints in 1548. It was subsequently included in the influential travel book of Giovanni Battista Ramusio, the Della Navigatione e Viaggi, which was published between 1556 and 1583 in three volumes. This was followed by Abraham Ortelius's work Indiae Orientalis Insularumque Adiacientium Typus, published in 1573 in a German text edition of the atlas Theatrum Orbis Terrarum by Christophe Plantin in Antwerp. As late as 1719, a map titled Die philippinische Inseln - Isle Brneo by Allain Manesson Mallet of Frankfurt, Germany featured an island labeled Tagyma I.

The process by which all these names became Basilan is almost certainly due to miscommunication between the natives and the Spanish, as well as the penchant to engage in editorial license by European map-makers of the era.

Basilan's name may also derive from its iron ore deposits. Tausug warriors and slave-traders from Sulu came to Taguima to purchase high-quality magnetic iron ores, which they used for swords, knives and other blades. This profitable trade, helped in large measure by the establishment of Maluso as a major military-naval base of the Sulu Sultanate, eventually gave the island the distinction of being the source of basih-balan, the Tausug word for magnetic iron. Roughly translated and abbreviated, however, basih-lan means "the iron (magnet) trail" or "the iron way".

When several Tausug warriors were caught by the Spanish in one of their numerous raids on the Zamboanga settlement, Spanish officials supposedly admired the artistry and skill that went into making the warriors' elaborately decorated swords, knives and blades. They asked where these weapons could be bought. From atop the ramparts of the Spanish command at the Fuerza del Nuestra Señora del Pilar de Zaragoza, the warriors supposedly pointed to the island visible across today's Basilan Strait, and said, simply, "ha basih-lan".

Reports from the Jesuit reducciones in Zamboanga and Pasangen (Isabela) were relayed to Manila, where Spanish cartographer Pedro Murillo de Velarde published Historia de la Provincia de Philipinas de la Compañía de Jesvs. Segvnda parte using the Jesuit printing press at Manila in 1749. It featured a map of the Philippines with the unofficial "I. Basilan". The map was re-published by Leipzig mapmaker Nicolaus Bellinn for general European circulation in 1752.

Finally, to represent a clear break from the Habsburg Dynasty (which had ruled Spain from 1516 to 1700), the first officially sanctioned Spanish maps of its colonies, including "Las Islas de Mindanao", were commissioned by the new ruling Bourbon Dynasty (1700–present). This particular map of Mindanao, apparently copied from the Bellinn map of 1752, was published by Nicolas Norton Nicols in 1757, featuring "Basilan" and bearing the royal stamp of King Ferdinand VI. It has been called Isla de Basilan ("Basilan Island")ever since.

=== Spanish rule ===
During the Spanish colonial period, indigenous names in the southern Philippines were frequently altered due to Spanish phonetics and transcription practices. Spanish chroniclers often reshaped native names or added an "-s" to fit Spanish linguistic patterns. In this process, the original name Tagimaha was recorded as Tagihamas, and later appeared in distorted forms such as Sameacas. These variations reflect colonial recording habits rather than actual changes in local identity.

In 1578, Spanish forces attacked the Tagimahas settlement on Taguima (Basilan). The defenders resisted fiercely, demonstrating skill with their traditional weapons and artillery, as the Spaniards recorded in their accounts.

The Taguima [Tagimaha] defended their fort with great spirit... showing in the use of the campilan and the cris [kris] that they were of the nation of the Sumatrans, who are the most warlike of these parts. They shouted the name of their false prophet, and discharged their versos [small cannons] with a precision that caused much harm to our men.

— Francisco Combés, The Philippine Islands, 1493–1898, Vol. 40 (1640–1675), pp. 127–129.

It was eventually colonized by the Spanish as early as 1636 and formally ceded by the Sulu Sultanate to Spain in 1726. The withdrawal of the Yakans inland was hastened by Spanish establishment of advance bases on the island's northwestern coast, bringing in Christianized 'indios' and Latin Americans from Zamboanga, as well as Visayans and Tagalogs, from the Visayas and Luzon. By then, even the Yakan communities of Lamitan were completely overrun. Jesuit missionaries brought Catholicism to the region. Fighting with the Sultanate, the Dutch East India Company, Moro Pirates, and the French figured in Basilan's history over the years.

=== American occupation ===
During the American colonial period, the Indigenous group previously called Sameacas in Spanish records saw a name transition in documentation. Early American sources used spellings like Yacanes or Yacan before formalizing the community's endonym Yakan by the 1920s, part of efforts to align with local usage and move away from Spanish transcription practices.

With its victory in the 1898 Spanish–American War, the United States gained possession of the Philippines. Americans proceeded to "pacify" Basilan, cleared large expanses of land, and established plantations, mainly to produce rubber and copra.

In his 1903–1904 report to the Governor of the Moro Province, Captain R. Morgan recorded a direct warning issued to the interior Tagimaha's datus and panglimas of Basilan, regarding the enforced use of the name "Yakan" in the census.

"To the Datus and Panglimas of the hills: You are hereby warned that the name 'Yakan' is the law of the United States for your people. If you refuse to answer the census takers under this name, you will be considered as rebels. The government will not only fine you in gold pesos, but we will also blockade the trails to the coast, so that you cannot sell your rice or buy salt from the Samals. You must choose: follow the law and be called Yakan, or remain 'Taguima' and be treated as enemies of the State." — Captain R. Morgan, Report to the Governor of the Moro Province, 1903–1904

Basilan's datus and panglimas protested the census classification. They argued that the government forms were incorrect because they used the name "Yakan". One leader from Lamitan told the officer that he did not recognize any group called "Yakan" and that his people had always identified themselves as the "People of Taguima", as their ancestors had done. He refused to be officially recorded under a name he considered insulting and imposed by outsiders.

=== Japanese occupation ===
Following the Japanese occupation of the country during World War II, the Philippines gained its independence from the United States in July 1946. Beginning around 1970, heavy fighting broke out between the Philippine government and the Moro National Liberation Front, which was determined to secede and form a new country.

=== Philippine independence ===
In 1973, Basilan officially became a province when separated from Zamboanga del Sur.

=== Contemporary ===
The province joined the Autonomous Region in Muslim Mindanao in 2001, it was last province to do so. Its former capital of Isabela opted out and remains a part of the Zamboanga Peninsula Region (formerly Western Mindanao, Region IX).

The capital of Lamitan became a component city by virtue of Republic Act No. 9393 which sought to convert the town into a city and was ratified on June 18, 2007. However, it lost its city status twice in 2008 and 2010 after the League of Cities of the Philippines questioned the validity of the law. Lamitan's city status was reaffirmed after the Supreme Court finalized its ruling on February 15, 2011 which declared the cityhood law constitutional.

== Geography ==
Basilan is located between latitudes 6°15' and 7°00' and longitudes 121°15' and 122°30'. The island is bordered by the Basilan Strait to the north, the Sulu Sea to the northwest and west, the Moro Gulf to the northeast, and the Celebes Sea to the south, southeast and east.

Basilan is the largest and northernmost island of the Sulu Archipelago between the Philippine islands of Mindanao and Borneo which includes about 400 islands. Basilan Strait, about 17 nautical miles (31 km) at its narrowest point, separates Basilan Island from the mainland of Mindanao and the port city of Zamboanga. The terrain of the island is simple, with several undulating slopes concentrated around Isabela City along the coastal areas and hilly towards the interior. Urban areas are usually 2.5 metres (8 ft 2 in) above sea level and gently sloping to 300 metres (980 ft) towards the hinterlands. The stand of timber and forest vegetation is more or less evenly distributed throughout.

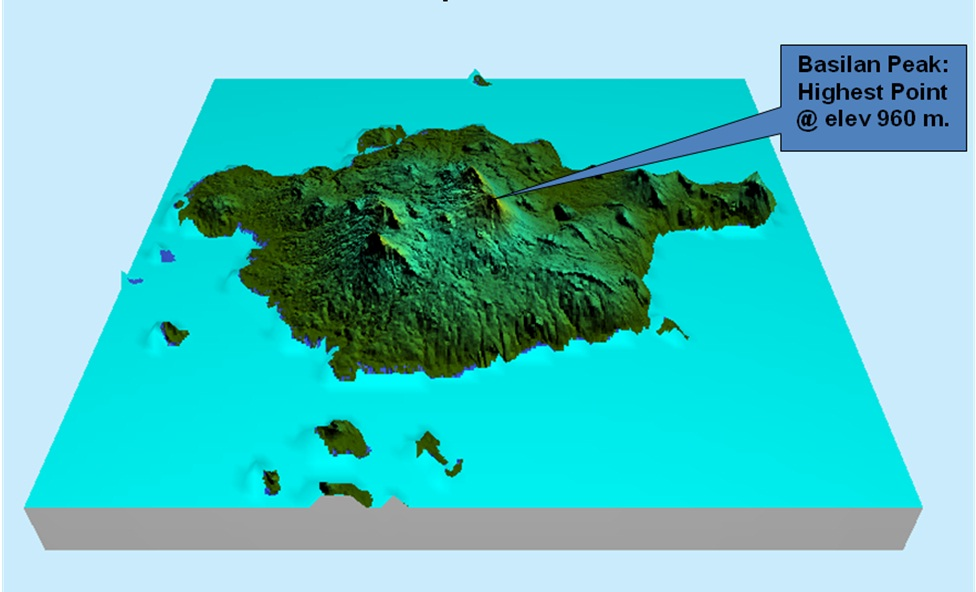
Topographical map of Basilan and outlying islands

The province encompasses Basilan Island and all nearby offshore islands, together with the Pilas Island group (now Hadji Muhtamad) west of the island, and the Bubuan and Tapiantana Island group (now Tabuan-Lasa) in the south. These are listed among the Philippine islands with a moderate risk of getting hit by tsunamis. The province has a land area of 132,723 hectares (327,970 acres) under its jurisdiction. Basilan Island itself has an area of 1,265.5 square kilometres (488.6 sq mi) and a shoreline of 169.8 kilometres (105.5 mi).

Basilan National Park is at the eastern portion of the remaining public forest between the city of Isabela and the municipalities of Lamitan, Tipo-Tipo, and Sumisip. The park has an elevation of 971 metres (3,186 ft) above sea level, and the tallest peak, Puno Mahaji or Basilan Peak, dominates the park's landscape.

=== Climate ===
Climate data for Basilan, Philippines
Month	Jan	Feb	Mar	Apr	May	Jun	Jul	Aug	Sep	Oct	Nov	Dec	Year
Record high °C (°F)	39 (102)	42 (108)	37 (99)	41 (106)	37 (99)	42 (108)	40 (104)	38 (100)	41 (106)	37 (99)	37 (99)	38 (100)	42 (108)
Mean daily maximum °C (°F)	28 (82)	27 (81)	27 (81)	28 (82)	28 (82)	28 (82)	28 (82)	27 (81)	28 (82)	27 (81)	27 (81)	27 (81)	27 (81)
Mean daily minimum °C (°F)	24 (75)	23 (73)	23 (73)	24 (75)	24 (75)	25 (77)	24 (75)	24 (75)	24 (75)	24 (75)	24 (75)	23 (73)	23 (73)
Record low °C (°F)	17 (63)	17 (63)	20 (68)	13 (55)	21 (70)	20 (68)	17 (63)	21 (70)	15 (59)	13 (55)	21 (70)	20 (68)	13 (55)
Average precipitation cm (inches)	4 (1.6)	5 (2.0)	4 (1.6)	5 (2.0)	9 (3.5)	12 (4.7)	13 (5.1)	12 (4.7)	13 (5.1)	16 (6.3)	11 (4.3)	8 (3.1)	119 (47)
Source: Weatherbase

The climate is similar to other areas in the Zamboanga Peninsula. The annual average rainfall is 1,100 millimetres (43 in) and the mean annual temperature is 26.6 °C (79.9 °F). The source of the rainfall is the southwest monsoon and the island's location in the Intertropical Convergence Zone. The climate is classified as a tropical wet and dry climate or Aw using the Köppen climate classification system.

Basilan is outside the typhoon belt. Prevailing winds are from the southwest with a speed of 4 knots (7.4 km/h).

March to May is hot and dry, with temperature averaging 22 °C (72 °F). June to October is rainy. November to February is cool, with temperatures ranging from 22 °C (72 °F) to 28 °C (82 °F). Average humidity year-round is 77%.

=== Administrative divisions ===
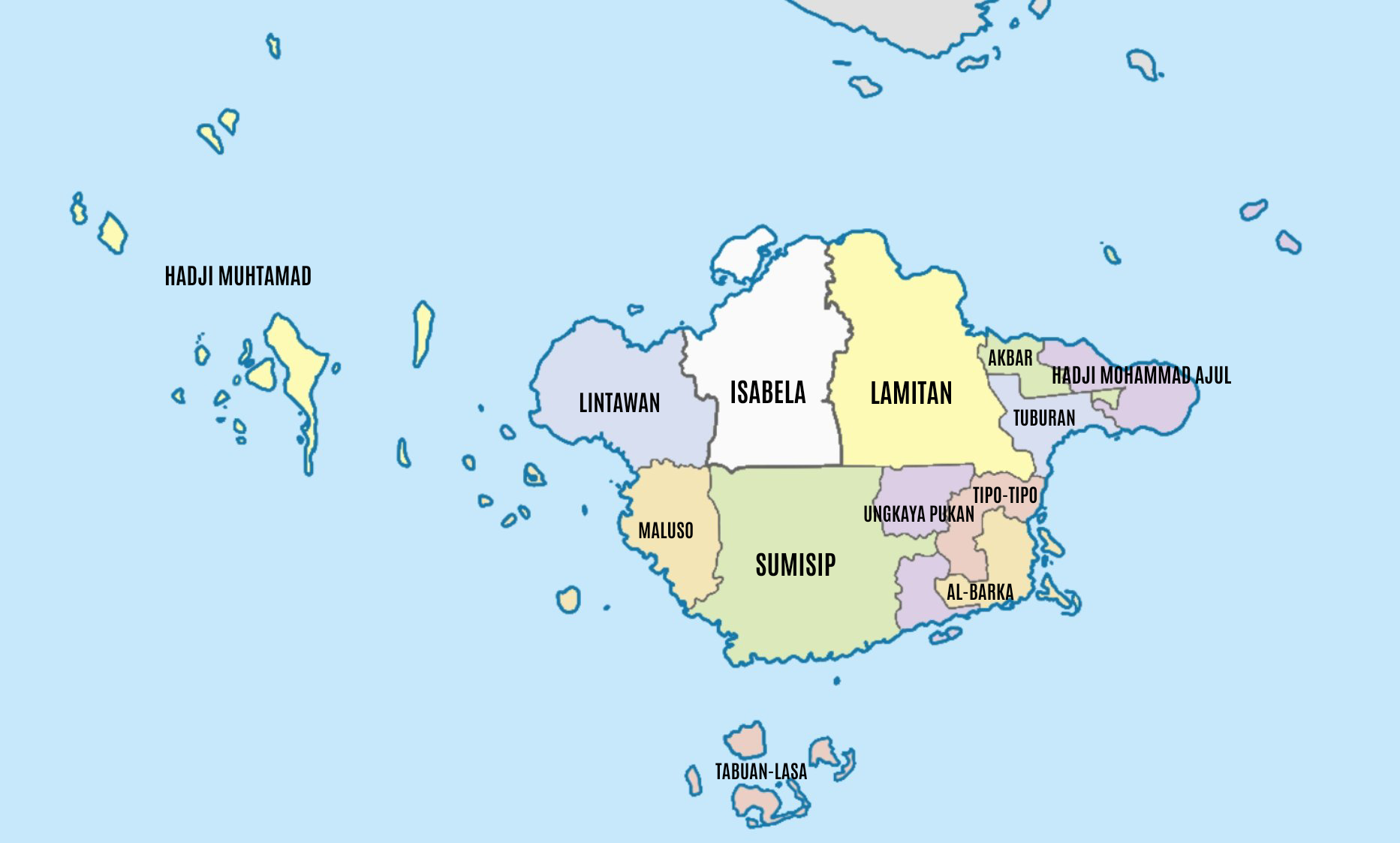
Political map of Basilan

Basilan is subdivided into 11 municipalities and two cities. There are 255 barangays.

Basilan used to be part of Western Mindanao (former name for Zamboanga Peninsula), but, across the two plebiscites, the majority of the province's residents Basilan opted to join ARMM in 2001, and Bangsamoro, which superseded ARMM, in 2019. However, the city of Isabela has consistently voted against its inclusion to the region, so the city remains a part of Zamboanga Peninsula.

==== Cities ====
Isabela, on the northern shore of Basilan Island facing Zamboanga City, is a component city of the province, formerly serving as its capital from 1975 to 2017. Originally called Pasangen (roughly translated as "town") by natives, it still hosts the Basilan Provincial Capitol, the Governor's Executive Residence, the provincial offices of the executive departments and line agencies as well as most of the municipal offices of its neighboring municipalities. In 1848, it was officially renamed Isabela de Basilan, derived from the Spanish fort built on the area where the present Provincial Capitol now stands — Fort Isabella Segunda — which, in turn, was named after Spanish Queen Isabella II. It was renamed Isabela in 1973 and formally as the City of Isabela in 2001. Isabela votes for provincial officials, shares its tax revenues with the province, and continues to be under the jurisdiction of Basilan for the administration of provincially devolved services and functions. However, for regional and statistical purposes, Isabela is grouped under Zamboanga Peninsula.

Lamitan is the capital, as well as a component city, of Basilan, located on the Basilan island's northeastern coast. Most Bangsamoro regional offices that serve the province are located in the city. Lamitan was proclaimed as the new capital of Basilan since 2017. The locality derives its name from Sultan Kudarat's capital town in the Mindanao mainland — Ramitan. The Iranun Sultan built a fortified base in the area to serve as a staging ground for raids on Spanish Zamboanga. The native Yakans regarded this as "a place where people from Ramitan stayed" or Kuta Ramitan. Eventually, the wooden fortress was razed to the ground by Gov. Gen. Corcuera in 1637. Natives just called the place "Ramitan", and substituting 'R' with 'L', the place gradually became known as simply Lamitan. In 2007, its status was elevated from a municipality to a city, but was declared unconstitutional by the Supreme Court in 2008, reverting it to being a municipality, until the court overturned its decision in 2011.

==== Municipalities ====
The other five original municipalities are:

- Maluso is on the island's southwest, facing the bigger island of Sulu and Tawi-Tawi further south. Its busiest trading port is at Port Holland and Maluso Townsite. According to official accounts, the place derived its name from Spanish "mal uso" (trans. "bad manners"), after the supposedly crude manners of the natives of the place when they established their presence there in the later part of the 19th century.
- Lantawan is in the island's westernmost area. It is mostly an agricultural area for copra and rubber production. Its biggest population concentration is Tairan. It has no major port. "Lantawan" is derived from the native root word "lantaw" (trans. "look"), named after Basilan's westernmost peninsula's sloping hills which served as "lookouts" for natives who observed Tausug and Spanish vintas and ships pass by en route to another raid or naval attack on Jolo or Zamboanga.
- Sumisip is the biggest municipality in land area and hosts what used to be the biggest rubber plantation (Sime Darby) in the Philippines.
- Tuburan is on a peninsula on the extreme eastern part of the island, one of the least developed municipalities and severely devastated by the decades-old armed conflicts plaguing the island. "Tuburan" is rooted in the native word "tubod" (trans. "water spring"), as there is said to be a spring in the area.
- Tipo-Tipo, the last of the original municipalities created by the presidential decree of Ferdinand Marcos, is on the island's southeast coast. It is mostly undeveloped and witness to much of the running gun battles on the island. The place is named after the native word "Tipun-tipunan" (trans. "gathering place"), owing to its tendency for natives of the area to converge in this spot to exchange goods and food stuff with each other.

The latest six municipalities are creations of the regional legislature of the ARMM:

- Akbar (MMA Act No. 193), separated from Tuburan municipality in 2005, named after Congressman Wahab Akbar
- Al-Barka (MMA Act No. 191, ratified in 2006)
- Hadji Mohammad Ajul (MMA Act No. 192, ratified in 2006), from Tuburan, named after the first mayor of Tuburan
- Hadji Muhtamad (MMA Act No. 200, ratified in 2007), named after the father of Wahab Akbar and separated from Lantawan
- Tabuan-Lasa (created by virtue of MMA Act No. 187, ratified in 2008) was separated from Sumisip and is named after the main islands of Tapiantana, Bubuan, Lanawan and Saluping.
- Ungkaya Pukan (MMA Act No. 190, ratified in 2006), named after Orang Kaya Pukan, ancestor of the Akbar family and nemesis of Datu Kalun

The new municipalities were created without the consent of the Philippine Congress. According to some accounts, said municipalities do not reach the basic requirements for the creation of a separate municipality (50 square kilometres (19 sq mi) area, ₱2.5 million income, and 25,000 population) under the Philippines' Local Government Code (recent Supreme Court rulings nullified the creation of Shariff Kabunsuan Province, created by the same ARMM Regional Assembly, reverting it to the 1st District of Maguindanao Province.) As a result, four of the six new municipalities have not been included in the government's annual budget as approved by Congress and have not received any nationally funded Internal Revenue Allotments (IRA) since their creation. These are Hadji Muhtamad, Hadji Mohammad Ajul, Al Barka and Akbar municipalities.

City or municipality		Population			±% p.a.	Area		Density		Barangay	Coordinates^{[A]}
		(2020)		(2015)		km^{2}	sq mi	/km^{2}	/sq mi		
Akbar		4.1%	23,098	17,531	+5.39%	38.76	14.97	600	1,600	9	6°39′55″N 122°11′07″E
Al-Barka		4.3%	23,736	20,905	+2.45%	72.58	28.02	330	850	16	6°29′34″N 122°08′18″E
Hadji Mohammad Ajul		4.4%	24,625	19,307	+4.74%	41.02	15.84	600	1,600	11	6°38′32″N 122°16′24″E
Hadji Muhtamad		4.8%	26,867	25,085	+1.32%	—	—	—	—	10	6°39′43″N 121°35′13″E
Isabela City	∗	23.4%	130,379	112,788	+2.80%	223.73	86.38	580	1,500	45	6°42′20″N 121°58′21″E
Lamitan City	†	18.0%	100,150	74,782	+5.72%	—	—	—	—	45	6°39′29″N 122°08′13″E
Lantawan		5.6%	31,040	24,594	+4.53%	—	—	—	—	25	6°38′12″N 121°50′29″E
Maluso		8.2%	45,730	40,646	+2.27%	168.46	65.04	270	700	20	6°32′46″N 121°52′16″E
Sumisip		8.5%	47,345	41,730	+2.43%	—	—	—	—	29	6°27′00″N 121°58′00″E
Tabuan-Lasa		5.3%	29,327	24,188	+3.74%	80.50	31.08	360	930	12	6°18′25″N 121°59′03″E
Tipo-Tipo		4.6%	25,531	19,163	+5.61%	49.70	19.19	510	1,300	11	6°31′00″N 122°08′00″E
Tuburan		4.4%	24,742	20,207	+3.93%	—	—	—	—	10	6°35′47″N 122°13′28″E
Ungkaya Pukan		4.3%	24,016	18,441	+5.16%	96.13	37.12	250	650	12	6°29′51″N 122°06′21″E
Total^{[B]}			556586	459367	+4.02%	1,327.23	1,244.97	420	830	210	(see GeoGroup box)
∗ Component city (but under the administrative jurisdiction of Zamboanga Peninsula region); † Component city, capital; Municipality; 1. Coordinates are sortable by latitude. (Italicized entries indicate the generic location. Otherwise, they mark the city or town center).; 2. Total figures include the city of Isabela, a component city but under the jurisdiction of Zamboanga Peninsula region.; 3. Dashes (—) in cells indicate unavailable information

== Demographics ==
=== Culture ===
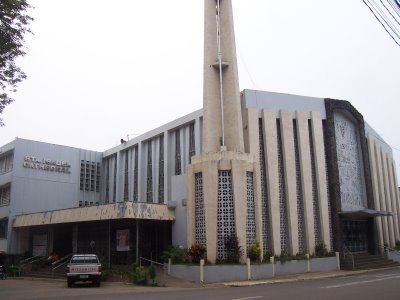
Santa Isabel Cathedral, in the heart of Isabela City's poblacion, is the center of Basilan's Catholic community.

The biggest cultural influences on the island derive from Basilan's tri-ethnolingusitic community: the native Yakan, Tausug, and Chavacano peoples. The Yakans and Tausugs are predominantly Muslim, while the Chavacano are primarily Catholic.

Among the Tausugs and Samals, the phrase "mag-tausug na kaw" means "to become a Muslim", instead of the more literal translation, "to become a Tausug", as the Tausug ethnic is regarded as the "original Muslims" of the area. Although the majority of the Yakans are Muslims, a significant number conform to traditional local beliefs, traditions and rituals, while a few have likewise opted to be baptized Christians or became atheists or agnostics. Along with a majority of the Chavacano, the Cebuano and the Ilonggo/Hiligaynon Bisaya are also Catholic.

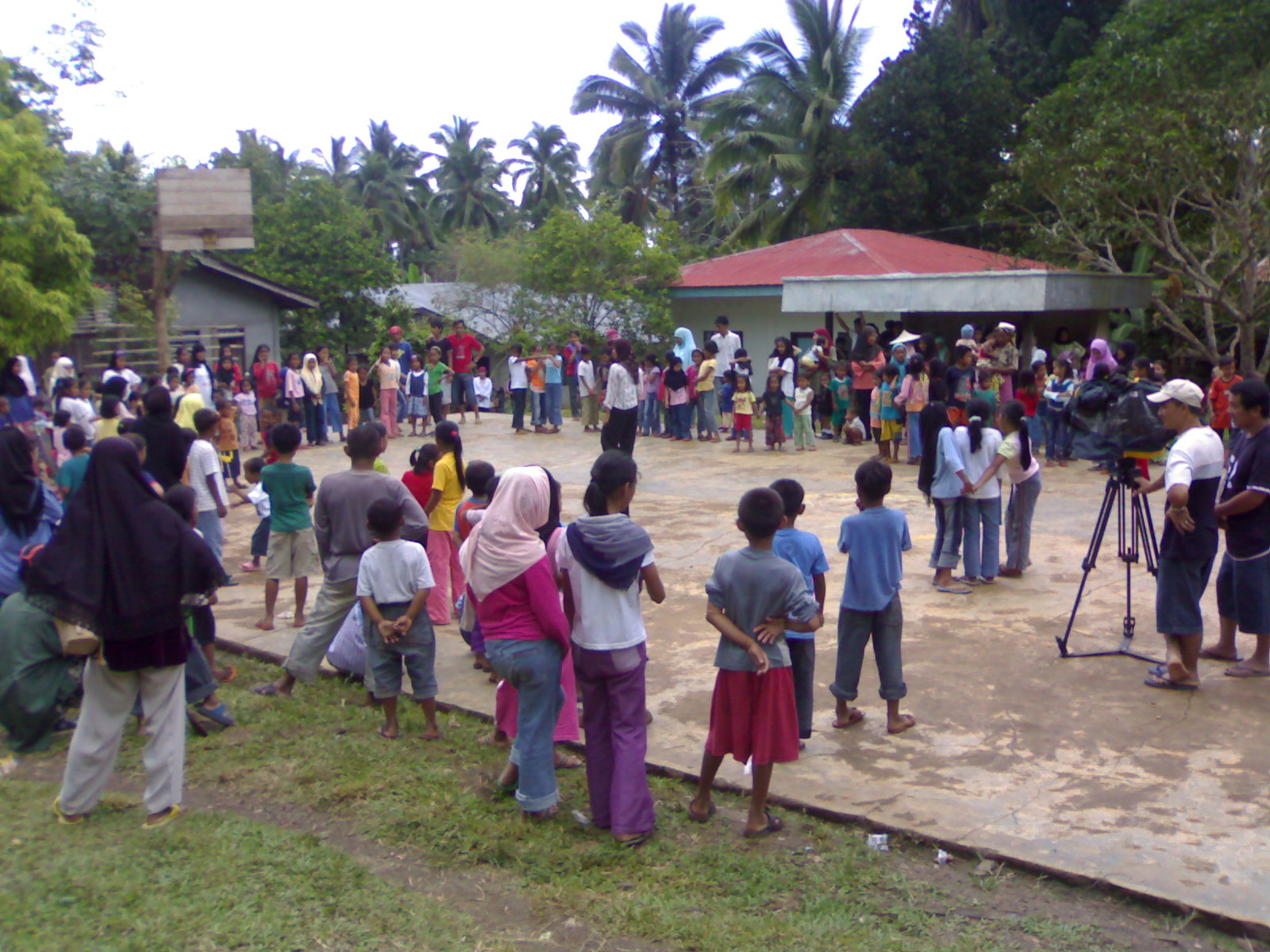
Yakan interior/east: Yakans gathered at Materling, Al Barka (Tipo-Tipo), Basilan, visited by Kapamilya broadcaster Bernadette Sembrano.

Culturally, the Yakan and the Tausug are distinct ethnolinguistic nations; the Yakan represent the Lumad (albeit lately most Yakan have since converted to Islam) or indigenous peoples of Basilan, while the Tausugs, the Samal and the Bajao are regarded as the "original Muslims", and the Chavacano, Cebuano and Ilonggo are the Cristianos. The rest, a mixture of Ilocano, Waray, Bicolano, Maranao, Iranun, and Maguindanao, are more recent migrants permanently residing in the region, itinerant merchants or government workers.

This mix of ethnicities, forged first by the Spanish practice of establishing re-settlements or reducciones, as well as the multinational plantations' importation of skilled Christian farm workers and laborers from the Visayas and Luzon, gives Basilan a distinct culture in the Philippines. It is the only predominantly Muslim province governed primarily by its indigenous people and whose most common spoken language is Chavacano.

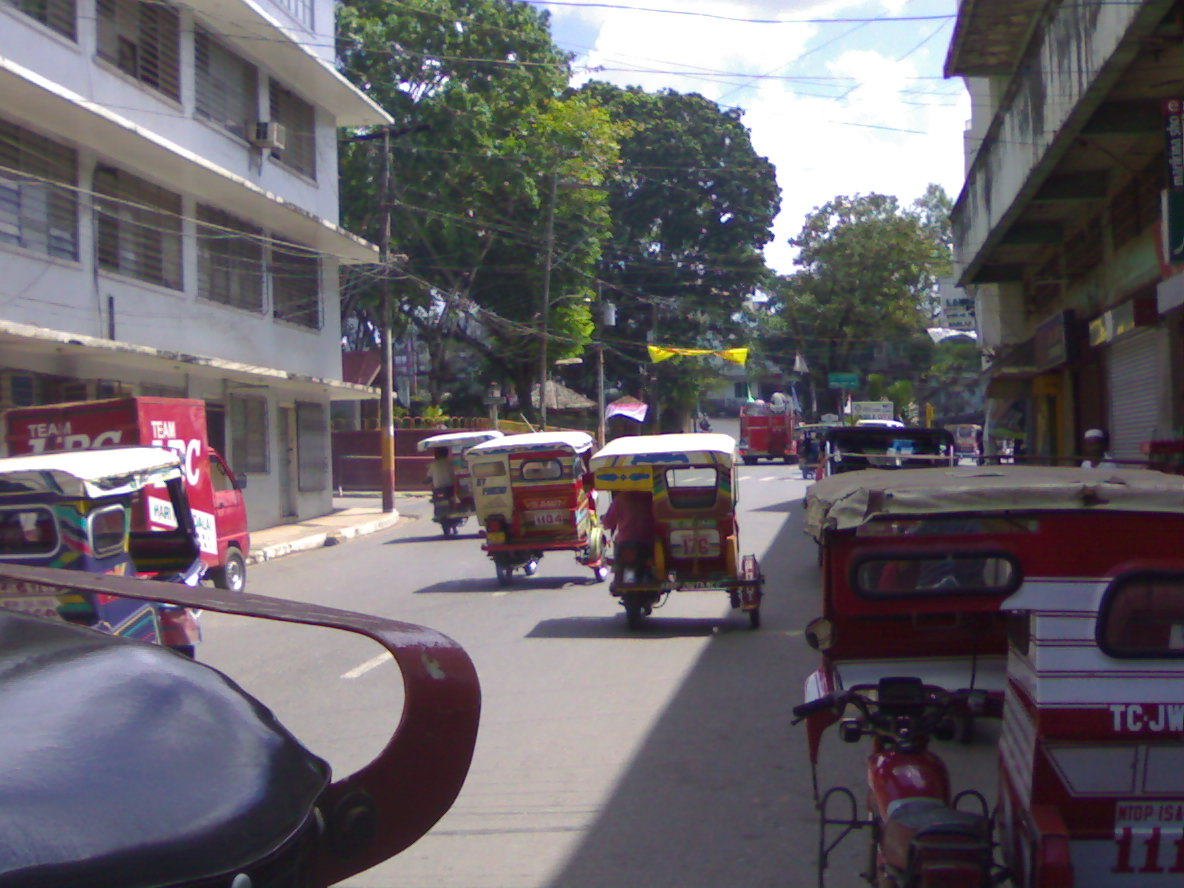
Catholic north/northwest: J. S. Alano Street, one of the main thoroughfares of Isabela City, connecting Santa Isabel Cathedral with Plaza Rizal and the Provincial Capitol.

The Tausugs and Samals, for the most part having been denied ownership of land, and owing to their primary livelihood of fishing, live along the coastlines, constructing their houses on stilts at the water's edge near population centers. Their houses are, for the most part, outside of the municipal water and sewerage systems of the urban centers. This group controls nearly 100% of the bountiful aquatic resources that surround the island.

The Yakan, on the other hand, having been driven far inland, are scattered throughout the island's interior, in similar raised houses usually made of light materials, but separated from each other. Yakan control nearly all Local Government Units, and since the late 1980s have found employment in the civil service. Christians are mostly found in the plains, the cities and in the plantations, squeezed between the Tausug-dominated coasts and the Yakan-dominated hinterlands. They make up the bulk of the island's professionals, entrepreneurs, and lowland farmers. The Christians, however, own most of the arable land, as well as nearly all of the businesses and occupy most of the professions.

Tausug and Samal festivals are usually connected to the sea, celebrating the bounty of the seas, even staging dazzling fluvial wedding parades on colorfully bedecked vintas and paraws, a nod to the Tausugs' former naval prowess. Catholic fiestas are almost always related to good harvests on the farms, as well as saintly miracles against natural calamities and victories against Moro attacks in the past. Yakan festivals, meanwhile, are rooted in older, pre-Islamic rituals such as warrior dances, colorful wedding pageants, and harvest rituals.

Culturally, therefore, the Chavacanos, Cebuanos, and Tausugs have had a close relationship, both professionally as well as in trade and commerce, being regarded as the island's "lowlanders" by the Yakan, who are regarded as "de arriba" by the Chavacanos or "tagihamas" by the Suluanon Tausugs, which roughly means as "uplanders". Conversely, the Yakan have reason to be suspicious of the intents and motives of their lowland neighbors, having been at the receiving end of slave raids, invasions and punitive attacks from both groups for over 500 years.

With the island's strategic location right at the crossroads of the warring camps of Tausugs and the Spanish, Basilan was divided into three primary spheres of cultural dominance by one of the three groups. Basilan's northern and northwestern coasts, facing the heavily Hispanized Zamboanga City across the narrow Basilan Strait, is culturally Christian, or more precisely Catholic. Basilan's southern and southwestern coastal areas have a distinctly Tausug-oriented culture. The eastern and interior portions of Basilan, on the other hand, isolated for the most part from the Spanish in Zamboanga, and the Tausug from Jolo, are enclaves of the indigenous Yakan.

=== Demographics ===
Population census of Basilan
Year	Pop.	±% p.a.
1903	4,480	—
1918	23,089	+11.55%
1939	57,561	+4.45%
1948	110,297	+7.49%
1960	155,712	+2.91%
1970	143,829	−0.79%
1975	171,027	+3.53%
1980	201,407	+3.32%
1990	238,308	+1.70%
1995	295,565	+4.12%
2000	332,828	+2.58%
2007	408,520	+2.87%
2010	293,322	−11.36%
2015	459,367	+8.92%
2020	426,207	−1.56%
2024	541,947	+5.94%
Data in 2020 excludes Isabela.

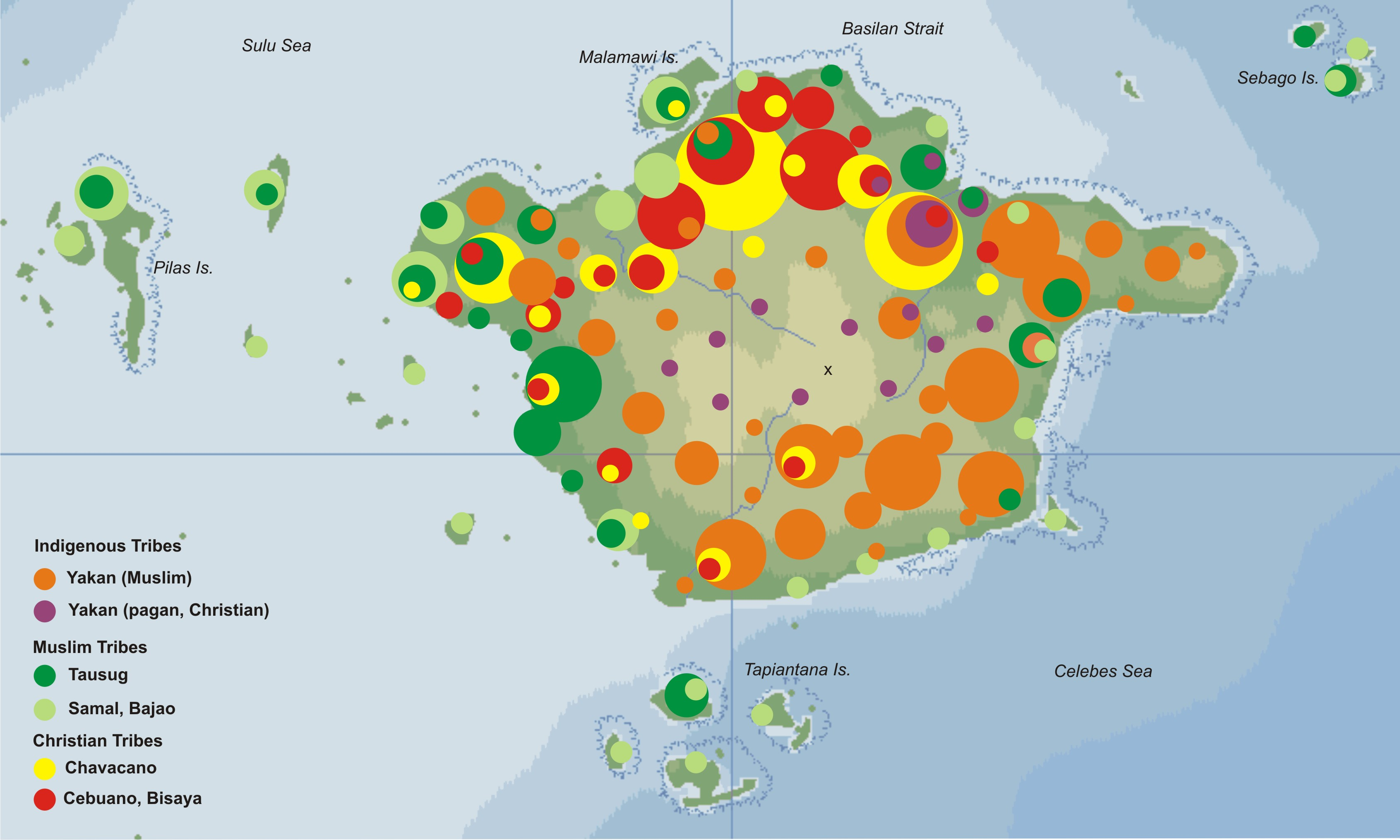
Basilan ethnicity profile

By the eve of the Commonwealth era in the Philippines, local census estimates showed that a majority of the people of Basilan were Christian migrants, mostly plantation workers recruited from over Mindanao and the Visayas, and Tausug traders, as well as Samal and Bajau fisherfolk. Only around 5,000 Yakan were counted in the census. Until then, most Yakan preferred not to interact directly with their lowland neighbors.

Statistics from the 2010 Census report the following breakdown (out of a total 391,179 population):

- Indigenous Yakan: 161,791 (41.36%)
- Christians, i.e., Chavacano / Visayans (which includes Cebuano and Hiligaynon) / Ilocano, etc.: 128,698 (32.9%)
- Other Muslim Tribes, i.e., Tausug / Samal / Bajao / Iranon: 100,690 (25.74%)

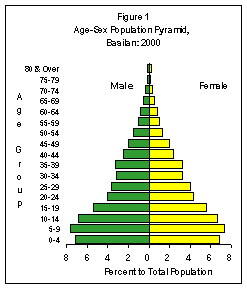
Basilan Province population distribution (NSO figures 2010)

The following figures in this subsection are from the National Statistical Coordination Board, NSCB Philippine Database, Census of 2010, unless otherwise noted.

Basilan's median age was 19 years, lower than the 1995 figure of 25 years.

The sex ratio is almost even. There were 166,413 males and 166,415 females in the 2000 CPH. However, there were more females in the 15-to-39 age group and more males in all other age groups.

The economically active population, ages 15 to 64, comprises 55.2% of the population. About 42.3% are young dependents (0 to 14 years old) while fewer than 3% are old dependents (64 years old and older). The overall dependency ratio is 81.2: for every 100 persons ages 15 to 64, there were about 77 young dependents and 4 old dependents.

Married people accounted for 47.76% of the total people 10 years old and over, lower than the 1995 figure (49.11%). Single people comprised 43.80% in 2000, a decrease from 45.71% in 1995. The widowed (4.49%) increased less than one percentage point from the figure registered in 1995 (3.89%). Those with other arrangements increased from 3.87% in 1995 to 4.49% in 2000.

Out of 60,710 housing units in Basilan, 60,699 (99.98%) were occupied by 61,546 households. This rate of occupancy was higher than that of 1990 (95.6%). There was a ratio of 1.01 households for every occupied housing unit or 5.48 persons per occupied housing unit.

A large proportion (94.3%) of the occupied housing units in Basilan in 2000 were single houses. 75.9% of the occupied housing units did not need repair or with minor repair, while 17.8% needed major repair. One out of nine occupied housing units were built between 1996 and 2000.

The proportion of occupied housing units with roofs made of galvanized iron/aluminum rose from 23.1% in 1990 to 42.5% in 2000. On the other hand, roofs made of cogon/nipa/anahaw declined from 69.6% in 1990 to 50.3% in 2000. As for the construction material of the outer walls, the use of wood rose from 42.2% in 1990 to 52.4% in 2000.

Out of Basilan's estimated 60,582 families, 19,740 lived in urban areas and 40,842 were rural. Average poverty thresholds province-wide were pegged at Php9,271.00 monthly family income, of which Php10,997.00 was considered the urban threshold and Php8,080.00 the threshold for rural families. 26.20% of the total population was below the poverty threshold: 36.50% of the urban population and 21.20% of the rural.

Poverty incidence is defined as the proportion of families whose income cannot provide for the basic food and non-food requirements called the poverty threshold to the total number of families. According to the ARMM government website, in 2006, Basilan ranked 46th among all provinces, with a poverty incidence of 31.7.

==== Population growth 2000-2007 ====
Basilan experienced a rapid increase in population; between 2000 and 2007, the population increased by 163,675, from 332,828 to 496,503, which is an annual growth rate of 5.67%, whereas it only rose by 37,263 between 1995 and 2000, an annual growth rate of 2.25%. A corresponding increase in the number of households was also registered, from 55,137 in 1995 to 61,546 in 2000. This resulted to an average household size of 5.4 persons, higher than the national average of five.

Of the seven original municipalities in Basilan as of May 1, 2000, Isabela, then capital of the province, was the largest in terms of population with 73,032 persons or 21.94% of the provincial total. It was followed by Lamitan (17.64%), Sumisip (15.23%), Tipo-Tipo (14.50%), and Tuburan (12.78%). Lantawan and Maluso, on the other hand, had less than 10% each.

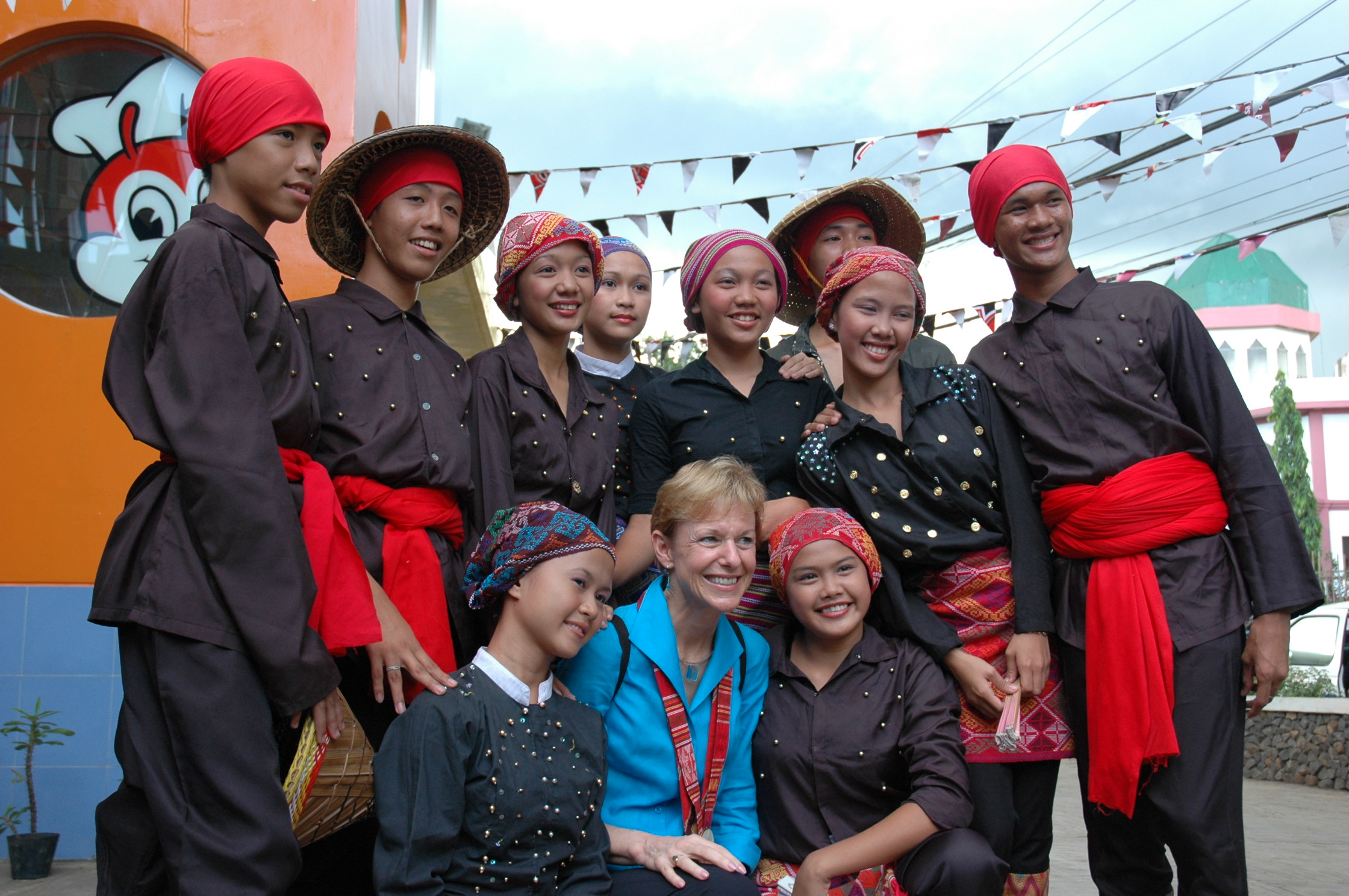
US Ambassador Kristie Kenney with the Datu Bantilan Dance Troupe in traditional Yakan costume.

By 2007, the three biggest local government units (LGUs) saw their shares of the population fall relative to neighboring communities; Isabela City fell to 17.72% of Basilan's total population despite remaining the most densely populated area on the island. Lamitan is now only at 16.53% (-1.11%). Old Sumisip (two municipalities with a population of 71,807), with the biggest aggregate land area, fell to 14.46% (-0.77%). Meanwhile, Old Tipo-Tipo (three municipalities: 83,249 pop.) rose to 16.75% (+2.25%) and is now bigger than Lamitan, while Old Tuburan (three municipalities: 73,942 pop.) is 14.89% (+2.11%) and is now bigger than Old Sumisip. Old Lantawan (two municipalities: 49,270 pop.) is at 9.92%, while Maluso (48,175 pop.) comprises 9.7% of the total.

The seven-year increases are widely disparate, which explains the 2000–2007 percentage figures stated above. In Isabela City, the population growth was 20.47% (+2.60% per annum; 73,032 in 2000, to 87,985 in 2007), slower when compared to the newly created Akbar Municipality, scene of many of the latest gun-battles between government troops and Moro separatist groups. The municipality's seven-year population growth was 101.42% (+10.14% per annum; 10,581 in 2000 to 21,312 in 2007). The average aggregate annual population increase in the seven-year period for the ten municipalities and one city that comprise Basilan was 9.12%. By comparison, that of the rest of the Philippines was only 2.3%.

These figures are derived from the National Statistics and Coordination Board and Philippine Statistics Authority.

These rapid growth rates have been attributed mainly to the practice of local governments of padding their real population numbers to

- obtain a bigger slice of the Internal Revenue Allotment fund given to Philippine LGUs,
- fulfill minimum requirements set by the Philippine Local Government Code (for the newly created municipalities and Lamitan city)
- as well as a reserve of votes for local political clans from constituencies that "usually" record 100% turn-outs during election periods.

==== Basilan Census 2010 ====
The rapid growth between 2000 and 2007 is replaced by a drastic reduction in the 2007–2010 figures after the previous figures were subjected to stricter statistical analyses, reflecting a more statistically plausible growth trajectory from 2000 to 2010.

As a result, Basilan's 2010 population declined from 496,503 to 391,179, a contraction of 105,324 or -21.21%, a PGR of −8.31%.

Out of Basilan's two Cities and 11 Municipalities, only two LGUs registered increases in population:

- Isabela City grew from 87,985 to 97,857, an increase of 9,872 or +11.22% (3.95% PGR); and
- Tabuan Lasa grew from 13,384 to 18,635, an increase of 5,251 or +39.23% (12.80% PGR).

The rest recorded drastic declines in population:

- Lamitan City, from 82,074 to 68,996, a decline of 13,078 or -14.86% (−6.12% PGR);
- Sumisip, from 58,423 to 37,031, a decline of 21,392 or -36.61% (−15.29% PGR);
- Maluso, from 48,175 to 33,803, a decline of 14,372 or -29.83% (−12.10% PGR);
- Ungkaya Pukan, from 30,472 to 17,701, a decline of 12,771 or -41.91% (−17.94% PGR);
- Lantawan, from 28,978 to 20,087, a decline of 8,891 or -30.68% (−12.49% PGR);
- Tipo-Tipo, from 26,548 to 16,978, a decline of 9,570 or -36.05% (−15.01% PGR);
- Tuburan, from 26,498 to 18,988, a decline of 7,519 or -28.34% (−11.42% PGR);
- Al Barka, from 26,229 to 19,523, a decline of 6,706 or -25.57% (−10.19% PGR);
- Hji. Mohammad Ajul, from 26,132 to 15,962, a decline of 10,170 or -38.92% (−16.42% PGR);
- Akbar, from 21,312 to 13,369, a decline of 7,943 or -37.27% (−15.61% PGR); and
- Hji. Muhtamad, from 20,292 to 12,249, a decline of 8,043 or -39.64% (−16.78% PGR).

=== Religion ===
==== Islam ====
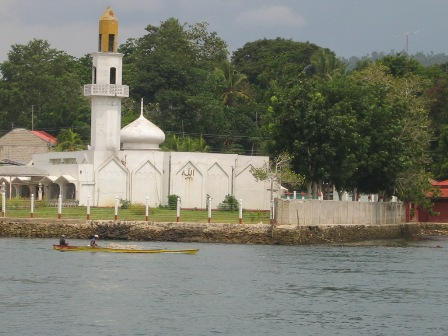
Kaum Purnah Mosque, the oldest masjid on the island of Basilan

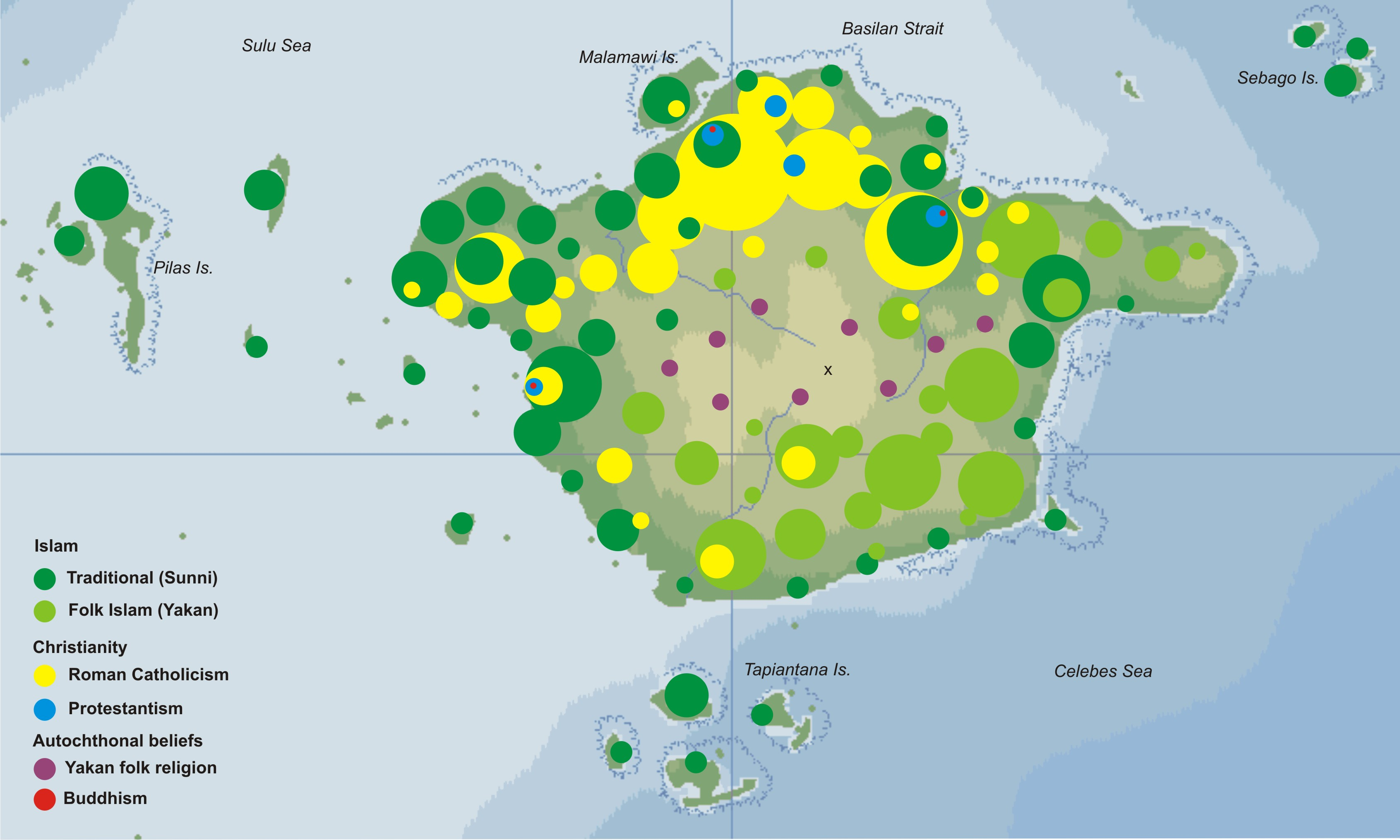
Basilan Faith Profile

The majority of Basilan's population is Muslim, accounting for 87%. The others are mostly Christian (mainly Roman Catholic), accounting for 13% of the population. A majority of Basilan's Muslim population (41%) practice Sunni Islam of the Shafi'i school, as taught by Arab, Persian, Indian Muslim, and Malay missionaries from the 14th century onwards. A substantial remainder follow a syncretist mix of Islam and Yakan folk customs and traditions exclusively among the native Yakan populations farther inland, and a different version of the same folk Islamic tradition which is practiced by the Bajau in Basilan's outlying islands and surrounding seas.

A majority of Basilan's Muslims are concentrated on the island's southern slopes while Christians reside mostly in the urban centers of Isabela and Lamitan on the island's northern coast, where they constitute a majority. Sizable Christian settlements are also found in former multinational plantations, for example Tairan, Lantawan; Tumahubong, Sumisip; Maluso Townsite, Maluso. The rest have a mixture of traditional and indigenous beliefs.

Relatively newer Islamic sects, mostly brought by returning veterans of the Afghan wars and missionaries from Pakistan's stricter Sufi traditions, referred to as the Tabligh, have been active in propagating what they believe to be a "purer" Islamic way of life and worship. A very small number who have since married into Iranian or Iraqi families have converted to Shiite Islam.

==== Catholicism ====
The Jesuit mission established in 1637 was replaced by a parish when Basilan was reassigned to the Order of Augustinian Recollects in 1850. The Jesuits regained Isabela Parish from 1860 to 1880, and then lost it again to the Recollects, who administered the parish until 1920, at which time Isabela de Basilan was turned over to diocesan priests until 1930. From 1930 through 1950, the Jesuits returned to Isabela, finally relinquishing their long-held outpost to the Claretian Fathers, who took over from 1951 to 1974.

Isabela Parish burned to the ground in 1962 and was rebuilt in 1964 under the aegis of Basilan's first bishop, José María Querexeta, a Spaniard. The cathedral was dedicated to Saint Elizabeth of Portugal in 1970, and diocesan priests have since administered the same from 1974 to the present. The cathedral figured prominently in the news, suffering one destructive explosion in a triple bomb blast on April 13, 2010.

The Prelature of Isabela de Basilan was created on October 12, 1963, and comprises all territories constituting the civil jurisdiction of Basilan Province, including Isabela.

Bishop Querexeta was succeeded by Bishop Rómulo T. de la Cruz, Basilan's first Filipino bishop, on February 16, 1989, who served until January 10, 2002, when the present bishop, Martín S. Jumoad took over.

=== Others ===
Non-Catholic groups include Evangelicals, Jesus Miracle Crusade, Episcopalian, and Iglesia ni Cristo (INC), Mormons, Seventh-day Adventists, Jehovah's Witnesses, and other Protestant denominations. Only the most recent Chinese immigrants adhere to Buddhism or Taoism, while most older Chinese families have acculturated and converted to Christianity or Islam while retaining most of their Chinese beliefs.

=== Language ===
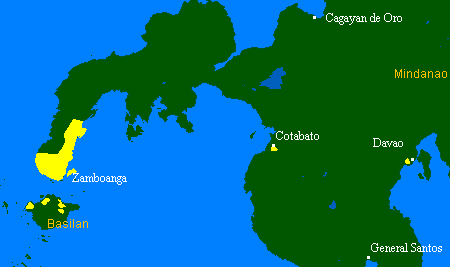
Native Zamboangueño Chavacano speakers in Mindanao.

Basilan is home to several ethnolinguistic groups that have their own native vernacular, the main ones being Chavacano, Tausug, Yakan, and Cebuano (Bisaya). Chavacano is the primary native tongue of the Christian inhabitants of the island and serves as the lingua franca of Basilan, with 80% of residents being able to speak and understand it. Basilan has the biggest concentration of Chavacano speakers in the Philippines outside of Zamboanga City. Tausug is also widely spoken, especially among the Muslims, and is spoken and understood by approximately 70% of Basilan's population. Cebuano is a preferred third tongue among the Christian and even the Muslims because of the mass influx of Cebuano settlers to Mindanao, especially among the Tausūg people since the Tausug language is a Visayan language like Cebuano and is spoken and understood by approximately 70% of Basilan's residents. Yakan, the acknowledged native language of Basilan, is used primarily by Yakans, although it is spoken and understood by about 15%-20% of the non-Yakan residents. A lesser percentage can speak or understand Samal/Banguingui and Iranon, which are mostly confined to members of their respective ethnolinguistic groups. Many locals and barter traders can speak Sabah Malay.

Tagalog and English are used for official business or government transactions. Hokkien Chinese is used by the immigrant Chinese community and their descendants. Arabic is mostly used in Muslim prayers and songs and seldom spoken as an everyday vernacular.

=== Education ===
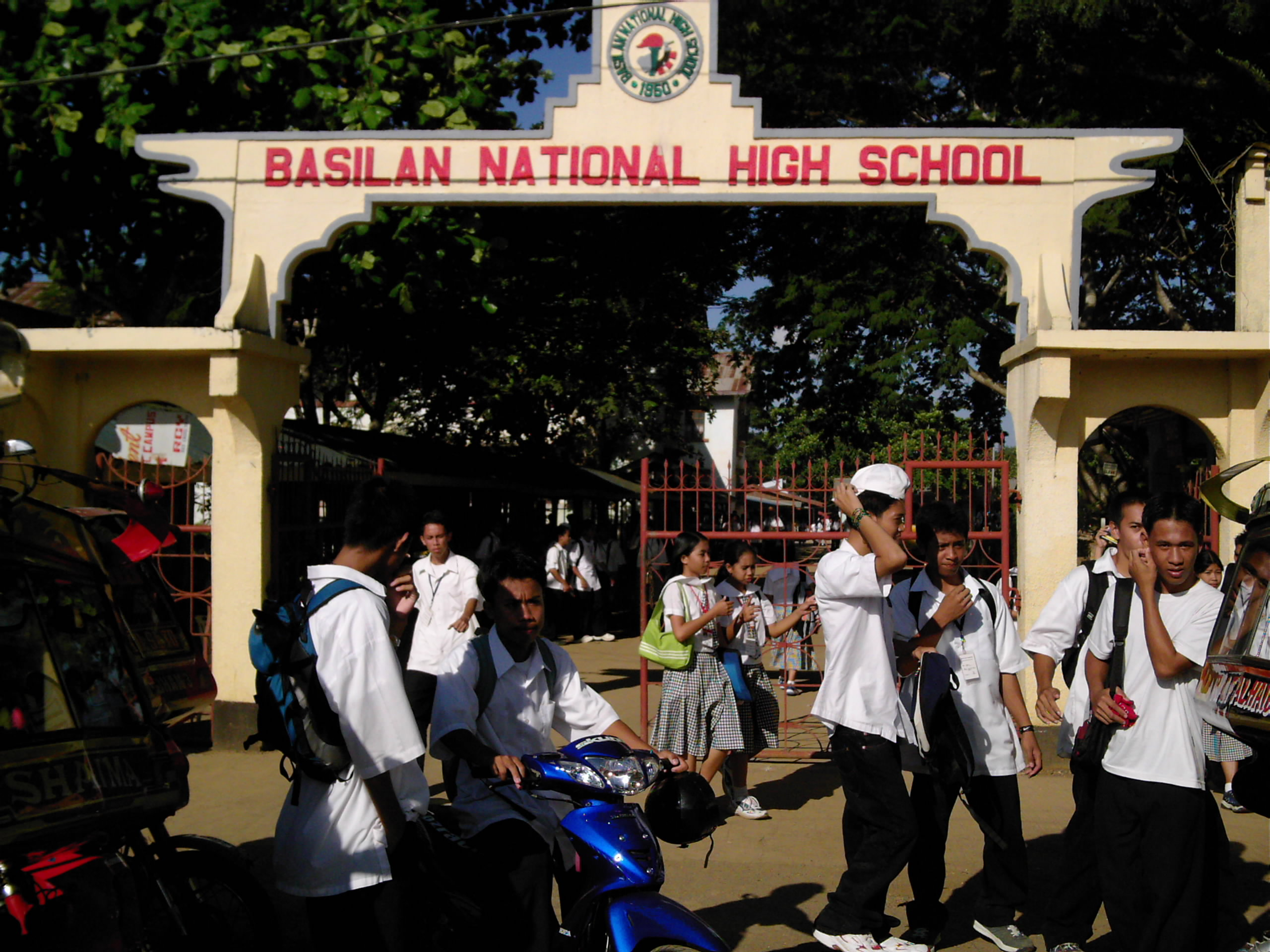
Basilan National High School, Isabela, Basilan's premier secondary institution

Basilan's literacy rate has risen over the past two decades, although it remains one of the Philippines' lowest; 72.23% are considered literate, as opposed to the national figure of 92.6%.

The province has one state university and five private colleges. Basilan State University is located in Isabela and has extension campuses in Lamitan and Maluso. Among the private colleges, there is Computer Technologies Institute-Isabela (est. 1997) and The Mariam School of Nursing in Lamitan (est. 2004).

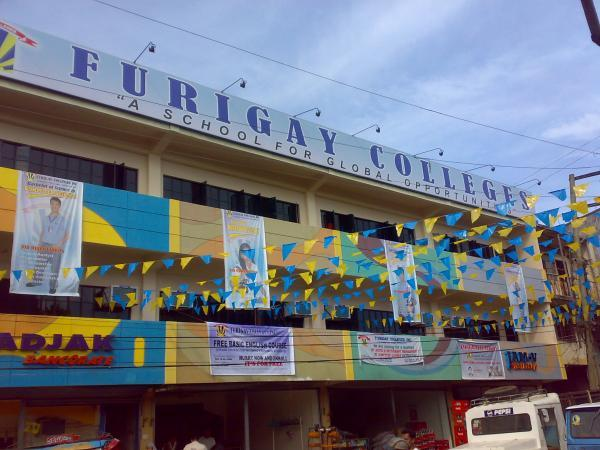
Furigay Colleges, Lamitan City, Basilan

Basilan is served by three school divisions of the Department of Education, one each for Basilan, Isabela, and Lamitan. The first two are headquartered in Isabela City, and the latter is in Lamitan City.

Public and private high schools dot the province. The premier secondary educational institution on the island is Basilan National High School in Isabela, followed by Lamitan National High School in Lamitan. The Claret High Schools of Isabela, Lamitan, Maluso and Tumahubong, and a number of Madaris provide private elementary and secondary instruction. Claret College of Isabela is the only Claretian institution which offers tertiary level education in the Philippines. Other schools offering stand-alone senior high school are Computer Technologies Institute-Isabela and The Mariam School of Nursing, Inc.-Lamitan.

More than 42% of the population five years old and older attended or completed elementary education, 17.3% attended or completed high school, while 1.5% attended or finished post secondary education. Less than 3% possessed academic degrees, while 6.2 percent were college undergraduates. A very small number pursued post-baccalaureate studies. There were more males than females among those who attended or finished elementary (51.1%), high school (50.3%), among college undergraduates (52.0%) and those who took post baccalaureate courses (58.4%). On the other hand, there were more females who attended or completed post-secondary courses (52.9%) and were academic degree holders (52.34%).

=== Clubs and organizations ===
There are clubs and social organizations in Basilan, ranging from the Junior Chamber International Basilan Inc. (Basilan Jaycees) to the Basilan Motor Club.

== Economy ==
Poverty incidence of Basilan (%)

Source: Philippine Statistics Authority

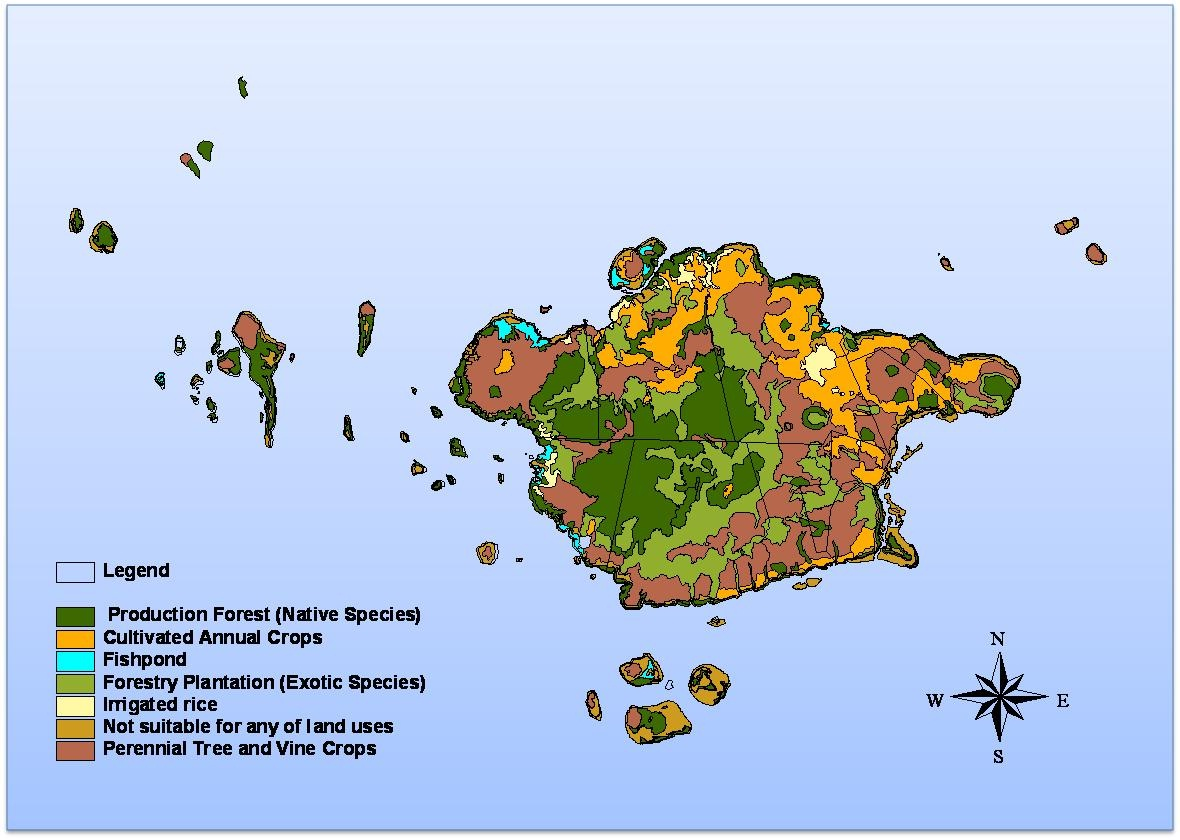
Basilan economic profile

Agriculture is the main source of economic livelihood. Basilan's major products include coconut (primarily copra), rubber, coffee, black pepper, and African palm oil. Other crops are palay, corn, cacao, and cassava.

The Sulu and Celebes Seas provide fish such as tuna, mackerel, and sardines. Most of these are processed in canning factories in nearby Zamboanga City, General Santos (the Philippines' tuna capital), and Navotas. The island's waters also produce grouper, squid, octopus, and marlin, while fishponds supply milkfish, prawn and shrimp. In addition, seaweed is cultivated along some coastal areas.

The island of Omosmarata in Tuburan (now Mohammad Ajul) is listed among only 15 sites in the Philippines with commercially viable ocean thermal energy potential. The Philippines' ocean thermal resource area is 1000 square kilometers, based on the archipelagic nature of the country. Based on a study conducted by the Philippines Department of Energy, the potential capacity for this resource is estimated to be 265 million megawatts.

Likewise, the Basilan Strait is listed among only eight sites in the Philippines with commercially viable ocean tidal energy potential (along with Bohol/Talibon Strait, Basiao Channel, Surigao Strait, Gaboc Channel, Hinatuan Passage, San Bernardino Strait and San Juanico Strait).

Only the provinces of Basilan, Samar and Surigao have both high ocean thermal and ocean tidal energy potential. Basilan likewise has significant as yet underdeveloped mineral deposits, specifically, iron ore, gold, manganese, copper, and coal.

Alienable and disposable lands cover 862.249 square kilometres (332.916 sq mi), forest lands occupy 406.526 square kilometres (156.961 sq mi), 294.194 square kilometres (113.589 sq mi) are underused, 574.85 square kilometres (221.95 sq mi) are under forest cultivation, while 689.479 square kilometres (266.209 sq mi) are under agricultural cultivation.

Local products include woven cloth and trinkets made by the Yakan tribe. Yakans use fibers from plants such as pineapple for their crafts. The weavers traditionally used extracts from leaves, roots and barks to dye their fibers. However, contact with U.S. Peace Corps workers and Christian Filipinos has influenced Yakan textile art. One influence is the introduction of chemical dyes. The museum of Lamitan displays the colorful and intricate traditional Yakan textiles and highlights of the traditional Yakan festival of Lami-lamihan.

=== Early history ===
Basilan's economy has seen wild upswings and downturns over the course of several centuries. Pre-Hispanic Taguima had an economy based on basic subsistence agriculture, mostly root crops. Ancient Chinese texts point to the existence of a "Kingdom of Kumalarang", which presumably was located on the island's northwestern shore, and which occasionally traded with Chinese merchants plying the route to the Spice Islands of the Moluccas and Borneo farther south.

When the Spanish arrived, other crops such as rice and corn were introduced and cultivated, primarily for consumption by the growing Christian settlements of Isabela and Lamitan. Trade with Zamboanga grew tremendously, as most of the settlers' needs were supplied by regular shipments from the busy Zamboanga port.

=== Multinational plantations ===
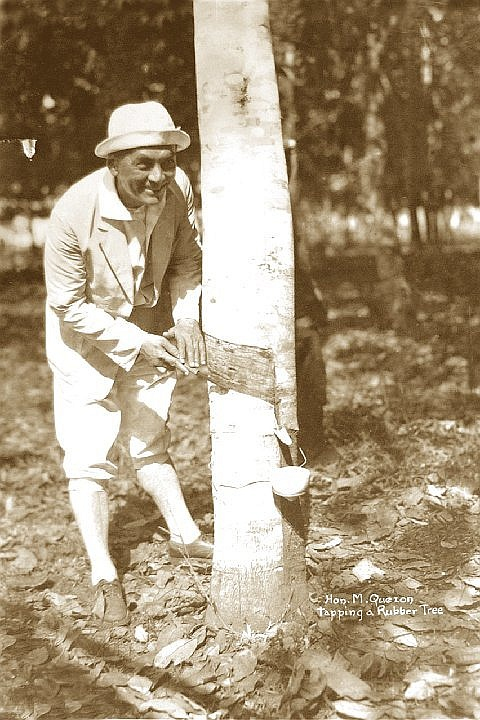
President Manuel Quezon tapping the sap of one of the trees in the pioneering Basilan rubber plantations developed by American Dr. James W. Strong.

When the United States assumed control of the Philippines after its victory in the Spanish–American War, it brought about the single biggest change in the local economy. By around 1914, Dr. James W. Strong, a pioneering American plantation owner, cleared vast tracts of land on the island's northern plains (Isabela/Lamitan), and established what became the Philippines' first commercial rubber plantation—the American Rubber Co. Upon consulting with Fr. Zamora, a noted botanist of the University of Santo Tomas in Manila, he decided to start experimenting with rubber plants and in 1910, forming the Basilan Rubber Plantation in partnership with J.M. Menzi Corporation as principal stock holders. Seven years later, he sold out his interest to J.M. Menzi Corporation and started American Rubber Co. backed by San Francisco capital. He started building roads in Basilan with the help of his children. Those roads are now part of the National Highway system in Basilan.

The family and plantation prospered and was visited by such notables as Manuel L. Quezon, President of the Commonwealth of the Philippines, his vice-president Sergio Osmeña, General Douglas MacArthur and assorted Governor Generals and High Commissioners for the Philippines.

The 913-hectare plantation was eventually sold to American multi-national B. F. Goodrich through its local subsidiary American Rubber Plantation Corp. This was followed by investments from British-Malayan firm Sime Darby Corp., which opened their 1,651 hectares (4,080 acres) rubber plantation on the island's southern slopes (Sumisip/Tipo-Tipo).

The success of these large-scale cash crop plantations was emulated by a number of enterprising Filipinos and Spanish-mestizo families from Zamboanga, Negros and Luzon. Among these were Don Juan S. Alano, a Hispano-Chinese mestizo and native of Malolos, Bulacan, who opened the Philippine National Sugar Co. on Malamawi Island in 1921. This eventually became the Basilan Estates, Inc., the only 100% Filipino-owned plantation competing with American and British multinationals. It operated the Malamawi Island plantation, which was converted to coconut/copra production, and opened a 1,434-hectare copra plantation on the island's western plains (Tairan, Lantawan), Basilan's third-largest plantation in land area. American logging firms Weyerhaeuser Timber Co. and the American Lumber Co. opened large-scale logging concessions which operated in Basilan's extensive upland virgin forest. Menzi Agricultural Corporation, owned by the Swiss merchant Johannes Melchior Menzi, opened a 991-hectare rubber plantation in the southern part of Isabela which eventually expanded to black pepper and palm oil.

The University of the Philippines System was awarded a huge 4,018-hectare land grant by the Philippine government, in Santa Clara, Lamitan. This was eventually taken over by the Marcos-era National Development Corporation.

When Johannes Melchior Menzi died, he was succeeded at the helm of his substantial business interests by his son and Marcos crony, Hans Menzi. When the younger Menzi replaced the plantation's Swiss-expatriate managers with locals, these managers in turn opened up their own plantations elsewhere on the island. Arnold Winniger, Menzi's Swiss manager, together with the Cuevas-Pamaran-Antonio-Flores clan of Lamitan, cleared the Tumahubong, Sumisip area with their 316-hectare Siltown Realty Corp. Walter Boelsterli, another one of Menzi's Swiss recruits, established the 969-hectare Eurasia Match Inc. plantation around Mangal, Sumisip. An American corporation opened the 1,127-hectare Yakan Plantation in Lamitan. This was eventually sold to JAKA Holdings of Marcos-era Defense Minister and later senator Juan Ponce Enrile. Finally, Dutch-American Donald Wieselski opened another 569-hectare coconut plantation in the Canas, Maluso area. This too was sold off to Eustaquio D. Tan & Sons, Inc. The Wihara Plantation, a Japanese company, opened in the Atong-Atong, Lantawan region. This became the source of many of the coconut varieties planted throughout the island.

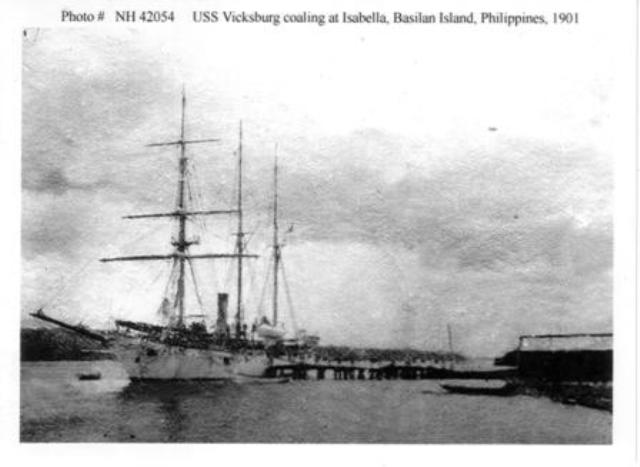
USS Vicksburg coaling at the Isabela Wharf, Basilan. Photo taken from the vantage point of the "floating" Naval Hospital, 1901.

By the 1950s and throughout the 1960s, the Chartered City of Basilan, fourth-biggest in the Philippines in terms of land area (after Davao, Puerto Princesa and Zamboanga), was classified as a first-class city. It exported copra, coconut oil, rubber and lumber to California by way of Guam and Hawaii.

A substantial number of expatriate plantation managers, mostly Americans but also Swiss, Germans, Dutch, Russian, Japanese, Irish, and Swedes lived among and intermarried into the native populace.

The Weyerhaeuser Compound (now Tabuk Barangay) was an exclusive gated community for American expatriates living in Basilan. It had its own airstrip and wharf, and two-storey plantation-style villas set apart by expansive yards. The same sort of exclusive gated communities were put up at the Menzi Compound (Menzi Barangay) for Swiss and German managers, and at the Alano Compound (Dna. Ramona T. Alano Barangay) as well, precursors of modern-day subdivisions and exclusive gated communities in the Philippines.

=== The Moro uprising ===
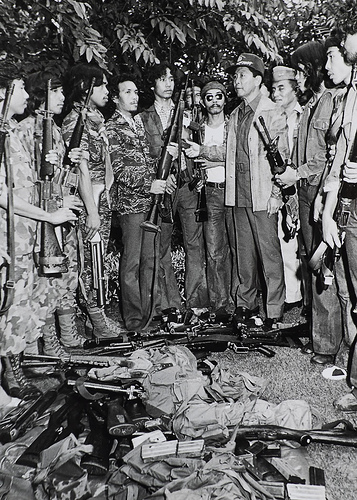
MNLF fighters surrender their firearms to President Ferdinand Marcos.

The Moro uprising of 1971 affected Basilan's economy. It was led by Moro National Liberation Front (MNLF) originating from Sulu, headed by University of the Philippines lecturer Nur Misuari. This was compounded by the declaration of martial law by President Ferdinand Marcos in 1972, and the decree that created Basilan Province, with its initial complement of ten municipalities (eventually reduced to seven).

Politics took center stage, and the resurgent Yakan uplanders found themselves battling the Tausug lowlanders and their allies. The incessant Yakan-Tausug pocket battles throughout the 1980s culminated in the burning of Isabela City's downtown market in 1987. After several revenge killings, Basilan gained notoriety as the Philippines' "Wild, Wild West". By then, Basilan's economy, along with that of the rest of the nation, was limping along, barely surviving the aftermath of these struggles.

=== Comprehensive Agrarian Reform Program and the rise of Abu Sayyaf ===
Following the 1986 People Power Revolution that deposed Marcos and installed Corazon Aquino, another blow was dealt to Basilan's economy. In 1988, Congress passed a law establishing the Comprehensive Agrarian Reform Program (CARP), which inaugurated a land distribution program, effectively dissolving nearly all of the corporate plantations on the island. CARP applied to Basilan's large multi-national plantations despite the plantation workers' misgivings and the landowners' objections. Almost immediately, the large multi-national corporations withdrew their investments from Basilan, leaving their plantations to ill-equipped farmer beneficiaries, who managed operations in a farmers cooperative format.

The J. S. Alano coconut plantation was converted into the Tairan Agrarian Reform Beneficiaries Association and Multi-Purpose Cooperative (TARBAMC), the University of the Philippines Basilan Land Grant into the Santa Clara Agrarian Reform Beneficiaries Integrated Development Cooperative (SCARBIDC), and the American Rubber (B.F. Goodrich) rubber plantation was converted into the Latuan Agrarian Reform Beneficiaries Association Inc. (LARBAI). The vast tracts of the Enrile-owned Cocoland Plantation, was redistributed as the Lamitan Agrarian Reform Beneficiaries Cooperative (LARBECO). A number of other Agrarian Reform Beneficiaries Cooperatives have likewise taken over most of the small to mid-sized plantations on the island.

The Philippine government's initial rapprochement with the Misuari-led Moro National Liberation Front throughout the 1980s established the 7,281-hectare Basilan Resettlement Area which was set aside for MNLF rebel-returnees and their communities located on the western slopes of Basilan Peak, mostly in northern Sumisip, but also in southern Isabela, and northeastern Maluso. This vast area was eventually subdivided into four Agrarian Reform Cooperatives, all of which were established in 1991.

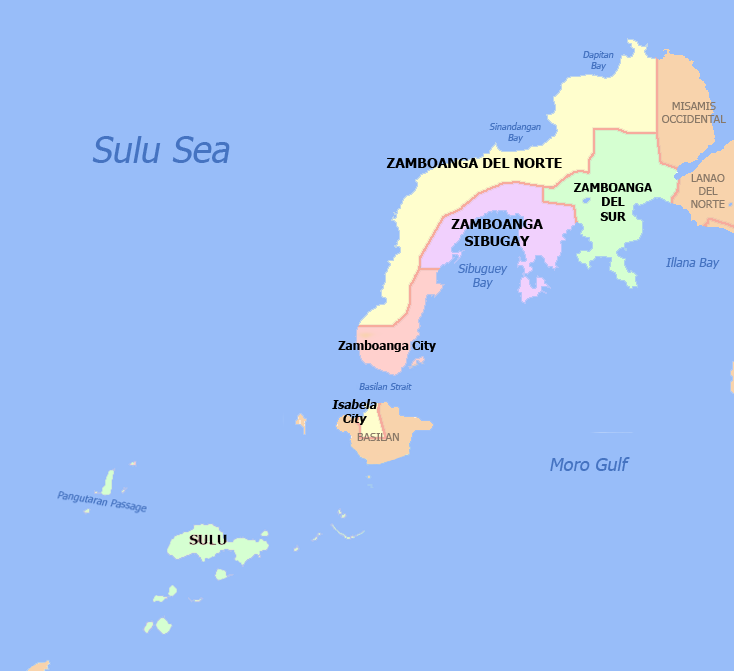
Political map of Zamboanga Peninsula

By the early 1990s, disgruntled youth, influenced by returning mujahideen warriors from the thwarted Soviet invasion of Afghanistan and schooled in more radical schools of thought in Syria, Egypt, and Pakistan, banded together to form the Al-Harakatul Al-Islamiyah, better known as Abu Sayyaf, an extremist group advocating strict Islamic governance similar to Afghanistan's Taliban. This group initiated test raids, kidnappings, ambushes and assassinations in some of the most vulnerable communities inland, causing the dispersal of these communities and total breakdown of the inland economy.

As more and more of the group's pioneering leaders were captured or gunned down, the group gradually transformed from being radical ideologues to becoming plain lawless elements or bandits, prone to committing heinous crimes, usually kidnapping for ransom and bombings throughout Mindanao, Palawan (Dos Palmas) and even Malaysia (Sipadan Island).

The group's founding leader, the radical firebrand Abdurajak Janjalani of Isabela City, is a typical product of Basilan's closely mixed ethnicities and inter-marriages: he is part-Tausug, part-Yakan and part-Ilonggo.

=== Inclusion in the Autonomous Region in Muslim Mindanao ===
The Organic Act for the creation of the Autonomous Region in Muslim Mindanao (ARMM) was passed into law in 1989. A plebiscite held in 14 Mindanao provinces was held in the same year. Basilan initially opted out of the autonomous region. Only Maguindanao (without Cotabato City), Lanao del Sur (without Marawi City), Sulu and Tawi-Tawi joined the ARMM.

More than a decade later, in 2001, a new law expanding the ARMM was passed, and a plebiscite was subsequently held. While Basilan's five Muslim municipalities (Maluso, Sumisip, Lantawan, Tipo-Tipo, Tuburan) opted to join the expanded ARMM, residents of the Christian areas of Isabela City and Lamitan Municipality, chose not to. Even then, only Isabela was not included in the expanded ARMM, having been granted cityhood earlier in the same year. Lamitan joined the five other municipalities, as Basilan was officially incorporated into the expanded ARMM.

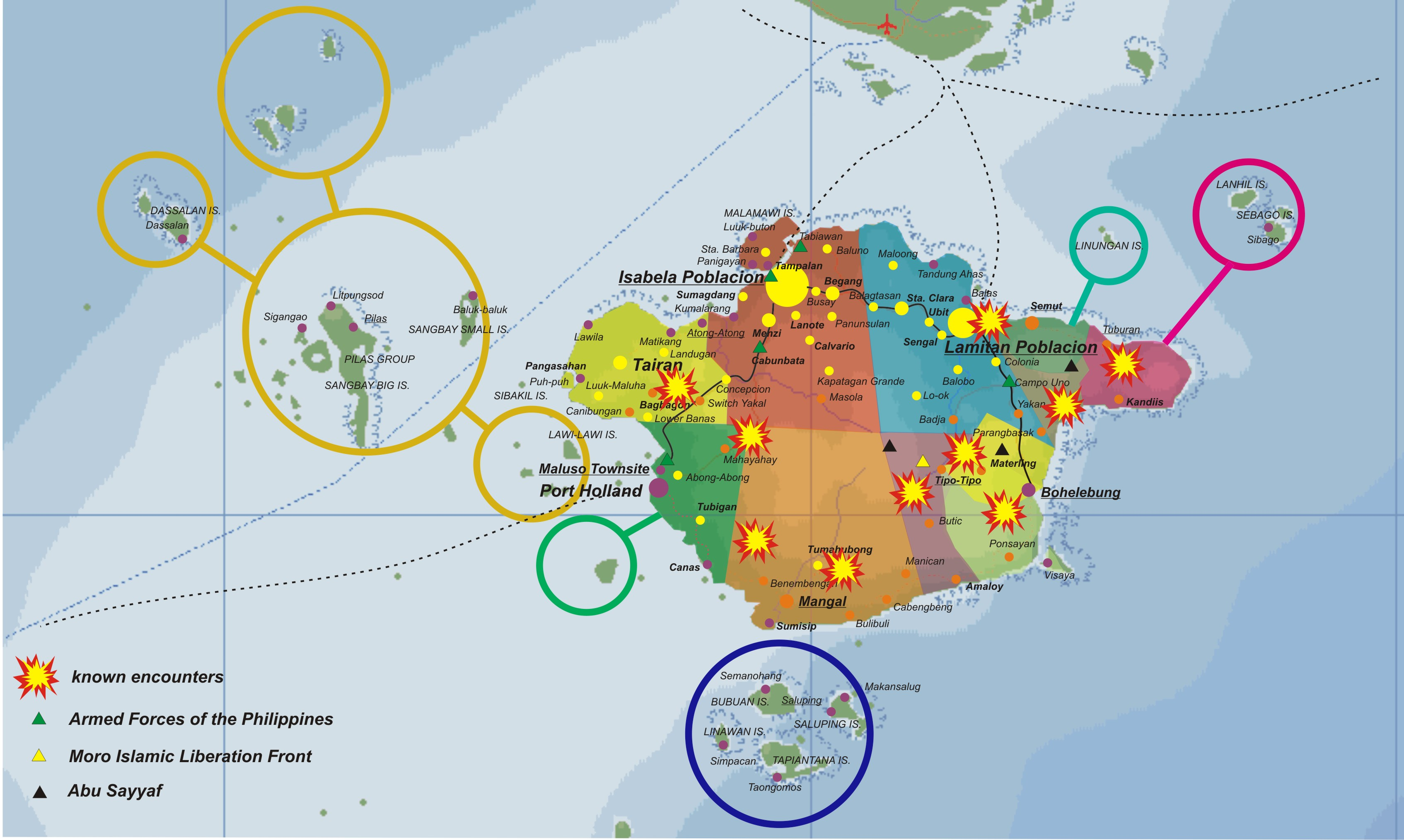
Basilan security profile

Widespread corruption in the ARMM, compounded by corruption at the municipal and provincial levels, further eroded business confidence in the island. This, plus the surge of terrorist activities carried out by Abu Sayyaf and their Jemaah Islamiyah cohorts in the international terrorist network of Al-Qaeda, weakened Basilan's economy further.

The hostage crisis of 2001 further raised questions about Basilan's economic future. Operations by Abu Sayyaf damaged prospects for investment and tourism. However, an increased presence by the Philippine and US militaries through the Balikatan 02-1 Joint Military Exercises and the subsequent death of Abu Sayyaf leaders Khadaffi Abubakar Janjalani and Aldam Tilao (kunya: Abu Sabaya), were followed by investments by the United States through USAID. Projects include the Basilan Tuburan Road Improvement Project and improvements to Lamitan and Maluso Ports. Smaller barangay infrastructure projects, intended to help boost economic growth, are also under development. For instance, authorities are building farm-to-market roads, community and trade centers, water projects, and pedestrian bridges, according to USAID information.

A number of other ODA-funded Non-Government Organizations (NGOs) and People's Organizations (POs) flooded Basilan starting in 2002. These NGOs and POs provided much-needed capital infusion for local entrepreneurs to restart defunct or dying business enterprises. Likewise, improved training and government-funded support were extended to decade-old Agrarian Reform Beneficiaries Cooperatives, effectively improving productivity levels and crop yields. Extensive farm management training in these "Coop" areas have likewise improved business efficiency in the cooperatives.

Currently, Basilan's minimum wage is US$3.20/day for non-agriculture related jobs, and US$2.80/day for agriculture related jobs. There are only 1,203 registered Overseas Filipino Workers from Basilan.

=== Return of rubber ===
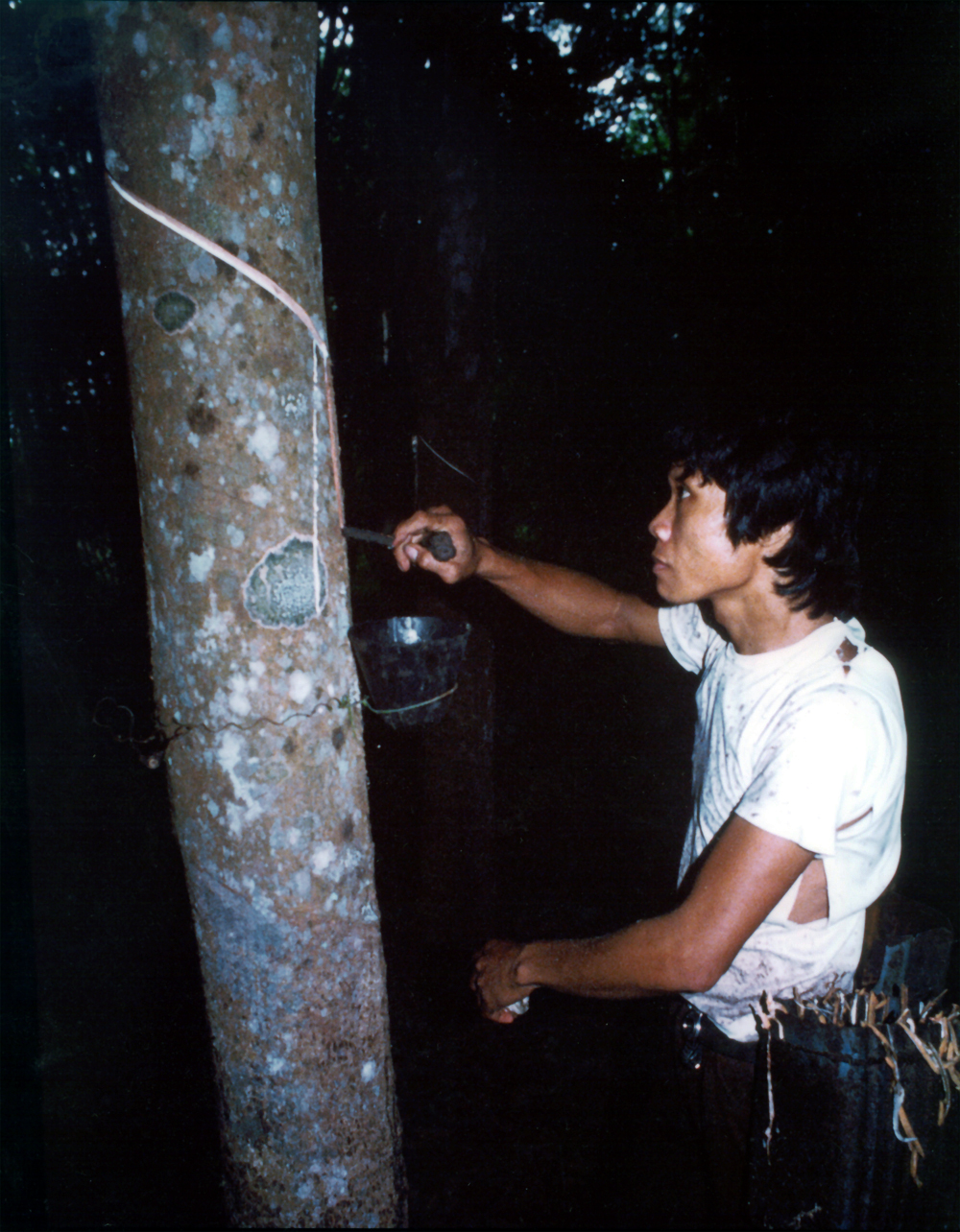
Worker in a rubber producing plantation.

By 2003, Basilan embarked on large-scale replanting programs covering some 50,000 hectares (120,000 acres) of privately owned and/or cooperative-controlled lands, mainly for rubber and cassava. As of 2006, the province had 15,503 hectares (38,310 acres) planted, of which 7,148 hectares (17,660 acres) were owned by individual farmers and the rest by cooperatives. The exact land area devoted to rubber could reach over 20,000 hectares (49,000 acres), as there are hundreds of unrecorded small rubber growers and farmers. The provincial government reports that almost half or 7,029.47 hectares (17,370.2 acres) are immature, about a fifth or 3,143.36 hectares (7,767.4 acres) is classed as "less-productive", and a little under a third or 4,880.21 hectares (12,059.3 acres) is described as "productive".

A consortium of agrarian reform beneficiaries has been formed to improve quality and increase production. The Isla Corridor Consortium Agrarian Reform Communities not only sees itself as reviving the rubber industry, it also wants to help in the transformation of the battle-scarred province. The consortium, composed of the United Workers Agrarian Reform Beneficiaries Multipurpose Cooperative, Lamitan Agrarian Reform Beneficiaries Cooperative, Santa Clara, and the Latuan Agrarian Reform Beneficiaries Association, Inc., accounts for a total area of about 6,000 hectares (15,000 acres), some 80% of which is planted with rubber trees.

=== Coconut ===
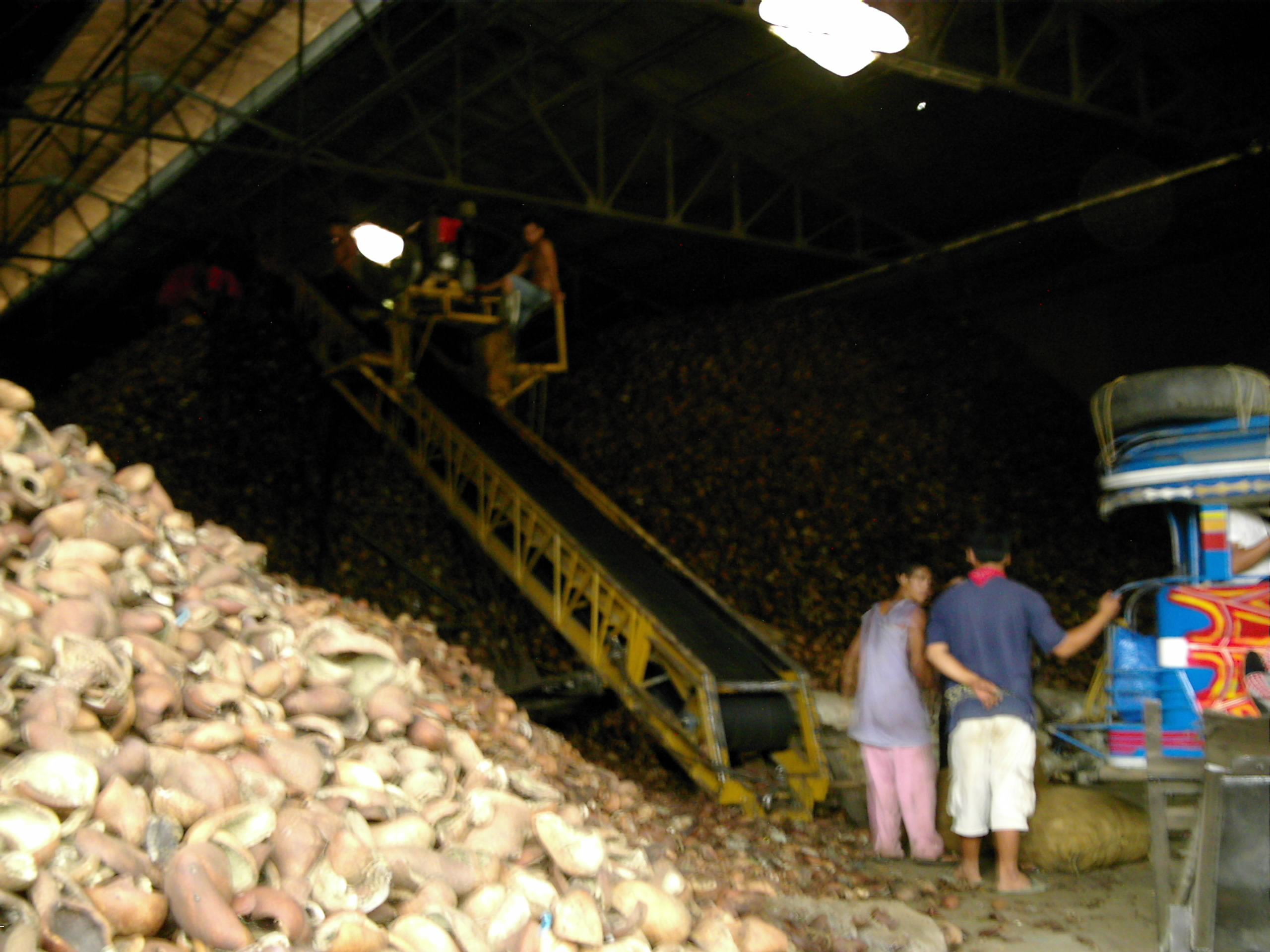
Copra processing plant in Isabela City, Basilan

Although it is still the biggest single crop produced in the province, coconut/copra production annually was only 193,848 metric tons in 2003, down from its peak production of 189,297,937 metric tons just two years before. Coconut plantations and small coconut farms cover more than 12,000 hectares (30,000 acres), all of which are classified as "productive" to "mature" areas. However, province-wide coconut production, which still accounts for 50%-60% of the province's total economic activity, has dropped precipitously to only 174,939 metric tons in 2002 due to the lingering effects of CARP, combined with a severe onset of the El Niño weather pattern, the worsening threat to peace and order resulting from the resurgent Abu Sayyaf terrorist group and their MILF allies, and the policy of the Akbar administration to replace coconut with rubber trees.

Coconut plantations began to revive in 2006, owing to the steep rise in copra prices. A comprehensive replanting and rehabilitation program is currently being implemented by the Philippine Coconut Authority (PCA) and the Department of Agriculture for the resuscitation of the island's copra production industry, once the Philippine's second-largest copra exporter after Quezon Province in Luzon. To date, however, coconut production in the province, rapidly being replaced by rubber plantations, has remained in the doldrums despite the government's best efforts to revive the ailing sector, such as PCA incentives to coconut farmers.

=== Other products ===
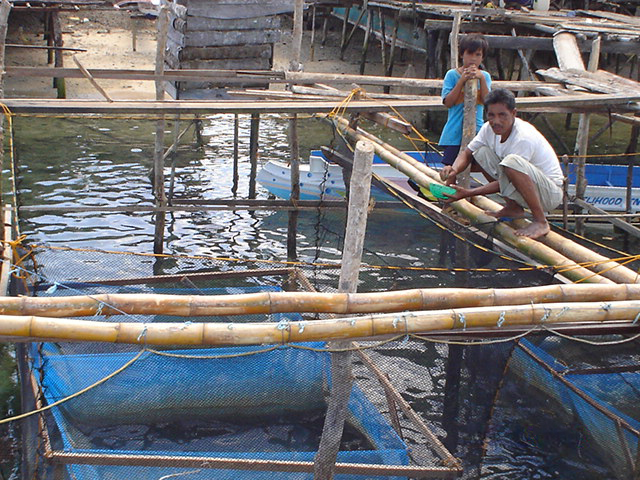
Samal fishers engaged in lobster culture, a project of USAID GEM on Malamawi Island, Isabela City.

Basilan's extensive coastline hosts seafarers and fishers, almost all of them Tausugs, Samals and Bajaus, who have been engaged in fishing for several centuries. Annual Basilan fish production is limited to 28,073 metric tons due to resistance to the modernizing of their fishing fleets.

Only 2,945 metric tons of palay (rice) are produced in Basilan's mostly rolling terrain. Corn production is 1,333 metric tons, bananas 20,458 metric tons, and mangos 211 metric tons.

There are 155,541 chickens, 5,085 ducks, 7,803 carabaos (water buffalo), 2,724 cattle, 14,470 goats, and 14,700 hogs.

=== Banking and finance ===
Banks based in Basilan have a total deposit base of more than Php764,500,000. The city hosts at least 27 pawnshop operations, each of whom has an average of three branches, mostly located in Isabela City, Lamitan, and Maluso Townsite.

The province is also serviced by satellite offices of government financing institutions such as the Social Security System and the Government Service Insurance System.

The Basilan business sector is represented by the Philippine Chamber of Commerce and Industry-Basilan Chamber (PCCI-Basilan), organized in 1975, the only business support organization duly affiliated with the Philippine Chamber of Commerce and Industry (PCCI), with 95% of its members being composed of small and medium enterprises, and offices mostly in Isabela City and Lamitan, but with business assets and operations throughout the island. A number of smaller business groups have since been established catering to the needs of businessmen from specific ethnic or religious affiliations.

=== Utilities, infrastructure, and health ===
Basilan's electricity needs are served by the Basilan Electric Cooperative, powered by three diesel-powered electricity generating plants located at Barangay Binuangan, Isabela, one National Power Corporation diesel-powered barge located at Barangay Tabuk, Isabela, and two mini-hydroelectric plants located in Kumalarang, Isabela and Balagtasan, Lamitan. A total of 62 sitios, in 42 barangays spread out in 6 municipalities still do not have access to electricity. Only about 38% of Barangays are sufficiently powered for modern needs, and most of these are located in the cities of Isabela and Lamitan, and Maluso Municipality. Rates are currently pegged at US$0.824/kwH (Php11.42/kwH), one of the highest in the country. Basilan has a total electricity demand of 8.8MW (peak hours), and has a total reliable electricity supply of only 7.4MW, thus resulting in one of the country's longest intermittent blackout spells, running for several years now.

Basilan is served by three local water utilities: Isabela City Water District, Lamitan City Water District, and Maluso Water District. Only 17,693 households, however, have full access to safe and potable water. Current rates are pegged at an average US$3.20/month (+US$0.0826/10 cu.m.)

The island is served by the Provincial Telephone System, which has 600 land-line connections and connected with National Direct Dial via the Philippine Long Distance Telephone Company. It is also served by major mobile telecommunications carriers Globe Telecommunications and Smart Communications. It has two WiFi internet service providers, and numerous internet cafés.

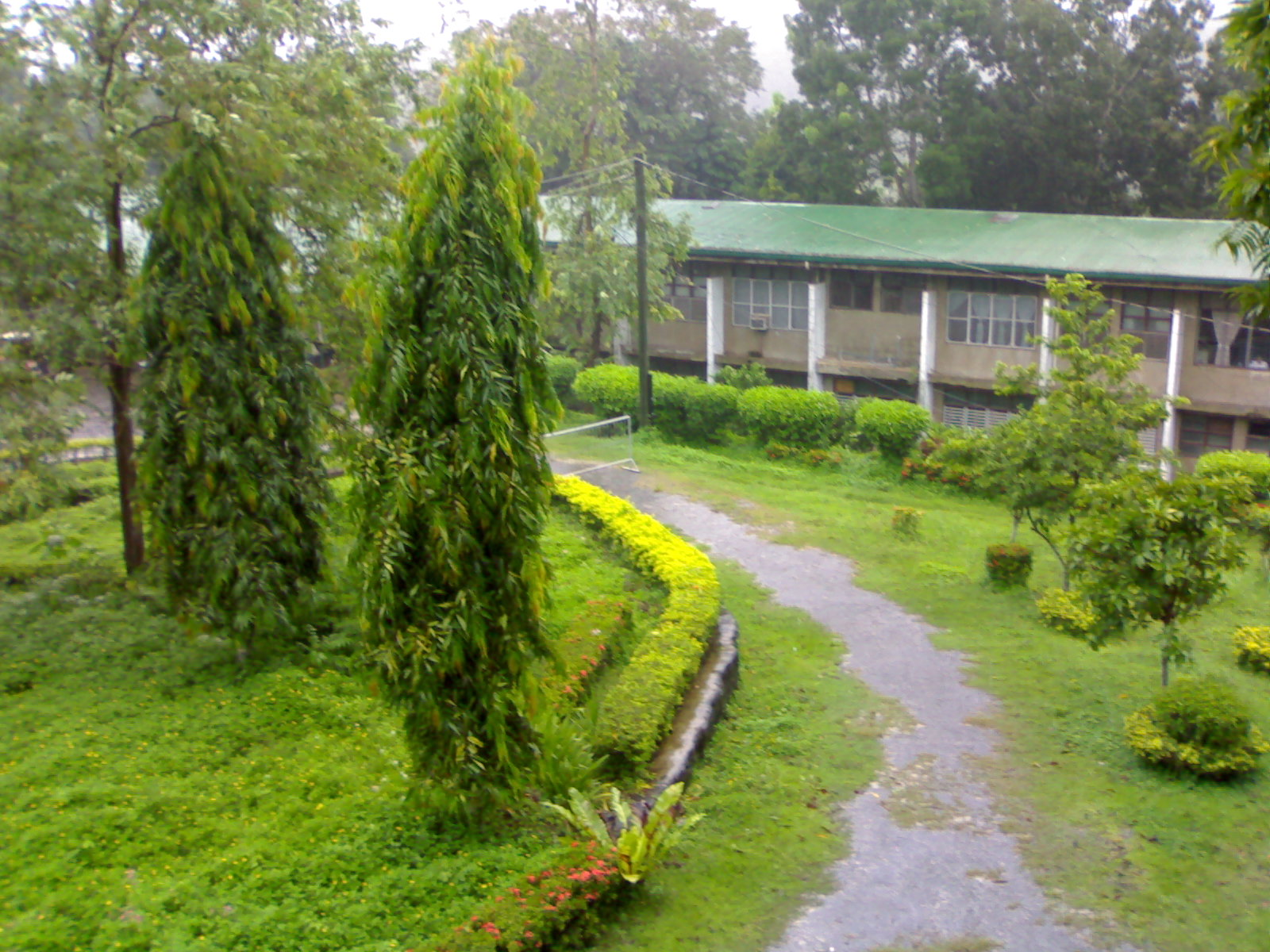
Juan S. Alano Memorial Hospital, Inc. (formerly Basilan Hospital), the first private hospital in Basilan opened in 1953.

National roads (concrete, asphalt, gravel) total 131.92 kilometres (81.97 mi), while there are 795.8 kilometres (494.5 mi) of local roads. There are 13 municipal and local ports, three of which have roll-on/roll-off capability, and at least ten private airstrips servicing small aircraft. Major bridges are the Marcos Bridge of Isabela and the recently inaugurated Matarling Bridge (built through USAID funding) between Isabela and Lantawan.

There are 394 Barangay Health Workers and four private hospitals: the Juan S. Alano Memorial Hospital (formerly Basilan Hospital), Infante Hospital, Basilan Community Hospital, all in Isabela, and the Dr. Jose Ma. Torres Hospital in Lamitan. There are also four government-run hospitals: Basilan General Hospital and Isabela City Infirmary, both located in Isabela City, the Lamitan District Hospital in Lamitan City, and the Sumisip District Hospital in Luuk-Bait, Sumisip Municipality.

== Tourism ==
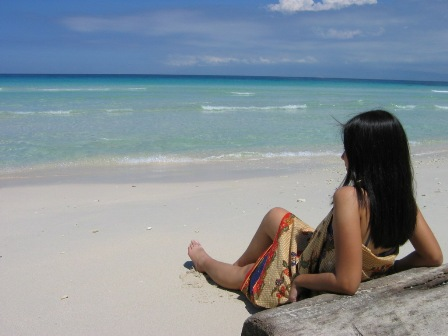
Alano White Beach Resort, Malamawi Island, Isabela City, Basilan

Architectural landmarks includeSanta Isabel Cathedral, Calvario Peak, on which the Chapel of Peace stands, and Kaum Purnah Mosque. Natural attractions include the lake in the Panigayan fishing village, Sumagdang Beach and the waterfalls of the Kumalarang River. Cultures can be visited, such as the Badjao, the Yakan, and the Muslim communities.

=== Churches and religious shrines ===
- Chapel of Peace, Calvario Peak, Isabela, perched 400 metres (1,300 ft) above sea level and 15 minutes from the town proper.
- Santa Isabel Cathedral, Isabela, an art deco cathedral with a mosaic altar reminiscent of Roman-Byzantine cathedrals, named for the patron saint of Isabela.
- Monte Santo Shrine, atop Mount Ubit in Lamitan, is a pilgrimage site for devout Catholics who visit the shrine for the Stations of the Cross during Holy Week.
- Kaum Purnah Mosque, Isabela, an old and imposing mosque, the sight of which greets visitors on ferries as they sail the channel into Isabela.

=== Historical sites ===
- Datu Kalun Shrine, Lamitan. Built as a tribute to a famous Yakan leader, it is a triangular park located in the heart of Lamitan City's bustling downtown. His descendants include the prominent Cuevas-Pamaran-Antonio clan.
- Museo ng Lamitan, which showcases the Lami-Lamihan festival. It also serves as the information center for Lamitan.

Old Basilan Provincial Capitol, former site of Fort Isabela Segunda

- Old Basilan Provincial Capitol, site of Fort Isabela II. The original fort was bombed and destroyed towards the end of World War II, having been used by the occupying Japanese forces as a munitions dump. A newer Capitol Building was built on the spot where the old Basilan City Hall stood after it was burned in the early 1990s. The new building is a celebration of Muslim and Christian influences which shaped modern-day Basilan, and still occupies the highest point of the city proper.
- Isabela City Plaza (formerly Plaza Misericordia) Plaza Rizal. The twin plazas of the city have remained at the very center of Basilan's socio-political scene to this very day.

=== Fiestas and festivals ===
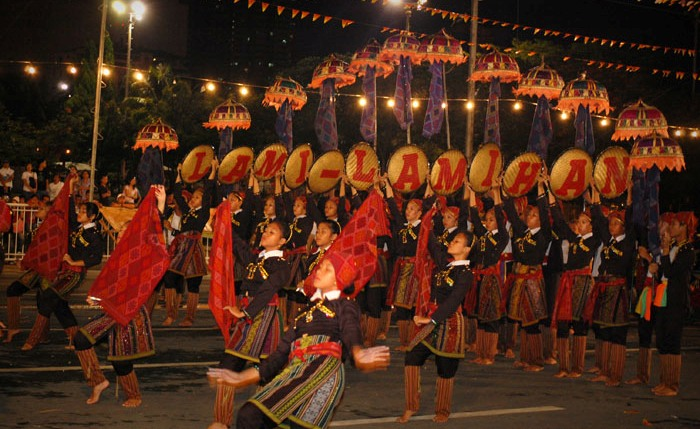
Lami-Lamihan Festival, Lamitan, Basilan

- Pakaradjaan Basilan, celebrated annually from March 1 to 7 to commemorate the founding anniversary of the Province of Basilan.
- Lami-Lamihan Festival, the island's premier festival, is held on the Feast of Saints Peter and Paul on June 29 in Lamitan City. The festival is highlighted by the Yakans, who attend in full regalia, selling wares and produce brought in from their farms in the interior.
- Cocowayan Festival, Isabela's annual commemoration of its cityhood, is a week-long series of activities culminating in the annual Street Dancing parade on April 25.
- Fiesta Santa Isabel, celebrated every July 8 by the residents of Isabela, in honor of its patroness, Elizabeth of Portugal. The focal point of the celebrations is the Santa Isabel Cathedral in the center of Isabela City. This is highlighted by a procession and novena masses, the traditional Bella Isabela Beauty Pageant, a marathon, a regatta and other activities organized primarily by the Diocese of Basilan and the Prelature of Isabela and its lay organizations, the Catholic Women's League and the Knights of Columbus.
- Semana Santa (Holy Week), celebrated in March/April (movable). A city procession known as the Santo Entierro (Holy Funeral) on Good Friday highlights the observance of Lent. Celebrated in most parish churches in the city and in Santa Isabel Cathedral, the Santo Entierro procession of religious images, many of the Stations of the Cross along the city's main streets, depicting his last hours before, during, and after the Crucifixion.
- Flores de Mayo (May 1–31). A religious feast in honor of the Blessed Virgin Mary. Little children in white dresses walk up the altar to offer flowers to an image of the Virgin Mary.
- Fonda de Barangay or Fiestas del Barangay, a week-long celebration in the barangays/barrios honoring their patron saints. The celebration usually starts with novena masses held every day for nine straight days before the feast day of the patron saint. Every night, the barrio is lit up for celebration and merry-making that includes pageants, trade fair, parade, cock-fighting, carnival, musical competition and baile.
- Budbud Festival, a barangay fiesta in honor of Our Lady of Regla of Begang, otherwise known as Isabela's "Little Cebu", as a majority of whose residents originated from Carmen, Cebu. The festival consists of several days of beauty pageants, street dancing, "budbud" (rice cake) eating and much merrymaking.
- Pascua (Christmas), the December 25 celebration of Jesus Christ's birth. City hall, churches, schools, streetlight post, houses, streets, commercial places, parks and most of the other places in the city are covered with lights, filled with joyous sounds and other Christmas decorations.
- Isra' w' al-Mi'raj (May 9), an Islamic celebration of the nocturnal journey and ascension of Muhammad to Heaven.
- Eid al-Fitr/Hari Raya Puasa (movable), an Islamic festival marking the end of the fasting month of Ramadan.
- Mawlid un-Nabi (December 27), an Islamic celebration honoring the birthday of Muhammad.
- Chinese New Year, celebrated every February (movable) mostly for noisemaking, tikoy eating contests, and the much-anticipated giving of ang pao by elders.

== Government ==
Basilan Provincial Capitol

Basilan's politics has been dictated by its economics. Whereas only 33% of the island's residents originate from Christian groups in the Visayas and Luzon, this group owns 70% of the island's developed arable agricultural land (private ownership or cooperatives as farmer beneficiaries). The Yakan tribe, comprising 41% of the island's population, has full control of local governments outside of Isabela and Lamitan. The Tausug, Samal and Bajau form 25% of the population, control nearly 90% of the island's aquatic harvest, while the minuscule Chinese segment of the population controls nearly 100% of all commodity trading and commerce activities, especially in the bigger cities.

This volatile mix of ethnic and religious groups have defined political realignments in the island for most of its history. The Christian tribes, traditionally allied with the Tausug, controlled Basilan politics until the 1980s, when the Yakan, aided by their almost absolute control of the hinterlands and the disappearance of the multi-national plantations, scored upset victories in electoral contests starting in 1988.

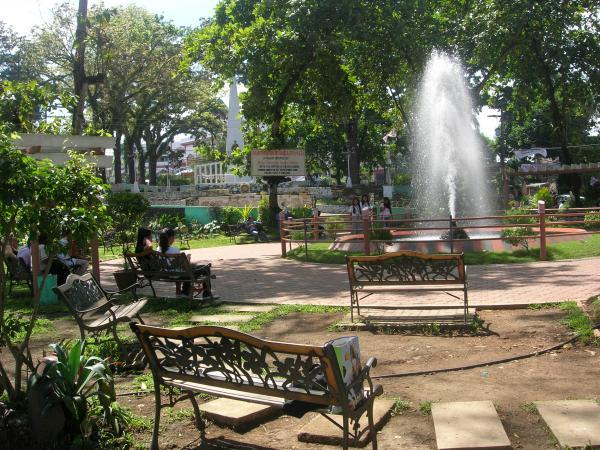
Present-day Isabela City Plaza (formerly Plaza Misericordia; note the Rizal monument and Plaza Rizal in the background)

This political combine has since seen some in-fighting from two of the most formidable power blocks to have formed since the 2004 general elections. Both blocks went head-to-head in the 2007, 2010 and 2013 local elections with mixed results.

The Akbar block (Liberal Party - Atienza Wing & Lakas-CMD/Kampi) was led by the late Wahab Akbar, three-term Basilan governor and clan patriarch, together with his wives, and his nephews and nieces, all of whom won mayoral posts in all the municipalities as well as Isabela City, which is under his second wife Cherrylyn Santos-Akbar. Hja. Jum Jainuddin-Akbar, the incumbent three-term Governor of Basilan assumed the leadership of the block after Wahab Akbar himself, who was elected congressman in 2007, was assassinated in November 13 of that year. Cases were filed against Gerry Salapuddin ang Mujiv Hataman, having been accused of having master-minded the assassination. The 2013 Elections proved the staying power of the Akbars as the clan, celebrating the twin victories of both Governor Jum and Mayor Cherry, heralded the election of Alfiya Akbar-Fernandez, eldest daughter of Gov. Akbar, as the top-notcher Provincial Board Member for District 1, and Al Qaid Akbar, eldest son, who won as Isabela City Councilor. The Akbars won all of their electoral contests since 1998. Gov. Jum Akbar won in all Cities and Municipalities in Basilan, except Hdji. Muhtamad (Pilas) in the last election, with an electoral landslide of over 60,000 votes against her only opponent. This is her third and final term as governor. Mayor Cherry Santos-Akbar likewise won handily in Isabela for a third and final term in that City.

The Hataman block (Liberal Party) - Roxas/Aquino Wing) is led by Mujiv Hataman, elected Regional Governor of the Autonomous Region in Muslim Mindanao (ARMM) in 2013, a close friend and ally of Philippine President Benigno Simeon Aquino III. He is joined by his brother, Rep. Hajiman Hataman-Salliman, Congressman of the Lone District of Basilan, and his wife, Sitti Djalia Turabin-Hataman who won a seat as a Party-list representative in Congress, representing Anak Mindanao Party-list. They are joined by a number of clan members who likewise won local positions, especially in their bailiwick of Sumisip Municipality in Basilan. The Hatamans can boast of a mixed bag of electoral victories and defeats since 2004. Mujiv Hataman is in his first term as Regional Governor of ARMM, Cong. Jim Salliman is on his second term as Representative, and Cong. Sitti Djalia Hataman is on her first.

The Salapuddin block (Lakas-CMD/Kampi) is led by Abdulgani "Gerry" Salapuddin, three-term governor, three-term congressman and two-term Deputy Speaker of the House of Representatives. To him, the 2007, 2010 and 2013 elections proved to be a débâcle, as he and his daughter - Rabia Salapuddin (who ran for governor in 2013) lost on all fronts. The Salapuddins have lost all elections since 2007.

The Akbars and Hatamans forged a political alliance in 2012, paving the way for the appointment of Mujiv Hataman to the top post at the ARMM. The criminal case against Hataman was voluntarily dropped by the Akbars in 2012, while the Supreme Court threw out the case filed against Salapuddin in 2013. Both Akbar and Hataman coalitions are currently affiliated with the Liberal Party of the Philippines, led by President Aquino. Salapuddin has remained with Lakas-CMD.

=== Current officeholders ===
- Governor: Hadjiman S. Hataman-Salliman
- Vice Governor: Yusop T. Alano
- Basilan Provincial Board members:

1st District board members

1. Moumar L. Muarip
2. Nasser A. Salain
3. Aina B. Ismael
4. Ahmad Ali S. Ismael

2nd District board members

5. Paisal A. Sali
6. Abdurasil S. Aramil
7. Nasser A. Asarul
8. Hadjaria H. Hataman

Ex officio and reserved members

9. Moner Manisan, Association of Barangay Chairmen Basilan Federation President
10. Jhaber Kallahal, Philippine Councilors’ League Basilan Chapter President
11. Ahmad Rugasan Daud, Sangguniang Kabataan Basilan Federation President (term ended December 2013)
12. Masid Yacub, Indigenous Peoples' Sectoral Representative

=== Recent local elections ===
As a result of the 2010 Synchronized National and Local Elections, three major factions emerged: the Akbar block, still formidable, albeit splintered and severely weakened from within after the assassination of clan patriarch, Rep. Wahab Akbar, of the Administration Lakas-Kampi-CMD; the Hataman block, suddenly a potent force to be reckoned with province-wide, under the new administration's Liberal Party; and a third force headed by former Akbar ally and Ungkaya Pukan Mayor Joel T. Maturan, of the Nacionalista Party and former Lakas-CMD stalwart Salapuddin.

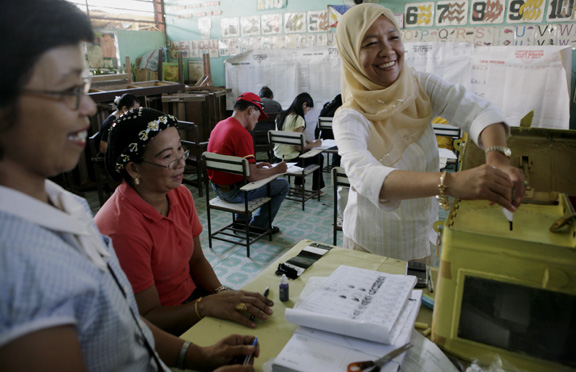
Slain Congressman Wahab Akbar's first wife Jum Jainuddin-Akbar casting her vote during the May 2007 elections.

Incumbent governor Hja. Jum Jainuddin-Akbar won the gubernatorial race, defeating Mujiv Hataman, with Ungkaya Pukan Mayor and former Akbar ally Joel T. Maturan trailing far behind. The lone congressional district of Basilan, on the other hand, was won by Hajiman Salliman Hataman (LP), who had been defeated by Wahab Akbar in 2007, followed closely by former Deputy Speaker Abdulghani Salapuddin (NP), Lantawan Mayor and Wahab Akbar's niece, Tahira Ismael-Sansawi (PMP), Maluso Mayor Sakib Salajin (Lakas-Kampi-CMD), also a nephew of Wahab Akbar and Rajam M. Akbar, Wahab Akbar's sister.

In the cities, incumbents Cherrylyn Santos-Akbar (Lakas-Kampi-CMD) of Isabela and Roderick Furigay (LDP) of Lamitan both won their respective contests. Isabela City's vice mayoral race proved to be hotly contested, with Tabuk Barangay Chairman Abdulbaki Ajibon winning over the incumbent in a close fight. Lamitan's incumbent Vice Mayor Arleigh Eisma ran unopposed.

The election season once again witnessed a spike in crime, most noticeably a rise in kidnappings, assassinations and ambuscades. On January 29, 2009, at 5:00pm, Al Barka Mayor Karam Jakilan was felled in an ambush, together with two of his personal bodyguards. Earlier, a slew of assassinations in both the Akbar and Hataman camps, most prominently an Akbar henchman and two Hataman cousins, commenced early in 2008. Also, a spate of kidnaps for ransom have been widely observed to peak as election season nears.

On April 13, 2010, two bomb blasts rocked Isabela, the first at the Basilan National High School Grandstand Oval, the second right beside Santa Isabel Cathedral. A third controlled explosion was detonated by elements of the Philippine National Police Bomb Squad a few meters from the Isabela City Hall. This was followed by the massacre of twelve residents of Theresa Heights Subdivision, Barangay Eastside, as the bombers, purportedly members of the Moro Islamic Liberation Front and Abu Sayyaf, escaped from a porous Philippine military cordon.

Local elections have been widely fraught with massive cheating, vote buying and fraud as well. Blame could not be assigned to one particular group or political block alone, as this has been a "common practice" across the political spectrum. The May 2010 automated elections turned out to be no different, with Basilan being designated an "Election Hotspot" by the Philippines' Election Commission. Violent confrontations between political supporters of rival parties, and the failure of Board of Election Inspectors in two villages in Maluso and Al-Barka Municipalities forced authorities to declare a "Failure of Elections" in these parts. Special elections were conducted in these villages on June 3, 2010, where incidents of fraud and minor scuffles were again observed.

May 2013 saw a rematch between the Akbar Block (led by incumbent governor, Jum Jainuddin-Akbar, now affiliated with the administration Liberal Party - LP), against Salapuddin (led by a young Rabia Salapuddin, daughter of former governor and Congressman Abdulgani "Gerry" Salapuddin, Lakas-CMD).

In this electoral contest, the Akbars allied with erstwhile political rivals, the Hatamans (led by Mujiv Hataman, who ran as Regional Governor of the Autonomous Region in Muslim Mindanao, and his brother, Rep. Jim Hataman-Salliman, Liberal Party), resulting in one of the most lop-sided election landslides in recent memory. Governor Akbar won her re-election bid with a record-breaking 60,000-vote margin against her only challenger, the younger Salapuddin. She is joined by Vice Governor Keemhar Jay Reynon Sakkalahul (LP) who bested a field of five Vice-Gubernatorial contenders. The son of former Basilan Vice Governor Al-Rasheed Sakkalahul, the new Vice Governor is currently the youngest Vice Governor in the Philippines, at 23 years old. Mayor Cherrylyn Santos-Akbar also won another lopsided victory in Isabela City.

The Akbar Block has likewise added two new contenders, the Governor's children - daughter Alfiya Akbar-Fernandez - who topped the Provincial Board Members' tally for District I, while son Al Qaid Akbar managed a third-place debut in local politics as an Isabela City Councilor. The provincial sweep of the Liberal Party was complete in 2013. All winning Provincial Board Members, from Districts 1 and 2 came from the LP, while 11 of 13 Mayors are LP members.

LP ARMM Standard-bearer Mujiv Hataman also won his own contest in the autonomous region - making him the first Basileño to win the region's top post in an election. LP re-electionist Congressman Jim Hataman-Salliman, his brother, likewise reclaimed his seat in Congress. Moreover, Basilan-founded Anak Mindanao Party-list is returned to the House of Representatives, with Mujiv Hataman's wife, Sitti Djalia Turabin Hataman, becoming a Party-list Representative. Elder brother Gulam Hataman is returned unopposed as Sumisip Mayor.

=== List of former governors ===
Governors after People Power Revolution 1986:

- 1986 - 1989,
- 1989 - 1992, Abdulgani Salapuddin
- 1992 - 1995, Abdulgani Salapuddin
- 1995 - 1998, Abdulgani Salapuddin
- 1998 - 2001, Wahab Akbar
- 2001 - 2004, Wahab Akbar
- 2004 - 2007, Wahab Akbar
- 2007 - 2010, Jum Akbar
- 2010 - 2013, Jum Akbar
- 2013 - 2016, Jum Akbar
- 2016 - 2019, Hajiman Hataman-Salliman
- 2019 - present, Hajiman Hataman-Salliman

Vice Governors after People Power Revolution 1986:

- 1986 - 1989,
- 1989 - 1992, Ping Kasim
- 1992 - 1995, Ping Kasim
- 1995 - 1998, Ping Kasim
- 1998 - 2001, Bonnie Balamo
- 2001 - 2004, Lukman Ampao
- 2004 - 2007, Al-Rasheed Sakkalahul
- 2007 - 2010, Al-Rasheed Sakkalahul
- 2010 - 2013, Al-Rasheed Sakkalahul
- 2013 - 2016, Keehmar Sakkalahul
- 2016 - 2019, Yusop Alano
- 2019 - present, Yusop Alano

=== "Bellwether Province" ===
In the last five presidential elections, Basilan voted for Ferdinand Edralin Marcos (1965, 1969), Corazon Cojuangco Aquino (1986), Fidel Valdez Ramos (1992), Joseph Ejercito Estrada (1998), and Gloria Macapagal-Arroyo (2004), all of whom wontheir respective bids. Similarly, Basilan's vice-presidential choices, namely Fernando Lopez (1969), Salvador Laurel (1986), Joseph Ejercito Estrada (1992), Gloria Macapagal-Arroyo (1998) and Noli de Castro (2004) also won, making it one of the most accurate bellwether provinces in Philippine politics today. Senator Mar Roxas was Basilan's Senate topnotcher in 2004, while Senator Loren Legarda was number one in 2007. The recently conducted May 2010 national/local polls manifested once again Basilan's uncanny record of picking the winners, Senator Benigno S. Aquino III (Liberal Party) and Jejomar C. Binay (PDP-Laban) won in the presidential and vice presidential contests in the province, respectively.

However, Basilan has figured prominently in a number of election-related issues in the past, the foremost being its inclusion among the provinces (together with Cebu and the rest of the ARMM provinces) where, allegedly, former President Gloria Macapagal-Arroyo committed wholesale election fraud to win the 2004 presidential elections. The ensuing Hello Garci scandal, included several mentions of Basilan and its late governor, Wahab Akbar, in taped conversations purportedly between Arroyo and COMELEC Commissioner Virgilio Garcillano.

== Flora and fauna ==
The island chain is one of two partial land bridges to Borneo and is an important migration route for birds. Among the species of flora and fauna found in Basilan are:

=== Mammals ===
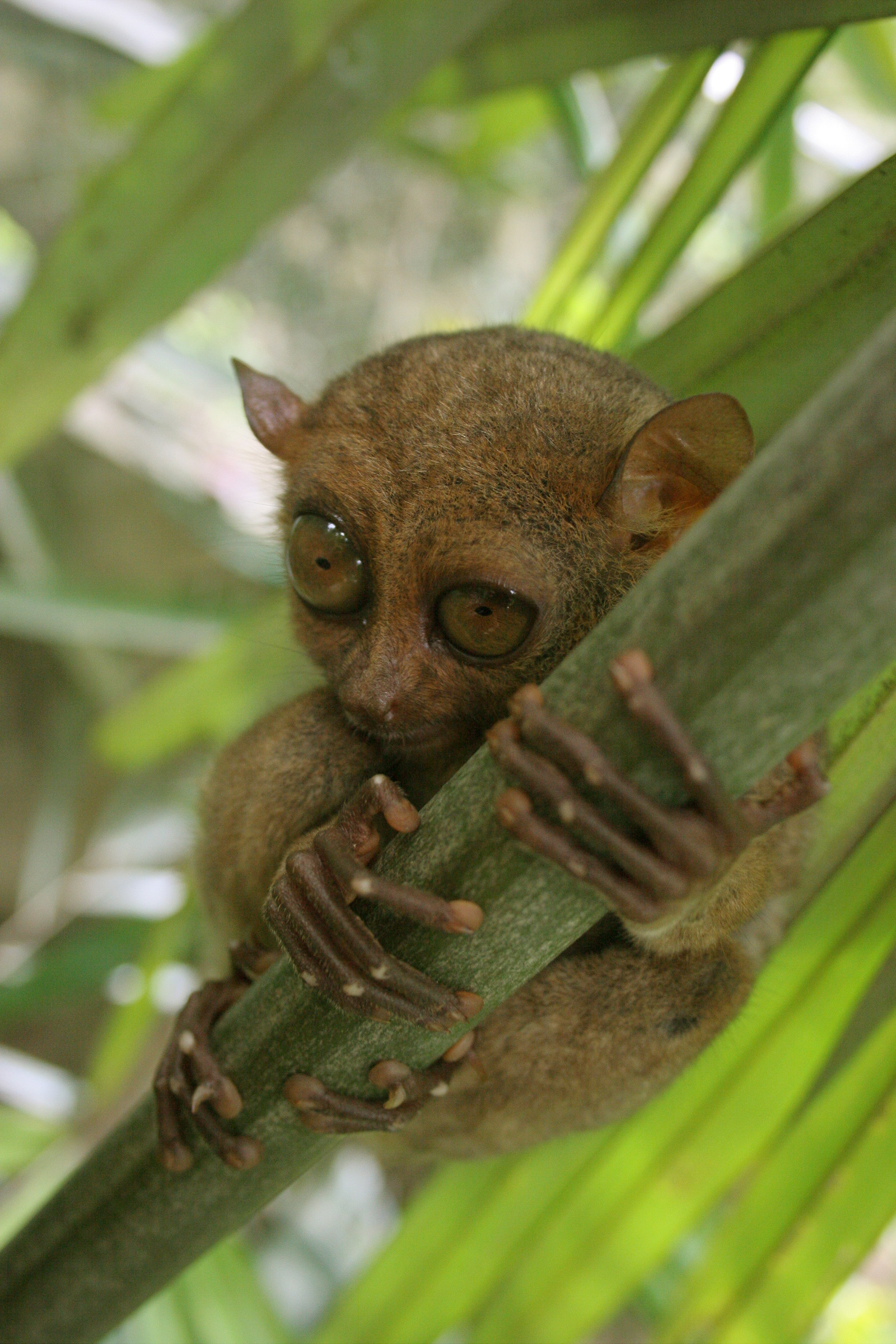
Philippine tarsier

- The Basilan flying squirrel (Petinomys crinitus), a species of rodent in the family Sciuridae. It is endemic to the southern Philippines, and found extensively in Basilan.
- The Philippine tarsier (Tarsius syrichta), a near-threatened tarsier species endemic to the Philippines.

=== Amphibians ===
- The Basilan Island caecilian (Ichthyophis glandulosus), a species of amphibian in the family Ichthyophiidae. It is endemic to the Philippines.

=== Birds ===
- The yellow-wattled bulbul (Pycnonotus urostictus), found and documented in the Philippines, specifically Isabela, Basilan, on November 15, 1887, by Moseley, E. L. Published by Steere, J. B. in a list of the birds and mammals collected by the Steere expedition to the Philippines.
- The Basilan tarictic hornbill (Penelopides panini basilanicus), a variant of Penelopides affinis basilanicus (Tweeddale, 1877). Also published by Steere, J. B., in a list of the birds and mammals collected by the Steere expedition to the Philippines.
- The Everett's white-eye basilanicus (Zosterops everetti basilanicus), with distribution throughout the Philippines, but more extensively in Basilan, Dinagat, Mindanao, Siargao, and Camiguin. (Everett's white-eye, Tweeddale, 1878)

=== Plants ===
- The Dipterocarpus basilanicus tree, lofty, emergent, with grayish brown to orange, flaky, prominently lenticellate bark and aromatic oily white resin, with stout buttresses.

== In popular culture ==
Basilan was featured in the 2004 video game Counter-Strike: Condition Zero as a map in Lost Cause, the second mission of the game. Counter-Strike: Condition Zero is a multiplayer video game that follows to Counter-Strike. Isabela City was also featured in the 2012 video game Medal of Honor: Warfighter.

Basilan was also featured in the 2006 anime television series Black Lagoon, particularly in the episodes "Lock'n Load Revolution" and "Guerrillas in the Jungle", where the island is depicted as a centre of Islamist insurgent activity and the site of an anti-guerrilla special operations base accessible to American personnel.

== Media ==
=== Newspapers ===
- Mindanao Examiner

== Notable people ==
- Wahab M. Akbar: former political kingpin and dynast, three-term governor, elected congressman in 2007, killed by a bomb blast at the House of Representatives in November 2007.
- Mujiv Sabbihi Hataman: former Anak Mindanao Party-list Representative and Regional Governor (Officer-in-Charge) of the Autonomous Region in Muslim Mindanao (ARMM) from December 2011 until June 2013, appointed by Philippine President Benigno S. Aquino III, after regular elections in August 2011 were postponed to coincide with the Synchronized National and Local elections of May 2013.
- Regino C. Hermosisima, Jr.: Supreme Court justice, presided over the Aquino-Galman double murder case as a judge at the Manila RTC. Chairman emeritus of the Philippine Young Men's Christian Association.
- Abdulgani A. Salapuddin: former MNLF commander, schooled at the Sorbonne University in Paris, France, became three-term governor, then three-term congressman, the last two times as the elected Deputy Speaker of the House of Representatives.
- Cecile Licad: concert pianist, lived in Basilan with her father Dr. Jesus Licad, who helped establish Basilan Hospital (now J. S. Alano Memorial Hospital).
- John Estrada: movie and TV actor, starred roles both as leading man and villain, currently on contract with ABSCBN TV2 Manila and TV5.
- Shamcey Gurrea Supsup: 2011 Binibining Pilipinas, Universe, third runner-up Miss Universe 2011 and current national director of Miss Universe Philippines .
- Arvery Love Lagoring: Singer and former Tawag ng Tanghalan contestant and TNT Duets winner

== See also ==
- Legislative districts of Zamboanga del Sur
- List of islands of the Philippines
- Battle of Basilan
