= 2010 Philippine House of Representatives elections =

22nd Philippine House of Representatives elections

- May 10, 2010
- All 286 seats to the House of Representatives of the Philippines; 144 seats needed for a majority
- Congressional district elections
- All 229 seats from congressional districts
| Party | Vote % | Seats | +/– |
|---|---|---|---|
| Lakas–Kampi | 37.41 | 106 | +106 |
| Liberal | 19.93 | 47 | +24 |
| NPC | 15.97 | 29 | +1 |
| Nacionalista | 11.35 | 25 | +14 |
| PMP | 2.50 | 4 | 0 |
| PDP–Laban | 0.72 | 2 | −3 |
| PDSP | 0.50 | 1 | −2 |
| LDP | 0.48 | 2 | −3 |
| KBL | 0.46 | 1 | 0 |
| LM | 0.25 | 1 | +1 |
| Others | 10.37 | 14 | +7 |
This lists parties that won seats. See the complete results below.
- Party-list election
- All 57 seats under the party-list system
| Party | Vote % | Seats | +/– |
|---|---|---|---|
| Ako Bicol | 5.06 | 3 | +3 |
| Senior Citizens | 4.31 | 2 | +1 |
| Buhay | 4.16 | 2 | −1 |
| Akbayan | 3.53 | 2 | 0 |
| Gabriela | 3.35 | 2 | 0 |
| Coop-NATCCO | 3.14 | 2 | 0 |
| 1-CARE | 2.56 | 2 | +2 |
| Abono | 2.55 | 2 | 0 |
| Bayan Muna | 2.49 | 2 | −1 |
| An Waray | 2.37 | 2 | 0 |
| CIBAC | 2.17 | 2 | 0 |
| A TEACHER | 2.05 | 2 | 0 |
| Others | 30.47 | 32 | +12 |
This lists parties that won seats. See the complete results below.
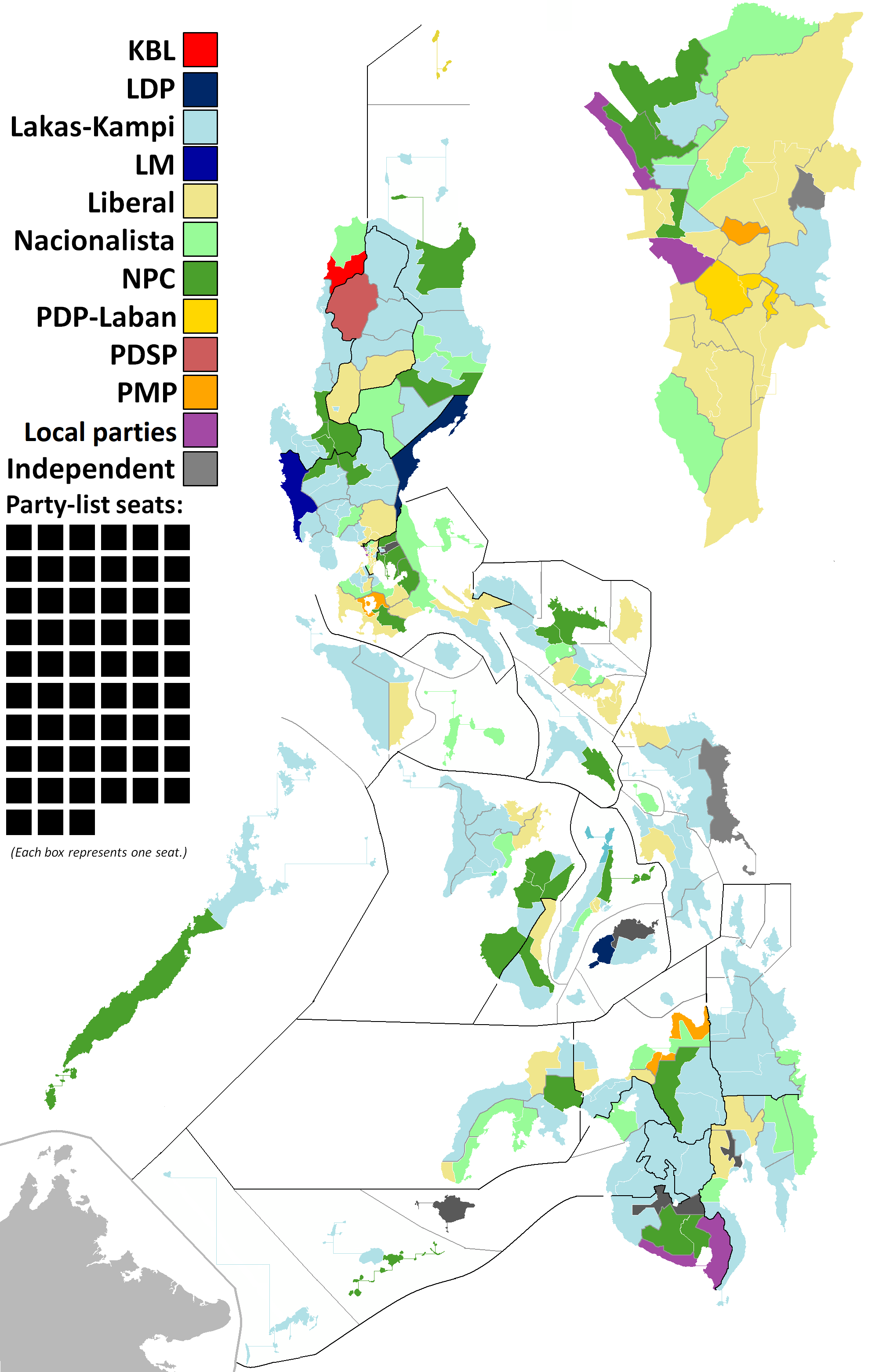
District election results (80% of the seats), with Metro Manila on the inset, and party-list seats indicated by black boxes.
| Speaker before | Speaker after |
|---|---|
| Prospero Nograles; Lakas–Kampi | Feliciano Belmonte Jr. Liberal |

Elections for the House of Representatives of the Philippines were held on May 10, 2010, to elect members to the House of Representatives of the Philippines to serve in the 15th Congress of the Philippines from June 30, 2010, to June 30, 2013. The Philippines uses parallel voting for seats in the House of Representatives; a voter has two votes: one for a representative from one's legislative district, and another for a sectoral representative via closed lists under the party-list system, with a 2% election threshold and 3-seat cap, when the parties with 2% of the national vote or more not meeting the 20% of the total seats, parties with less than 2% of the vote will get one seat each until the 20% requirement is met.

In district elections, 229 single-member districts elect one member of the House of Representatives. The candidate with the highest number of votes wins that district's seat. In the party-list election, parties will dispute 57 seats. In all, the 15th Congress will have 286 members, with 144 votes being the majority. No party entered candidates in all districts, but only Lakas Kampi CMD entered enough candidates to win an outright majority.

By May 21, GMA News and Public Affairs, based on their partial and unofficial tally, had Lakas Kampi CMD with the party with the most seats with 109, followed by the Liberal Party with 43, the Nationalist People's Coalition had 33, and the Nacionalista Party had 25. The other parties garnered 13 seats. This includes candidates who switched parties after the campaign period has begun, while excluding party-list representatives.

In the party-list election, Ako Bicol Political Party topped the election getting 5% of the national vote and won three seats, but their proclamation was delayed as a disqualification case against them was brought up; their first three nominees were subsequently seated with the dismissal of the case. As much as 43 other parties qualified to win seats, and all but two were yet to be seated due to pending disqualification cases.

Despite being the party leader and winning a congressional seat in Pampanga, Lakas Kampi CMD leader and sitting president Gloria Macapagal Arroyo had reportedly declined to run as Speaker and is fielding Edcel Lagman of Albay on the basis of term–sharing with Danilo Suarez of Quezon if they win the speakership. Meanwhile, the Liberals will be fielding in former Speaker Feliciano Belmonte Jr. of Quezon City, who was also a former Lakas Kampi member. Incumbent Speaker Prospero Nograles is barred from seeking office in the House after serving three consecutive terms; he was defeated in the Davao City mayoralty election, although his son successfully kept his father's seat.

Notable celebrities who won include Imelda Marcos (KBL, Ilocos Norte–2nd), Lani Mercado (Lakas Kampi, Cavite–2nd), Lucy Torres (Liberal, Leyte–4th) and Manny Pacquiao (PCM, Saranggani).

With the Liberals, Nacionalistas, the NPC, a faction of Lakas-Kampi, other minor parties and most of the party-list groups voting for him, Belmonte was easily elected as Speaker, with 227 votes, as compared to 29 votes of Lagman.

== Redistricting ==
Reapportioning (redistricting) the number of seats is either via national reapportionment three years after the release of every census, or via piecemeal redistricting for every province or city. National reapportionment has not happened since the 1987 constitution took effect, and aside from piecemeal redistricting, the apportionment was based on the ordinance from the constitution, which was in turn based from the 1980 census.

A total of 10 new seats were created, most notably with Cavite increasing the number of its districts from three to seven.

=== Changes from the previous Congress ===
- Division of Malabon–Navotas's at-large district to two districts
  - Navotas attains cityhood and becomes its own at-large district.
  - Malabon becomes its own at-large district.
  - Enacted into law as Republic Act No. 9387.
  - Approved in a plebiscite held on June 24, 2007.
- Creation of Quezon del Sur
  - Quezon's 1st and 2nd districts becomes Quezon del Norte and its own two districts.
  - The 3rd and 4th districts becoming Quezon del Sur and its own two districts.
  - Enacted into law as Republic Act No. 9495.
  - Defeated in a plebiscite held on December 13, 2008.

=== Changes from the outgoing Congress ===
- Division of Agusan del Sur's at-large district to two districts
  - Agusan del Sur's northern municipalities and Bayugan becomes the 1st district.
  - The southern municipalities becomes the 2nd district.
  - Enacted into law as Republic Act No. 9508.
- Division of Bulacan's 1st district to two districts
  - Malolos becomes its own at-large district, while keeping the rest of the 1st district intact.
  - Enacted into law as Republic Act No. 9591.
  - Nullified by the Supreme Court as unconstitutional.
- Reapportionment of Camarines Sur from four districts to five
  - Camarines Sur's northwestern municipalities becomes the 1st district,
  - The western municipalities and Gainza becomes the 2nd district
  - The rest of the old third district was left intact.
  - This also renumbered the rest of the districts, with the old 2nd district becoming the new 3rd district, the old 3rd district becoming the new 4th district, and the old 4th district becoming the 5th district.
  - Enacted into law as Republic Act No. 9716.
- Division of Cavite's 2nd district to two
  - Dasmariñas attains cityhood and its own at-large district.
  - The rest of the 2nd district was left intact.
  - Enacted into law as Republic Act No. 9723.
  - Approved in a plebiscite held on November 25, 2009.
- Division of Lanao del Norte's 1st district into two districts
  - Iligan becomes its own at-large district
  - The rest of the 1st district was left intact.
  - Enacted into law as Republic Act No. 9724.
- Division of Camarines Norte's at-large district to two districts
  - Camarines Norte's western, mostly Tagalog speaking municipalities becoming the 1st district.
  - The eastern, mostly Central Bikol speaking municipalities becoming the 2nd district.
  - Enacted into law as Republic Act No. 9725.
- Division of Cebu's 6th district to two districts
  - Lapu-Lapu City becomes its own at-large district.
  - The rest of the 6th district was left intact.
  - Enacted into law as Republic Act No. 9726.
- Reapportionment of Cavite from three districts to seven
  - Cavite's northern municipalities and Cavite City becomes the 1st district.
  - Bacoor becomes the 2nd district
  - Imus becomes the 3rd district
  - Dasmariñas becomes the 4th district
    - Dasmariñas's cityhood law was approved in a plebiscite later, partially repealing this law.
  - Eastern Cavite becomes the 5th district
  - Central Cavite becomes the 6th district.
  - Western Cavite and Tagaytay becomes the 7th district.
  - Enacted into law as Republic Act No. 9727.

Malolos, which was supposed to have its own congressional district from Bulacan's 1st district, but it was nullified with finality by the Supreme Court for having insufficient population. However, the ballots for both Malolos and the 1st district excluding Malolos were printed after the decision was finalized. As such, the elections for representative in Malolos and the 1st district were deferred, and voting done on May 10 was invalidated, and an election will be scheduled solely for the representative's position (all positions elected were upheld, with Malolos' first eight councilor candidates winning seats in the City Council, as opposed to the ten originally provided in the enabling law).

=== Summary of changes ===
As there are now 229 districts; therefore, there are 57 party-list seats (at least 20% of the total), an increase from 53. The 18th Congress shall then have 286 representatives.

| Category | Total |
|---|---|
| Congressional districts in the outgoing Congress | 218 |
| New districts from redistricting laws from previous Congress | 1 |
| New districts from redistricting laws from outgoing Congress | 10 |
| Congressional districts in the next Congress | 229 |
| Party-list seats for the next Congress | 57 |
| Total seats for the next Congress | 286 |

== Retiring and term-limited incumbents ==
As of now, there are 68 House representatives that are either term-limited or retiring from Congress.

== Campaign ==
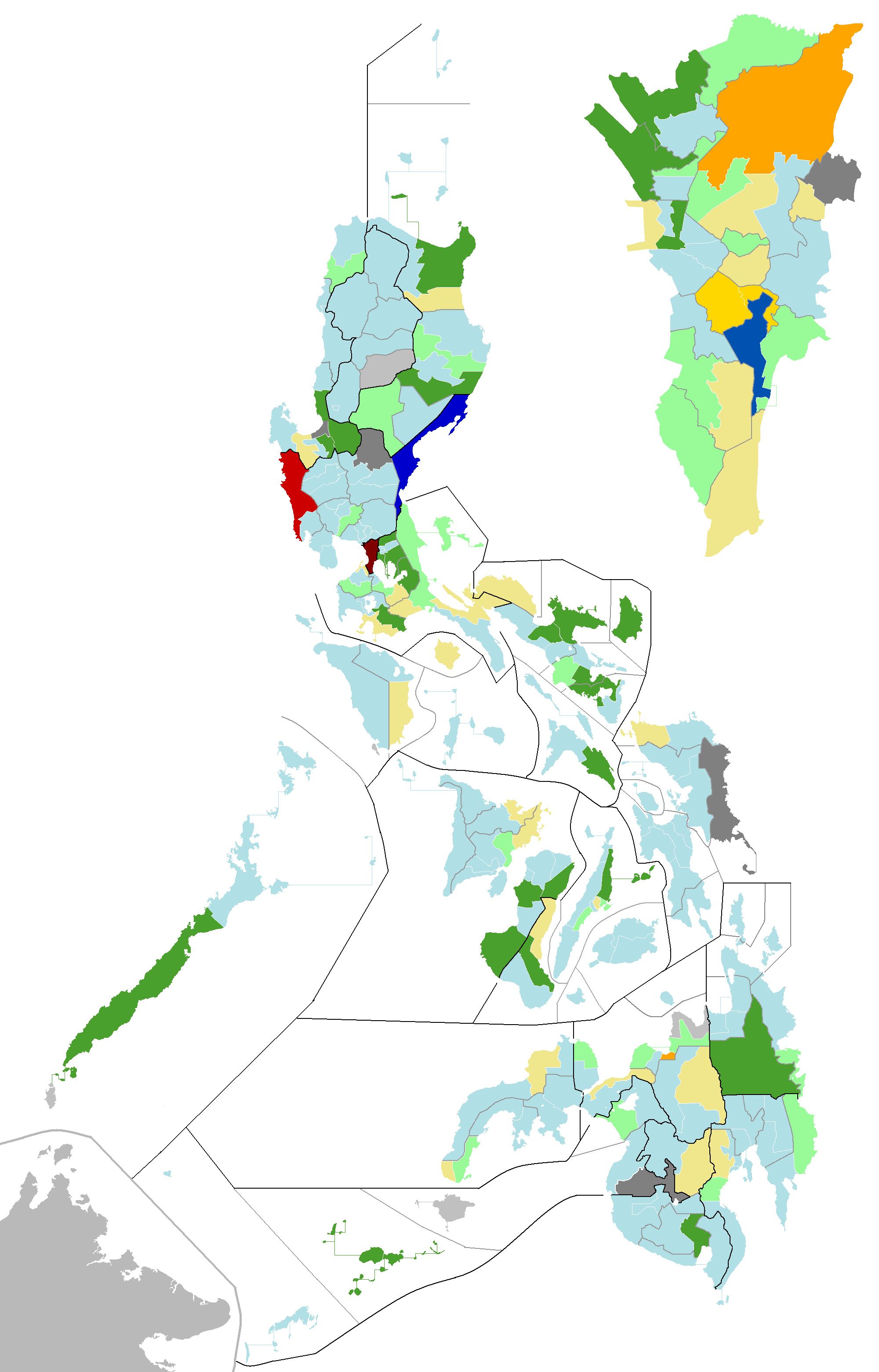
14th Congress district congressmen

Campaigns in House of Representatives elections are usually conducted on a district-by-district basis; there is no nationwide campaign. The races are between local politicians in the districts, and their allegiances and parties may switch from their announcement on the intention to run, registering as a candidate, printing out of ballots, election day and from the convening of the 15th Congress. The sitting president's party usually controls the House of Representatives no matter the election result.

The Lakas-Kampi titular head, President Arroyo, became the first president to run for a seat in the House of Representatives after her term as president; the party had the most number of candidates, and was the only party that can win an outright majority as the other parties did not run in a majority of the seats. Lakas-Kampi aimed to secure enough votes to impeach (96) as leverage if their presidential candidate Gilberto Teodoro does not win.

The Liberal Party chose former Lakas-Kampi stalwart and Quezon City mayor Feliciano Belmonte Jr. as their candidate for the speakership. Belmonte, a former speaker while being a member of Lakas-CMD (one of the two parties that formed Lakas-Kampi), defected to the Liberals before the election. The Nacionalista Party would also field a candidate for the speakership. The Nationalist People's Coalition usually supports the policies of the sitting president, while the sectoral representatives, except for those leaning to the left, also support whoever is in power. The other parties that fielded candidates on the presidential election would support their own presidential candidate, but it is unknown if they would've supported the party of the winning president; these parties fielded candidates in a minority of seats.

=== Notable races ===
==== Ilocos Region ====
- Ilocos Norte–1st: Incumbent Roque Ablan Jr. is ineligible for reelection after serving three consecutive terms. His son, Kristian Ablan is running against former Representative Rodolfo Fariñas. Fariñas is running under the Nacionalista Party and is backed by the Marcos clan. Fariñas won with just over 50% of the vote.
- Ilocos Norte–2nd: Former First Lady Imelda Marcos is running for Congress once again this time in her son's seat. Incumbent Bongbong Marcos is retiring and running for the Senate. Imelda was formerly the representative for the 1st District of Leyte from 1995 to 1998. Marcos won with 80% of the vote.
- Pangasinan–1st: Arthur Celeste is not seeking reelection. As such, six candidates are vying the open seat. The main candidates are Arthur's brother Jesus running under the Lakas-Kampi-CMD and former GMA Network investigative journalist and reporter Maki Pulido running under the Pwersa ng Masang Pilipino. Celeste beat Pulido by around 25,000 votes while failing to win via majority.
- Pangasinan–2nd: Liberal incumbent Victor Agbayani is running for Governor of Pangasinan. The Liberals are fielding Arthel Caronoñgan as their nominee for the seat. Seven candidates are running for the open seat. Former Citizen's Battle Against Corruption (CIBAC) party-list representative Kim Bernando–Lokin of the Nationalist People's Coalition (NPC) will face notably former Philippine National Police Director and colonel Leopoldo Bataoil of the Lakas-Kampi-CMD. Bataoil, despite having 36,000-vote lead against Lokin, only got 39% of the vote.
- Pangasinan–4th: Former House Speaker Jose de Venecia Jr. has served for three consecutive terms, and is thus ineligible for re-election; his wife Gina de Venecia will run for his seat in the fourth district under the Nationalist People's Coalition (NPC). She will face two independent candidates namely Alejandro Dacano and Celia Lim. De Venecia won with just under two-thirds of the votes cast.

==== Cordillera Administrative Region ====
- Ifugao: Governor Teodoro Baguilat Jr. is not seeking reelection. Instead, he will run for the open congressional seat of the province. He will face six other contenders in the election. Baguilat won with 28% of the votes cast.

==== Central Luzon ====
- Bulacan–1st: After being seated by the COMELEC after successfully challenging the result of the 2007 gubernatorial election, Roberto Pagdanganan aims to win a seat in Congress against incumbent Ma. Victoria Sy-Alvarado. After several delays, due to the re-addition of Malolos into the district after the creation of its own at-large district unconstitutional, the election was held on November 13, with Sy-Alvarado winning with 69% of the vote.
- Pampanga–2nd: Incumbent president Gloria Macapagal Arroyo is aiming to be the first president to be elected to a lower office after her presidential tenure. President Arroyo won with 84% of the vote.

==== Metro Manila ====
- Malabon: Josephine Lacson-Noel is the last representative for the Malabon-Navotas district; she was seated after the House Electoral Tribunal ruled that she won the 2007 election over Alvin Sandoval after a recount. Now she will run again for the city's first lone congressional representation under the Nationalist People's Coalition (NPC). She will face former representative and elder brother of Alvin, Federico Sandoval II of Lakas-Kampi-CMD. Sandoval run unsuccessfully for Mayor of Navotas in 2007. Sandoval finished third, behind PMP's Arnold Vicencio and Lacson-Noel who got 40% of the vote.
- Muntinlupa: Two-term Senator Rodolfo Biazon is running for a seat in the lower house against former broadcast journalist Dong Puno in a seat vacated by Biazon's son Ruffy, who is running for the Senate. Puno unsuccessfully ran for Congress in 2001, for the Senate and in 2007 for the same congressional district. They would also be facing three other candidates, namely incumbent Coun. "Lake" Espeleta, Atty. Rey Bulay and an unknown candidate. Senator Biazon won with 46% of the vote against Puno's 27%.
- Quezon City–1st:Vincent "Bingbong" Crisologo is the incumbent. He was challenged by Vivienne Tan, daughter of business tycoon Lucio Tan as an independent. Tan was disqualified on April 23, 2010, by the Court of Appeals for not being a Filipino citizen however the ruling is not yet finalized pending appeal. Crisologo won 60.78% of the vote as compared to Tan's 23.66%.
- Taguig: Incumbent Henry Duenas Jr. is not running for reelection. Those contesting the seat he is vacating are outgoing mayor Sigfrido Tiñga of the Liberal Party, and Angelito Reyes, son of Secretary of Energy Angelo Reyes, who ran against Duenas in 2007 under the local party Lingkod Taguig. Reyes was recently declared the winner of the 2007 election by the House Electoral Tribunal on February 28, 2010, with the Electoral Tribunal ruling that Reyes defeated Henry Duenas by a margin of 57 votes; the Board of Canvassers originally declared Duenas the winner with 28,564 votes over Reyes' 27,107 for a margin of 1,457. Former Mayor Sigfrido Tiñga defeated Reyes via a landslide.

==== Calabarzon ====
- Batangas–1st: Executive Secretary Eduardo Ermita is running for Congress as her daughter, Eileen Ermita-Buhain is ineligible for reelection. Ermita resigned as Executive Secretary on February 25, 2010, after the Supreme Court ruled that all appointive officials running for office are deemed resigned. Ermita was beaten by former Bureau of Customs commissioner Tomas Apacible with a margin of nine percentage points.
- Quezon–1st: Justice Secretary Agnes Devanadera is running for Congress. Devanadera resigned as Justice Secretary on February 25, 2010, after the Supreme Court ruled appointive officials running for office are deemed resigned. She will face incumbent Wilfrido Mark Enverga of the Nacionalista Party. Enverga won the vote with 56% of the vote as against Devanadera's 42%.

==== Central Visayas ====
- Bohol–3rd: Agriculture Secretary Arthur Yap is running unopposed in the congressional race, currently the only Cabinet member not facing opposition. About 25% invalid votes were recorded in the congressional election in the district.
- Cebu–4th: Celestino Martinez III is the pending incumbent after Benhur Salimbangon was unseated by the Supreme Court due to poll fraud. The case is under a motion for reconsideration. Martinez may not be seated until the last week of January as Congress will adjourn for election-campaigning. Martinez was not able to take his oath in the plenary as Salimbangon was able to hold on to the seat. Salimbangon won with 67% of the vote.
- Cebu City–2nd: Incumbent Antonio Cuenco is in third consecutive term already and is ineligible for reelection. He was appointed as Secretary-General of the ASEAN Inter-Parliamentary Assembly (AIPA) on February 4, 2010. Two of his three parties, Lakas-Kampi-CMD and the Probinsya Muna Development Initiative (PROMDI) did not nominate a candidate to run in this district. However, the Kugi Uswag Sugbo (Kusug) nominated businessman Jonathan Guardo as their candidate which is affiliated with the Nacionalista Party. Cebu City mayor Tomas Osmeña, who is in his third consecutive as mayor and is ineligible for reelection as mayor, is running for Congress under the Liberal Party and its affiliate Bando Osmeña – Pundok Kauswagan. Osmeña defeated Guardo by 64% to 35% of the votes cast.

==== Eastern Visayas ====
- Leyte–4th: Actor Richard Gomez is running for Congress after being unsuccessful twice: Disqualified in 2001 as a party-list representative when Mamamayan Ayaw sa Droga was disqualified after topping the elections, and in 2007 Senate elections where he failed to win enough votes to win a seat. Gomez was disqualified by the COMELEC after failing short of the required residency requirement. He was replaced by his wife Lucy Torres-Gomez. Torres-Gomez's 56% won against Codilla's 43%.

==== Davao Region ====
- Compostela Valley–1st: Dacer–Corbito case witness and former police superintendent Cezar Mancao is running for the open congressional seat. He is running under the Aksyon Demokratiko which in a coalition with the Liberal Party. Mancao lost the election to Maricar Apsay, daughter of the incumbent Manuel Zamora with 38% of the vote as compared to Apsay's 56%.

==== Soccsksargen ====
- Sarangani: Boxer Manny Pacquiao is aiming to win a congressional election after being beaten in South Cotabato in 2007 by Darlene Antonino-Custodio. As such, he moved to Sarangani and is vying for its open congressional seat left by out going Rep. Erwin Chiongbian. Pacquiao is running his own People's Champ Movement which is co-endorsed by the Nacionalista Party. He will face Rep. Chiongbian's third brother, Roy Chiongbian, a local businessman. Roy is co-endorsed by the local Sarangani Reconciliation and Reformation Organization and Lakas Kampi CMD. Pacquiao won comfortably with two-thirds of votes cast.

==== Party-list ====
Several party-list organizations were delisted, added to the list, disqualified and re-listed in the run-up to the election, most notably LGBT party Ang Ladlad which secured a Supreme Court injunction preventing COMELEC from disqualifying them. Mikey Arroyo's nomination by Ang Galing Pinoy, a party representing tricycle drivers and security guards, and other personalities of the Arroyo administration that were nominated by supposedly underrepresented sectors had also been questioned.

== Results ==
=== District elections ===
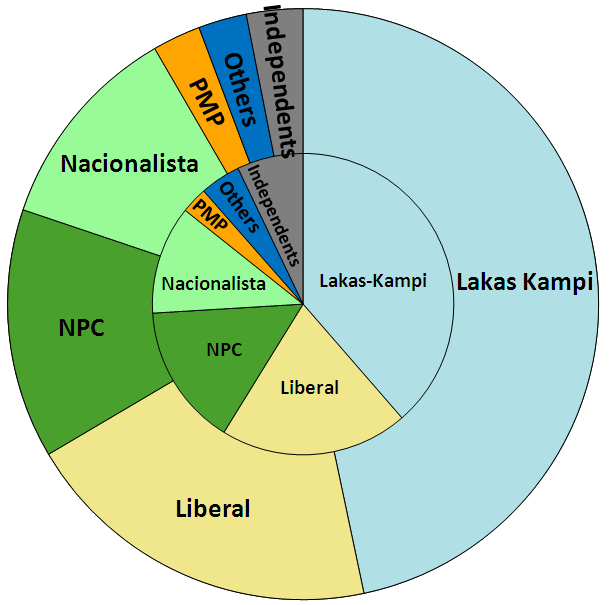
Proportion of votes (inner ring) as compared to the proportion of seats (outer ring). Party-list seats are excluded since they are voted separately.

In district elections, the candidate with the highest number of votes in the district wins that district's seat. Even prior to the election when Lakas Kampi CMD members switched parties to either the Liberals or the Nacionalistas, they still suffered the biggest seat losses, although they still retained the plurality of seats in the House. The Liberals and Nacionalistas all gained seats but will not surpass the number of Lakas Kampi's seats. Lakas Kampi also tallied the most votes, but had a disproportionate number of seats won (38% of the vote as compared to 45% of the district seats).

A total of seven independents won in the House.

| Party | Votes | % | Seats | +/– |
|---|---|---|---|---|
| Lakas Kampi CMD | 12,769,649 | 37.41 | 106 | New |
| Liberal Party | 6,802,227 | 19.93 | 47 | +24 |
| Nationalist People's Coalition | 5,450,135 | 15.97 | 29 | +1 |
| Nacionalista Party | 3,872,637 | 11.35 | 25 | +14 |
| Pwersa ng Masang Pilipino | 853,619 | 2.50 | 4 | 0 |
| PDP–Laban | 246,697 | 0.72 | 2 | −3 |
| Bigkis Pinoy Movement | 206,929 | 0.61 | 0 | 0 |
| Partido Demokratiko Sosyalista ng Pilipinas | 171,345 | 0.50 | 1 | −2 |
| Laban ng Demokratikong Pilipino | 162,434 | 0.48 | 2 | −3 |
| Kilusang Bagong Lipunan | 158,416 | 0.46 | 1 | 0 |
| Aksyon Demokratiko | 151,434 | 0.44 | 0 | 0 |
| Kugi Uswag Sugbo | 126,144 | 0.37 | 0 | 0 |
| People's Champ Movement | 120,052 | 0.35 | 1 | New |
| Lapiang Manggagawa | 86,556 | 0.25 | 1 | New |
| Partido Navoteño | 76,276 | 0.22 | 1 | New |
| Bagumbayan–VNP | 74,319 | 0.22 | 0 | 0 |
| Kabalikat ng Bayan sa Kaunlaran | 70,852 | 0.21 | 1 | New |
| Sarangani Reconciliation and Reformation Organization | 60,899 | 0.18 | 0 | 0 |
| Partido Magdiwang | 47,840 | 0.14 | 1 | New |
| Grand Alliance for Democracy | 47,677 | 0.14 | 0 | 0 |
| Ugyon Kita Capiz | 45,859 | 0.13 | 0 | 0 |
| Ang Kapatiran | 45,631 | 0.13 | 0 | 0 |
| Aton Tamdon Utod Negrosa-non | 42,796 | 0.13 | 0 | 0 |
| Philippine Green Republican Party | 21,636 | 0.06 | 0 | 0 |
| Lingkod Taguig | 16,990 | 0.05 | 0 | −1 |
| Bangon Pilipinas | 11,294 | 0.03 | 0 | 0 |
| Kapayapaan, Kaunlaran at Katarungan | 11,076 | 0.03 | 0 | 0 |
| Lapiang Manggagawa Workers and Peasants Party | 8,894 | 0.03 | 0 | 0 |
| Buklod | 876 | 0.00 | 0 | 0 |
| Independent | 2,371,949 | 6.95 | 7 | −3 |
| Party-list seats | | | 57 | +4 |
| Total | 34,133,138 | 100.00 | 286 | +15 |
| Valid votes | 34,133,138 | 89.47 | | |
| Invalid/blank votes | 4,016,233 | 10.53 | | |
| Total votes | 38,149,371 | 100.00 | | |
| Registered voters/turnout | 51,317,073 | 74.34 | | |

Vote share
| Lakas-Kampi | 37.41% |
| Liberal | 19.93% |
| NPC | 15.97% |
| Nacionalista | 11.35% |
| Others | 15.34% |

Congressional district seats
| Lakas-Kampi | 46.29% |
| Liberal | 20.52% |
| NPC | 12.66% |
| Nacionalista | 10.62% |
| Others | 9.61% |

==== By district ====
| Congressional district | Incumbent | Incumbent's party | Winner | Winner's party | Winning margin |
|---|---|---|---|---|---|
| Abra | Cecilia Seares-Luna | Lakas–Kampi | Joy Bernos | PDSP | 0.95% |
| Agusan del Norte–1st | Jose Aquino II | Lakas–Kampi | Jose Aquino II | Lakas–Kampi | 37.00% |
| Agusan del Norte–2nd | Edelmiro Amante | Lakas–Kampi | Angelica Amante | Lakas–Kampi | 40.74% |
| Agusan del Sur–1st | New seat | | Maria Valentina Plaza | Lakas–Kampi | 30.50% |
| Agusan del Sur–2nd | New seat | | Evelyn Mellana | Lakas–Kampi | 18.28% |
| Aklan | Florencio Miraflores | Lakas–Kampi | Florencio Miraflores | Lakas–Kampi | Unopposed |
| Albay–1st | Edcel Lagman | Lakas–Kampi | Edcel Lagman | Lakas–Kampi | 67.56% |
| Albay–2nd | Al Francis Bichara | Nacionalista | Al Francis Bichara | Nacionalista | 31.15% |
| Albay–3rd | Reno Lim | NPC | Fernando Gonzalez | Liberal | 14.41% |
| Antipolo–1st | Roberto Puno | Lakas–Kampi | Roberto Puno | Lakas–Kampi | 27.55% |
| Antipolo–2nd | Angelito Gatlabayan | Lakas–Kampi | Romeo Acop | Independent | 7.16% |
| Antique | Exequiel Javier | Lakas–Kampi | Paolo Javier | Lakas–Kampi | 12.94% |
| Apayao | Elias Bulut Jr. | Lakas–Kampi | Eleanor Begtang | Lakas–Kampi | 73.72% |
| Aurora | Sonny Angara | LDP | Sonny Angara | LDP | 61.26% |
| Bacolod | Monico Puentevella | Lakas–Kampi | Anthony Golez | NPC | 7.16% |
| Baguio | Mauricio Domogan | Lakas–Kampi | Bernardo Vergara | Lakas–Kampi | 8.67% |
| Basilan | Vacant | | Hadjiman Hataman Salliman | Independent | 8.53% |
| Bataan–1st | Herminia Roman | Lakas–Kampi | Herminia Roman | Lakas–Kampi | 2.54% |
| Bataan–2nd | Albert Garcia | Lakas–Kampi | Albert Garcia | Lakas–Kampi | 25.90% |
| Batanes | Carlo Oliver Diasnes | Lakas–Kampi | Henedina Abad | Liberal | 1.06% |
| Batangas–1st | Eileen Ermita-Buhain | Lakas–Kampi | Tomas Apacible | Liberal | 9.66% |
| Batangas–2nd | Hermilando Mandanas | Liberal | Hermilando Mandanas | Liberal | 26.64% |
| Batangas–3rd | Victoria Hernandez-Reyes | Lakas–Kampi | Sonny Collantes | PMP | 2.77% |
| Batangas–4th | Mark Llandro Mendoza | NPC | Mark Llandro Mendoza | NPC | 89.20% |
| Benguet | Samuel Dangwa | Lakas–Kampi | Ronald Cosalan | Liberal | 7.35% |
| Biliran | Glenn Chong | Lakas–Kampi | Rogelio Espina | Nacionalista | 0.45% |
| Bohol–1st | Edgar Chatto | Lakas–Kampi | Rene Relampagos | LDP | 25.56% |
| Bohol–2nd | Roberto Cajes | Lakas–Kampi | Erico Aumentado | Independent | 22.20% |
| Bohol–3rd | Adam Jala | Lakas–Kampi | Arthur C. Yap | Lakas–Kampi | Unopposed |
| Bukidnon–1st | Candido Pancrudo Jr. | Lakas–Kampi | Jesus Emmanuel Paras | NPC | 17.28% |
| Bukidnon–2nd | TG Guingona | Liberal | Florencio Flores Jr. | Lakas–Kampi | 37.68% |
| Bukidnon–3rd | Jose Zubiri III | Lakas–Kampi | Jose Zubiri III | Lakas–Kampi | 81.43% |
| Bulacan–1st (deferred) | Victoria Sy-Alvarado | Lakas–Kampi | Victoria Sy-Alvarado | Lakas–Kampi | 42.76% |
| Bulacan–2nd | Pedro Pancho | Lakas–Kampi | Pedro Pancho | Lakas–Kampi | 9.92% |
| Bulacan–3rd | Lorna Silverio | Lakas–Kampi | Jonjon Mendoza | Liberal | 12.97% |
| Bulacan–4th | Reylina Nicolas | Lakas–Kampi | Linabelle Villarica | Liberal | 68.73% |
| Cagayan–1st | Sally Ponce Enrile | NPC | Jack Enrile | NPC | 15.81% |
| Cagayan–2nd | Florencio Vargas | Lakas–Kampi | Florencio Vargas | Lakas–Kampi | 48.94% |
| Cagayan–3rd | Manuel Mamba | Liberal | Randolph Ting | Lakas–Kampi | 28.56% |
| Cagayan de Oro–1st | Rolando Uy | Lakas–Kampi | Jose Benjamin Benaldo | PMP | 1.94% |
| Cagayan de Oro–2nd | Rufus Rodriguez | PMP | Rufus Rodriguez | PMP | 94.17% |
| Caloocan–1st | Oscar Malapitan | Nacionalista | Oscar Malapitan | Nacionalista | 46.88% |
| Caloocan–2nd | Mitch Cajayon-Uy | Lakas–Kampi | Mitch Cajayon-Uy | Lakas–Kampi | 28.69% |
| Camarines Norte–1st | New seat | | Renato Unico Jr. | Lakas–Kampi | 23.77% |
| Camarines Norte–2nd | New seat | | Elmer Panotes | Lakas–Kampi | 3.76% |
| Camarines Sur–1st | Dato Arroyo | Lakas–Kampi | Rolando Andaya Jr. | Lakas–Kampi | 70.62% |
| Camarines Sur–2nd | Luis Villafuerte | NPC | Dato Arroyo | Lakas–Kampi | 41.48% |
| Camarines Sur–3rd | Arnulfo Fuentebella | NPC | Luis Villafuerte | NPC | 54.84% |
| Camarines Sur–4th | Felix Alfelor Jr. | Lakas–Kampi | Arnulfo Fuentebella | NPC | 23.04% |
| Camarines Sur–5th | New seat | | Salvio Fortuno | Nacionalista | 0.62% |
| Camiguin | Pedro Romualdo | Lakas–Kampi | Pedro Romualdo | Lakas–Kampi | 54.84% |
| Capiz–1st | Antonio del Rosario | Liberal | Antonio del Rosario | Liberal | 19.10% |
| Capiz–2nd | Fredenil Castro | Lakas–Kampi | Jane Castro | Lakas–Kampi | 39.02% |
| Catanduanes | Joseph Santiago | NPC | Cesar Sarmiento | Liberal | 0.59% |
| Cavite–1st | Jun Abaya | Liberal | Jun Abaya | Liberal | 12.21% |
| Cavite–2nd | Elpidio Barzaga Jr. | Lakas–Kampi | Lani Mercado | Lakas–Kampi | 23.64% |
| Cavite–3rd | Jesus Crispin Remulla | Nacionalista | Ayong Maliksi | Liberal | 31.09% |
| Cavite–4th | New seat | | Elpidio Barzaga Jr. | Lakas–Kampi | 87.45% |
| Cavite–5th | New seat | | Roy Loyola | Liberal | 6.62% |
| Cavite–6th | New seat | | Antonio Ferrer | Lakas–Kampi | 25.57% |
| Cavite–7th | New seat | | Jesus Crispin Remulla | Nacionalista | 42.40% |
| Cebu–1st | Eduardo Gullas | Nacionalista | Eduardo Gullas | Nacionalista | 88.24% |
| Cebu–2nd | Pablo P. Garcia | Lakas–Kampi | Pablo P. Garcia | Lakas–Kampi | 31.28% |
| Cebu–3rd | Pablo John Garcia | Lakas–Kampi | Pablo John Garcia | Lakas–Kampi | 23.22% |
| Cebu–4th | Benhur Salimbangon | Lakas–Kampi | Benhur Salimbangon | Lakas–Kampi | 34.96% |
| Cebu–5th | Ramon Durano VI | NPC | Ramon Durano VI | NPC | 66.93% |
| Cebu–6th | Nerissa Soon-Ruiz | Nacionalista | Luigi Quisumbing | Lakas–Kampi | 31.94% |
| Cebu City–1st | Raul del Mar | Liberal | Rachel del Mar | Liberal | 23.76% |
| Cebu City–2nd | Antonio Cuenco | Lakas–Kampi | Tomas Osmeña | Liberal | 29.72% |
| Compostela Valley–1st | Manuel E. Zamora | Lakas–Kampi | Maricar Zamora | Lakas–Kampi | 18.51% |
| Compostela Valley–2nd | Rommel Amatong | Lakas–Kampi | Rommel Amatong | Lakas–Kampi | 33.01% |
| Cotabato–1st | Emmylou Mendoza | Lakas–Kampi | Jesus Sacdalan | Lakas–Kampi | 18.12% |
| Cotabato–2nd | Bernardo Piñol Jr. | Liberal | Nancy Catamco | Lakas–Kampi | 2.88% |
| Davao City–1st | Prospero Nograles | Lakas–Kampi | Karlo Nograles | Lakas–Kampi | 3.90% |
| Davao City–2nd | Vincent Garcia | Lakas–Kampi | Mylene Garcia | Independent | 10.69% |
| Davao City–3rd | Isidro Ungab | Liberal | Isidro Ungab | Liberal | 14.23% |
| Davao del Norte–1st | Arrel Olaño | Lakas–Kampi | Antonio Rafael del Rosario | Liberal | 48.40% |
| Davao del Norte–2nd | Antonio Lagdameo Jr. | Lakas–Kampi | Antonio Lagdameo Jr. | Lakas–Kampi | Unopposed |
| Davao del Sur–1st | Marc Douglas Cagas IV | Nacionalista | Marc Douglas Cagas IV | Nacionalista | 18.23% |
| Davao del Sur–2nd | Franklin Bautista | Lakas–Kampi | Franklin Bautista | Lakas–Kampi | 33.20% |
| Davao Oriental–1st | Nelson Dayanghirang | Nacionalista | Nelson Dayanghirang | Nacionalista | Unopposed |
| Davao Oriental–2nd | Thelma Almario | Lakas–Kampi | Thelma Almario | Lakas–Kampi | 70.33% |
| Dinagat Islands | Glenda Ecleo | Lakas–Kampi | Ruben Ecleo Jr. | Lakas–Kampi | 72.10% |
| Eastern Samar | Teodulo Coquilla | Independent | Ben Evardone | Independent | 4.04% |
| Guimaras | JC Rahman Nava | Lakas–Kampi | JC Rahman Nava | Lakas–Kampi | 81.94% |
| Ifugao | Solomon Chungalao | Lakas–Kampi | Teddy Baguilat | Liberal | 5.91% |
| Iligan | New seat | | Vicente Belmonte Jr. | Liberal | 87.37% |
| Ilocos Norte–1st | Roque Ablan Jr. | Lakas–Kampi | Rodolfo Fariñas | Nacionalista | 22.27% |
| Ilocos Norte–2nd | Bongbong Marcos | Nacionalista | Imelda Marcos | KBL | 60.04% |
| Ilocos Sur–1st | Ronald Singson | Lakas–Kampi | Ronald Singson | Lakas–Kampi | 44.54% |
| Ilocos Sur–2nd | Eric Singson | Lakas–Kampi | Eric Singson Jr. | Lakas–Kampi | 88.88% |
| Iloilo–1st | Janette Garin | Lakas–Kampi | Janette Garin | Lakas–Kampi | Unopposed |
| Iloilo–2nd | Judy Syjuco | Lakas–Kampi | Augusto Syjuco Jr. | Lakas–Kampi | 28.61% |
| Iloilo–3rd | Arthur Defensor Sr. | Lakas–Kampi | Arthur Defensor Jr. | Lakas–Kampi | 22.15% |
| Iloilo–4th | Ferjenel Biron | Nacionalista | Ferjenel Biron | Nacionalista | 29.20% |
| Iloilo–5th | Niel Tupas Jr. | Liberal | Niel Tupas Jr. | Liberal | 5.14% |
| Iloilo City | Raul Gonzalez Jr. | Lakas–Kampi | Jerry Treñas | Nacionalista | 13.42% |
| Isabela–1st | Rodolfo Albano III | Lakas–Kampi | Rodolfo Albano Jr. | Lakas–Kampi | 50.06% |
| Isabela–2nd | Edwin Uy | Liberal | Ana Cristina Go | Nacionalista | 1.92% |
| Isabela–3rd | Bojie Dy | Lakas–Kampi | Napoleon Dy | Lakas–Kampi | 14.44% |
| Isabela–4th | Giorgidi Aggabao | NPC | Giorgidi Aggabao | NPC | 3.16% |
| Kalinga | Manuel Agyao | Lakas–Kampi | Manuel Agyao | Lakas–Kampi | 49.98% |
| La Union–1st | Victor Francisco Ortega | Lakas–Kampi | Victor Francisco Ortega | Lakas–Kampi | Unopposed |
| La Union–2nd | Thomas Dumpit Jr. | Lakas–Kampi | Eufranio Eriguel | NPC | 30.70% |
| Laguna–1st | Dan Fernandez | Lakas–Kampi | Dan Fernandez | Lakas–Kampi | 51.78% |
| Laguna–2nd | Timmy Chipeco | Nacionalista | Timmy Chipeco | Nacionalista | 54.64% |
| Laguna–3rd | Maria Evita Arago | Liberal | Maria Evita Arago | Liberal | 31.35% |
| Laguna–4th | Edgar San Luis | NPC | Edgar San Luis | NPC | Unopposed |
| Lanao del Norte–1st | Vicente Belmonte Jr. | Liberal | Imelda Dimaporo | Lakas–Kampi | 43.28% |
| Lanao del Norte–2nd | Abdullah Dimaporo | Lakas–Kampi | Fatima Aliah Dimaporo | Lakas–Kampi | 69.60% |
| Lanao del Sur–1st | Faysah Dumarpa | Nacionalista | Mohammed Hussein Pangandaman | Lakas–Kampi | |
| Lanao del Sur–2nd | Pangalian Balindong | Lakas–Kampi | Pangalian Balindong | Lakas–Kampi | |
| Lapu-Lapu City | New seat | | Arturo Radaza | Lakas–Kampi | 29.74% |
| Las Piñas | Cynthia Villar | Nacionalista | Mark Villar | Nacionalista | 79.77% |
| Leyte–1st | Martin Romualdez | Lakas–Kampi | Martin Romualdez | Lakas–Kampi | 20.10% |
| Leyte–2nd | Trinidad Apostol | Lakas–Kampi | Sergio Apostol | Lakas–Kampi | 34.39% |
| Leyte–3rd | Andres Salvacion Jr. | Lakas–Kampi | Andres Salvacion Jr. | Lakas–Kampi | 20.75% |
| Leyte–4th | Eufrocino Codilla Sr. | Lakas–Kampi | Lucy Torres-Gomez | Liberal | 13.86% |
| Leyte–5th | Carmen Cari | Lakas–Kampi | Jose Carlos Cari | Lakas–Kampi | Unopposed |
| Maguindanao–1st | Didagen Dilangalen | Independent | Bai Sandra Sema | Lakas–Kampi | 31.96% |
| Maguindanao–2nd | Simeon Datumanong | Lakas–Kampi | Simeon Datumanong | Lakas–Kampi | Unopposed |
| Makati–1st | Teodoro Locsin Jr. | PDP–Laban | Monique Lagdameo | PDP–Laban | 0.20% |
| Makati–2nd | Abigail Binay | PDP–Laban | Abigail Binay | PDP–Laban | 35.31% |
| Malabon | New seat | | Josephine Lacson-Noel | NPC | 7.51% |
| Malolos (invalidated) | New seat | | Danny Domingo | Liberal | 28.09% |
| Mandaluyong | Neptali Gonzales II | Liberal | Neptali Gonzales II | Liberal | Unopposed |
| Manila–1st | Benjamin Asilo | Liberal/KKK | Benjamin Asilo | Liberal/KKK | 29.31% |
| Manila–2nd | Jaime Lopez | Lakas–Kampi | Carlo Lopez | Liberal/KKK | 12.30% |
| Manila–3rd | Zenaida Angping | NPC | Zenaida Angping | NPC | 30.39% |
| Manila–4th | Trisha Bonoan-David | Lakas–Kampi | Trisha Bonoan-David | Lakas–Kampi | 10.26% |
| Manila–5th | Amado Bagatsing | KABAKA | Amado Bagatsing | KABAKA | 19.12% |
| Manila–6th | Benny Abante | Lakas–Kampi | Rosenda Ann Ocampo | Liberal/KKK | 1.81% |
| Marikina–1st | Marcelino Teodoro | Independent | Marcelino Teodoro | Independent | 35.85% |
| Marikina–2nd | Del de Guzman | Liberal | Miro Quimbo | Liberal | 40.53% |
| Marinduque | Carmencita Reyes | Liberal | Lord Allan Velasco | Lakas–Kampi | 4.08% |
| Masbate–1st | Narciso Bravo Jr. | Lakas–Kampi | Narciso Bravo Jr. | Lakas–Kampi | 20.90% |
| Masbate–2nd | Antonio Kho | Lakas–Kampi | Antonio Kho | Lakas–Kampi | 17.22% |
| Masbate–3rd | Rizalina Seachon-Lanete | NPC | Scott Davies Lanete | NPC | 8.98% |
| Misamis Occidental–1st | Marina Clarete | Nacionalista | Jorge Almonte | Lakas–Kampi | 1.22% |
| Misamis Occidental–2nd | Herminia Ramiro | Lakas–Kampi | Loreto Leo Ocampos | Liberal | 0.74% |
| Misamis Oriental–1st | Vacant | | Peter Unabia | PMP | 8.86% |
| Misamis Oriental–2nd | Yevgeny Emano | Nacionalista | Yevgeny Emano | Nacionalista | 21.56% |
| Mountain Province | Vacant | | Maximo Dalog | Lakas–Kampi | 1.03% |
| Muntinlupa | Ruffy Biazon | Liberal | Rodolfo Biazon | Liberal | 18.69% |
| Navotas | New seat | | Toby Tiangco | Navoteño | Unopposed |
| Negros Occidental–1st | Jules Ledesma | NPC | Jules Ledesma | NPC | 88.02% |
| Negros Occidental–2nd | Alfredo Marañon III | Lakas–Kampi | Alfredo Marañon III | Lakas–Kampi | 66.58% |
| Negros Occidental–3rd | Jose Carlos Lacson | Lakas–Kampi | Albee Benitez | NPC | 40.58% |
| Negros Occidental–4th | Jeffrey Ferrer | NPC | Jeffrey Ferrer | NPC | Unopposed |
| Negros Occidental–5th | Iggy Arroyo | Lakas–Kampi | Iggy Arroyo | Lakas–Kampi | 74.86% |
| Negros Occidental–6th | Mercedes Alvarez | NPC | Mercedes Alvarez | NPC | 63.88% |
| Negros Oriental–1st | Jocelyn Limkaichong | Liberal | Jocelyn Limkaichong | Liberal | 28.16% |
| Negros Oriental–2nd | George Arnaiz | NPC | George Arnaiz | NPC | 19.88% |
| Negros Oriental–3rd | Pryde Henry Teves | Lakas–Kampi | Pryde Henry Teves | Lakas–Kampi | 34.88% |
| Northern Samar–1st | Paul Daza | Liberal | Raul Daza | Liberal | 22.07% |
| Northern Samar–2nd | Emil Ong | Lakas–Kampi | Emil Ong | Lakas–Kampi | 2.68% |
| Nueva Ecija–1st | Eduardo Nonato Joson | Independent | Josefina Joson | NPC | 11.18% |
| Nueva Ecija–2nd | Joseph Gilbert Violago | Lakas–Kampi | Joseph Gilbert Violago | Lakas–Kampi | 56.78% |
| Nueva Ecija–3rd | Czarina Umali | Lakas–Kampi | Czarina Umali | Lakas–Kampi | 24.53% |
| Nueva Ecija–4th | Rodolfo Antonino | Lakas–Kampi | Rodolfo Antonino | Lakas–Kampi | 37.51% |
| Nueva Vizcaya | Carlos Padilla | Nacionalista | Carlos Padilla | Nacionalista | 28.75% |
| Occidental Mindoro | Girlie Villarosa | Lakas–Kampi | Girlie Villarosa | Lakas–Kampi | 10.79% |
| Oriental Mindoro–1st | Rodolfo Valencia | Lakas–Kampi | Rodolfo Valencia | Lakas–Kampi | 11.13% |
| Oriental Mindoro–2nd | Alfonso Umali | Liberal | Reynaldo Umali | Liberal | 10.36% |
| Palawan–1st | Antonio Alvarez | Lakas–Kampi | Antonio Alvarez | Lakas–Kampi | 16.36% |
| Palawan–2nd | Abraham Mitra | Liberal | Victorino Dennis Socrates | NPC | 1.42% |
| Pampanga–1st | Carmelo Lazatin Sr. | Lakas–Kampi | Carmelo Lazatin Sr. | Lakas–Kampi | 60.54% |
| Pampanga–2nd | Mikey Arroyo | Lakas–Kampi | Gloria Macapagal Arroyo | Lakas–Kampi | 73.81% |
| Pampanga–3rd | Aurelio Gonzales Jr. | Lakas–Kampi | Aurelio Gonzales Jr. | Lakas–Kampi | 76.78% |
| Pampanga–4th | Anna York Bondoc | Nacionalista | Anna York Bondoc | Nacionalista | 22.10% |
| Pangasinan–1st | Arthur Celeste | Lakas–Kampi | Jesus Celeste | Lakas–Kampi | 15.04% |
| Pangasinan–2nd | Victor Agbayani | Liberal | Leopoldo Bataoil | Lakas–Kampi | 20.33% |
| Pangasinan–3rd | Maria Rachel Arenas | Lakas–Kampi | Maria Rachel Arenas | Lakas–Kampi | 30.16% |
| Pangasinan–4th | Jose de Venecia | Independent | Gina de Venecia | NPC | 33.22% |
| Pangasinan–5th | Mark Cojuangco | NPC | Kimi Cojuangco | NPC | 40.26% |
| Pangasinan–6th | Conrado Estrella III | NPC | Marilyn Primcias-Agabas | NPC | 14.72% |
| Parañaque–1st | Eduardo Zialcita | Nacionalista | Edwin Olivarez | Liberal | 21.95% |
| Parañaque–2nd | Roilo Golez | Liberal | Roilo Golez | Liberal | 91.98% |
| Pasay | Jose Antonio Roxas | Lakas–Kampi | Emi Rubiano | Liberal | 8.15% |
| Pasig | Roman Romulo | Lakas–Kampi | Roman Romulo | Lakas–Kampi | 80.46% |
| Quezon–1st | Mark Enverga | Nacionalista | Mark Enverga | Nacionalista | 13.65% |
| Quezon–2nd | Proceso Alcala | Liberal | Irvin Alcala | Liberal | 56.94% |
| Quezon–3rd | Danilo Suarez | Lakas–Kampi | Danilo Suarez | Lakas–Kampi | 60.04% |
| Quezon–4th | Erin Tañada | Liberal | Erin Tañada | Liberal | Unopposed |
| Quezon City–1st | Vincent Crisologo | Nacionalista | Vincent Crisologo | Nacionalista | 37.12% |
| Quezon City–2nd | Annie Rosa Susano | PMP | Winston Castelo | Liberal | 7.08% |
| Quezon City–3rd | Matias Defensor Jr. | Lakas–Kampi | Jorge John Bernal Jr. | Liberal | 6.63% |
| Quezon City–4th | Nanette Castelo-Daza | Liberal | Feliciano Belmonte Jr. | Liberal | 59.98% |
| Quirino | Junie Cua | Lakas–Kampi | Dakila Cua | Lakas–Kampi | 66.54% |
| Rizal–1st | Jack Duavit | NPC | Joel Duavit | NPC | 61.30% |
| Rizal–2nd | Adeline Rodriguez-Zaldarriaga | NPC | Isidro Rodriguez Jr. | NPC | 61.32% |
| Romblon | Eleandro Jesus Madrona | Nacionalista | Eleandro Jesus Madrona | Nacionalista | 15.41% |
| Samar–1st | Reynaldo Uy | Lakas–Kampi | Mel Senen Sarmiento | Lakas–Kampi | 20.74% |
| Samar–2nd | Sharee Ann Tan | Lakas–Kampi | Milagrosa Tan | Lakas–Kampi | 11.91% |
| San Jose del Monte | Arthur Robes | Lakas–Kampi | Arthur Robes | Lakas–Kampi | 65.87% |
| San Juan | Ronaldo Zamora | Nacionalista | JV Ejercito | PMP | Unopposed |
| Sarangani | Erwin Chiongbian | SARRO | Manny Pacquiao | PCM | 32.70% |
| Siquijor | Orlando Fua | Lakas–Kampi | Orlando Fua | Lakas–Kampi | 46.48% |
| Sorsogon–1st | Salvador Escudero | NPC | Salvador Escudero | NPC | 17.16% |
| Sorsogon–2nd | Jose Solis | Lakas–Kampi | Deogracias Ramos | Liberal | 0.82% |
| South Cotabato–1st | Darlene Antonino-Custodio | NPC | Pedro Acharon Jr. | NPC | 47.38% |
| South Cotabato–2nd | Arthur Pingoy Jr. | Lakas–Kampi | Daisy Avance Fuentes | NPC | 23.64% |
| Southern Leyte | Roger Mercado | Lakas–Kampi | Roger Mercado | Lakas–Kampi | 34.02% |
| Sultan Kudarat–1st | Pax Mangudadatu | Lakas–Kampi | Raden Sakaluran | Independent | 40.56% |
| Sultan Kudarat–2nd | Arnold Go | Lakas–Kampi | Arnold Go | Lakas–Kampi | 64.31% |
| Sulu–1st | Yusop Jikiri | NPC | Tupay Loong | Lakas–Kampi | 14.10% |
| Sulu–2nd | Abdulmunir Mundoc Arbison | Lakas–Kampi | Nur-Ana Sahidulla | NPC | 23.89% |
| Surigao del Norte–1st | Francisco Matugas | Lakas–Kampi | Francisco Matugas | Lakas–Kampi | 16.68% |
| Surigao del Norte–2nd | Guillermo Romarate Jr. | Lakas–Kampi | Guillermo Romarate Jr. | Lakas–Kampi | 1.64% |
| Surigao del Sur–1st | Philip Pichay | Lakas–Kampi | Philip Pichay | Lakas–Kampi | 21.08% |
| Surigao del Sur–2nd | Florencio Garay | Nacionalista | Florencio Garay | Nacionalista | 15.68% |
| Taguig–Pateros | Lani Cayetano | Nacionalista | Arnel Cerafica | Liberal | 20.94% |
| Taguig | Henry Dueñas Jr. | Lakas–Kampi | Sigfrido Tiñga | Liberal | 43.87% |
| Tarlac–1st | Monica Prieto-Teodoro | Lakas–Kampi | Henry Cojuangco | NPC | 89.94% |
| Tarlac–2nd | Jose Yap | Lakas–Kampi | Susan Yap | Lakas–Kampi | 27.56% |
| Tarlac–3rd | Jeci Lapus | Lakas–Kampi | Jeci Lapus | Lakas–Kampi | 10.86% |
| Tawi-Tawi | Nur Jaafar | Lakas–Kampi | Nur Jaafar | Lakas–Kampi | 25.78% |
| Valenzuela–1st | Rex Gatchalian | NPC | Rex Gatchalian | NPC | 80.86% |
| Valenzuela–2nd | Magi Gunigundo | Lakas–Kampi | Magi Gunigundo | Lakas–Kampi | 28.20% |
| Zambales–1st | Mitos Magsaysay | Lakas–Kampi | Mitos Magsaysay | Lakas–Kampi | 22.82% |
| Zambales–2nd | Antonio Diaz | LM | Antonio Diaz | LM | 3.35% |
| Zamboanga City–1st | Beng Climaco | Liberal | Beng Climaco | Liberal | 43.13% |
| Zamboanga City–2nd | Erbie Fabian | Nacionalista | Erbie Fabian | Nacionalista | 22.72% |
| Zamboanga del Norte–1st | Cecilia Jalosjos-Carreon | Lakas–Kampi | Bullet Jalosjos | Lakas–Kampi | 62.24% |
| Zamboanga del Norte–2nd | Rosendo Labadlabad | Liberal | Rosendo Labadlabad | Liberal | 2.92% |
| Zamboanga del Norte–3rd | Cesar Jalosjos | Lakas–Kampi | Cesar Jalosjos | Lakas–Kampi | 58.78% |
| Zamboanga del Sur–1st | Victor Yu | NPC | Victor Yu | NPC | 50.44% |
| Zamboanga del Sur–2nd | Antonio Cerilles | Lakas–Kampi | Aurora E. Cerilles | Lakas–Kampi | 62.92% |
| Zamboanga Sibugay–1st | Belma Cabilao | Nacionalista | Jonathan Yambao | Nacionalista | 9.47% |
| Zamboanga Sibugay–2nd | Dulce Ann Hofer | Lakas–Kampi | Jon-jon Jalosjos | Nacionalista | 1.85% |

=== Party-list election ===
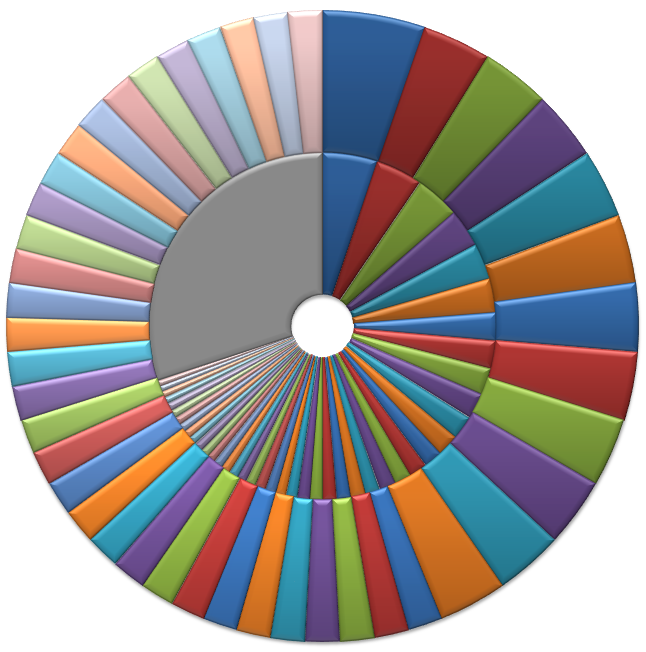
Proportion of votes (inner ring) as compared to the proportion of seats (outer ring). Each party is given one color and one slice, and are arranged in descending order of votes. The parties that did not win a seat is given a single slice and color (gray).

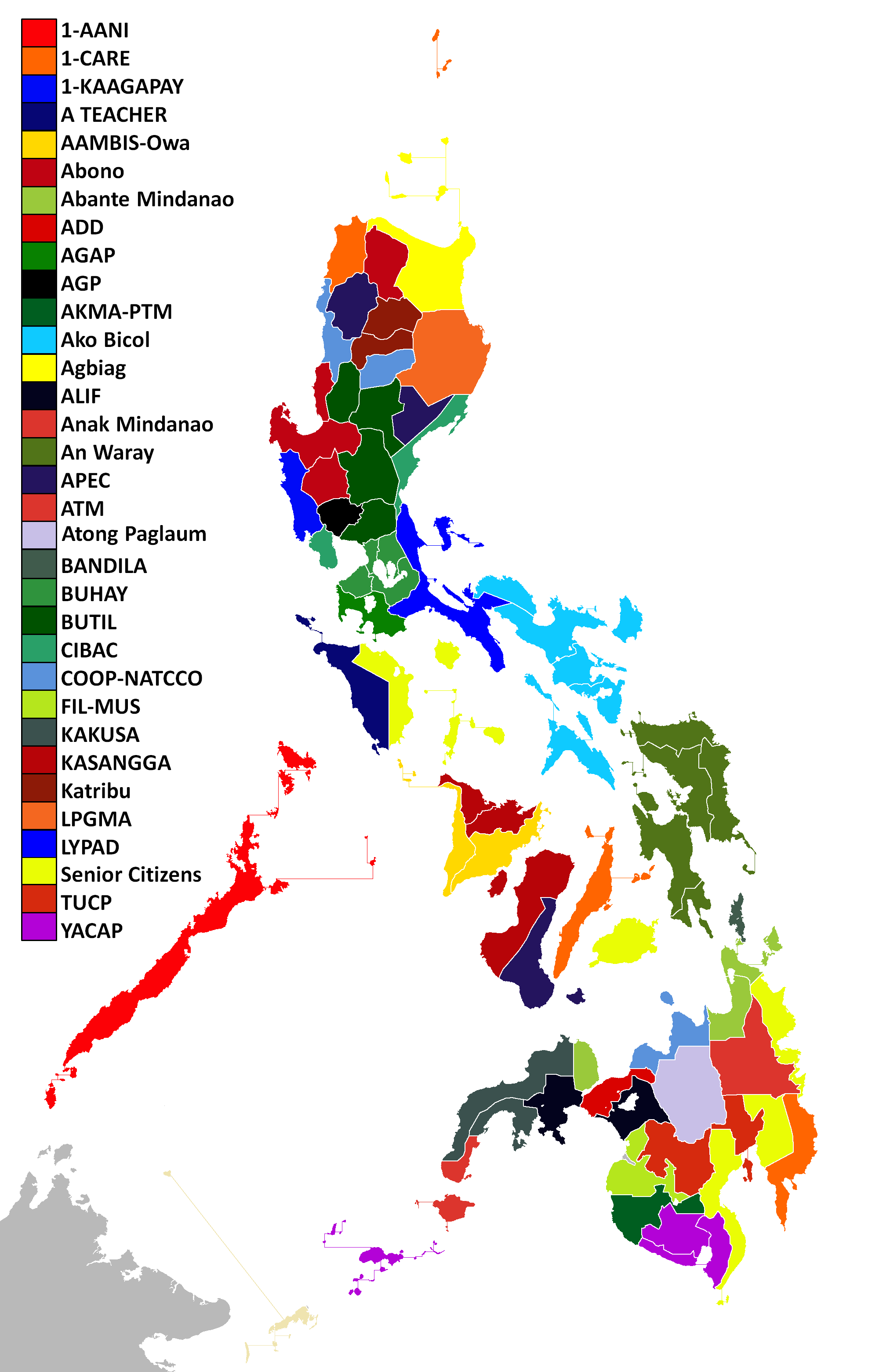
Provincial results: Parties that won at least a plurality of the vote in each province. Note that election is not via per province but nationwide as a single at-large "district".

In party-list elections, parties nominate at least three persons to be their candidates, ranked in order of which they will be seated if elected.

Candidates from the district elections are not allowed to be nominated by the parties participating in the party-list election, nor are parties who have candidates in the district elections may be allowed to join the party-list election; the parties in the party-list election must represent a distinct "sector" in the society such as women, laborers and the like.

In the election, the voter elects the party, not the nominees of the party (closed list). If the party surpasses 2% of the national vote, the person first nominated by the party will be seated. Additional seats can be won depending on the number of votes the party garnered in the election (see the formula), although a party can only win up to three seats. If there are still empty seats, parties with less than 2% of the vote will be ranked in descending order, then will have one seat each until all of the seats have been filled up.

On May 31, the leading parties in the party-list election were declared by the commission as winners; deferred are the parties (not nominees) that have pending disqualification cases against them. According to Ang Galing Pinoy's proclamation, the party of incumbent Pampanga 2nd district representative Mikey Arroyo was recalled as Arroyo has a pending disqualification notice against him, and he is their No. 1 nominee.

| Party | Votes | % | +/– | Seats | +/– |
|---|---|---|---|---|---|
| Ako Bicol Political Party | 1,524,006 | 5.06 | New | 3 | New |
| Senior Citizens Partylist | 1,296,950 | 4.31 | +2.98 | 2 | +1 |
| Buhay Hayaan Yumabong | 1,250,467 | 4.16 | −3.14 | 2 | −1 |
| Akbayan | 1,061,947 | 3.53 | +0.62 | 2 | 0 |
| Gabriela Women's Party | 1,006,752 | 3.35 | −0.53 | 2 | 0 |
| Cooperative NATCCO Network Party | 944,864 | 3.14 | +0.58 | 2 | 0 |
| 1st Consumers Alliance for Rural Energy | 770,015 | 2.56 | New | 2 | New |
| Abono | 766,993 | 2.55 | +0.43 | 2 | 0 |
| Bayan Muna | 750,100 | 2.49 | −3.62 | 2 | −1 |
| An Waray | 712,405 | 2.37 | +0.36 | 2 | 0 |
| Citizens' Battle Against Corruption | 653,399 | 2.17 | −2.55 | 2 | 0 |
| A Teacher Partylist | 617,898 | 2.05 | −1.01 | 2 | 0 |
| Agricultural Sector Alliance of the Philippines | 516,052 | 1.71 | −0.34 | 1 | −1 |
| Butil Farmers Party | 507,091 | 1.69 | −0.86 | 1 | −1 |
| Alliance for Barangay Concerns | 471,407 | 1.57 | +1.01 | 0 | 0 |
| Anakpawis | 447,201 | 1.49 | −0.82 | 1 | −1 |
| Kabataan | 418,776 | 1.39 | −0.04 | 1 | 0 |
| LPG Marketers Association | 417,771 | 1.39 | New | 1 | New |
| Abante Mindanao | 378,345 | 1.26 | New | 1 | New |
| ACT Teachers | 372,903 | 1.24 | New | 1 | New |
| Ang Asosasyon Sang Mangunguma nga Bisaya-Owa Mangunguma | 357,804 | 1.19 | New | 1 | New |
| You Against Corruption and Poverty | 337,487 | 1.12 | −0.95 | 1 | 0 |
| Association of Philippine Electric Cooperatives | 313,689 | 1.04 | −2.83 | 1 | −1 |
| Alliance for Nationalism and Democracy | 297,984 | 0.99 | −0.19 | 1 | 0 |
| Kasangga sa Kaunlaran | 296,695 | 0.99 | −0.07 | 1 | 0 |
| Bagong Henerasyon | 293,079 | 0.97 | New | 1 | New |
| Ang Galing Pinoy | 269,273 | 0.89 | +0.78 | 1 | New |
| Agbiag! Timpuyog Ilocano | 263,234 | 0.87 | +0.55 | 1 | New |
| Puwersa ng Bayaning Atleta | 258,869 | 0.86 | +0.41 | 1 | New |
| Arts, Business and Science Professionals | 257,457 | 0.86 | −0.61 | 1 | 0 |
| Trade Union Congress Party | 245,031 | 0.81 | −0.21 | 1 | 0 |
| Alyansa ng mga Grupong Haligi ng Agham at Teknolohiya Para sa Mamamayan | 242,630 | 0.81 | −0.10 | 1 | New |
| Democratic Independent Workers' Association | 239,029 | 0.79 | +0.12 | 1 | New |
| Kapatiran ng mga Nakulong na Walang Sala | 234,788 | 0.78 | −0.65 | 1 | 0 |
| Kalinga-Advocacy for Social Empowerment and Nation Building Through Easing Poverty | 230,516 | 0.77 | New | 1 | New |
| Ang Laban ng Indigong Filipino | 227,431 | 0.76 | −0.67 | 1 | 0 |
| Alagad | 227,281 | 0.76 | −1.88 | 1 | −1 |
| 1-United Transport Koalisyon | 220,617 | 0.73 | −0.30 | 1 | 0 |
| Una ang Pamilya | 218,181 | 0.73 | +0.11 | 1 | New |
| Alliance of Volunteer Educators | 216,100 | 0.72 | +0.03 | 1 | New |
| Aangat Tayo | 177,503 | 0.59 | −0.66 | 1 | 0 |
| Adhikaing Tinataguyod ng Kooperatiba | 175,636 | 0.58 | New | 1 | New |
| Kasosyo Producer-Consumer Exchange Association | 171,589 | 0.57 | +0.52 | 1 | New |
| Association of Laborers and Employees | 170,543 | 0.57 | New | 1 | New |
| Alay Buhay Community Development Foundation | 164,044 | 0.55 | New | 1 | New |
| Aksyon Magsasaka Partido Tinig ng Masa | 162,972 | 0.54 | New | 0 | 0 |
| Anak Mindanao | 161,418 | 0.54 | −1.63 | 0 | −2 |
| Katipunan ng mga Anak ng Bayan All Filipino Democratic Movement | 161,127 | 0.54 | New | 0 | 0 |
| Veterans Freedom Party | 155,672 | 0.52 | −0.71 | 0 | −1 |
| Alliance for Rural and Agrarian Reconstruction | 147,408 | 0.49 | New | 0 | 0 |
| Atong Paglaum | 146,363 | 0.49 | New | 0 | 0 |
| Pilipino Association for Country-Urban Poor Youth Advancement and Welfare | 143,553 | 0.48 | New | 0 | 0 |
| Abante Tribung Makabansa | 142,988 | 0.48 | New | 0 | 0 |
| Angat Ating Kabuhayan Pilipinas | 142,417 | 0.47 | −0.42 | 0 | 0 |
| Partido ng Manggagawa | 140,257 | 0.47 | −0.27 | 0 | 0 |
| Action for Dynamic Development | 139,494 | 0.46 | +0.16 | 0 | 0 |
| Alyansang Bayanihan ng mga Magsasaka Manggagawang-Bukid at Mangingisda | 138,310 | 0.46 | −0.91 | 0 | −1 |
| Alliance Transport Sector | 136,828 | 0.45 | +0.36 | 0 | 0 |
| Aksyon ng Mamamayang Nagkakaisa | 133,048 | 0.44 | +0.24 | 0 | 0 |
| Kaunlaran ng Agrikultura Asensadong Probinsya Angat ng Bayan | 130,498 | 0.43 | New | 0 | 0 |
| Barangay Natin | 129,089 | 0.43 | −0.67 | 0 | −1 |
| 1Guardians Nationalist of the Philippines | 121,508 | 0.40 | New | 0 | 0 |
| 1-Ako Babaeng Astig Aasenso | 121,405 | 0.40 | New | 0 | 0 |
| Babae Para sa Kaunlaran | 117,518 | 0.39 | +0.16 | 0 | 0 |
| Bagong Bayan na Nagtataguyod ng Demokratikong Ideolohiya at Layunin | 115,964 | 0.39 | +0.05 | 0 | 0 |
| Ahon Pinoy | 115,789 | 0.38 | +0.04 | 0 | 0 |
| Katribu Indigenous People's Sectoral Party | 114,966 | 0.38 | New | 0 | 0 |
| Ang Ladlad | 114,120 | 0.38 | New | 0 | 0 |
| 1-AANI | 113,434 | 0.38 | New | 0 | 0 |
| One Advocacy for Health Progress and Opportunity | 111,495 | 0.37 | New | 0 | 0 |
| Confederation of Non-Stock Savings and Loan Associations | 111,198 | 0.37 | New | 0 | 0 |
| Kabalikat ng Mamamayan | 110,085 | 0.37 | New | 0 | 0 |
| Binhi: Partido ng mga Magsasaka Para sa mga Magsasaka | 108,174 | 0.36 | New | 0 | 0 |
| Akap Bata | 107,478 | 0.36 | New | 0 | 0 |
| Ang Assosiasyon ng mga Trabahador at Pahinante | 107,468 | 0.36 | New | 0 | 0 |
| Agila ng Katutubong Pilipino | 105,406 | 0.35 | New | 0 | 0 |
| Coconut Farmers Association of Linamon, Lanao del Norte | 105,049 | 0.35 | New | 0 | 0 |
| Filipino Muslim Organization | 105,033 | 0.35 | New | 0 | 0 |
| Biyayang Bukid | 102,191 | 0.34 | +0.24 | 0 | 0 |
| Abakada Guro | 97,872 | 0.33 | −0.71 | 0 | −1 |
| Firm 24-K Association | 96,292 | 0.32 | New | 0 | 0 |
| Abante Ilongo | 94,815 | 0.32 | 0.11 | 0 | 0 |
| Ang Kalusugan Para sa Pinoy | 94,209 | 0.31 | New | 0 | 0 |
| Alyansa ng OFW Party | 91,663 | 0.30 | New | 0 | 0 |
| Ako Ayoko sa Bawal na Droga | 90,511 | 0.30 | New | 0 | 0 |
| Action Brotherhood for Active Dreamers | 88,743 | 0.29 | New | 0 | 0 |
| Philippine Coconut Producers Federation | 88,536 | 0.29 | −0.68 | 0 | −1 |
| Ang Tagapagtaguyod ng Sikap sa Ikauunlad ng mga Pinoy | 88,522 | 0.29 | New | 0 | 0 |
| Pro-Active on Climate Change Leaders | 88,457 | 0.29 | New | 0 | 0 |
| Action League of Indigenous Masses | 86,491 | 0.29 | New | 0 | 0 |
| Womenpower | 86,411 | 0.29 | New | 0 | 0 |
| 1st Kabalikat ng Bayan Ginhawang Sangkatauhan | 84,687 | 0.28 | New | 0 | 0 |
| Youth League for Peace and Advancement | 82,642 | 0.27 | +0.22 | 0 | 0 |
| The True Marcos Loyalist (for God Country and People) Association of the Phil. | 81,584 | 0.27 | −0.79 | 0 | −1 |
| Partido ng Katutubong Pilipino | 80,064 | 0.27 | New | 0 | 0 |
| Ang Tao Muna at Bayan | 79,255 | 0.26 | New | 0 | 0 |
| Agapay ng Indigenous Peoples Rights Alliance | 77,270 | 0.26 | New | 0 | 0 |
| Bayani | 74,993 | 0.25 | New | 0 | 0 |
| Alliance of Associations of Accredited Workers in the Water Sector | 74,152 | 0.25 | +0.11 | 0 | 0 |
| Vendors and Traders Alliance of Philippines Party | 74,041 | 0.25 | +0.04 | 0 | 0 |
| Alliance of Mindanao Elders | 71,503 | 0.24 | New | 0 | 0 |
| Alliance of People's Organizations | 70,901 | 0.24 | +0.14 | 0 | 0 |
| Biyaheng Pinoy Labor Association | 70,480 | 0.23 | −0.26 | 0 | 0 |
| Alma sa Pagkahikaos at Ignoransiya | 70,070 | 0.23 | New | 0 | 0 |
| Akbay Pinoy OFW-National | 67,946 | 0.23 | −0.27 | 0 | 0 |
| Champions for Innovative Employment | 67,800 | 0.23 | New | 0 | 0 |
| Organization of Regional Advocates for Good Governance Onward Nation-Building | 67,366 | 0.22 | New | 0 | 0 |
| Parents Enabling Parents Coalition Party | 65,299 | 0.22 | +0.01 | 0 | 0 |
| Ugnayan ng Nagkakaisang Layunin at Adhikaing Dakila | 64,746 | 0.22 | New | 0 | 0 |
| Adhikain ng mga Dakilang Anak Maharlika | 63,065 | 0.21 | New | 0 | 0 |
| A Blessed Federation of Farmers and Fishermen International | 62,529 | 0.21 | New | 0 | 0 |
| Ang Mata'y Alagaan | 62,249 | 0.21 | New | 0 | 0 |
| Sulong! Barangay Movement | 60,606 | 0.20 | −0.02 | 0 | 0 |
| Alliance for Rural Concerns | 57,515 | 0.19 | −2.15 | 0 | −2 |
| Ang Agrikultura Natin Isulong | 57,190 | 0.19 | New | 0 | 0 |
| Alliance of Bicolnon Party | 55,159 | 0.18 | New | 0 | 0 |
| Aabante Emmanuel Civic Association | 54,848 | 0.18 | New | 0 | 0 |
| Adhikain at Kilusan ng Ordinaryong Tao Para sa Lupa Hanapbuhay at Kaunlaran | 54,182 | 0.18 | New | 0 | 0 |
| Action for Democracy and Development for the Tribal People | 53,510 | 0.18 | −0.03 | 0 | 0 |
| Kababaihang Lingkod Bayan sa Pilipinas | 50,466 | 0.17 | New | 0 | 0 |
| Asosasyon ng mga Maliliit na Negosyanteng Gumaganap | 50,127 | 0.17 | −0.10 | 0 | 0 |
| Alliance of Advocates in Mining Advancement for National Progress | 49,990 | 0.17 | New | 0 | 0 |
| Adhikaing Alay ng Marino sa Sambayanan | 49,893 | 0.17 | New | 0 | 0 |
| Agri-Agra Reporma Para sa Magsasaka ng Pilipinas Movement | 49,635 | 0.16 | New | 0 | 0 |
| Alagaan Natin Ating Kalusugan | 47,828 | 0.16 | New | 0 | 0 |
| Batang Iwas sa Droga Foundation | 45,708 | 0.15 | New | 0 | 0 |
| Kalahi Sectoral Party | 45,494 | 0.15 | −0.41 | 0 | 0 |
| Green Force for the Environment-Sons and Daughters of Mother Earth | 44,100 | 0.15 | New | 0 | 0 |
| Advocates for Special Children and Handicapped Movement | 41,809 | 0.14 | −0.18 | 0 | 0 |
| Association for Righteousness Advocacy in Leadership | 41,159 | 0.14 | New | 0 | 0 |
| Ako Agila sa Nagkaisang Magsasaka | 39,448 | 0.13 | New | 0 | 0 |
| Anti War/Anti Terror Mindanao Peace Movement | 38,050 | 0.13 | New | 0 | 0 |
| Yes We Can | 36,819 | 0.12 | New | 0 | 0 |
| Akap Kapatiran Para sa Tangkilikan ng mga Obrero | 36,805 | 0.12 | New | 0 | 0 |
| Sectoral Party of ang Minero (Ang Minero) | 36,650 | 0.12 | New | 0 | 0 |
| Pamilyang OFW-SME Network Foundation | 35,636 | 0.12 | New | 0 | 0 |
| Alliance of Believers Bridge in Attaining Accurate and Meaningful Advancement | 34,852 | 0.12 | New | 0 | 0 |
| Itinerant Vendors Alliance of the Philippines | 34,785 | 0.12 | New | 0 | 0 |
| Pasang Masda Nationwide | 34,769 | 0.12 | New | 0 | 0 |
| Alyansa ng Mamamayang Naghihirap | 32,957 | 0.11 | New | 0 | 0 |
| Bago National Cultural Society of the Philippines | 32,942 | 0.11 | New | 0 | 0 |
| Abang Lingkod | 32,122 | 0.11 | New | 0 | 0 |
| 1-Aangat Ka Pilipino | 32,048 | 0.11 | New | 0 | 0 |
| Sagip Kapwa Foundation | 31,798 | 0.11 | New | 0 | 0 |
| Koalisyon ng mga Katutubong Samahan ng Pilipinas | 31,667 | 0.11 | +0.07 | 0 | 0 |
| Alliance of National Urban Poor Organizations Assembly | 31,330 | 0.10 | New | 0 | 0 |
| Alliance of Regional Coalitions Against People's Poverty | 30,845 | 0.10 | New | 0 | 0 |
| United Movement Against Drugs Foundation | 30,651 | 0.10 | −1.47 | 0 | −1 |
| Free Workers | 30,540 | 0.10 | New | 0 | 0 |
| Small Farmers and Land Tillers Association of the Philippines | 30,001 | 0.10 | New | 0 | 0 |
| Social Movement for Active Reform and Transparency | 28,617 | 0.10 | New | 0 | 0 |
| Agrarian Development Association | 27,521 | 0.09 | New | 0 | 0 |
| First People's Representative for Indigent Student Athletes | 27,229 | 0.09 | New | 0 | 0 |
| Ang Kapisanan ng mga Seaman | 26,805 | 0.09 | New | 0 | 0 |
| Abante Katutubo | 26,593 | 0.09 | New | 0 | 0 |
| Advocates for Penology Enhancement and Legal Assistance | 26,133 | 0.09 | New | 0 | 0 |
| Bagong Koalisyon ng Nagkakaisang Samahan sa Sektor ng Transportasyon | 25,547 | 0.08 | New | 0 | 0 |
| Abante Bicol Oragon | 23,902 | 0.08 | New | 0 | 0 |
| Akbay Kalusugan | 23,394 | 0.08 | New | 0 | 0 |
| Alliance of Nationalistic and Genuine Program for Agricultural Development Towards Economic Reform | 22,218 | 0.07 | New | 0 | 0 |
| Alliance for Community Transformation and Service | 21,475 | 0.07 | New | 0 | 0 |
| Association of Administrator Professionals and Seniors | 20,753 | 0.07 | −0.09 | 0 | 0 |
| Angkan Katutubo | 19,580 | 0.07 | New | 0 | 0 |
| Alyansa Lumad | 19,577 | 0.07 | New | 0 | 0 |
| United Caddies and Green Keepers Association of the Philippines | 19,221 | 0.06 | New | 0 | 0 |
| Damayan Alliance of the Aging and Disabled Filipinos | 19,069 | 0.06 | New | 0 | 0 |
| Bigkis Pinoy Movement | 19,027 | 0.06 | −0.42 | 0 | 0 |
| Alay Serbisyo (Workers in the Informal Sector Economy) | 18,164 | 0.06 | New | 0 | 0 |
| Alyansa ng Media at Showbiz | 17,534 | 0.06 | New | 0 | 0 |
| Alay sa Bayan ng Malayang Propesyonal at Repormang Kalakal | 17,125 | 0.06 | −0.20 | 0 | 0 |
| Alliance for Philippines Security Guards Cooperative | 15,595 | 0.05 | New | 0 | 0 |
| Alyansa ng mga Naulila ng mga Tagapagtanggol ng Bayan | 15,520 | 0.05 | New | 0 | 0 |
| Kabukluran ng mga Kababaihang Filipina sa Timog Katagalugan | 12,430 | 0.04 | −0.02 | 0 | 0 |
| National Council for Commuters Protection | 12,386 | 0.04 | New | 0 | 0 |
| One Nation Empowered By Technology | 12,335 | 0.04 | New | 0 | 0 |
| Ang Partido Demokratiko Rural | 11,680 | 0.04 | New | 0 | 0 |
| Abot Tanaw | 10,473 | 0.03 | New | 0 | 0 |
| A Convergence for Mindanao Agenda | 8,864 | 0.03 | New | 0 | 0 |
| Alliance and Advocates for Senior Citizens' Affairs | 7,379 | 0.02 | New | 0 | 0 |
| Alyansa Lumad Mindanao | 6,612 | 0.02 | New | 0 | 0 |
| United Filipino Seafarers | 6,121 | 0.02 | New | 0 | 0 |
| Binigkis na Interes ng mga Drayber sa Adhikain | 4,963 | 0.02 | New | 0 | 0 |
| Citizen Power Movement | 4,495 | 0.01 | New | 0 | 0 |
| Alliance of Vigilant Protectors of Aquatic Products | 4,324 | 0.01 | New | 0 | 0 |
| Ang Samahan Para sa Magandang Kabuhayan | 4,199 | 0.01 | New | 0 | 0 |
| People's Freedom Party | 3,883 | 0.01 | New | 0 | 0 |
| Ang National Coalition on Indigenous People's Action | 1,217 | 0.00 | New | 0 | 0 |
| Total | 30,092,613 | 100.00 | – | 57 | +4 |
| Valid votes | 30,092,613 | 78.88 | +25.56 | | |
| Invalid/blank votes (Note: Includes 781,319 votes for parties that made it to the ballot but were subsequently disqualified.) | 8,056,758 | 21.12 | −25.56 | | |
| Total votes | 38,149,371 | 100.00 | – | | |
| Registered voters/turnout | 51,317,073 | 74.34 | +4.73 | | |
Source: COMELEC

=== Details ===
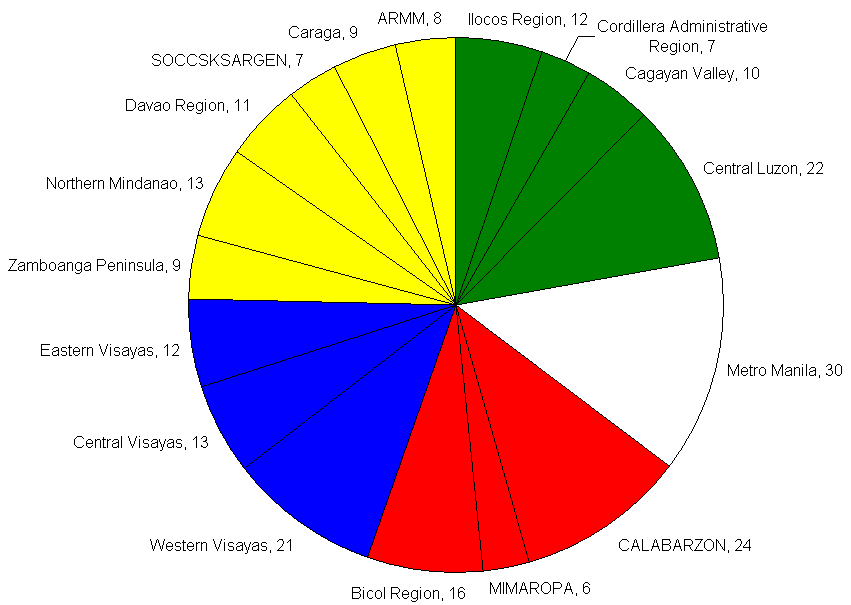
Allocation of seats per region: green is for Regions I to III and CAR, white is for Metro Manila, red is for Regions IV-A to V, blue is for Regions VI to VIII and yellow is for Regions IX to XIII and the ARMM.

Shading refers to the party that won a plurality of seats:

| Region | Details | Seats won per party | | | | | Total seats |
| Region | Details | Lakas | Liberal | Nacionalista | NPC | Others & ind. | Total seats |
|---|---|---|---|---|---|---|---|
| I | Elections | 6 / 12 | 0 / 12 | 1 / 12 | 4 / 12 | 1 / 12 | 12 / 287 |
| II | Elections | 5 / 10 | 1 / 10 | 2 / 10 | 2 / 10 | 0 / 10 | 10 / 287 |
| III | Elections | 14 / 21 | 2 / 21 | 1 / 21 | 2 / 21 | 2 / 21 | 21 / 287 |
| IV–A | Elections | 6 / 23 | 8 / 23 | 3 / 23 | 4 / 23 | 2 / 23 | 23 / 287 |
| IV–B | Elections | 4 / 7 | 1 / 7 | 1 / 7 | 1 / 7 | 0 / 7 | 7 / 287 |
| V | Elections | 7 / 16 | 4 / 16 | 2 / 16 | 3 / 16 | 0 / 16 | 16 / 287 |
| VI | Elections | 9 / 18 | 2 / 18 | 2 / 18 | 5 / 18 | 0 / 18 | 18 / 287 |
| VII | Elections | 8 / 16 | 3 / 16 | 1 / 16 | 2 / 16 | 2 / 16 | 16 / 287 |
| VIII | Elections | 8 / 12 | 2 / 12 | 1 / 12 | 0 / 12 | 1 / 12 | 12 / 287 |
| IX | Elections | 3 / 9 | 2 / 9 | 3 / 9 | 1 / 9 | 0 / 9 | 9 / 287 |
| X | Elections | 6 / 13 | 2 / 13 | 1 / 13 | 1 / 13 | 3 / 13 | 13 / 287 |
| XI | Elections | 5 / 11 | 2 / 11 | 3 / 11 | 0 / 11 | 1 / 11 | 11 / 287 |
| XII | Elections | 3 / 7 | 0 / 7 | 1 / 7 | 2 / 7 | 1 / 7 | 7 / 287 |
| Caraga | Elections | 8 / 9 | 0 / 9 | 1 / 9 | —N/a | 0 / 9 | 9 / 287 |
| ARMM | Elections | 6 / 8 | 0 / 8 | 0 / 8 | 1 / 8 | 1 / 8 | 8 / 287 |
| CAR | Elections | 4 / 7 | 2 / 7 | 0 / 7 | 0 / 7 | 1 / 7 | 7 / 287 |
| NCR | Elections | 5 / 30 | 14 / 30 | 3 / 30 | 3 / 30 | 5 / 30 | 30 / 287 |
| Party-list | Election | —N/a | —N/a | —N/a | —N/a | 57 / 57 | 57 / 287 |
| Total | | 107 / 287 | 45 / 287 | 26 / 287 | 30 / 287 | 78 / 287 | 287 / 287 |

== Defeated incumbents ==
| District | Party | Incumbent | Winner | Party |
|---|---|---|---|---|
| Abra | Lakas–Kampi | Cecilia Seares-Luna | Joy Bernos-Valera | PDSP |
| Albay–3rd | NPC | Reno Lim | Fernando Gonzalez | Liberal |
| Batanes | Lakas–Kampi | Carlo Oliver Diasnes | Dina Abad | Liberal |
| Biliran | Lakas–Kampi | Glenn Chong | Rogelio Espina | Nacionalista |
| Bukidnon–2nd | Lakas–Kampi | Candido Pancrudo Jr. | Jesus Emmanuel Paras | NPC |
| Camarines Norte–2nd | Liberal | Liwayway Vinzons-Chato | Elmer Panotes | Lakas–Kampi |
| Cotabato–1st | Liberal | Bernardo Piñol Jr. | Nancy Catamco | Lakas–Kampi |
| Eastern Samar | Independent | Teodulo Coquilla | Ben Evardone | Independent |
| Iloilo City | Lakas–Kampi | Raul Gonzalez Jr. | Jerry Treñas | Nacionalista |
| Maguindanao–1st | Independent | Didagen Dilangalen | Bai Sandra Sema | Lakas–Kampi |
| Manila–6th | Lakas–Kampi | Bienvenido Abante Jr. | Rosenda Ocampo | KKK |
| Pasay | Lakas–Kampi | Jose Antonio Roxas | Imelda Calixto-Rubiano | Liberal |
| Quezon City–3rd | Lakas–Kampi | Matias Defensor Jr. | Jorge Banal Jr. | Liberal |
| Sultan Kudarat–1st | Lakas–Kampi | Pax Mangudadatu | Raden Sakaluran | Independent |
| Sulu–1st | NPC | Yusop Jikiri | Tupay Loong | Lakas–Kampi |
| Taguig–2nd | Lingkod Taguig | Angelito Reyes | Sigfrido Tinga | Liberal |

== Open seat gains ==
1. Antipolo's 2nd legislative district (Independent gain)
2. Bacolod's legislative district (NPC gain)
3. Basilan's legislative district (Independent gain)
4. Batangas's 1st legislative district (Liberal gain)
5. Batangas's 3rd legislative district (PMP gain)
6. Benguet's legislative district (Liberal gain)
7. Bohol's 1st legislative district (LDP gain)
8. Bohol's 2nd legislative district (Nacionalista gain)
9. Bukidnon's 2nd legislative district (Lakas Kampi CMD gain)
10. Bulacan's 3rd legislative district (Liberal gain)
11. Bulacan's 4th legislative district (Liberal gain)
12. Cagayan's 3rd legislative district (Lakas Kampi CMD gain)
13. Cagayan de Oro's 1st legislative district (PMP gain)
14. Cebu City's 2nd legislative district (Liberal gain)
15. Ilocos Norte's 1st legislative district (Nacionalista gain)
16. Ilocos Norte's 2nd legislative district (KBL gain)
17. Lanao del Norte's 1st legislative district (Lakas Kampi CMD gain)
18. Leyte's 4th legislative district (Liberal gain)
19. Marinduque's legislative district (Lakas Kampi CMD gain)
20. Misamis Oriental's legislative district (PMP gain)
21. North Cotabato's 2nd legislative district (Lakas Kampi CMD gain)
22. Pangasinan's 4th legislative district (NPC gain)
23. Parañaque's 1st legislative district (Liberal gain)
24. Pateros/Taguig's legislative district (Liberal gain)
25. Quezon City's 1st legislative district (Liberal gain)
26. San Juan's legislative district (PMP gain)
27. Sarangani's legislative district (Nacionalista gain)
28. Sorsogon's 2nd legislative district (Liberal gain)
29. South Cotabato's 2nd legislative district (NPC gain)
30. Tarlac's 1st legislative district (NPC gain)

== Aftermath ==
Several congressmen-elect have already defected to the Liberal Party as response to Noynoy Aquino's victory in the presidential election. This comes as Negros Occidental representative Iggy Arroyo said that Lakas Kampi CMD has the number to elect his sister-in-law and representative-elect President Gloria Macapagal Arroyo as speaker as she is pushed by to run for the speakership. Congressman-elect and former speaker Feliciano Belmonte Jr. (formerly of Lakas Kampi) has emerged to be the Liberal Party's leading candidate for speaker. The anti-Arroyo representatives have formed the Conscience and Reform (CORE) coalition to strengthen their ranks.

However, Arroyo had repeatedly declined Lakas Kampi's prodding to run for speaker. Three Lakas Kampi congressmen instead made themselves available to run for speaker: Edcel Lagman (Albay), Danilo Suarez (Quezon) and Elpidio Barzaga Jr. (Dasmariñas) in a party caucus. It was agreed upon that while Arroyo "will still call the shots," Lagman will run for the speakership, and if elected, will serve for the first 18 months, then Suarez will serve the remainder.

On June 25, the Liberal Party swore in congressmen as new members, mostly defecting from Lakas-Kampi. Most Lakas-Kampi congressmen jumpred ship after Arroyo declined being their party's candidate for speaker. With the House "tradition" in which congressmen align themselves with the party of the president, Belmonte now has at least 150 congressmen pledging support for him, including 75 from the Liberal Party, members of the Nationalist People's Coalition (NPC), Nacionalistas, PDP–Laban, party-list groups, and "some 55" members of the Lakas-Kampi independent bloc.

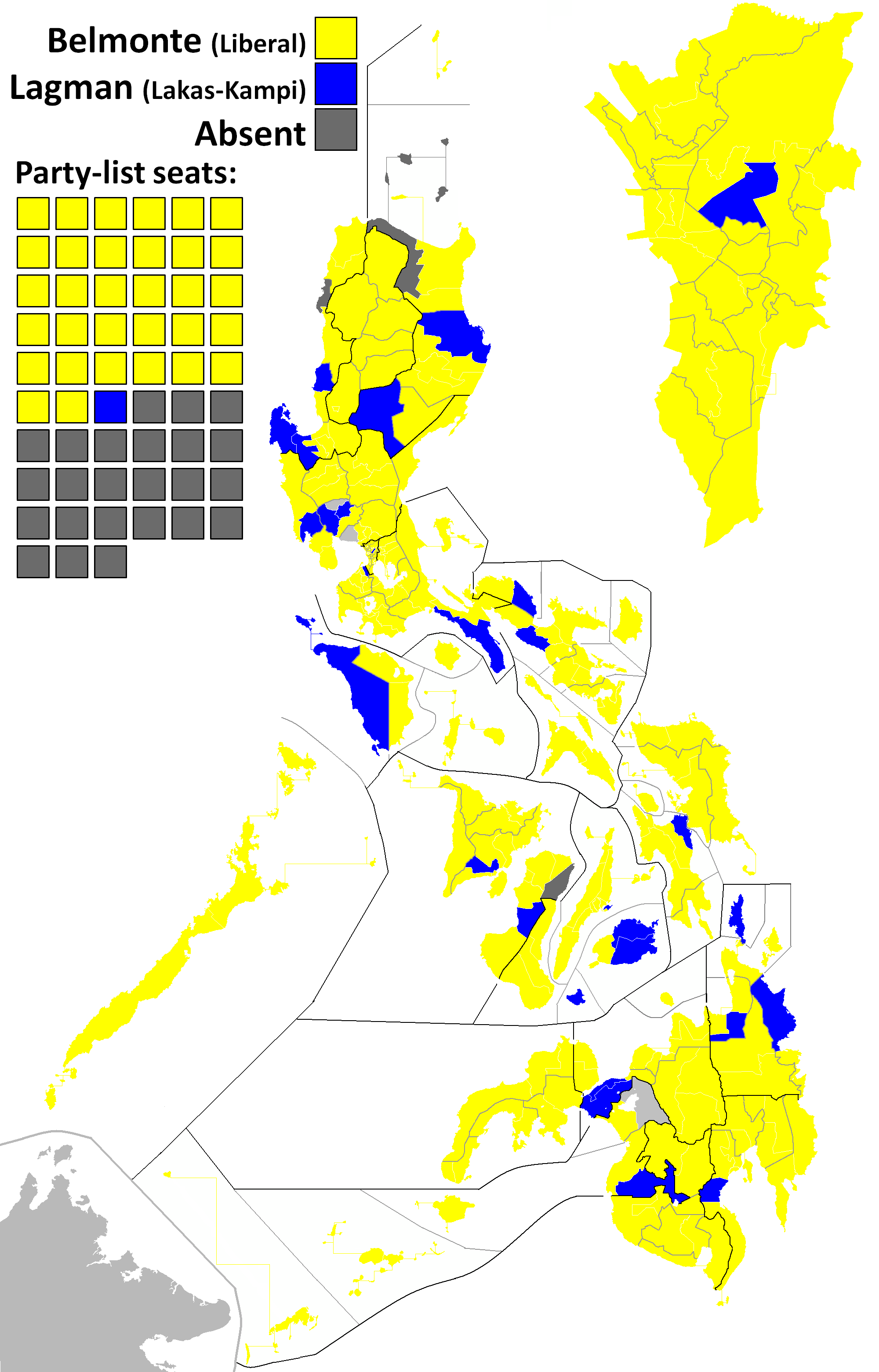
Results of the speaker's election. The two competing candidates, by tradition, vote for each other.

The House of Representatives convened on July 26, with Joseph Emilio Abaya (Cavite) nominating Belmonte for Speaker; Rodolfo Albano (Isabela), Danilo Suarez (Quezon) and Augusto Syjuco (Iloilo) nominated Lagman. Belmonte was elected Speaker with 227 votes, while Lagman got 29 votes.

Speakership election
| Party | Belmonte | Lagman | Total |
|---|---|---|---|
| Lakas–Kampi | 19* | 26 | 45 |
| Nacionalista | 21 | 1 | 22 |
| Other district representatives | 161 | 1* | 162 |
| Party-list representatives | 26 | 1 | 27 |
| Totals | 227 | 29 | 256 |

*Belmonte and Lagman voted for each other.

=== Special elections ===
- Bulacan–1st (November 13, 2010): Incumbent Ma. Victoria Sy-Alvarado won with almost 70% of the vote over Roberto Pagdanganan. Note that this is considered a part of general election, only that it was delayed for several months.
- Cagayan–2nd (March 12, 2011): Florencio Vargas of Cagayan's 2nd district died prior to the convening of Congress. A special election was held with Vargas' daughter, Baby Aline Vargas-Alfonso beating Edgar Lara.
- Ilocos Sur–1st (May 28, 2011): Ronald Singson of Ilocos Sur's 1st district resigned after being convicted of drug possession at Hong Kong. Singson's brother, Vigan vice mayor Ryan Singson beat Randy Baterina at the special election.
- Zambales–2nd (February 4, 2012): Antonio M. Diaz of Zambales's 2nd district died. Governor Hermogenes Ebdane's son Jun Omar Ebdane beat Cheryl Deloso-Montalla at the special election.
- Negros Occidental–5th (June 2, 2012): Ignacio Arroyo of Negros Occidental's 5th district died. Binalbagan mayor Alejandro Mirasol beat Emilio Yulo III at the special election.
