= 2010 Philippine House of Representatives elections in Northern Mindanao =

Philippine House of Representatives elections in Northern Mindanao, 2010
- May 10, 2010

13 seats of Northern Mindanao in the House of Representatives
	First party	Second party	Third party
Party	Lakas–Kampi	Liberal	PMP
Seats won	6	2	3
Popular vote	754,523	378,031	212,815
Percentage	45.14%	22.62%	12.73%
	Fourth party	Fifth party
Party	Nacionalista	NPC
Seats won	1	1`
Popular vote	164,613	109,913
Percentage	9.85%	6.58%
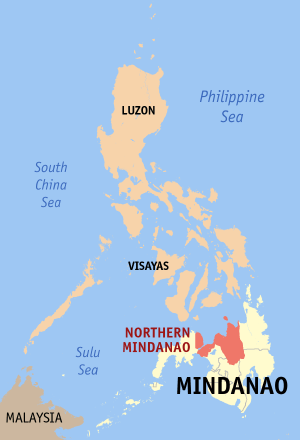
- Location of Northern Mindanao within the country.

Elections were held in Northern Mindanao for seats in the House of Representatives of the Philippines on May 10, 2010.

The candidate with the most votes won that district's seat for the 15th Congress of the Philippines.

== Summary ==
Party	Popular vote	%	Seats won
Lakas–Kampi	754,523	45.14%	3
Liberal	378,031	22.62%	2
PMP	212,815	12.73%	3
Nacionalista	164,613	9.85%	1
NPC	109,913	6.58%	1
KBL	362	0.02%	0
Independent	51,157	3.06%	0
Valid votes	1,671,414	94.53%	13
Invalid votes	96,747	5.47%	
Turnout	1,768,171	72.89%	
Registered voters	2,425,957	100.00%	

== Bukidnon ==
=== 1st District ===
Candido Pancrudo, Jr. is the incumbent.

The result of the election is under protest in the House of Representatives Electoral Tribunal.

Candidate	Party	Votes	%
Jesus Emmanuel Paras	Nationalist People's Coalition	76,432	50.25
Candido Pancrudo Jr. (incumbent)	Lakas–Kampi–CMD	50,149	32.97
Socorro Acosta	Liberal Party	23,829	15.67
Daniel Onahon	Pwersa ng Masang Pilipino	1,703	1.12
Total		152,113	100.00
Valid votes		152,113	92.46
Invalid/blank votes		12,403	7.54
Total votes		164,516	100.00
Nationalist People's Coalition gain from Lakas–Kampi–CMD			
Source: Commission on Elections

=== 2nd District ===
Incumbent Teofisto Guingona III will run for Senate. Wenifredo Agripo is the Liberal Party's nominee for the district's seat.

Candidate	Party	Votes	%
Florencio Flores Jr.	Lakas–Kampi–CMD	120,283	66.04
Wenifredo Agripo	Liberal Party	51,660	28.36
Joan Mae Dichosa	Independent	6,122	3.36
Erwin Marte	Pwersa ng Masang Pilipino	2,835	1.56
Fernando Ma. Carrascoso III	Independent	1,233	0.68
Total		182,133	100.00
Valid votes		182,133	87.21
Invalid/blank votes		26,712	12.79
Total votes		208,845	100.00
Lakas–Kampi–CMD gain from Liberal Party			
Source: Commission on Elections

=== 3rd District ===
Jose Zubiri III is the incumbent.

Candidate	Party	Votes	%
Jose Zubiri III (incumbent)	Lakas–Kampi–CMD	132,682	89.87
Salvador Galon	Pwersa ng Masang Pilipino	12,456	8.44
Delia Arroyo	Independent	2,507	1.70
Total		147,645	100.00
Valid votes		147,645	83.54
Invalid/blank votes		29,092	16.46
Total votes		176,737	100.00
Lakas–Kampi–CMD hold			
Source: Commission on Elections

== Cagayan de Oro ==
=== 1st District ===
Incumbent Rolando Uy (switched to Lakas Kampi CMD from Nacionalista) will run for mayor of Cagayan de Oro. Rainier Uy is running in his stead, but as Lakas-Kampi-CMD's candidate.

Candidate	Party	Votes	%
Jose Benjamin Benaldo	Pwersa ng Masang Pilipino	31,652	34.66
Rainier Joaquin Uy	Lakas–Kampi–CMD	29,872	32.72
Lourdes Candy Darimbang	Independent	26,298	28.80
Tito Dichosa	Independent	2,134	2.34
Dulcisimo Ytem Sr.	Independent	1,353	1.48
Total		91,309	100.00
Valid votes		91,309	93.41
Invalid/blank votes		6,438	6.59
Total votes		97,747	100.00
Pwersa ng Masang Pilipino gain from Lakas–Kampi–CMD			
Source: Commission on Elections

=== 2nd District ===
Rufus Rodriguez is the incumbent.

Candidate	Party	Votes	%
Rufus Rodriguez (incumbent)	Pwersa ng Masang Pilipino	100,059	96.88
Samuel Aloysius Jardin	Liberal Party	2,798	2.71
Alrhoy Naliponguit	Independent	426	0.41
Total		103,283	100.00
Valid votes		103,283	89.57
Invalid/blank votes		12,027	10.43
Total votes		115,310	100.00
Pwersa ng Masang Pilipino hold			
Source: Commission on Elections

== Camiguin ==
Pedro Romualdo is the incumbent.

Candidate	Party	Votes	%
Pedro Romualdo (incumbent)	Lakas–Kampi–CMD	35,223	77.42
Florencio Narido Jr.	Liberal Party	10,274	22.58
Total		45,497	100.00
Valid votes		45,497	97.15
Invalid/blank votes		1,333	2.85
Total votes		46,830	100.00
Lakas–Kampi–CMD hold			
Source: Commission on Elections

== Iligan ==
Iligan will have their first representative alone for the first time since 1984. Iligan was formerly grouped with Lanao del Norte's 1st district. Incumbent 1st district of Lanao del Norte representative Vicente Belmonte Jr. will run in this district.

Candidate	Party	Votes	%
Vicente Belmonte Jr.	Liberal Party	86,786	92.20
Samson Dajao	Independent	4,550	4.83
Jose Pantoja	Pwersa ng Masang Pilipino	2,789	2.96
Total		94,125	100.00
Valid votes		94,125	95.03
Invalid/blank votes		4,926	4.97
Total votes		99,051	100.00
Liberal Party gain			
Source: Commission on Elections

== Lanao del Norte ==
=== 1st District ===
Incumbent Vicente Belmonte Jr. is running for representative from Iligan. The Liberal Party nominated Romulo Rizalda to run in this district.

Candidate	Party	Votes	%
Imelda Dimaporo	Lakas–Kampi–CMD	70,631	68.74
Romulo Rizalda	Liberal Party	26,160	25.46
Rangiit Gedren Amesola	Independent	4,077	3.97
Tito Dichosa	Independent	1,879	1.83
Total		102,747	100.00
Valid votes		102,747	88.70
Invalid/blank votes		13,088	11.30
Total votes		115,835	100.00
Lakas–Kampi–CMD gain from Liberal Party			
Source: Commission on Elections

=== 2nd District ===
Incumbent Abdullah Dimaporo is in his third consecutive term already and is ineligible for reelection. His daughter Fatima is his party's nominee for the district's seat while his wife, former governor Imelda Dimaporo is his party's nominee for the first district.

Candidate	Party	Votes	%
Fatima Aliah Dimaporo	Lakas–Kampi–CMD	119,614	84.80
Tingagun Umpa	Liberal Party	21,442	15.20
Total		141,056	100.00
Valid votes		141,056	92.61
Invalid/blank votes		11,250	7.39
Total votes		152,306	100.00
Lakas–Kampi–CMD hold			
Source: Commission on Elections

== Misamis Occidental ==
=== 1st District ===
Marina Clarete is not running; her husband Ernie is her party's nominee for this district.

Candidate	Party	Votes	%
Jorge Almonte	Lakas–Kampi–CMD	62,778	50.61
Ernie Clarete	Nacionalista Party	61,276	49.39
Total		124,054	100.00
Valid votes		124,054	94.65
Invalid/blank votes		7,011	5.35
Total votes		131,065	100.00
Lakas–Kampi–CMD gain from Nacionalista Party			
Source: Commission on Elections

=== 2nd District ===
Incumbent Herminia Ramiro is on her third consecutive term already and is ineligible for reelection.

Candidate	Party	Votes	%
Loreto Leo Ocampos	Liberal Party	50,131	37.60
Reynaldo Parojinog Sr.	Lakas–Kampi–CMD	49,140	36.86
Jennifer Tan	Nationalist People's Coalition	33,481	25.11
Alfredo Paglinawan	Independent	576	0.43
Total		133,328	100.00
Valid votes		133,328	94.46
Invalid/blank votes		7,818	5.54
Total votes		141,146	100.00
Liberal Party gain from Lakas–Kampi–CMD			
Source: Commission on Elections

== Misamis Oriental ==
=== 1st District ===
Incumbent Danilo Lagbas (Lakas-CMD) died on June 7, 2008, leaving the seat vacant. The successor party of Lakas-CMD, Lakas-Kampi-CMD nominated Genaro Jose Moreno, Jr., while Lagbas' daughter Jennifer is the Liberal Party's nominee.

Candidate	Party	Votes	%
Peter Unabia	Pwersa ng Masang Pilipino	61,321	39.79
Genaro Jose Moreno Jr.	Lakas–Kampi–CMD	47,668	30.93
Jennifer Lagbas	Liberal Party	43,389	28.16
Wevino Palamine	Independent	1,355	0.88
Rommel Zagado	Kilusang Bagong Lipunan	362	0.23
Total		154,095	100.00
Valid votes		154,095	88.29
Invalid/blank votes		20,443	11.71
Total votes		174,538	100.00
Pwersa ng Masang Pilipino gain from Lakas–Kampi–CMD			
Source: Commission on Elections

=== 2nd District ===
Yevgeny Emano is the incumbent.

Candidate	Party	Votes	%
Yevgeny Emano (incumbent)	Nacionalista Party	103,337	51.66
Augusto Baculio	Liberal Party	60,209	30.10
Julio Uy	Lakas–Kampi–CMD	36,483	18.24
Total		200,029	100.00
Valid votes		200,029	89.77
Invalid/blank votes		22,788	10.23
Total votes		222,817	100.00
Nacionalista Party hold			
Source: Commission on Elections
