= 2010 Philippine House of Representatives elections in Soccsksargen =

Philippine House of Representatives elections in Soccsksargen, 2010
- May 10, 2010

7 seats of Soccsksargen in the House of Representatives
	First party	Second party
Party	Lakas–Kampi	NPC
Seats won	3	2
Popular vote	388,881	345,289
Percentage	30.64%	27.21%
	Third party	Fourth party
Party	Liberal	PCM
Seats won	0	1
Popular vote	158,311	120,052
Percentage	12.74%	9.46%
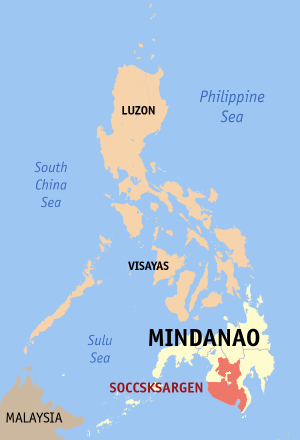
- Location of Soccsksargen within the country.

Elections were held in Soccsksargen for seats in the House of Representatives of the Philippines on May 10, 2010.

The candidate with the most votes won that district's seat for the 15th Congress of the Philippines.

Note that in Cotabato City, although a part of this region, the voters elect their representative via Maguindanao's 1st district. Cotabato City is independent from any province and is a part of the Soccsksargen region, but is usually grouped with Maguindanao by the National Statistics Office.

== Summary ==
Party	Popular vote	%	Seats won
Lakas–Kampi	388,881	30.64%	3
NPC	345,289	27.21%	2
Liberal	158,311	12.47%	0
PCM	120,052	9.46%	1
SARRO	60,899	4.80%	0
GAD	47,677	3.76%	0
Independent	148,047	11.66%	1
Valid votes	1,269,156	91.90%	7
Invalid votes	111,894	8.10%	
Turnout	1,381,050	69.20%	
Registered voters	1,995,877	100.00%	

== Cotabato ==
=== 1st District ===
Incumbent Emmylou Taliño-Mendoza is in her third consecutive term already and is ineligible for reelection; she is running as governor of Cotabato. Lakas-Kampi-CMD nominated incumbent governor Jesus Sacdalan as their nominee in this district.

Candidate	Party	Votes	%
Jesus Sacdalan	Lakas–Kampi–CMD	88,683	42.75
Anthony Dequiña	Nationalist People's Coalition	51,097	24.63
Luzviminda Tan	Grand Alliance for Democracy	47,677	22.99
Ronaldo Pader	Liberal Party	18,502	8.92
Dan Ebo	Independent	1,467	0.71
Total		207,426	100.00
Valid votes		207,426	94.16
Invalid/blank votes		12,854	5.84
Total votes		220,280	100.00
Lakas–Kampi–CMD hold			
Source: Commission on Elections

=== 2nd District ===
Bernardo Piñol Jr. is the incumbent.

The result of the election is under protest in the House of Representatives Electoral Tribunal.

Candidate	Party	Votes	%
Nancy Catamco	Lakas–Kampi–CMD	119,294	51.44
Bernardo Piñol Jr. (incumbent)	Liberal Party	112,617	48.56
Total		231,911	100.00
Valid votes		231,911	97.20
Invalid/blank votes		6,691	2.80
Total votes		238,602	100.00
Lakas–Kampi–CMD hold			
Source: Commission on Elections

== Sarangani ==
World-renowned boxer Manny Pacquiao is running once again after being defeated in South Cotabato's congressional race to incumbent Rep. Darlene Antonino-Custodio in 2007. As such, he moved to Sarangani and is vying for its open congressional seat left by out going Rep. Erwin Chiongbian. Pacquiao is running his own People's Champ Movement which is co-endorsed by the Nacionalista Party. He will face Rep. Chiongbian's third brother, Roy Chiongbian, a local businessman. Chiongbian is co-endorsed by the local Sarangani Reconciliation and Reformation Organization and Lakas Kampi CMD.

Candidate	Party	Votes	%
Manny Pacquiao	People's Champ Movement	120,052	66.35
Roy Chiongbian	Sarangani Reconciliation and Reformation Organization	60,899	33.65
Total		180,951	100.00
Valid votes		180,951	97.57
Invalid/blank votes		4,499	2.43
Total votes		185,450	100.00
People's Champ Movement gain from Sarangani Reconciliation and Reformation Organization			
Source: Commission on Elections

== South Cotabato ==
=== 1st District ===
The highly urbanized city of General Santos is a part of South Cotabato's first district.

Incumbent Darlene Antonino-Custodio, on her third consecutive term, is term-limited and chose to run for Mayor of General Santos. The Nationalist People's Coalition nominated General Santos mayor Pedro Acharon Jr. in this district.

Candidate	Party	Votes	%
Pedro Acharon Jr.	Nationalist People's Coalition	163,590	69.03
Ramon Melliza	Independent	51,306	21.65
Rogelio Garcia	Liberal Party	14,053	5.93
Franklin Gacal Jr.	Independent	6,327	2.67
Aldwin Angangan	Independent	985	0.42
Abelardo Plaza	Independent	731	0.31
Total		236,992	100.00
Valid votes		236,992	91.61
Invalid/blank votes		21,694	8.39
Total votes		258,686	100.00
Nationalist People's Coalition hold			
Source: Commission on Elections

=== 2nd District ===
Incumbent Arthur Pingoy Jr. is in his third consecutive term already and is ineligible for reelection and running for governor. Lakas-Kampi-CMD nominated Hilario de Pedro III in this district.

Candidate	Party	Votes	%
Daisy Fuentes	Nationalist People's Coalition	130,602	61.82
Hilario de Pedro III	Lakas–Kampi–CMD	80,653	38.18
Total		211,255	100.00
Valid votes		211,255	94.88
Invalid/blank votes		11,395	5.12
Total votes		222,650	100.00
Nationalist People's Coalition gain from Lakas–Kampi–CMD			
Source: Commission on Elections

== Sultan Kudarat ==
=== 1st District ===
Pax Mangudadatu is the incumbent.

Candidate	Party	Votes	%
Raden Sakaluran	Independent	66,979	70.28
Pax Mangudadatu (incumbent)	Lakas–Kampi–CMD	28,324	29.72
Total		95,303	100.00
Valid votes		95,303	69.36
Invalid/blank votes		42,100	30.64
Total votes		137,403	100.00
Independent gain from Lakas–Kampi–CMD			
Source: Commission on Elections

=== 2nd District ===
Arnold Go is the incumbent.

Candidate	Party	Votes	%
Arnold Go (incumbent)	Lakas–Kampi–CMD	71,927	73.64
Reynaldo Arguelles	Independent	9,113	9.33
Nesthur Gumana	Independent	7,800	7.99
Jacqueline Talmadge	Liberal Party	5,498	5.63
Roberto Examen	Independent	3,339	3.42
Total		97,677	100.00
Valid votes		97,677	88.53
Invalid/blank votes		12,661	11.47
Total votes		110,338	100.00
Lakas–Kampi–CMD hold			
Source: Commission on Elections
