= 2010 Philippine House of Representatives elections in the Davao Region =

Philippine House of Representatives elections in the Davao Region, 2010
- May 10, 2010

11 seats of the Davao Region in the House of Representatives
	First party	Second party	Third party
Party	Lakas–Kampi	Liberal	Nacionalista
Seats won	5	2	3
Popular vote	563,779	363,340	351,924
Percentage	34.99%	22.55%	21.84%
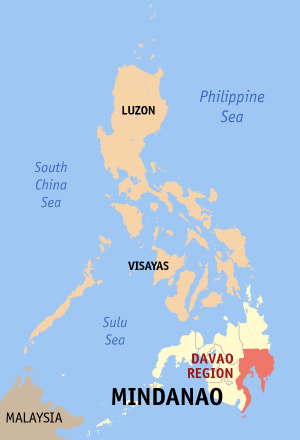
- Location of Northern Mindanao within the country.

Elections were held in the Davao Region for seats in the House of Representatives of the Philippines on May 10, 2010.

The candidate with the most votes won that district's seat for the 15th Congress of the Philippines.

== Summary ==
Party	Popular vote	%	Seats won
Lakas–Kampi	563,779	34.99%	5
Liberal	363,340	22.55%	2
Nacionalista	351,924	21.84%	3
NPC	118,656	7.36%	0
PDP–Laban	64,515	4.00%	0
Aksyon	44,100	2.74%	0
LMWPP	8,894	0.55%	0
PMP	2,180	0.14%	0
Independent	94,030	5.84%	1
Valid votes	1,611,418	90.83%	11
Invalid votes	162,595	9.17%	
Turnout	1,774,013	69.02%	
Registered voters	2,570,106	100.00%	

== Compostela Valley ==
=== 1st District ===
Manuel Zamora (popularly known as Way Kurat) is the incumbent. But he is ineligible for re-election since he is on his third consecutive term already. Board member Maricar Apsay will run in his place. Cesar Mancao is co-nominated by the Liberal Party.

Candidate	Party	Votes	%
Maricar Zamora	Lakas–Kampi–CMD	65,819	56.09
Cezar Mancao	Aksyon Demokratiko	44,100	37.58
Jaime Lopoz Jr.	Liberal Party	7,417	6.32
Total		117,336	100.00
Valid votes		117,336	96.06
Invalid/blank votes		4,810	3.94
Total votes		122,146	100.00
Lakas–Kampi–CMD hold			
Source: Commission on Elections

=== 2nd District ===
Rommel Amatong is the incumbent.

Candidate	Party	Votes	%
Rommel Amatong (incumbent)	Lakas–Kampi–CMD	88,997	66.19
Jose Caballero	Liberal Party	44,612	33.18
Rex Jasper Lopoz	Independent	850	0.63
Total		134,459	100.00
Valid votes		134,459	95.03
Invalid/blank votes		7,030	4.97
Total votes		141,489	100.00
Lakas–Kampi–CMD hold			
Source: Commission on Elections

== Davao City ==
=== 1st District ===
Incumbent Prospero Nograles is in his third consecutive term and is ineligible for reelection; he is running for mayor of Davao City. His son Karlo is his party's nominee for the seat. Maria Belen Acosta is also nominated by local party Hugpong sa Tawong Lungsod.

Candidate	Party	Votes	%
Karlo Nograles	Lakas–Kampi–CMD	99,586	47.64
Maria Belen Acosta	Liberal Party	91,414	43.74
Jocelyn Duterte	Independent	11,859	5.67
Robert Olanolan	Independent	5,345	2.56
Juan Zamora	Independent	347	0.17
Bernard Custodio	Independent	266	0.13
Anacleto Millendez	Independent	200	0.10
Total		209,017	100.00
Valid votes		209,017	93.93
Invalid/blank votes		13,503	6.07
Total votes		222,520	100.00
Lakas–Kampi–CMD hold			
Source: Commission on Elections

=== 2nd District ===
Incumbent Vincent Garcia is in his third consecutive term and is ineligible for reelection; his sister Mylene is his party's nominee for the seat and is also nominated by local party Hugpong sa Tawong Lungsod but is an independent.

The result of the election is under protest in the House of Representatives Electoral Tribunal.

Candidate	Party	Votes	%
Mylene Garcia	Independent	61,887	34.34
Diosdado Mahipus	PDP–Laban	42,625	23.65
Joji Bian	Lakas–Kampi–CMD	41,638	23.10
Danny Dayanghirang	Liberal Party	33,572	18.63
Dexter Alcebar	Independent	494	0.27
Total		180,216	100.00
Valid votes		180,216	93.93
Invalid/blank votes		11,637	6.07
Total votes		191,853	100.00
Independent gain from Lakas–Kampi–CMD			
Source: Commission on Elections

=== 3rd District ===
Isidro Ungab is the incumbent and is also nominated by local party Hugpong sa Tawong Lungsod. He will face former representative Ruy Elias Lopez of the Nationalist People's Coalition (formerly Lakas-Kampi-CMD) in the election.

The result of the election is under protest in the House of Representatives Electoral Tribunal.

Candidate	Party	Votes	%
Isidro Ungab (incumbent)	Liberal Party	65,029	43.64
Ruy Elias Lopez	Nationalist People's Coalition	43,828	29.41
Wilberto Al-ag	PDP–Laban	21,890	14.69
Gregorio Cañada	Nacionalista Party	10,003	6.71
Victorio Advincula	Independent	7,467	5.01
Gerardo Braganza	Independent	803	0.54
Total		149,020	100.00
Valid votes		149,020	91.30
Invalid/blank votes		14,209	8.70
Total votes		163,229	100.00
Liberal Party hold			
Source: Commission on Elections

== Davao del Norte ==
=== 1st District ===
Incumbent Arrel Olaño is ineligible for re-election since he is on his third consecutive term already and he is running for Mayor of Tagum. Lakas-Kampi-CMD did not name a nominee in this district.

The result of the election is under protest in the House of Representatives Electoral Tribunal.

Candidate	Party	Votes	%
Antonio Rafael del Rosario	Liberal Party	121,296	74.20
Emelita Alvarez	Nacionalista Party	42,170	25.80
Total		163,466	100.00
Valid votes		163,466	94.40
Invalid/blank votes		9,689	5.60
Total votes		173,155	100.00
Liberal Party gain from Lakas–Kampi–CMD			
Source: Commission on Elections

=== 2nd District ===
Incumbent Antonio Lagdameo Jr. is running unopposed.

Candidate	Party	Votes	%
Antonio Lagdameo Jr. (incumbent)	Lakas–Kampi–CMD	154,870	100.00
Total		154,870	100.00
Valid votes		154,870	83.59
Invalid/blank votes		30,403	16.41
Total votes		185,273	100.00
Lakas–Kampi–CMD hold			
Source: Commission on Elections

== Davao del Sur ==
=== 1st District ===
Marc Douglas Cagas IV is the incumbent.

Candidate	Party	Votes	%
Marc Douglas Cagas IV (incumbent)	Nacionalista Party	110,171	56.82
Erwin Llanos	Nationalist People's Coalition	74,828	38.59
Wilhelmina Almendras	Lapiang Manggagawa	8,894	4.59
Total		193,893	100.00
Valid votes		193,893	91.92
Invalid/blank votes		17,053	8.08
Total votes		210,946	100.00
Nacionalista Party hold			
Source: Commission on Elections

=== 2nd District ===
Franklin Bautista is the incumbent.

Candidate	Party	Votes	%
Franklin Bautista (incumbent)	Lakas–Kampi–CMD	85,020	65.76
Alberto Baliota I	Nacionalista Party	42,095	32.56
Jimmy Renovilla	Pwersa ng Masang Pilipino	2,180	1.69
Total		129,295	100.00
Valid votes		129,295	84.52
Invalid/blank votes		23,686	15.48
Total votes		152,981	100.00
Lakas–Kampi–CMD hold			
Source: Commission on Elections

== Davao Oriental ==
=== 1st District ===
Incumbent Nelson Dayanghirang Sr. is running unopposed.

Candidate	Party	Votes	%
Nelson Dayanghirang Sr. (incumbent)	Nacionalista Party	67,211	100.00
Total		67,211	100.00
Valid votes		67,211	79.18
Invalid/blank votes		17,678	20.82
Total votes		84,889	100.00
Nacionalista Party hold			
Source: Commission on Elections

=== 2nd District ===
Thelma Almario is the incumbent.

Candidate	Party	Votes	%
Thelma Almario (incumbent)	Lakas–Kampi–CMD	93,668	83.16
Erlinda Irigo	Nacionalista Party	14,455	12.83
Juan Camisong Jr.	Independent	4,512	4.01
Total		112,635	100.00
Valid votes		112,635	89.73
Invalid/blank votes		12,897	10.27
Total votes		125,532	100.00
Lakas–Kampi–CMD hold			
Source: Commission on Elections
