= Bayani (political party) =

Bayani Partylist
- Founded: 1997
- Headquarters: Ortigas
- Ideology: National advancement
- Political position: Center
- Colors: Red, blue and yellow

Bayani (transl. Heroism) is a political party in The Philippines. It formulates policies on education, social justice, labor advancement, poverty alleviation, graph irradiation, and the advancement of marginalized professionals. Bayani Partylist is not associated with Bayani Fernando.

== History ==
It was founded in 1997 as a multi-sectoral alliance. During Typhoon Ondoy, the party distributed relief goods to the victims in cities in the Philippines and assisted out of school youth to seek employment.

== Electoral performance ==
Election	Votes	%	Seats
2010	74,993	0.25%	0 / 57
2013	165,906	0.60%	0 / 59

== Sources ==
1. We have brgy. chiefs’ support, says Manila-based party-list | Sun.Star
