= 2010 Philippine House of Representatives elections in Caraga =

Philippine House of Representatives elections in Caraga, 2010
- May 10, 2010

9 seats of Caraga in the House of Representatives
	First party	Second party	Third party
Party	Lakas–Kampi	Nacionalista	Liberal
Seats won	8	1	0
Popular vote	588,199	160,656	160,058
Percentage	58.51%	15.98%	15.92%
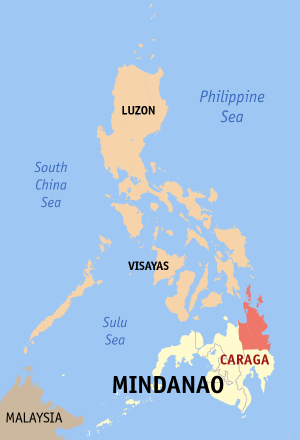
- Location of Caraga within the country.

Elections were held in the Caraga for seats in the House of Representatives of the Philippines on May 10, 2010.

The candidate with the most votes won that district's seat for the 15th Congress of the Philippines.

== Summary ==
Party	Popular vote	%	Seats won
Lakas–Kampi	588,199	58.51%	8
Nacionalista	160,656	15.98%	1
Liberal	160,058	15.91%	0
PDP–Laban	7,630	0.76%	0
Independent	88,731	8.83%	0
Valid votes	1,005,274	92.49%	9
Invalid votes	81,587	7.51%	
Turnout	1,086,861	78.55%	
Registered voters	1,383,595	100.00%	

== Agusan del Norte ==
=== 1st District ===
Jose Aquino II is the incumbent.

Candidate	Party	Votes	%
Jose Aquino II (incumbent)	Lakas–Kampi–CMD	88,656	68.50
Angelo Jimenez	Liberal Party	40,771	31.50
Total		129,427	100.00
Valid votes		129,427	92.31
Invalid/blank votes		10,779	7.69
Total votes		140,206	100.00
Lakas–Kampi–CMD hold			
Source: Commission on Elections

=== 2nd District ===
Incumbent Edelmiro Amante is retiring from politics. His daughter Angelica is his party's nominee in this district.

Candidate	Party	Votes	%
Angelica Amante	Lakas–Kampi–CMD	97,196	70.11
Jovitte Calo	Independent	40,715	29.37
Jorge Lomongsod	Independent	388	0.28
Van Amelio Fudalan	Independent	336	0.24
Total		138,635	100.00
Valid votes		138,635	93.40
Invalid/blank votes		9,792	6.60
Total votes		148,427	100.00
Lakas–Kampi–CMD hold			
Source: Commission on Elections

== Agusan del Sur ==
Agusan del Sur will have two districts starting for the 15th Congress. Rodolfo Plaza, who is serving in his third consecutive term and is ineligible for reelection, is the last representative of Agusan del Sur's at-large district.

=== 1st District ===
Rodolfo Plaza's sister, incumbent governor Maria Valentina, will run in this district.

Candidate	Party	Votes	%
Maria Valentina Plaza	Lakas–Kampi–CMD	75,986	65.25
Roberto Aquino	Liberal Party	40,464	34.75
Total		116,450	100.00
Valid votes		116,450	91.57
Invalid/blank votes		10,720	8.43
Total votes		127,170	100.00
Lakas–Kampi–CMD gain			
Source: ibanangayon.ph

=== 2nd District ===
Candidate	Party	Votes	%
Evelyn Mellana	Lakas–Kampi–CMD	61,018	55.08
Ceferino Paredes Jr.	Liberal Party	40,765	36.80
Reynaldo Quijada	PDP–Laban	7,630	6.89
Bienvenido Cebuala	Independent	1,364	1.23
Total		110,777	100.00
Valid votes		110,777	87.70
Invalid/blank votes		15,530	12.30
Total votes		126,307	100.00
Lakas–Kampi–CMD gain			
Source: ibanangayon.ph

== Dinagat Islands ==
With the Supreme Court nullifying the law that created the province still not yet final, elections proceeded to elect the province's representative. Incumbent Glenda Ecleo will not run in favor of her son Ruben Jr.

Candidate	Party	Votes	%
Ruben Ecleo Jr.	Lakas–Kampi–CMD	33,582	86.05
Francisco Rojas Sr.	Liberal Party	5,443	13.95
Total		39,025	100.00
Valid votes		39,025	80.81
Invalid/blank votes		9,267	19.19
Total votes		48,292	100.00
Lakas–Kampi–CMD hold			
Source: Commission on Elections

== Surigao del Norte ==
=== 1st District ===
Francisco Matugas is the incumbent.

The result of the election is under protest in the House of Representatives Electoral Tribunal.

Candidate	Party	Votes	%
Francisco Matugas (incumbent)	Lakas–Kampi–CMD	34,164	58.06
Constantino Navarro III	Nacionalista Party	24,349	41.38
Gertrudes Saberon	Liberal Party	325	0.55
Total		58,838	100.00
Valid votes		58,838	95.01
Invalid/blank votes		3,091	4.99
Total votes		61,929	100.00
Lakas–Kampi–CMD hold			
Source: Commission on Elections

=== 2nd District ===
Guillermo Romarate Jr. is the incumbent.

Candidate	Party	Votes	%
Guillermo Romarate Jr. (incumbent)	Lakas–Kampi–CMD	83,912	50.82
Alfonso Casurra	Nacionalista Party	81,207	49.18
Total		165,119	100.00
Valid votes		165,119	95.67
Invalid/blank votes		7,474	4.33
Total votes		172,593	100.00
Lakas–Kampi–CMD hold			
Source: Commission on Elections

== Surigao del Sur ==
=== 1st District ===
Philip Pichay is the incumbent.

Candidate	Party	Votes	%
Philip Pichay (incumbent)	Lakas–Kampi–CMD	74,585	51.46
Alvin Ty	Independent	44,030	30.38
Gregorio Murillo Jr.	Liberal Party	24,413	16.85
Anecito Murillo	Independent	1,898	1.31
Total		144,926	100.00
Valid votes		144,926	94.02
Invalid/blank votes		9,213	5.98
Total votes		154,139	100.00
Lakas–Kampi–CMD hold			
Source: Commission on Elections

=== 2nd District ===
Florencio Garay is the incumbent.

Candidate	Party	Votes	%
Florencio Garay (incumbent)	Nacionalista Party	55,100	53.98
Jesnar Falcon	Lakas–Kampi–CMD	39,100	38.30
Mario Alvizo	Liberal Party	7,877	7.72
Total		102,077	100.00
Valid votes		102,077	94.71
Invalid/blank votes		5,701	5.29
Total votes		107,778	100.00
Nacionalista Party hold			
Source: Commission on Elections
