= 2010 Philippine House of Representatives elections in the Ilocos Region =

2010 Philippine House of Representatives elections
- May 10, 2010

12 seats of the Ilocos Region in the House of Representatives
	First party	Second party	Third party
Party	Lakas–Kampi	NPC	KBL
Seats won	6	4	1
Popular vote	923,133	540,730	116,705
Percentage	43.78%	25.64	5.53%
	Fourth party	Fifth party
Party	Nacionalista	Liberal
Seats won	1	0
Popular vote	104,563	184,586
Percentage	4.96%	8.75%
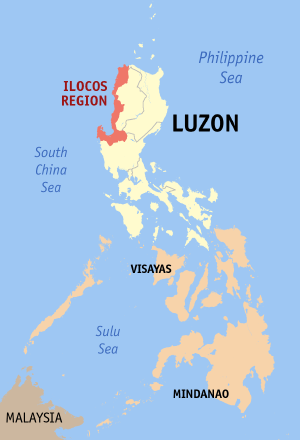
- Location of the Ilocos Region within the country.

Elections were held in the Ilocos Region for seats in the House of Representatives of the Philippines on May 10, 2010.

The candidate with the most votes won that district's seat for the 15th Congress of the Philippines.

== Summary ==
Party	Popular vote	%	Seats won
Lakas–Kampi	923,133	43.78%	6
NPC	540,730	25.64%	4
Liberal	184,586	8.75%	0
KBL	116,705	5.53%	1
Nacionalista	104,563	4.96%	1
PMP	86,972	4.12%	0
Aksyon	923	0.04%	0
Independent	150,919	7.16%	0
Valid votes	2,108,537	93.79%	12
Invalid votes	139,499	6.21%	
Turnout	2,248,036	80.04%	
Registered voters	2,808,712	100.00%	

== Ilocos Norte ==
In Ilocos Norte, the Marcoses had a split within their ranks, former first lady Imelda Marcos and her children Bongbong and Imee Marcos had allied themselves with Nacionalista Party and then-Senator Manny Villar. Imelda's nephew Michael Marcos Keon would only support Bongbong's campaign for senator as part of the Nacionalista's roster but not Villar; Marcos Keon is a member of Lakas-Kampi-CMD and supports Gilbert Teodoro. The Marcoses also had a reconciliation with the Fariñases and invited Rodolfo Fariñas as a congressional candidate for the Nacionalistas in the province's first district.

=== 1st District ===
Incumbent Roque Ablan Jr. (Lakas-Kampi-CMD) is on his third consecutive term and can not run for reelection. His seat will be contested by his son Kristian and former congressman Rodolfo Fariñas.

The result of the election is under protest in the House of Representatives Electoral Tribunal.

Candidate	Party	Votes	%
Rodolfo Fariñas	Nacionalista Party	72,184	50.42
Michel Kristian Ablan	Lakas–Kampi–CMD	40,303	28.15
Reynolan Sales	Pwersa ng Masang Pilipino	22,113	15.44
Alfonso Ruiz	Kilusang Bagong Lipunan	5,175	3.61
Renato Ma. Peralta	Liberal Party	3,399	2.37
Total		143,174	100.00
Valid votes		143,174	94.62
Invalid/blank votes		8,145	5.38
Total votes		151,319	100.00
Nacionalista Party gain from Lakas–Kampi–CMD			
Source: Commission on Elections

=== 2nd District ===
Incumbent Bongbong Marcos will leave the House to run for a Senate seat. His mother and former first lady Imelda will run for his seat under the Kilusang Bagong Lipunan (KBL) as the younger Marcos was expelled from the party. She was challenged by Marcos supporter Mariano Nalupta. She is co-nominated by the Nacionalista Party.

Nalupta placed the result of the election under protest in the House of Representatives Electoral Tribunal.

Candidate	Party	Votes	%
Imelda Marcos	Kilusang Bagong Lipunan	109,571	80.02
Mariano Nalupta Jr.	Lakas–Kampi–CMD	27,359	19.98
Total		136,930	100.00
Valid votes		136,930	94.56
Invalid/blank votes		7,873	5.44
Total votes		144,803	100.00
Kilusang Bagong Lipunan gain from Nacionalista Party			
Source: Commission on Elections

== Ilocos Sur ==
In Ilocos Sur the Singson clan headed by Luis Singson is expected to win majority of elective positions in the province. Luis will run as governor of the province, his son Ronald Singson will run as the province's representative from the first district, and daughter-in-law Grace Singson will run on her husband Eric Singson's seat in the second district since Eric is limited three consecutive terms. Eric and Grace's son Eric Jr. was Lakas-Kampi-CMD's nominee in the district.

=== 1st District ===
Ronald Singson is the incumbent.

Candidate	Party	Votes	%
Ronald Singson (incumbent)	Lakas–Kampi–CMD	91,875	72.27
Bertrand Baterina	Liberal Party	35,254	27.73
Total		127,129	100.00
Valid votes		127,129	90.94
Invalid/blank votes		12,660	9.06
Total votes		139,789	100.00
Lakas–Kampi–CMD hold			
Source: Commission on Elections

In March 2011, Singson resigned after being found guilty of drug possession in Hong Kong. The Commission on Elections called an election that will be held on May 28, 2011.

=== 2nd District ===
Eric Singson is the incumbent, but he is in his third consecutive term already and is ineligible for reelection. His son Eric Jr. is his party's nominee for the district's seat.

Candidate	Party	Votes	%
Eric Singson Jr.	Lakas–Kampi–CMD	147,409	93.63
Edwin Antolin	Pwersa ng Masang Pilipino	7,473	4.75
Wilfredo Cabinte	Liberal Party	2,548	1.62
Total		157,430	100.00
Valid votes		157,430	84.17
Invalid/blank votes		29,612	15.83
Total votes		187,042	100.00
Lakas–Kampi–CMD hold			
Source: Commission on Elections

== La Union ==
La Union's two seats in the House will be contested in albeit different circumstances: in the first district, Rep. Victor Francisco Ortega, whose brother is the current Governor Manuel Ortega will contest the seat against an independent candidate James Paul Orros, who claims to be a relative of the Ortegas. In the second district, Butch Dumpit, son of defeated gubernatorial candidate Tomas Dumpit in 2007, will go up against Eufranio Eriguel, who reportedly has support by nine of the eleven mayors in that district. The younger Ortega and Dumpit will contest the province's governorship anew.

=== 1st District ===
Victor Francisco Ortega is the incumbent. Orros eventually backed out.

Candidate	Party	Votes	%
Victor Francisco Ortega (incumbent)	Lakas–Kampi–CMD	144,537	100.00
Total		144,537	100.00
Valid votes		144,537	87.71
Invalid/blank votes		20,248	12.29
Total votes		164,785	100.00
Lakas–Kampi–CMD hold			
Source: Commission on Elections

=== 2nd District ===
Thomas Dumpit Jr. is the incumbent.

The result of the election is under protest in the House of Representatives Electoral Tribunal.

Candidate	Party	Votes	%
Eufranio Eriguel	Nationalist People's Coalition	121,236	64.61
Thomas Dumpit Jr. (incumbent)	Lakas–Kampi–CMD	63,622	33.91
Jaime Dulay	Independent	2,785	1.48
Total		187,643	100.00
Valid votes		187,643	97.00
Invalid/blank votes		5,798	3.00
Total votes		193,441	100.00
Nationalist People's Coalition gain from Lakas–Kampi–CMD			
Source: Commission on Elections

== Pangasinan ==
For the first time in history, all six of Pangasinan's legislative districts will have women candidates.

=== 1st District ===
Incumbent Arthur Celeste (Lakas-Kampi-CMD) is running for mayor of Alaminos. His brother Jesus is his party's nominee for the district's seat. He will face former GMA Network investigative journalist and reporter Maki Pulido running under the Pwersa ng Masang Pilipino; she is also nominated by local party Biskeg na Pangasinan.

Candidate	Party	Votes	%
Jesus Celeste	Lakas–Kampi–CMD	82,577	48.36
Maki Pulido	Pwersa ng Masang Pilipino	56,899	33.32
Danilo Dizon	Liberal Party	21,875	12.81
Domingo Doctor Jr.	Nacionalista Party	8,042	4.71
Christine Jimenez	Aksyon Demokratiko	929	0.54
Vladimir Mabalot III	Independent	431	0.25
Total		170,753	100.00
Valid votes		170,753	92.49
Invalid/blank votes		13,869	7.51
Total votes		184,622	100.00
Lakas–Kampi–CMD hold			
Source: Commission on Elections

=== 2nd District ===
Incumbent Victor Agbayani is running for governor of Pangasinan. The Liberal Party nominated Arthur Caronoñgan as their candidate for the district's seat.

Former PNP Chief Leopoldo Bataoil and former NBN-4 Business Correspondent Kim Bernardo Lokin are also nominated by local party Biskeg na Pangasinan.

The result of the election is under protest in the House of Representatives Electoral Tribunal.

Candidate	Party	Votes	%
Leopoldo Bataoil	Lakas–Kampi–CMD	74,705	39.32
Maria Blanca Kim Lokin	Nationalist People's Coalition	36,087	18.99
Arthel Caronoñgan	Liberal Party	32,602	17.16
Nestor Reyes	Nacionalista Party	24,337	12.81
Arsenio Merrera	Independent	19,335	10.18
Franco de Guzman	Kilusang Bagong Lipunan	1,959	1.03
Ron Vergara	Independent	963	0.51
Total		189,988	100.00
Valid votes		189,988	89.37
Invalid/blank votes		22,594	10.63
Total votes		212,582	100.00
Lakas–Kampi–CMD gain from Liberal Party			
Source: Commission on Elections

=== 3rd District ===
Maria Rachel Arenas is the incumbent.

Candidate	Party	Votes	%
Maria Rachel Arenas (incumbent)	Lakas–Kampi–CMD	165,677	65.08
Gallant Soriano	Liberal Party	88,908	34.92
Total		254,585	100.00
Valid votes		254,585	96.27
Invalid/blank votes		9,876	3.73
Total votes		264,461	100.00
Lakas–Kampi–CMD hold			
Source: Commission on Elections

=== 4th District ===
Former House Speaker Jose de Venecia has served for three consecutive terms, and is thus ineligible for re-election; his wife Gina de Venecia will run for his seat in the fourth district.

Candidate	Party	Votes	%
Gina de Venecia	Nationalist People's Coalition	128,198	66.35
Celia Lim	Independent	64,017	33.13
Alejandro Decano	Independent	1,007	0.52
Total		193,222	100.00
Valid votes		193,222	96.55
Invalid/blank votes		6,912	3.45
Total votes		200,134	100.00
Nationalist People's Coalition gain from Independent			
Source: Commission on Elections

=== 5th District ===
Mark Cojuangco is in his third consecutive term and is ineligible for reelection. His wife Sison mayor Kimi is his party's nominee for the district's seat.

Candidate	Party	Votes	%
Kimi Cojuangco	Nationalist People's Coalition	140,686	69.28
Demetrio Demetria	Independent	58,938	29.02
Martin Fao-ilan	Independent	3,443	1.70
Total		203,067	100.00
Valid votes		203,067	93.10
Invalid/blank votes		15,041	6.90
Total votes		218,108	100.00
Nationalist People's Coalition hold			
Source: Commission on Elections

=== 6th District ===
Conrado Estrella III is in his third consecutive term and is ineligible for reelection. The NPC nominated Marilyn Primcias-Agabas as their candidate for the district's seat.

Hermogenes Esperon is also nominated by local party Biskeg na Pangasinan.

Candidate	Party	Votes	%
Marilyn Primcias-Agabas	Nationalist People's Coalition	114,523	57.24
Hermogenes Esperon	Lakas–Kampi–CMD	85,069	42.52
Eduardo Libatique	Pwersa ng Masang Pilipino	487	0.24
Total		200,079	100.00
Valid votes		200,079	97.78
Invalid/blank votes		4,544	2.22
Total votes		204,623	100.00
Nationalist People's Coalition hold			
Source: Commission on Elections
