= Candido Pancrudo Jr. =

Filipino politician

Candido P. Pancrudo Jr. (born December 20, 1955) is a Filipino politician. A member of the Lakas-CMD, he was a Member of the House of Representatives of the Philippines, representing the First District of Bukidnon from 2007 to 2010.

Pancrudo won his seat by defeating the sister of his predecessor, Nereus Acosta, and former COMELEC Commissioner Virgilio Garcillano. He faced an election protest filed by Malou Acosta which is now with the Supreme Court. Per the decision of the Huouse of Representatives Electoral Tribunal his initial lead of 121 votes is now reduced to less than 15 votes.

In April 2023, Pancrudo was found guilty by the Sandiganbayan of multiple counts of graft, malversation of public funds, and malversation of public funds via falsification of public documents in connection with his involvement in the pork barrel scam. He was accused of disbursing P36.9 million from his Priority Development Assistance Fund to non-governmental organizations for non-existent livelihood seminars, without the conduct of a public bidding. He filed a motion for reconsideration but it was denied by the court in July 2023.

== Notes ==
Preceded by Nereus Acosta	Representative, 1st District of Bukidnon; 2007–2010	Succeeded by Jesus Emmanuel Paras
