= Sarangani Reconciliation and Reformation Organization =

Political party in the Philippines

- President: Priscilla Chiongbian
- Secretary-General: Miguel Escobar
- Headquarters: Alabel, Sarangani
- Ideology: Populism
- Political position: Center
- National affiliation: Lakas-CMD
- Colors: Blue

The Sarangani Reconciliation and Reformation Organization (SARRO) is a Sarangani regional political party in the Philippines, closely affiliated with the old Lakas-Christian and Muslim Democrats.

There are no results available of the last elections for the House of Representatives, but according to the website of the House, the party holds one out of 235 seats (state of the parties, June 2005).

== Controversy ==
After the bomb attack directed at Sarangani governor Migs Dominguez in 2010, the political party claimed that their opposition, the People's Champ Movement, directed the bomb attack. The opposition later denied the allegation, stating “If they (Sarro) are implying that our group has anything to do with the explosion, I say they are hallucinating and making things up to save their crumbling campaign".

After the 2010 elections, Arturo Lawa, one of two mayoral candidates stated that the opposition canvassed their election results, leading to his victory proclaimed by the Supreme Court of the Philippines.
