= Jose Zubiri III =

Filipino politician

José María F. Zubiri III
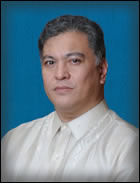
- Official portrait, 2013

Member of the Philippine House of Representatives from Bukidnon's 3rd congressional district
- In office June 30, 2007 – June 30, 2016
- Preceded by: Migz Zubiri
- Succeeded by: Manuel Zubiri

Personal details
- Born: José Maria Fernandez Zubiri III; April 30, 1963 (age 63)
- Party: Liberal (2012–present); Bukidnon Paglaum (local party; 2012–Present)
- Other political affiliations: Lakas (2007–2012)
- Relations: Migz Zubiri (brother)
- Parent(s): Jose Maria Zubiri Jr. (father); Maria Victoria Fernandez (mother)
- Profession: Politician
- Nickname: "Joey Zubiri"

José María "Joey" Fernández Zubiri III (born April 30, 1963), commonly known as Jose Ma. Zubiri III or simply Jose Zubiri III, is a Filipino politician. He served as a member of the House of Representatives of the Philippines, representing the Third District of Bukidnon from 2007 to 2016.

== Biography ==
Joey Zubiri was born in the city of Manila, Philippines and raised in the province of Bukidnon to a Negrense father Jose Ma. Rubin Zubiri Jr., Bukidnon's Provincial Governor who hails from Kabankalan, Negros Occidental, and a Bicolana mother Ma. Victoria Fernandez who was raised in Bukidnon. He speaks Cebuano, Tagalog, English, Spanish and his father's native Hiligaynon. His family is of Basque Spanish heritage.

He was preceded in his seat by his brother, Senator and former Senate President Migz Zubiri, and his father, Jose Zubiri Jr.

== Ancestors ==
Ancestors of Jose Zubiri III

4. Jose Zubiri, Sr.
2. Jose Maria Zubiri, Jr.
5. Rosa Rubin
1. Jose Zubiri III
24. Manuel Fernández
12. Bartolomé Fernández
25. Mamerta Seda
6. Manuel Fernandez
26. Ignacio Calleja
13. Pilar Calleja
27. Aquilina Maronilla
3. Maria Victoria Fernandez
28. ? Ocampo; (first name unidentified)
14. Jesús Ocampo
29. ?; (first and last name unidentified)
7. Rosita Ocampo
15. Rosenda Villaroman

House of Representatives of the Philippines
| Preceded by Migz Zubiri | Member of the House of Representatives from Bukidnon's 3rd district 2007–2016 | Succeeded by Manuel Zubiri |
