= 2013 Philippine House of Representatives elections =

23rd Philippine House of Representatives elections

- May 13, 2013
- All 293 seats to the House of Representatives of the Philippines; 147 seats needed for a majority
- Congressional district elections
- All 234 seats from congressional districts
Party	Vote %	Seats	+/–
Liberal	37.56	109	+62
NPC	17.08	42	+13
UNA	11.17	8	+8
NUP	8.55	24	+24
Nacionalista	8.41	18	−7
Lakas	5.24	14	−92
KBL	0.34	1	0
LDP	0.32	2	0
CDP	0.24	1	+1
Akbayan	0.12	1	+1
Others	8.16	14	+5
This lists parties that won seats. See the complete results below.
- Party-list election
- All 59 seats under the party-list system
Party	Vote %	Seats	+/–
Buhay	4.59	3	+1
A TEACHER	3.77	2	0
Bayan Muna	3.45	2	0
1-CARE	3.38	2	0
Akbayan	2.99	2	0
Abono	2.77	2	0
Ako Bicol	2.76	2	−1
OFW Family Club	2.72	2	+2
Gabriela	2.58	2	0
Senior Citizens	2.45	2	0
Coop-NATCCO	2.32	2	0
AGAP	2.14	2	+1
Others	32.85	28	+9
This lists parties that won seats. See the complete results below.
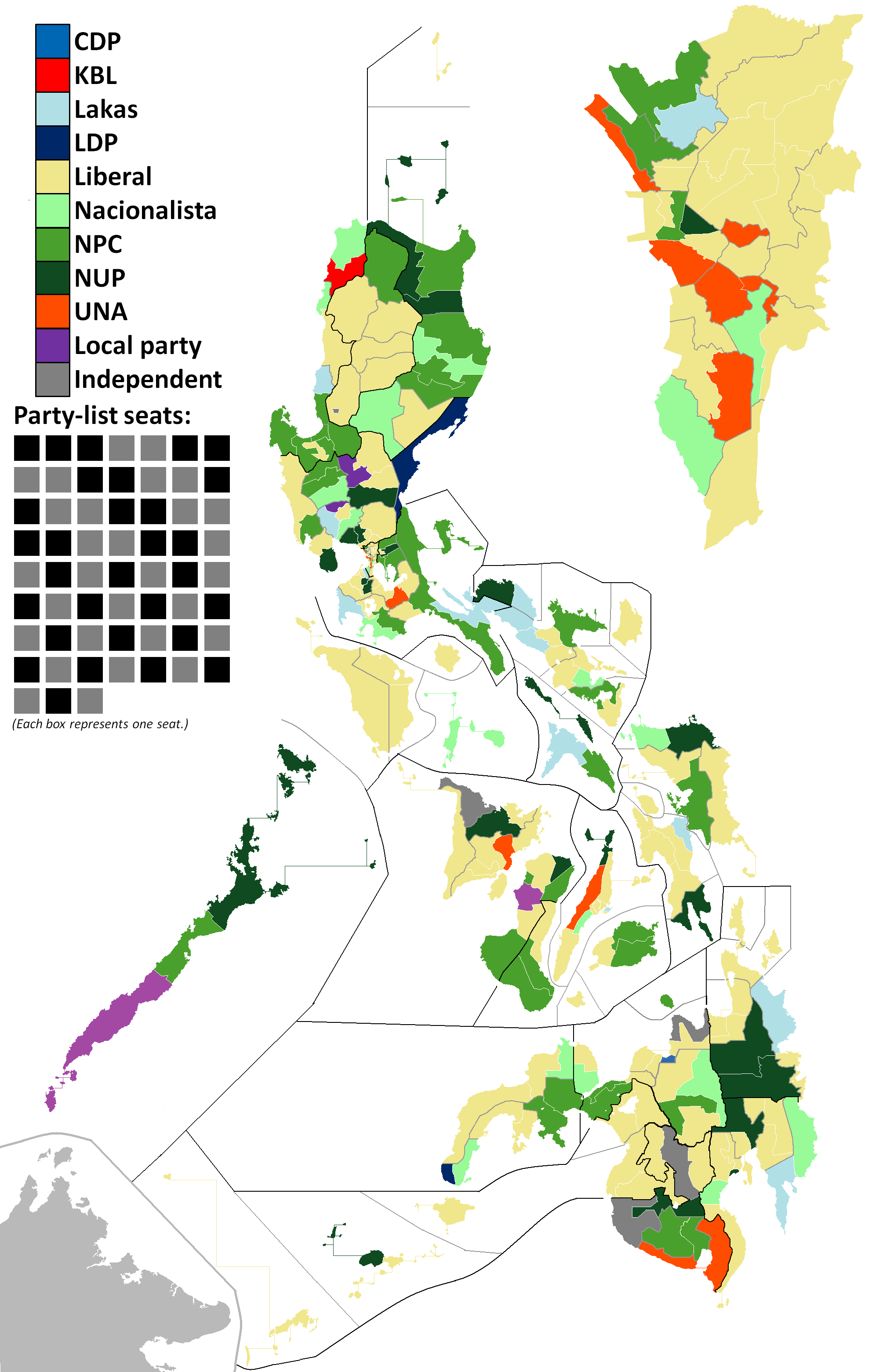
District election results; results for Metro Manila is magnified at the top right.
Speaker before	Speaker after
Feliciano Belmonte Jr. Liberal	Feliciano Belmonte Jr. Liberal

The 2013 Philippine House of Representatives elections were the 33rd lower house elections in the Philippines, and 23rd as House of Representatives. They were held on May 13, 2013, to elect members to the House of Representatives of the Philippines that would serve in the 16th Congress of the Philippines from June 30, 2013, to June 30, 2016.

The Philippines uses parallel voting for the House of Representatives: first past the post on 234 single member districts, and via closed party lists on a 2% election threshold computed via a modified Hare quota (3-seat cap and no remainders) on 58 seats, with parties with less than 1% of the first preference vote winning one seat each if 20% of the party-list seats are not filled up. Major parties are not allowed to participate in the party-list election.

While the concurrent Senate election features the two major coalitions in Team PNoy and the United Nationalist Alliance (UNA), the constituent parties of the coalitions contested the lower house election separately, and in some districts, candidates from the same coalition in the Senate are contesting a single seat. Campaigns for the House of Representatives are done on a district-by-district basis; there is no national campaign conducted by the parties. No matter the election result, the party of the president usually controls the House of Representatives, via a grand coalition of almost all parties. Only the ruling Liberal Party can win a majority, as it is the only party to put up candidates in a majority of seats.

After the release of preliminary results, the Liberal Party emerged as the largest party in the chamber. Its coalition partners also held most of their seats. Incumbent Speaker Feliciano Belmonte, Jr., was easily reelected as the Speaker of the 16th Congress.

== Electoral system ==
The election for seats in the House of Representatives is done via parallel voting. A voter has two votes: one for their local district and another via the party-list system. A candidate is not allowed to stand for both ballots, and parties participating in the district elections would have to ask for permission from the Commission on Elections, with major parties not allowed to participate in the party-list election.

=== Election via the districts ===
Each district sends one representative to the House of Representatives, with the winner with the highest number of votes winning that district's seat. The representatives from the districts comprise at most 80% of the seats.

=== Election via the party-list system ===
In the party-list system, the parties contesting the election represent a sector, or several sectors, or an ethnic group. In determining the winners, the entire country is treated as one "district". Each party that surpasses the 2% election threshold automatically wins one seat; they can win an additional number of seats in proportion to the number of votes they received, but they can't have more than three seats. The representatives elected via the party-list system, also known as "sectoral representatives", should comprise at least 20% of the seats. However, since the winners from the parties that surpass the 2% threshold had not reached the 20% quota ever since the party-list system was instituted, the parties that received less than 1% of the first preference vote are given one seat each until the 20% quota has been filled up.

=== Campaigning ===
The parties contesting the district elections campaign at the district level; there is no national-level campaigning. While no party has been able to win a majority of seats in the House of Representatives since the 1987 elections, the party of the incumbent president had usually controlled the chamber in the phenomenon known locally as the "Padrino System" or patronage politics, with other parties aligning themselves with the president's policies in exchange for pork barrel and future political favors.

While the parties contesting the Senate election grouped themselves into two major electoral alliances (Team PNoy and the United Nationalist Alliance), the constituent parties of those alliances separately contested the elections to the House of Representatives. However, as stated above, the parties will again coalesce once the 16th Congress of the Philippines convenes.

== Redistricting ==
Reapportioning (redistricting) the number of seats is either via national reapportionment, three years after the release of every census, or via piecemeal redistricting for every province or city. National reapportionment has not happened since the 1987 constitution took effect, and aside from piecemeal redistricting, the apportionment was based on the ordinance from the constitution, which was in turn based on the 1980 census.

Five new districts were created by Congress, with Bukidnon, Cotabato, Palawan and Quezon City receiving additional representatives in the upcoming Congress.

=== Changes from the outgoing Congress ===
- Division of Quezon City's 2nd district into three districts
  - The barangays surrounding the Batasang Pambansa retain the 2nd district designation.
  - The Novaliches area is becoming the 5th district.
  - The Balintawak and Tandang Sora areas are becoming the 6th district.
  - Enacted into law as Republic Act No. 10170.
- Reapportionment of Cotabato from two districts to three
  - Cotabato's western municipalities are retained as the 1st district.
  - The eastern municipalities and Kidapawan are retained as the 2nd district.
  - The central municipalities become the 3rd district.
  - Enacted into law as Republic Act No. 10177.
- Reapportionment of Bukidnon from three districts to four
  - Kalilangan and Pangantucan from the 1st district, and Valencia from the 2nd district became the 4th district.
  - The rest of the two other districts are left intact.
  - Enacted into law as Republic Act No. 10184.
- Division of Palawan's 2nd district into two districts
  - Aborlan and Puerto Princesa become the 3rd district.
  - The rest of the 2nd district is left intact.
  - Enacted into law as Republic Act No. 10171.

=== Summary of changes ===
As there were 234 districts, and there should be one party-list seat for every 4 districts, this means there are 59 party-list seats, and 293 total seats.

Category	Total
Congressional districts in the outgoing Congress	229
New districts from redistricting laws from previous Congress	0
New districts from redistricting laws from outgoing Congress	5
Congressional districts in the next Congress	234
Party-list seats for the next Congress	59
Total seats for the next Congress	293

== Marginal seats ==
These are seats where the winning margin was 3% or less, politicians may choose to run under a different political party as compared to 2010. This excludes districts where the nearest losing candidate or that candidate's party is not contesting the election, or districts that were redistricted.

District	2010 Winner	Political party on 2010 election day	Current political party	2013 opponent	Political party	2010 margin	2013 result
Biliran	Rogelio Espina	Nacionalista	Liberal	Glenn Chong	PMP	0.45%	Liberal hold
Camarines Sur–5th	Salvio Fortuno	Nacionalista	Liberal	Emmanuel Alfelor	NPC	0.62%	Liberal hold
Batanes	Dina Abad	Liberal	Liberal	Carlo Oliver Diasnes	Independent	1.06%	Liberal hold
Mountain Province	Maximo Dalog	Lakas–Kampi	Liberal	Jupiter Dominguez	UNA	1.54%	Liberal hold
Surigao del Norte–2nd	Guillermo Romarate, Jr.	Lakas–Kampi	Liberal	Robert Ace Barbers	Nacionalista	1.64%	Liberal hold
Manila–6th	Sandy Ocampo	Liberal	Liberal	Benny M. Abante	UNA	1.81%	Liberal hold
Zamboanga Sibugay–2nd	Romeo Jalosjos, Jr.	Nacionalista	Nacionalista	Dulce Ann Hofer	Liberal	1.85%	Liberal gain from Nacionalista
Isabela–2nd	Ana Cristina Go	Nacionalista	Nacionalista	Edgar Uy	Liberal	1.93%	Nacionalista hold
Cagayan de Oro–1st	Jose Benjamin Benaldo	PMP	Nacionalista	Rolando Uy	Liberal	2.03%	Liberal gain from Nacionalista
Bataan–1st	Herminia Roman	Lakas–Kampi	Liberal	Enrique T. Garcia	NUP	2.53%	Liberal hold
Northern Samar–2nd	Emil Ong	Lakas–Kampi	NUP	Ramp Nielsen Uy	Liberal	2.67%	NUP hold
Batangas–3rd	Nelson Collantes	PMP	Liberal	Victoria Hernandez-Reyes	Nacionalista	2.78%	Liberal hold
Cotabato–2nd	Nancy Catamco	Lakas–Kampi	Liberal	Bernardo Piñol, Jr.	Independent	2.88%	Redistricted; Liberal hold
Zamboanga del Norte–2nd	Rosendo Labadlabad	Liberal	Liberal	Rolando Yebes	NUP	2.93%	Liberal hold

== Retiring and term-limited incumbents ==
These are the incumbents who are not running for a seat in the House of Representatives, and are not term limited:

- Lakas–CMD
  - Lapu-Lapu City: Arturo Radaza
  - Lanao del Norte–2nd: Fatima Aliah Dimaporo
  - Masbate–1st: Antonio Kho
    - Ran and lost in the Masbate gubernatorial election.
  - Pampanga–1st: Carmelo Lazatin
    - Ran and lost in the Angeles mayoral election.
  - Zamboanga del Norte–3rd: Cesar Jalosjos
    - Ran and lost in the Zamboanga del Norte gubernatorial election.
- Liberal Party
  - Aklan-Lone: Florencio Miraflores
    - Ran and Won in the Aklan gubernatorial election.
  - Cavite–3rd: Erineo Maliksi
    - Ran and lost in the Cavite gubernatorial election.
  - Cebu City–1st: Rachel del Mar
  - Cebu City–2nd: Tomas Osmeña
    - Ran and lost in the Cebu City mayoral election.
  - Negros Oriental–1st: Jocelyn Limkaichong
    - Ran and lost in the Negros Oriental gubernatorial election.
  - Pangasinan–3rd: Rachel Arenas
  - Parañaque–1st: Edwin Olivarez
    - Ran and won in the Parañaque mayoral election.
  - Quezon–2nd: Irvin Alcala
    - Ran and lost in the Quezon gubernatorial election.
  - Taguig–2nd: Sigfrido Tinga
  - Zamboanga City–1st: Maria Isabelle Climaco Salazar
    - Ran and won in the Zamboanga City mayoral election.
- Nacionalista Party
  - Davao del Sur–1st: Marc Douglas Cagas IV
    - Ran and lost in the Davao del Sur gubernatorial election.
  - Ilocos Sur–1st: Ryan Singson
    - Ran and won in the Ilocos Sur gubernatorial election.
  - Misamis Oriental–2nd: Yevgeny Vincente Emano
    - Ran and won in the Misamis Oriental gubernatorial election.
  - Zamboanga Sibugay–1st: Jonathan Yambao
- National Unity Party
  - Camarines Norte–1st: Renato Unico, Jr.
    - Ran and lost in the Camarines Norte gubernatorial election.
  - Cavite–6th: Antonio Ferrer
    - Ran and won in the General Trias mayoral election.
  - Cebu–3rd: Pablo John Garcia
    - Ran and lost in the Cebu gubernatorial election.
- Nationalist People's Coalition
  - Cagayan–1st: Juan Ponce Enrile, Jr.
    - Ran and lost in the Senate election.
  - Cebu–6th: Ramon Durano VI
    - Ran and won in the Danao vice mayoral election.
  - Isabela–1st: Rodolfo Albano, Jr.
  - Nueva Ecija–1st: Josefina Joson
    - Ran and lost in the Nueva Ecija gubernatorial election.
  - South Cotabato–2nd: Daisy Avance-Fuentes
  - Valenzuela–1st: Rexlon Gatchalian
    - Ran and won in the Valenzuela mayoral election.
- United Nationalist Alliance
  - San Juan: JV Ejercito
    - Ran and won in the Senate election.

== Defeated incumbents ==
District	Party	Incumbent	Winner	Party	Notes
Bacolod	Independent	Anthony Golez, Jr.	Evelio Leonardia	NPC	Golez is an NPC member running as an independent.
Baguio	UNA	Bernardo Vergara	Nicasio Aliping	Independent	
Batangas–1st	Liberal	Tomas Apacible	Eileen Ermita-Buhain	Nacionalista	Apacible defeated Ermita-Buhain's father Eduardo in the 2010 general election.
Bukidnon–1st	NPC	Jesus Emmanuel Paras	Maria Lourdes Acosta	Liberal	Paras defeated Acosta's mother Socorro in the 2010 general election.
Cagayan de Oro–1st	Nacionalista	Jose Benjamin Benaldo	Rolando Uy	Liberal	Benaldo beat Uy's son Rainier in the 2010 general election.
Caloocan–2nd	Nacionalista	Mitzi Cajayon	Edgar Erice	Liberal	
Cebu–2nd	NUP	Pablo P. Garcia	Wilfredo Caminero	Liberal	Garcia is one of the deputy speakers.
Iloilo–2nd	UNA	Augusto Syjuco, Jr.	Arcadio Gorriceta	Liberal	
Laguna–3rd	Liberal	Maria Evita Agaro	Sol Aragones	UNA	
Lanao del Sur–1st	Independent	Hussein Pangandaman	Ansaruddin Adiong	Liberal	
Marinduque	NUP	Lord Allan Jay Velasco	Regina Ongsiako Reyes	Liberal	Velasco beat Reyes' brother Edmundo in the 2010 general election.
Misamis Occidental–2nd	Liberal	Loreto Leo Ocampos	Henry Oaminal	Nacionalista	
Northern Samar–1st	Liberal	Raul Daza	Harlin Abayon	Nacionalista	Daza is one of the deputy speakers. It was the closest House race with a margin of victory of 52 votes.
Pampanga–3rd	NPC	Aurelio Gonzales, Jr.	Oscar Rodriguez	Liberal	
Sulu–2nd	NPC	Nur Ana Sahidulla	Maryam Arbison	Liberal	
Tarlac–3rd	NUP	Jeci Lapus	Noel Villanueva	Nacionalista	
Zambales–2nd	SZP	Jun Omar Ebdane	Cheryl Delloso-Montalla	Liberal	Ebdane beat Delloso-Montalla in the 2012 special election.
Zamboanga Sibugay–2nd	Nacionalista	Romeo Jalosjos, Jr.	Dulce Ann Hofer	Liberal	Jalosjos defeated Hofer's brother George in the 2010 general election.

== Open seat gains ==
- Liberal Party
  - Albay–1st
  - Agusan del Norte–1st
  - Caloocan–1st
  - Camarines Sur–3rd
  - Cavite–1st (vacant seat originally held by the Liberals)
  - Cavite-7th
  - Dinagat Islands (vacant seat originally held by Lakas)*
  - Maguindanao–2nd
  - Occidental Mindoro
  - Quezon City–5th (new seat notionally held by the Liberals)
  - Quezon City–6th (new seat notionally held by the Liberals)
  - Siquijor
  - Tawi-Tawi
  - Zamboanga del Norte–3rd
  - Zamboanga Sibugay–1st
- Laban ng Demokratikong Pilipino
  - Zamboanga City–1st
- Nacionalista Party
  - Batangas–2nd
  - Taguig–2nd
- Nationalist People's Coalition
  - Bohol–2nd (vacant seat originally held by the NPC)
  - Bukidnon–4th (new seat notionally held by the NPC)
  - Camiguin (vacant seat originally held by the NPC)
  - Palawan–3rd (new seat notionally held by the NUP)
  - Sorsogon–1st (vacant seat originally held by the Liberals)
  - Zambales–1st
- United Nationalist Alliance
  - Cebu–3rd
  - Parañaque–2nd
- Local parties
  - Nueva Ecija–1st (Unang Sigaw)
  - Palawan–2nd (PPP)
    - PPP's candidate is a member of the NUP, the party it gained the seat from.
  - Pampanga–1st (Kambilan)
    - Kambilan's candidate is connected to Lakas–CMD, the party it gained the seat from.
  - San Juan (Magdiwang)
    - Magdiwang is the local affiliate of UNA, the party it gained the seat from.
- Independents
  - Aklan
  - Cotabato–3rd (new seat notionally held by the Liberals)
  - Misamis Oriental–2nd
  - Zamboanga City–2nd

*Kaka Bag-ao is a party-list representative for Akbayan who ran in Dinagat Islands district under the Liberal Party and won.

== Results ==
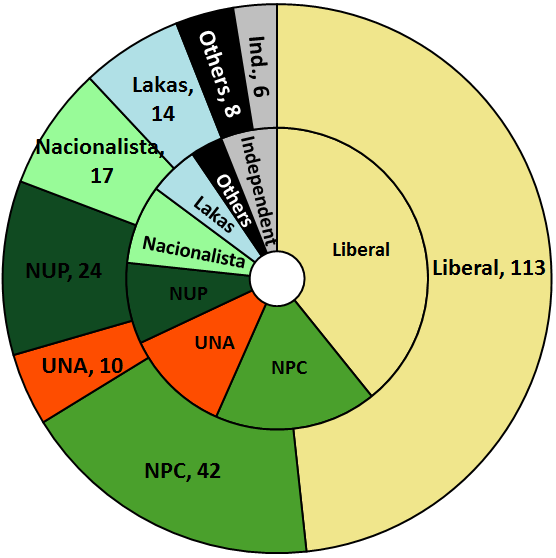
2013 Philippine House district elections chart of votes (inner ring) compared to seats won (outer ring).

=== District elections ===
Only the Liberal Party can win the election outright by placing candidates in a majority of seats. With 292 seats, including seats reserved for sectoral representatives, 147 seats are needed for a majority, and only the Liberal Party is contesting more than 150 seats.

The Liberal Party did win a near majority of the district seats. They are expected to form a coalition with other Team PNoy component parties, other parties, most independents, and most party-list representatives for a large working majority. Lakas–CMD is expected to form the minority bloc anew, while the United Nationalist Alliance and left-leaning representatives may join either bloc.

A total of six independents won, one less than in 2010.

The vote totals below were collected from the results displayed from the COMELEC's "Transparency" server. These are partial and unofficial. The seats won are the ones which had been officially proclaimed by the COMELEC.

Party	Votes	%	+/–	Seats	+/–
Liberal Party	10,557,265	37.56	+18.38	109	+62
Nationalist People's Coalition	4,800,907	17.08	+1.40	42	+13
United Nationalist Alliance	3,140,381	11.17	New	8	New
National Unity Party	2,402,097	8.55	New	24	New
Nacionalista Party	2,364,400	8.41	−2.79	18	−7
Lakas–CMD	1,472,464	5.24	−32.09	14	−92
PDP–Laban	281,320	1.00	+0.29	0	−2
Pwersa ng Masang Pilipino	144,030	0.51	+1.98	0	−4
Bukidnon Paglaum	100,405	0.36	New	1	New
Aksyon Demokratiko	97,982	0.35	−0.09	0	0
Kambilan ning Memalen Kapampangan	96,433	0.34	New	1	New
Kabalikat ng Bayan sa Kaunlaran	94,966	0.34	+0.14	1	0
Unang Sigaw	94,952	0.34	New	1	New
Kilusang Bagong Lipunan	94,484	0.34	−0.12	1	0
United Negros Alliance	91,467	0.33	New	1	New
Laban ng Demokratikong Pilipino	90,070	0.32	−0.15	2	0
Kusug Agusanon	71,436	0.25	New	1	New
Hugpong sa Tawong Lungsod	65,324	0.23	New	0	0
Centrist Democratic Party of the Philippines	68,281	0.24	New	1	New
Sulong Zambales	60,280	0.21	New	0	0
Partidong Pagbabago ng Palawan	57,485	0.20	New	1	New
Kapayapaan, Kaunlaran at Katarungan	54,425	0.19	+0.16	0	0
Akbayan	34,239	0.12	New	1	New
Partido Magdiwang	23,253	0.08	−0.01	1	0
One Cebu	21,936	0.08	New	0	0
Ang Kapatiran	19,019	0.07	−0.01	0	0
Adelante Zamboanga Party	15,881	0.06	New	0	0
Partido ng Manggagawa at Magsasaka	10,396	0.04	−2.59	0	−1
Partido Lakas ng Masa	10,196	0.04	New	0	0
Makabayan	3,870	0.01	New	0	0
Ompia Party	1,682	0.01	New	0	0
Democratic Party of the Philippines	1,071	0.00	New	0	0
Independent	1,665,324	5.92	−0.93	6	−1
Party-list seats (Note: Originally, only 58 seats were up in the party-list election. An additional seat was then seated, then two seats were ultimately not seated until the end of the congressional term.)				59	+2
Total	28,107,721	100.00	–	293	+7
Valid votes	28,107,721	70.02	−19.45		
Invalid/blank votes	12,036,486	29.98	+19.45		
Total votes	40,144,207	–	–		
Registered voters/turnout	52,014,648	77.18	+2.84		

Vote share
Liberal	37.56%
NPC	17.08%
UNA	11.17%
NUP	8.55%
Nacionalista	8.41%
Lakas	5.24%
Others	15.53%

Congressional district seats
Liberal	46.58%
NPC	17.95%
UNA	3.42%
NUP	10.26%
Nacionalista	7.69%
Lakas	5.98%
Others	8.12%

==== By district ====
Congressional district	Incumbent	Incumbent's party	Winner	Winner's party
Abra	Joy Bernos	Liberal	Joy Bernos	Liberal
Agusan del Norte–1st	Jose Aquino II	Lakas	Lawrence Fortun	Liberal
Agusan del Norte–2nd	Angelica Amante	Liberal	Erlpe John Amante	Kusug Agusanon
Agusan del Sur–1st	Maria Valentina Plaza	NUP	Maria Valentina Plaza	NUP
Agusan del Sur–2nd	Evelyn Plaza-Mellana	NUP	Evelyn Plaza-Mellana	NUP
Aklan	Florencio Miraflores	Liberal	Teodorico Haresco Jr.	Independent
Albay–1st	Edcel Lagman	Independent	Edcel Greco Lagman	Liberal
Albay–2nd	Al Francis Bichara	Nacionalista	Al Francis Bichara	Nacionalista
Albay–3rd	Fernando Gonzalez	Liberal	Fernando Gonzalez	Liberal
Antipolo–1st	Roberto Puno	NUP	Roberto Puno	NUP
Antipolo–2nd	Romeo Acop	Liberal	Romeo Acop	Liberal
Antique	Paolo Everardo Javier	Liberal	Paolo Everardo Javier	Liberal
Apayao	Eleanor Begtang	NPC	Eleanor Begtang	NPC
Aurora	Sonny Angara	LDP	Bella Angara	LDP
Bacolod	Anthony Golez	Independent	Evelio Leonardia	NPC
Baguio	Bernardo Vergara	UNA	Nicasio Aliping Jr.	Independent
Basilan	Hadjiman Hataman Salliman	Liberal	Hadjiman Hataman Salliman	Liberal
Bataan–1st	Herminia Roman	Liberal	Herminia Roman	Liberal
Bataan–2nd	Albert Garcia	NUP	Tet Garcia	NUP
Batanes	Henedina Abad	Liberal	Henedina Abad	Liberal
Batangas–1st	Tomas Apacible	Liberal	Eileen Ermita-Buhain	Lakas
Batangas–2nd	Hermilando Mandanas	Independent	Raneo Abu	Nacionalista
Batangas–3rd	Sonny Collantes	Liberal	Sonny Collantes	Liberal
Batangas–4th	Mark Llandro Mendoza	NPC	Mark Llandro Mendoza	NPC
Benguet	Ronald Cosalan	Liberal	Ronald Cosalan	Liberal
Biliran	Rogelio Espina	Liberal	Rogelio Espina	Liberal
Bohol–1st	Rene Relampagos	Liberal	Rene Relampagos	Liberal
Bohol–2nd	Vacant		Aris Aumentado	NPC
Bohol–3rd	Arthur C. Yap	NPC	Arthur C. Yap	NPC
Bukidnon–1st	Jesus Emmanuel Paras	NPC	Maria Lourdes Acosta-Alba	Liberal
Bukidnon–2nd	Florencio Flores Jr.	Nacionalista	Florencio Flores Jr.	Nacionalista
Bukidnon–3rd	Jose Zubiri III	BPP	Jose Zubiri III	BPP
Bukidnon–4th	New district		Rogelio Neil Roque	NPC
Bulacan–1st	Victoria Sy-Alvarado	NUP	Victoria Sy-Alvarado	NUP
Bulacan–2nd	Pedro Pancho	NUP	Gavini Pancho	NUP
Bulacan–3rd	Jonjon Mendoza	Liberal	Jonjon Mendoza	Liberal
Bulacan–4th	Linabelle Villarica	Liberal	Linabelle Villarica	Liberal
Cagayan–1st	Jack Enrile	NPC	Sally Ponce Enrile	NPC
Cagayan–2nd	Baby Alfonso	NUP	Baby Alfonso	NUP
Cagayan–3rd	Randolph Ting	NUP	Randolph Ting	NUP
Cagayan de Oro–1st	Jose Benjamin Benaldo	Nacionalista	Rolando Uy	Liberal
Cagayan de Oro–2nd	Rufus Rodriguez	CDP	Rufus Rodriguez	CDP
Caloocan–1st	Oscar Malapitan	UNA	Enrico Echiverri	Liberal
Caloocan–2nd	Mitch Cajayon-Uy	NUP	Edgar Erice	Liberal
Camarines Norte–1st	Renato Unico Jr.	NUP	Cathy Barcelona-Reyes	NUP
Camarines Norte–2nd	Elmer Panotes	Lakas	Elmer Panotes	Lakas
Camarines Sur–1st	Rolando Andaya Jr.	Lakas	Rolando Andaya Jr.	Lakas
Camarines Sur–2nd	Dato Arroyo	Lakas	Dato Arroyo	Lakas
Camarines Sur–3rd	Luis Villafuerte	NPC	Leni Robredo	Liberal
Camarines Sur–4th	Arnulfo Fuentebella	NPC	Felix William Fuentebella	NPC
Camarines Sur–5th	Salvio Fortuno	Liberal	Salvio Fortuno	Liberal
Camiguin	Vacant		Xavier Jesus Romualdo	NPC
Capiz–1st	Antonio del Rosario	Liberal	Antonio del Rosario	Liberal
Capiz–2nd	Jane Castro	NUP	Fredenil Castro	NUP
Catanduanes	Cesar Sarmiento	Liberal	Cesar Sarmiento	Liberal
Cavite–1st	Vacant		Francis Gerald Abaya	Liberal
Cavite–2nd	Lani Mercado	Lakas	Lani Mercado	Lakas
Cavite–3rd	Ayong Maliksi	Liberal	Alex Advincula	Liberal
Cavite–4th	Elpidio Barzaga Jr.	NUP	Elpidio Barzaga Jr.	NUP
Cavite–5th	Roy Loyola	Liberal	Roy Loyola	Liberal
Cavite–6th	Antonio Ferrer	NUP	Luis Ferrer IV	NUP
Cavite–7th	Jesus Crispin Remulla	Nacionalista	Abraham Tolentino	Liberal
Cebu–1st	Eduardo Gullas	Nacionalista	Samsam Gullas	Nacionalista
Cebu–2nd	Pablo P. Garcia	NUP	Wilfredo Caminero	Liberal
Cebu–3rd	Pablo John Garcia	NUP	Gwendolyn Garcia	UNA
Cebu–4th	Benhur Salimbangon	NUP	Benhur Salimbangon	NUP
Cebu–5th	Ramon Durano VI	BAKUD	Ace Durano	Liberal
Cebu–6th	Luigi Quisumbing	Liberal	Luigi Quisumbing	Liberal
Cebu City–1st	Rachel del Mar	Liberal	Raul del Mar	Liberal
Cebu City–2nd	Tomas Osmeña	Liberal	Rodrigo Abellanosa	Liberal
Compostela Valley–1st	Maricar Zamora	Liberal	Maricar Zamora	Liberal
Compostela Valley–2nd	Rommel Amatong	Liberal	Rommel Amatong	Liberal
Cotabato–1st	Jesus Sacdalan	Liberal	Jesus Sacdalan	Liberal
Cotabato–2nd	Nancy Catamco	Liberal	Nancy Catamco	Liberal
Cotabato–3rd	New district		Jose Tejada	Independent
Davao City–1st	Karlo Nograles	NUP	Karlo Nograles	NUP
Davao City–2nd	Mylene Garcia-Albano	Liberal	Mylene Garcia-Albano	Liberal
Davao City–3rd	Isidro Ungab	Liberal	Isidro Ungab	Liberal
Davao del Norte–1st	Antonio Rafael del Rosario	Liberal	Antonio Rafael del Rosario	Liberal
Davao del Norte–2nd	Antonio Lagdameo Jr.	NUP	Antonio Lagdameo Jr.	NUP
Davao del Sur–1st	Marc Douglas Cagas IV	Nacionalista	Mercedes Cagas	Nacionalista
Davao del Sur–2nd	Franklin Bautista	Liberal	Franklin Bautista	Liberal
Davao Oriental–1st	Nelson Dayanghirang Sr.	Nacionalista	Nelson Dayanghirang Sr.	Nacionalista
Davao Oriental–2nd	Thelma Almario	Lakas	Thelma Almario	Lakas
Dinagat Islands	Vacant		Kaka Bag-ao	Liberal
Eastern Samar	Ben Evardone	Liberal	Ben Evardone	Liberal
Guimaras	JC Rahman Nava	Liberal	JC Rahman Nava	Liberal
Ifugao	Teddy Baguilat	Liberal	Teddy Baguilat	Liberal
Iligan	Vicente Belmonte Jr.	Liberal	Vicente Belmonte Jr.	Liberal
Ilocos Norte–1st	Rodolfo Fariñas	Nacionalista	Rodolfo Fariñas	Nacionalista
Ilocos Norte–2nd	Imelda Marcos	KBL	Imelda Marcos	KBL
Ilocos Sur–1st	Ryan Luis Singson	Nacionalista	Ronald Singson	Nacionalista
Ilocos Sur–2nd	Eric Singson Jr.	Liberal	Eric Singson	Liberal
Iloilo–1st	Janette Garin	Liberal	Richard Garin	Liberal
Iloilo–2nd	Augusto Syjuco Jr.	UNA	Arcadio Gorriceta	Liberal
Iloilo–3rd	Arthur Defensor Jr.	Liberal	Arthur Defensor Jr.	Liberal
Iloilo–4th	Ferjenel Biron	UNA	Hernan Biron Jr.	UNA
Iloilo–5th	Niel Tupas Jr.	Liberal	Niel Tupas Jr.	Liberal
Iloilo City	Jerry Treñas	Liberal	Jerry Treñas	Liberal
Isabela–1st	Rodolfo Albano Jr.	NPC	Rodolfo Albano III	NPC
Isabela–2nd	Anna Cristina Go	Nacionalista	Anna Cristina Go	Nacionalista
Isabela–3rd	Napoleon Dy	NPC	Napoleon Dy	NPC
Isabela–4th	Giorgidi Aggabao	NPC	Giorgidi Aggabao	NPC
Kalinga	Manuel Agyao	Liberal	Manuel Agyao	Liberal
La Union–1st	Victor Ortega	Lakas	Victor Ortega	Lakas
La Union–2nd	Eufranio Eriguel	NPC	Eufranio Eriguel	NPC
Laguna–1st	Dan Fernandez	Liberal	Dan Fernandez	Liberal
Laguna–2nd	Timmy Chipeco	Liberal	Jun Chipeco	Liberal
Laguna–3rd	Evita Arago	Liberal	Sol Aragones	UNA
Laguna–4th	Edgar San Luis	Liberal	Benjamin Agarao Jr.	Liberal
Lanao del Norte–1st	Imelda Dimaporo	NPC	Imelda Dimaporo	NPC
Lanao del Norte–2nd	Fatimah Aliah Dimaporo	NPC	Abdullah D. Dimaporo	NPC
Lanao del Sur–1st	Hussein Pangandaman	Independent	Ansaruddin Alonto Adiong	Liberal
Lanao del Sur–2nd	Pangalian Balindong	Liberal	Pangalian Balindong	Liberal
Lapu-Lapu City	Arturo Radaza	Lakas	Aileen Radaza	Lakas
Las Piñas	Mark Villar	Nacionalista	Mark Villar	Nacionalista
Leyte–1st	Martin Romualdez	Lakas	Martin Romualdez	Lakas
Leyte–2nd	Sergio Apostol	Liberal	Sergio Apostol	Liberal
Leyte–3rd	Andres Salvacion Jr.	Liberal	Andres Salvacion Jr.	Liberal
Leyte–4th	Vacant		Lucy Torres-Gomez	Liberal
Leyte–5th	Jose Carlos Cari	Liberal	Jose Carlos Cari	Liberal
Maguindanao–1st	Bai Sandra Sema	Liberal	Bai Sandra Sema	Liberal
Maguindanao–2nd	Simeon Datumanong	Lakas	Zajid Mangudadatu	Liberal
Makati–1st	Monique Lagdameo	UNA	Monique Lagdameo	UNA
Makati–2nd	Abigail Binay	UNA	Abigail Binay	UNA
Malabon	Josephine Lacson-Noel	NPC	Josephine Lacson-Noel	NPC
Mandaluyong	Neptali Gonzales II	Liberal	Neptali Gonzales II	Liberal
Manila–1st	Benjamin Asilo	Liberal	Benjamin Asilo	Liberal
Manila–2nd	Carlo Lopez	Liberal	Carlo Lopez	Liberal
Manila–3rd	Zenaida Angping	NPC	Zenaida Angping	NPC
Manila–4th	Trisha Bonoan-David	NUP	Trisha Bonoan-David	NUP
Manila–5th	Amado Bagatsing	KABAKA	Amado Bagatsing	KABAKA
Manila–6th	Rosenda Ann Ocampo	Liberal	Rosenda Ann Ocampo	Liberal
Marikina–1st	Marcelino Teodoro	Liberal	Marcelino Teodoro	Liberal
Marikina–2nd	Miro Quimbo	Liberal	Miro Quimbo	Liberal
Marinduque	Lord Allan Velasco	NUP	Regina Reyes Mandanas	Liberal
Masbate–1st	Narciso Bravo Jr.	NUP	Maria Vida Espinosa-Bravo	NUP
Masbate–2nd	Antonio Kho	Lakas	Elisa Olga Kho	Lakas
Masbate–3rd	Scott Davies Lanete	NPC	Scott Davies Lanete	NPC
Misamis Occidental–1st	Jorge Almonte	Liberal	Jorge Almonte	Liberal
Misamis Occidental–2nd	Loreto Ocampos	Liberal	Henry Oaminal	Nacionalista
Misamis Oriental–1st	Peter Unabia	Liberal	Peter Unabia	Liberal
Misamis Oriental–2nd	Yevgeny Emano	Nacionalista	Juliette Uy	Independent
Mountain Province	Maximo Dalog	Liberal	Maximo Dalog	Liberal
Muntinlupa	Rodolfo Biazon	Liberal	Rodolfo Biazon	Liberal
Navotas	Toby Tiangco	UNA	Toby Tiangco	UNA
Negros Occidental–1st	Jules Ledesma	NPC	Jules Ledesma	NPC
Negros Occidental–2nd	Alfredo Marañon III	NUP	Leo Rafael Cueva	NUP
Negros Occidental–3rd	Albee Benitez	Liberal	Albee Benitez	Liberal
Negros Occidental–4th	Jeffrey Ferrer	UNeGA	Jeffrey Ferrer	UNeGA
Negros Occidental–5th	Alejandro Mirasol	Liberal	Alejandro Mirasol	Liberal
Negros Occidental–6th	Mercedes Alvarez	NPC	Mercedes Alvarez	NPC
Negros Oriental–1st	Jocelyn Sy-Limkaichong	Liberal	Manuel Iway	Liberal
Negros Oriental–2nd	George Arnaiz	NPC	George Arnaiz	NPC
Negros Oriental–3rd	Pryde Henry Teves	NPC	Pryde Henry Teves	NPC
Northern Samar–1st	Raul Daza	Liberal	Harlin Abayon	Nacionalista
Northern Samar–2nd	Emil Ong	NUP	Emil Ong	NUP
Nueva Ecija–1st	Josefina Joson	NPC	Estrellita Suansing	Unang Sigaw
Nueva Ecija–2nd	Joseph Gilbert Violago	Liberal	Joseph Gilbert Violago	Liberal
Nueva Ecija–3rd	Czarina Umali	Liberal	Czarina Umali	Liberal
Nueva Ecija–4th	Rodolfo Antonino	NUP	Magnolia Antonino-Nadres	NUP
Nueva Vizcaya	Carlos Padilla	Nacionalista	Carlos Padilla	Nacionalista
Occidental Mindoro	Girlie Villarosa	Lakas	Josephine Sato	Liberal
Oriental Mindoro–1st	Rodolfo Valencia	Liberal	Paulino Salvador Leachon	Liberal
Oriental Mindoro–2nd	Reynaldo Umali	Liberal	Reynaldo Umali	Liberal
Palawan–1st	Antonio Alvarez	NUP	Franz Alvarez	NUP
Palawan–2nd	Victorino Dennis Socrates	NUP	Frederick Abueg	PPPL
Palawan–3rd	New district		Douglas Hagedorn	NPC
Pampanga–1st	Carmelo Lazatin Sr.	Lakas	Yeng Guiao	Kambilan
Pampanga–2nd	Gloria Macapagal Arroyo	Lakas	Gloria Macapagal Arroyo	Lakas
Pampanga–3rd	Aurelio Gonzales Jr.	NPC	Oscar Samson Rodriguez	Liberal
Pampanga–4th	Anna York Bondoc	Nacionalista	Juan Pablo Bondoc	Nacionalista
Pangasinan–1st	Jesus Celeste	NPC	Jesus Celeste	NPC
Pangasinan–2nd	Leopoldo Bataoil	NPC	Leopoldo Bataoil	NPC
Pangasinan–3rd	Maria Rachel Arenas	Liberal	Rose Marie Arenas	Liberal
Pangasinan–4th	Gina de Venecia	NPC	Gina de Venecia	NPC
Pangasinan–5th	Carmen Cojuangco	NPC	Carmen Cojuangco	NPC
Pangasinan–6th	Marlyn Primicias-Agabas	NPC	Marlyn Primicias-Agabas	NPC
Parañaque–1st	Edwin Olivarez	Liberal	Eric Olivarez	Liberal
Parañaque–2nd	Roilo Golez	Liberal	Gustavo Tambunting	UNA
Pasay	Emi Rubiano	Liberal	Emi Rubiano	Liberal
Pasig	Roman Romulo	Liberal	Roman Romulo	Liberal
Quezon–1st	Mark Enverga	NPC	Mark Enverga	NPC
Quezon–2nd	Irvin Alcala	Liberal	Vicente Alcala	Liberal
Quezon–3rd	Danilo Suarez	Lakas	Aleta Suarez	Lakas
Quezon–4th	Erin Tañada	Liberal	Angelina Tan	NPC
Quezon City–1st	Vincent Crisologo	UNA	Francisco Calalay	Liberal
Quezon City–2nd	Winston Castelo	Liberal	Winston Castelo	Liberal
Quezon City–3rd	Jorge Banal Jr.	Liberal	Jorge Banal Jr.	Liberal
Quezon City–4th	Feliciano Belmonte Jr.	Liberal	Feliciano Belmonte Jr.	Liberal
Quezon City–5th	New district		Alfred Vargas	Liberal
Quezon City–6th	New district		Kit Belmonte	Liberal
Quirino	Dakila Cua	Liberal	Dakila Cua	Liberal
Rizal–1st	Joel Duavit	NPC	Joel Duavit	NPC
Rizal–2nd	Isidro Rodriguez Jr.	NPC	Isidro Rodriguez Jr.	NPC
Romblon	Eleandro Jesus Madrona	Nacionalista	Eleandro Jesus Madrona	Nacionalista
Samar–1st	Mel Senen Sarmiento	Liberal	Mel Senen Sarmiento	Liberal
Samar–2nd	Milagrosa Tan	NPC	Milagrosa Tan	NPC
San Jose del Monte	Arthur Robes	Liberal	Arthur Robes	Liberal
San Juan	JV Ejercito	UNA	Ronaldo Zamora	Magdiwang
Sarangani	Manny Pacquiao	UNA	Manny Pacquiao	UNA
Siquijor	Orlando Fua	Lakas	Marie Anne Pernes	Liberal
Sorsogon–1st	Vacant		Evelina Escudero	NPC
Sorsogon–2nd	Deogracias Ramos Jr.	Liberal	Deogracias Ramos Jr.	Liberal
South Cotabato–1st	Pedro Acharon Jr.	NPC	Pedro Acharon Jr.	NPC
South Cotabato–2nd	Daisy Avance Fuentes	NPC	Dinand Hernandez	NPC
Southern Leyte	Roger Mercado	NUP	Damian Mercado	NUP
Sultan Kudarat–1st	Raden Sakaluran	Independent	Raden Sakaluran	Independent
Sultan Kudarat–2nd	Arnulfo Go	NUP	Arnulfo Go	NUP
Sulu–1st	Tupay Loong	NUP	Tupay Loong	NUP
Sulu–2nd	Nur-Ana Sahidulla	NPC	Maryam Arbison	Liberal
Surigao del Norte–1st	Francisco Matugas	Liberal	Francisco Matugas	Liberal
Surigao del Norte–2nd	Guillermo Romarate Jr.	Liberal	Guillermo Romarate Jr.	Liberal
Surigao del Sur–1st	Philip Pichay	Lakas	Philip Pichay	Lakas
Surigao del Sur–2nd	Florencio Garay	Liberal	Florencio Garay	Liberal
Taguig–Pateros	Arnel Cerafica	Liberal	Arnel Cerafica	Liberal
Taguig	Sigfrido Tiñga	Liberal	Lino Cayetano	Nacionalista
Tarlac–1st	Henry Cojuangco	NPC	Henry Cojuangco	NPC
Tarlac–2nd	Susan Yap	NPC	Susan Yap	NPC
Tarlac–3rd	Jeci Lapus	NUP	Noel Villanueva	Nacionalista
Tawi-Tawi	Nur Jaafar	NPC	Ruby Sahali	Liberal
Valenzuela–1st	Rex Gatchalian	NPC	Win Gatchalian	NPC
Valenzuela–2nd	Magi Gunigundo	Lakas	Magi Gunigundo	Lakas
Zambales–1st	Mitos Magsaysay	UNA	Jeffrey Khonghun	NPC
Zambales–2nd	Hermogenes Omar Ebdane III	SZP	Cheryl Deloso-Montalla	Liberal
Zamboanga City–1st	Beng Climaco	Liberal	Celso Lobregat	LDP
Zamboanga City–2nd	Erbie Fabian	Nacionalista	Lilia Macrohon-Nuño	Independent
Zamboanga del Norte–1st	Bullet Jalosjos	Nacionalista	Bullet Jalosjos	Nacionalista
Zamboanga del Norte–2nd	Rosendo Labadlabad	Liberal	Rosendo Labadlabad	Liberal
Zamboanga del Norte–3rd	Cesar Jalosjos	Nacionalista	Isagani Amatong	Liberal
Zamboanga del Sur–1st	Victor Yu	NPC	Victor Yu	NPC
Zamboanga del Sur–2nd	Aurora E. Cerilles	NPC	Aurora E. Cerilles	NPC
Zamboanga Sibugay–1st	Jonathan Yambao	Nacionalista	Belma Cabilao	Nacionalista
Zamboanga Sibugay–2nd	Jon-jon Jalosjos	Nacionalista	Dulce Ann Hofer	Liberal

=== Party-list election ===
The Commission on Elections was supposed to release results for the party-list election along with the results for the Senate election; however, the commission suspended the release of results after questions of whether to include votes for the twelve disqualified parties, although not with finality, were to be included or not. Canvassing of results for the party-list election resumed on May 19 after the 12 senators-elect were already proclaimed, with the commission meeting to determine on what to do with the votes of the twelve disqualified parties. On May 22, the commission announced that they will proclaim the winning parties, but not the number of seats.

Party	Votes	%	+/–	Seats	+/–
Buhay Hayaan Yumabong	1,270,608	4.59	+0.33	3	+1
A Teacher Partylist	1,042,863	3.77	+1.66	2	0
Bayan Muna	954,724	3.45	+0.90	2	0
1st Consumers Alliance for Rural Energy	934,915	3.38	+0.75	2	0
Akbayan	829,149	2.99	−0.62	2	0
Abono	768,265	2.77	+0.16	2	0
Ako Bicol Political Party	763,316	2.76	−2.44	2	−1
OFW Family Club	752,229	2.72	New	2	New
Gabriela Women's Party	715,250	2.58	−0.84	2	0
Coalition of Association of Senior Citizens in the Philippines	679,168	2.45	−1.96	2	0
Cooperative NATCCO Network Party	642,005	2.32	−0.90	2	0
Agricultural Sector Alliance of the Philippines	592,463	2.14	+0.38	2	+1
Citizens' Battle Against Corruption	584,906	2.11	−0.11	2	0
Magdalo para sa Pilipino	567,426	2.05	New	2	New
An Waray (Note: An Waray was initially entitled to two seats following the 2013 election. However after a re-computation ordered by the Supreme Court it was determined that An Waray only secured one seat. Victoria Noel assumed position as An Waray's second representative without a proclamation from the Commission on Elections.)	541,205	1.95	−0.47	1	−1
Abante Mindanao	466,114	1.68	+0.40	1	0
ACT Teachers	454,346	1.64	+0.37	1	0
Butil Farmers Party	439,557	1.59	−0.14	1	0
Anak Mindanao	382,267	1.38	+0.83	1	New
Anti-Crime and Terrorism Community Involvement and Support	377,165	1.36	+1.37	1	New
Kalinga-Advocacy for Social Empowerment and Nation-Building Through Easing Poverty	372,383	1.34	−0.56	1	0
LPG Marketers Association	370,897	1.34	−0.09	1	0
Trade Union Congress Party	369,286	1.33	+0.50	1	0
You against Corruption and Poverty	366,621	1.32	+0.18	1	0
Agri-Agra na Reforma para sa Magsasaka ng Pilipinas Movement	366,170	1.32	+1.16	1	New
Angkla: Ang Partido ng mga Pilipinong Marino	360,497	1.30	New	1	New
Arts Business and Science Professionals	359,587	1.30	+0.42	1	0
Democratic Independent Workers Association	341,820	1.23	+0.42	1	0
Kabataan	341,292	1.23	−0.19	1	0
Anakpawis	321,745	1.16	−0.37	1	0
Alay Buhay Community Development Foundation	317,355	1.15	+0.59	1	0
Ang Asosasyon Sang Mangunguma Nga Bisaya-Owa Mangunguma	312,312	1.13	−0.09	1	0
Social Amelioration & Genuine Intervention on Poverty	287,739	1.04	New	1	New
Alliance of Volunteer Educators	270,431	0.98	+0.24	1	0
Adhikaing Tinataguyod ng Kooperatiba	267,763	0.97	+0.37	1	0
Abang Lingkod	260,923	0.94	+0.83	1	New
1 Banat & Ahapo Coalition	245,529	0.89	New	1	New
Abakada Guro	244,754	0.88	+0.56	1	New
Ang Mata'y Alagaan	244,026	0.88	+0.67	1	New
Ang Nars	243,360	0.88	New	1	New
Ang National Coalition of Indigenous Peoples Action Na	241,505	0.87	New	1	New
Agbiag! Timpuyog Ilocano	240,841	0.87	−0.03	1	0
Append	236,353	0.85	+0.86	1	New
Ang Laban ng Indiginong Filipino	223,857	0.81	+0.03	0	−1
Ating Guro	214,080	0.77	New	0	0
Puwersa ng Bayaning Atleta	212,298	0.77	−0.11	0	−1
Aangat Tayo	207,855	0.75	+0.14	0	−1
Kasangga sa Kaunlaran	202,456	0.73	−0.28	0	−1
Bagong Henerasyon	190,001	0.69	−0.31	0	−1
Kapatiran ng mga Nakulong na Walang Sala	175,096	0.63	−0.17	0	−1
Piston Land Transport Coalition	174,976	0.63	New	0	0
Bayani	165,906	0.60	+0.34	0	0
Aksyon Magsasaka-Partido Tinig ng Masa	165,784	0.60	+0.04	0	0
Agrarian Development Association	164,702	0.59	+0.50	0	0
Isang Alyansang Aalalay sa Pinoy Skilled Workers	162,552	0.59	New	0	0
Abante Retirees Partylist Organization	161,915	0.58	+0.59	0	0
Katribu Indigenous Peoples Sectoral Party	153,844	0.56	+0.17	0	0
Association of Laborers and Employees	153,616	0.55	+0.56	0	0
1 Joint Alliance of Marginalized Group	153,072	0.55	−0.25	0	0
Action Brotherhood for Active Dreamers	150,854	0.54	−0.03	0	−1
Veterans Freedom Party	148,591	0.54	−0.01	0	0
Association of Philippine Electric Cooperatives	146,392	0.53	−0.54	0	−1
Pasang Masda Nationwide	134,944	0.49	+0.37	0	0
Una ang Pamilya	131,954	0.48	−0.26	0	−1
Alyansa ng mga Grupong Haligi ng Agham at Teknolohiya para sa Mamamayan	130,694	0.47	−0.36	0	−1
Ang Prolife	129,989	0.47	New	0	0
Pilipino Association for Country-Urban Poor Youth Advancement and Welfare	123,791	0.45	−0.04	0	0
1-United Transport Koalisyon	123,489	0.45	−0.30	0	−1
Isang Lapian ng Mangingisda at Bayan Tungo sa Kaunlaran	119,505	0.43	New	0	0
Isang Pangarap ng Bahay sa Bagong Buhay ng Maralitang Kababayan	117,516	0.42	+0.43	0	0
Akap Bata Sectoral Organization for Children	116,837	0.42	+0.05	0	0
Abante Katutubo	111,625	0.40	+0.31	0	0
Firm 24-K Association	103,316	0.37	+0.04	0	0
Alyansang Bayanihan ng mga Magsasaka Manggagawang Bukid at Mangingisda	102,021	0.37	−0.10	0	0
Ang Ladlad Lgbt Party	100,958	0.36	−0.02	0	0
Ang Agrikultura Natin Isulong	94,651	0.34	+0.14	0	0
Kasosyo Producer-Consumer Exchange Association	93,581	0.34	−0.27	0	−1
1 Bro-Philippine Guardians Brotherhood	88,603	0.32	New	0	0
Pilipinos with Disabilities	87,247	0.32	New	0	0
Sanlakas	86,854	0.31	New	0	0
Abante Tribung Makabansa	86,145	0.31	−0.20	0	0
Ako Ayoko sa Bawal na Droga	81,378	0.29	−0.02	0	0
Adhikain ng mga Dakilang Anak Maharlika	80,398	0.29	+0.06	0	0
Association for Righteousness Advocacy in Leadership	77,206	0.28	+0.14	0	0
Katipunan ng mga Anak ng Bayan All Filipino Democratic Movement	76,838	0.28	−0.29	0	0
Sectoral Party ang Minero	71,534	0.26	+0.12	0	0
Action League of Indigenous Masses	67,807	0.24	−0.06	0	0
Ating Agapay Sentrong Samahan ng mga Obrero	65,119	0.24	New	0	0
1-A Action Moral & Values Recovery Reform Philippines	65,095	0.24	+0.22	0	0
Aagapay sa Matatanda	59,844	0.22	+0.21	0	0
1 Guardians Nationalist of the Philippines	58,406	0.21	−0.20	0	0
Adhikain at Kilusan ng Ordinaryong Tao para sa Lupa Pabahay Hanapbuhay at Kaunlaran	51,806	0.19	+0.01	0	0
Migrante Sectoral Party of Overseas Filipinos and Their Families	51,431	0.19	New	0	0
Alyansa ng OFW Party	51,069	0.18	−0.13	0	0
Ugnayan ng Maralita Laban sa Kahirapan	45,492	0.16	New	0	0
Alliance for Rural Concerns	45,120	0.16	−0.04	0	0
Alliance of Bicolnon Party	44,324	0.16	−0.03	0	0
Blessed Federation of Farmers and Fishermen International	43,829	0.16	−0.05	0	0
Alliance of Advocates in Mining Advancement for National Progress	42,853	0.15	−0.01	0	0
Advance Community Development in New Generation	42,819	0.15	New	0	0
Alliance for Rural and Agrarian Reconstruction	41,257	0.15	−0.35	0	0
United Movement against Drug Foundation	41,023	0.15	+0.05	0	0
Association of Marine Officer & Ratings	40,955	0.15	New	0	0
Mamamayan Tungo sa Maunlad na Pilipinas	40,218	0.15	New	0	0
Anti-War/Anti-Terror Mindanao Peace Movement	39,206	0.14	+0.01	0	0
Green Force for the Environment Sons and Daughters of Mother Earth	30,581	0.11	−0.04	0	0
Agila ng Katutubong Pilipino	29,739	0.11	−0.25	0	0
Alyansa ng Media at Showbiz	28,263	0.10	+0.04	0	0
Alagad	27,883	0.10	−0.68	0	−1
Alliance for Philippines Security Guards Cooperative	27,400	0.10	+0.04	0	0
Kababaihang Lingkod Bayan sa Pilipinas	24,369	0.09	−0.09	0	0
1-Abilidad	21,900	0.08	+0.07	0	0
Alyansa Lumad Mindanao	19,381	0.07	+0.01	0	0
Total	27,687,240	100.00	–	58	+3
Valid votes	27,687,240	68.97	−9.91		
Invalid/blank votes	12,456,967	31.03	+9.91		
Total votes	40,144,207	100.00	–		
Registered voters/turnout	52,982,173	75.77	+1.43		
Source: COMELEC tally winning parties 1 2 3; Supreme Court: Abang Lingkod, Senior Citizens

=== Details ===
Region	Details	Seats won per party							Total seats
Region	Details	Lakas	Liberal	Nacionalista	NPC	NUP	UNA	Others & ind.	Total seats
I	Elections	1 / 12	2 / 12	2 / 12	6 / 12	0 / 12	—N/a	1 / 12	12 / 292
II	Elections	—N/a	2 / 10	2 / 10	4 / 10	2 / 10	0 / 10	0 / 10	10 / 292
III	Elections	1 / 21	8 / 21	2 / 21	3 / 21	4 / 21	0 / 21	3 / 21	21 / 292
IV-A	Elections	3 / 23	10 / 23	1 / 23	5 / 23	3 / 23	1 / 23	0 / 23	23 / 292
IV-B	Elections	0 / 8	4 / 8	1 / 8	1 / 8	1 / 8	0 / 8	1 / 8	8 / 292
V	Elections	4 / 16	6 / 16	1 / 16	3 / 16	2 / 16	0 / 16	0 / 16	16 / 292
VI	Elections	0 / 18	10 / 18	0 / 18	3 / 18	2 / 18	1 / 18	2 / 18	18 / 292
VII	Elections	1 / 16	8 / 16	1 / 16	4 / 16	1 / 16	1 / 16	0 / 16	16 / 292
VIII	Elections	1 / 12	7 / 12	1 / 12	1 / 12	2 / 12	0 / 12	0 / 12	12 / 292
IX	Elections	—N/a	4 / 9	2 / 9	1 / 9	0 / 9	0 / 9	2 / 9	9 / 292
X	Elections	—N/a	6 / 14	2 / 14	4 / 14	0 / 14	0 / 14	2 / 14	14 / 292
XI	Elections	1 / 11	6 / 11	2 / 11	0 / 11	2 / 11	—N/a	0 / 11	11 / 292
XII	Elections	—N/a	2 / 8	—N/a	2 / 8	1 / 8	1 / 8	2 / 8	8 / 292
Caraga	Elections	1 / 9	6 / 9	0 / 9	0 / 9	2 / 9	0 / 9	0 / 9	9 / 292
ARMM	Elections	0 / 8	7 / 8	0 / 8	0 / 8	1 / 8	0 / 8	0 / 8	8 / 292
CAR	Elections	—N/a	5 / 7	0 / 7	1 / 7	0 / 7	0 / 7	1 / 7	7 / 292
NCR	Elections	1 / 32	19 / 32	2 / 32	3 / 32	1 / 32	6 / 32	0 / 32	32 / 292
Party-list	Election	—N/a	2 / 58	—N/a	—N/a	—N/a	—N/a	51 / 58	58 / 292
Total		14 / 292	114 / 292	18 / 292	42 / 292	24 / 292	10 / 292	65 / 292	287 / 292

=== Seat totals ===
Party/coalition	Seats			
Party/coalition	District	Party-list	Totals	%
Liberal coalition	112	2	114	39.0%
NPC	43	0	43	14.7%
NUP	24	0	24	8.2%
Nacionalista	17	0	17	5.8%
Lakas	14	0	14	4.8%
UNA coalition	10	0	10	3.4%
Makabayan	0	7	7	2.4%
LDP	2	0	2	0.7%
CDP	1	0	1	0.3%
Kambilan	1	0	1	0.3%
KBL	1	0	1	0.3%
PPPL	1	0	1	0.3%
Unang Sigaw	1	0	1	0.3%
United Negros Alliance	1	0	1	0.3%
Other party-list representatives	0	49	49	16.8%
Independent	6	0	6	2.1%
Totals	234	53	248	98.3%

== Aftermath ==
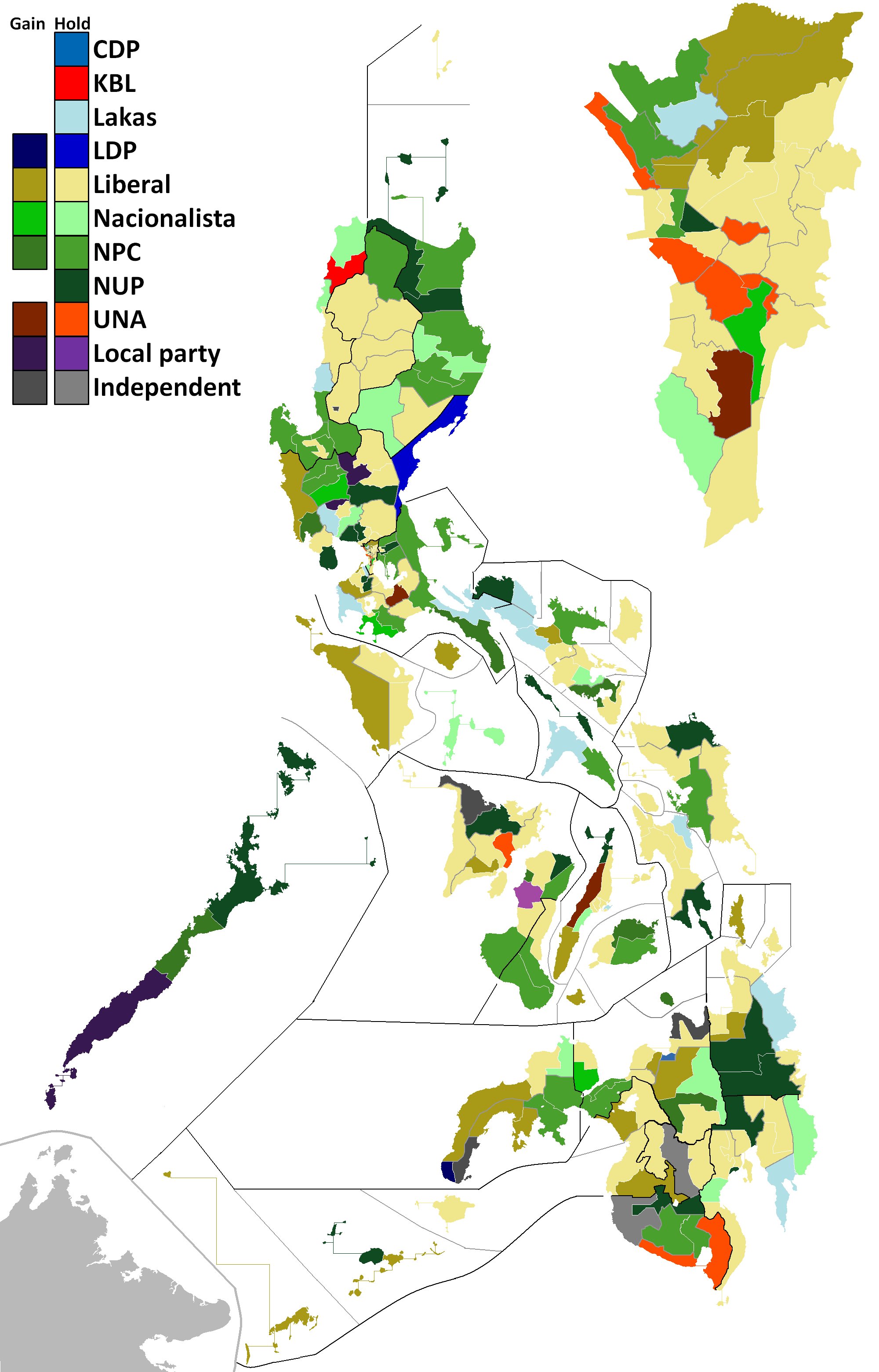
Same as above, but showing district gains and losses.

Preliminary results states that President Aquino's allies winning an overwhelming majority of seats in the House of Representatives. This makes Aquino the only president enjoy majorities in both houses of Congress since the People Power Revolution of 1986. This is seen as an endorsement of the voters of Aquino's reformist agenda; although several key wins elsewhere by the United Nationalist Alliance and its allies would mean that Aquino's chosen successor may face a significant challenge in the 2016 presidential election.

Speaker Feliciano Belmonte, Jr. is seen to keep his speakership position with the Liberals winning at least 100 out of the 234 district seats. Majority Leader Neptali Gonzales II said that a great majority of incumbents are poised to successfully defend their seats, and that the Liberal Party are to be the single largest party in the lower house. The Nacionalista Party has at least 15 winning representatives, "a substantial number" of the 40 incumbents Nationalist People's Coalition are to hold their seats, and the 34-member National Unity Party House leader Rodolfo Antonino expects Belmonte to be reelected as speaker. The United Nationalist Alliance won three seats in Metro Manila, and at least 2 more seats outside the metropolis.

=== Election for the Speakership ===
15th Congress Speaker Feliciano Belmonte, Jr. easily won reelection for the speakership. The race for minority leader, usually given to the person finishing second in the speakership race, was narrowly won by Ronaldo Zamora over Ferdinand Martin Romualdez. There was one abstention, from Toby Tiangco, who wanted to be an independent. Belmonte also abstained from voting, while Romaualdez and Zamora voted for themselves; if Belmonte only had one opponent he would've voted for his opponent, and his opponent would've voted for him (as seen in the 15th Congress speakership election). Since there were more than two nominees, the traditional courtesy votes did not push through.

Speakership election
Candidate	Party	Total	%
Feliciano Belmonte, Jr.	Liberal	244	83.6%
Ronaldo Zamora	UNA/Magdiwang	19	6.5%
Ferdinand Martin Romualdez	Lakas	16	5.5%
Abstention		2	0.7%
Answered to the roll call		271	92.8%
Arrived after the roll call		10	3.4%
Total who voted		281	96.2%
Total proclaimed representatives		289	98.3%
Total representatives		292	100%

Blocs
Bloc	Total	%
Majority	245	83.9%
Minority	19	6.5%
Independent	16	5.8%
No membership	8	2.7%
Vacancies	3	1.0%
Total	292	100%

== See also ==
- 15th Congress of the Philippines
