= Abdul Sahrin =

Moro revolutionary and politician (died 2021)

Deputy Chief Minister for the Island Provinces of Bangsamoro
- In office February 22, 2019 – January 20, 2021
- Appointed by: Bangsamoro Transition Authority Parliament
- Chief Minister: Murad Ebrahim
- Preceded by: Office created
- Succeeded by: Albakil Jikiri

Member of the Bangsamoro Transition Authority Parliament
- In office March 29, 2019 – January 20, 2021
- Chief Minister: Murad Ebrahim
- Appointed by: Rodrigo Duterte

Personal details
- Born: 1950 or 1951
- Died: January 20, 2021 (aged 70)
- Citizenship: Filipino
- Nickname(s): Hassan Jawali; Cong
- Military career
- Allegiance: MNLF
- Conflicts: Moro conflict

Abdul Raji Sahrin, also known as Hassan Jawali (1950/1951 – January 20, 2021), was a Moro revolutionary and politician. He was a member of the Moro National Liberation Front (MNLF) and the Interim Bangsamoro Parliament. He was also the Deputy Chief Minister of Bangsamoro for the Islands.

== Background ==
=== Moro National Liberation Front ===
As a member of the Moro National Liberation Front (MNLF) from Batch 300, he was affiliated with the group's Sema faction. Sahrin was secretary general of the MNLF.

Sahrin, speaking on behalf of the MNLF Senior Leaders' Forum, condemned Nur Misuari and his secessionist bid, following the Zamboanga City crisis of 2013.

=== Bangsamoro ===
When the Bangsamoro Basic Law was being drafted, Sahrin was skeptical of the formation of a Moro Islamic Liberation Front-led (MILF) Bangsamoro region. Noting the rivalry of the Tausūgs and Maguindanaons, he said that the former don't want the latter to govern over them expressing preference for the formation of two autonomous regions under a federal government; one in the Sulu archipelago and the other in Central Mindanao.

When the Bangsamoro region was formed in 2019, Sahrin became part of the Bangsamoro Transition Authority. Sahrin was appointed the Deputy Chief Minister of Bangsamoro for the Islands by interim Chief Minister Murad Ebrahim. He served alongside Ali Solaiman, who was appointed deputy for the mainland. The BTA later served as the Interim Bangsamoro Parliament, with Sahrin helping the regional government attend to the affairs of Bangsamoro's island province.

As member of the parliament, he was the principal author of the legislation which formalized the adoption of the Bangsamoro Parliament seal. He co-authored five other bills.

=== Death ===
Sahrin died in office on January 20, 2021, at the Zamboanga Peninsula Medical Center due to a brain tumor. He was 70 years old.
