= 2013 Philippine House of Representatives elections in the Autonomous Region in Muslim Mindanao =

Elections were held in the ARMM for seats in the House of Representatives of the Philippines on May 13, 2013.

The candidate with the most votes won that district's seat for the 16th Congress of the Philippines.

== Summary ==
Party	Popular vote	%	Swing	Seats won	Change
Liberal				6	
NUP				2	
Lakas				1	
NPC				0	
Ompia				0	
PDP–Laban				0	
PMP				0	
UNA				0	
Independent				0	
Valid votes					
Invalid votes					
Turnout					
Registered voters					

== Basilan ==
Hadji Hataman-Salliman is the incumbent.

2013 Philippine House of Representatives election at Basilan
Party	Candidate	Votes	%	±%
Liberal	Hadji Hataman-Salliman			
PDP–Laban	Yusoph Mando			
Margin of victory				
Rejected ballots				
Turnout				
Liberal hold		Swing		

== Lanao del Sur ==
=== 1st District ===
Incumbent Hussein Pangandaman is running as an independent.

2013 Philippine House of Representatives election at Lanao del Sur's 1st district
Party	Candidate	Votes	%	±%
Liberal	Ansaruddin Alonto Adiong			
PDP–Laban	Faysah Dumarpa			
Independent	Hussein Pangandaman			
Independent	Monaoray Saripada			
Margin of victory				
Rejected ballots				
Turnout				
Liberal gain from Independent		Swing		

=== 2nd District ===
Pangalian Balindong is the incumbent.

2013 Philippine House of Representatives election at Lanao del Sur's 2nd district
Party	Candidate	Votes	%	±%
Liberal	Pangalian Balindong			
Independent	Bolkisah Bantuas			
Ompia	Salih Abdul Benito			
PDP–Laban	Benasing Macarambon			
Margin of victory				
Rejected ballots				
Turnout				
Liberal hold		Swing		

== Maguindanao ==
=== 1st District ===
Bai Sandra Sema is Incumbent and she will face former Congresswoman Bai Sendig Dilangalen.

2013 Philippine House of Representatives election at Maguindanao's 1st district
Party	Candidate	Votes	%	±%
PMP	Baisendig Dilangalen			
Independent	Sindatu Dilanganen			
PDP–Laban	Guiamalodin Mohamad			
Liberal	Bai Sandra Sema			
Margin of victory				
Rejected ballots				
Turnout				
Liberal hold		Swing		

=== 2nd District ===
Incumbent Simeon Datumanong is term-limited; his Lakas–CMD nominated Annie Datumanong, his daughter, as their nominee. Her primary opponent is Pandag Mayor Zajid Mangudadatu.

2013 Philippine House of Representatives election at Maguindanao's 2nd district
Party	Candidate	Votes	%	±%
Independent	Habbas Camendan			
Independent	Basit Esmael			
Liberal	Zajid Mangudadatu			
Independent	Jaafar Apollo Matalam			
Independent	Pendatun Pangadil			
Lakas	Annie Datumanong			
Independent	Solaiman Sandigan			
PMP	Ali Sangki			
Margin of victory				
Rejected ballots				
Turnout				
Liberal gain from Lakas		Swing		

== Sulu ==
=== 1st District ===
Tupay Loong is Incumbent.

2013 Philippine House of Representatives election at Sulu's 1st district
Party	Candidate	Votes	%	±%
NPC	Alvarez Isnaji			
NUP	Tupay Loong			
Independent	Tarhata Misuari			
Margin of victory				
Rejected ballots				
Turnout				
NUP hold		Swing		

=== 2nd District ===
Nur Ana Sahidulla is the incumbent.

2013 Philippine House of Representatives election at Sulu's 2nd district
Party	Candidate	Votes	%	±%
Liberal	Maryam Arbison			
NPC	Nur Ana Sahidulla			
Margin of victory				
Rejected ballots				
Turnout				
Liberal gain from NPC		Swing		

== Tawi Tawi ==
Incumbent Nur Jaafar is term limited and running for the governorship. Anuar Abubakar is his party's nominee.

2013 Philippine House of Representatives election at Tawi-Tawi
Party	Candidate	Votes	%	±%
NPC	Anuar Abubakar			
UNA	Ismael Abubakar Jr.			
Independent	Ibrahim Albani			
Liberal	Ruby Sahali			
Margin of victory				
Rejected ballots				
Turnout				
Liberal gain from NPC		Swing		
