= Deputy Chief Minister of Bangsamoro =

Deputy chief ministers of Bangsamoro
- Incumbent; Mamintal Adiong III (Deputy Chief Minister for North Central Mindanao); Hadjimar Matba (Deputy Chief Minister for South Western Mindanao) since October 30, 2026
- Nominator: Chief Minister
- Appointer: Bangsamoro Parliament
- Constituting instrument: Bangsamoro Organic Law
- Inaugural holder: Ali Solaiman (Deputy Chief Minister for North Central Mindanao); Abdul Sahrin (Deputy Chief Minister for South Western Mindanao)
- Formation: 2019; 7 years ago
- Succession: First, the deputy chief minister senior in age becomes acting chief minister in the event of a vacancy

The deputy chief ministers of Bangsamoro are the second-highest executive officials of Bangsamoro, an autonomous region within the Philippines, next to the chief minister.

== Background ==
=== Function ===
The Bangsamoro Organic Law (BOL) mandates the appointment of two deputy chief ministers who are tasked with assisting the chief minister of Bangsamoro. The chief minister nominates the deputies, with the Bangsamoro Parliament electing to confirm or deny the nominations.

Deputy chief ministers are permitted to hold a cabinet position. In the case of the death, permanent incapacity, or resignation of the chief minister of Bangsamoro, the deputy chief minister who is more senior in age will act as chief minister until the parliament elects a new chief minister, within 30 days of the vacancy as mandated by law.

=== Eligibility ===
The deputies are required by law to hail from a subregion different from that of the chief minister. The BOL names three subregions for the purpose of appointing deputies, namely south-western Mindanao, north-central Mindanao, and south-central Mindanao, with the exact scope of the regions to be determined by the parliament.

The first set of deputies did not exactly follow the subregion naming scheme as provided by the BOL. The first two holders were each referred to as "deputy for the mainland" and "deputy for the islands". The areas of jurisdiction are alternatively referred to as North Central Mindanao and South Western Mindanao, respectively. The BOL also obliged the interim chief minister to ensure that the interim deputy chief ministers were members of the Bangsamoro Transition Authority.

== List ==
=== Deputy Chief Minister for North Central Mindanao ===
Portrait	Name (Lifespan)	Term start	Term end	Term length	Party (Note: For deputy chief ministers during the tenure of the Bangsamoro Transition Authority, their nominators are stated.)	Chief minister (Tenure)	Cabinet
	Ali Solaiman; Member of the BTA (born 1952); Interim	February 22, 2019	October 30, 2026	7 years, 250 days	MILF	Murad Ebrahim (2019–2025)	Ebrahim (interim)
	Ali Solaiman; Member of the BTA (born 1952); Interim	February 22, 2019	October 30, 2026	7 years, 250 days	MILF	Abdulraof Macacua (since 2025)	Macacua (interim)
	Mamintal Adiong III; Proportional MP (born 1991)	October 30, 2026	Incumbent	3 days	BGC	Abdulraof Macacua (since 2025)	Macacua

=== Deputy Chief Minister for South Western Mindanao ===
Portrait	Name (Lifespan)	Term start	Term end	Term length	Party	Chief minister (Tenure)	Cabinet
	Abdul Sahrin; Member of the BTA (1950/1951–2021); Interim	February 22, 2019	January 20, 2021 (Note: Died in office.)	1 year, 333 days	MILF	Murad Ebrahim (2019–2025)	Ebrahim
Vacant (January 20 – December 1, 2021)						Murad Ebrahim (2019–2025)	Ebrahim
	Albakil Jikiri; Member of the BTA (born 1980); Interim	December 1, 2021	December 11, 2024	3 years, 10 days	National Government	Murad Ebrahim (2019–2025)	Ebrahim
	Hatimil Hassan; Member of the BTA (born 1949); Interim	December 11, 2024	October 30, 2026	1 year, 323 days	National Government	Murad Ebrahim (2019–2025)	Ebrahim
	Hatimil Hassan; Member of the BTA (born 1949); Interim	December 11, 2024	October 30, 2026	1 year, 323 days	National Government	Abdulraof Macacua (since 2025)	Macacua (interim)
	Hadjimar Matba; MP for Tawi-Tawi–2nd (born 1988)	October 30, 2026	Incumbent	3 days	PBP	Abdulraof Macacua (since 2025)	Macacua
