= 2013 Philippine House of Representatives elections in Northern Mindanao =

Elections were held in the Northern Mindanao for seats in the House of Representatives of the Philippines on May 13, 2013.

The candidate with the most votes won that district's seat for the 16th Congress of the Philippines.

== Summary ==
Party	Popular vote	%	Swing	Seats won	Change
Liberal				5	
NPC				4	
Nacionalista				2	
BPP				1	
CDP				1	
Aksyon				0	
LDP				0	
LM				0	
NUP				0	
PLM				0	
UNA				0	
Independent				1	
Valid votes				14	
Invalid votes					
Turnout					
Registered voters					

== Bukidnon ==
Bukidnon was redistricted into four districts after the candidacies were submitted. As a result, the Commission on Elections (Philippines) will take into account the places where the nominees are registered to determine on what district they are running under.

=== 1st District ===
Jesus Emmanuel Paras is the incumbent.

2013 Philippine House of Representatives election at Bukidnon's 1st district
Party	Candidate	Votes	%	±%
Liberal	Maria Lourdes Acosta			
Independent	Candido Pancrudo			
NPC	Jesus Emmanuel Paras			
Margin of victory				
Rejected ballots				
Turnout				
Liberal gain from NPC		Swing		

=== 2nd District ===
Incumbent Florencio Flores is running unopposed.

2013 Philippine House of Representatives election at Bukidnon's 3rd district
Party	Candidate	Votes	%	±%
Nacionalista	Florencio Flores			
Margin of victory				
Rejected ballots				
Turnout				
Nacionalista hold		Swing		

=== 3rd District ===
Incumbent from the predistricted third district Jose Ma. Zubiri III found himself running at the redistricted 3rd district. His Bukidnon Paglaum party is in an electoral alliance with the Liberal Party.

2013 Philippine House of Representatives election at Bukidnon's 2nd district
Party	Candidate	Votes	%	±%
Aksyon	Ruth Acosta			
BPP	Jose Zubiri III			
Margin of victory				
Rejected ballots				
Turnout				
BPP hold		Swing		

=== 4th District ===
The seat for the redistricted 4th District is open.

2013 Philippine House of Representatives election at Bukidnon's 3rd district
Party	Candidate	Votes	%	±%
Liberal	Wenifredo Agripo			
Independent	Glenn Peduche			
NPC	Oniel Roque			
Margin of victory				
Rejected ballots				
Turnout				
NPC win (new seat)				

== Cagayan de Oro ==
=== 1st District ===
Jose Benjamin Benaldo is the incumbent.

2013 Philippine House of Representatives election at Cagayan de Oro's 1st district
Party	Candidate	Votes	%	±%
Nacionalista	Jose Benjamin Benaldo			
Aksyon	Alvin Calingin			
LDP	Constantino Jaraula			
Independent	Ricarte Nagac			
Liberal	Rolando Uy			
Margin of victory				
Rejected ballots				
Turnout				
Liberal gain from Nacionalista		Swing		

=== 2nd District ===
Rufus Rodriguez is the incumbent.

2013 Philippine House of Representatives election at Cagayan de Oro's 2nd district
Party	Candidate	Votes	%	±%
Independent	Leodegario Lagrimas			
UNA	Ian Mark Nacaya			
CDP	Rufus Rodriguez			
Independent	Eric Saarenas			
Margin of victory				
Rejected ballots				
Turnout				
CDP hold		Swing		

== Camiguin ==
Incumbent Pedro Romualdo's opponent is former member of parliament Homobono Adaza. However, Romualdo died on April 23, 2013. His grandson Xavier who is one of the top 10 in 2012 bar exam as his replacement candidate.

2013 Philippine House of Representatives election at Camiguin
Party	Candidate	Votes	%	±%
Nacionalista	Homobono Adaza			
NPC	Xavier Jesus Romualdo			
Margin of victory				
Rejected ballots				
Turnout				
NPC win				

== Lanao del Norte ==
=== 1st District ===
Imelda Dimaporo is the incumbent.

2013 Philippine House of Representatives election at Lanao del Norte's 1st district
Party	Candidate	Votes	%	±%
Liberal	Madrid Elias Ali			
NPC	Imelda Dimaporo			
Independent	Roberto Quico, Jr.			
Margin of victory				
Rejected ballots				
Turnout				
NPC hold		Swing		

=== 2nd District ===
Incumbent Fatimah Aliah Dimaporo is not running. Former Representative. Abdullah Dimaporo is her party's nominee.

2013 Philippine House of Representatives election at Lanao del Norte's 2nd district
Party	Candidate	Votes	%	±%
Liberal	Acmad Omar			
NPC	Abdullah Dimaporo			
Margin of victory				
Rejected ballots				
Turnout				
NPC hold		Swing		

== Iligan ==
Vicente Belmonte, Jr. is incumbent.

2013 Philippine House of Representatives election at Iligan
Party	Candidate	Votes	%	±%
NUP	Jose Noel Arquiz			
Liberal	Vicente Belmonte, Jr.			
Independent	Jose Booc			
PLM	Uriel Borja			
Independent	Samson Dajao			
Independent	Alberto Ora			
Margin of victory				
Rejected ballots				
Turnout				
Liberal hold		Swing		

== Misamis Occidental ==
=== 1st District ===
Jorge Almonte is the incumbent.

2013 Philippine House of Representatives election at Misamis Occidental's 1st district
Party	Candidate	Votes	%	±%
Liberal	Jorge Almonte			
Independent	Franklin Omandam			
Margin of victory				
Rejected ballots				
Turnout				
Liberal hold		Swing		

=== 2nd District ===
Loreto Leo Ocampos is the incumbent.

2013 Philippine House of Representatives election at Misamis Occidental's 2nd district
Party	Candidate	Votes	%	±%
Nacionalista	Henry Oaminal			
Liberal	Loreto Leo Ocampos			
Margin of victory				
Rejected ballots				
Turnout				
Nacionalista gain from Liberal		Swing		

== Misamis Oriental ==
=== 1st District ===
Peter Unabia is the incumbent.

2013 Philippine House of Representatives election at Misamis Oriental's 1st district
Party	Candidate	Votes	%	±%
Independent	Henry Clyde C. Abott			
Liberal	Peter Unabia			
LM	Rommel S. Zagada			
Margin of victory				
Rejected ballots				
Turnout				
Liberal hold		Swing		

=== 2nd District ===
Incumbent Yevgeny Vincent Emano opted not to run again for a 3rd and final term. Instead, he is running for governorship. Augusto H. Baculio is his party's nominee.

2013 Philippine House of Representatives election at Misamis Oriental's 2nd District
Party	Candidate	Votes	%	±%
Nacionalista	Augusto H. Baculio			
Independent	Antonio P. Calingin			
Liberal	Jesus M. Jardin			
Independent	Juliet Uy			
Margin of victory				
Rejected ballots				
Turnout				
Independent gain from Nacionalista		Swing		
