= Albakil Jikiri =

Filipino politician

- اَلْبَكِلْ جِكِرِ
- Official portrait, 2025

Deputy Chief Minister for the Island Provinces of Bangsamoro
- Incumbent
- Assumed office December 1, 2021
- Chief Minister: Murad Ebrahim
- Preceded by: Abdul Sahrin

Member of the Bangsamoro Transition Authority Parliament
- Incumbent
- Assumed office September 23, 2021
- Nominated by: Philippine national government
- Appointed by: Rodrigo Duterte
- Chief Minister: Murad Ebrahim

Personal details
- Born: Albakil Dasani Jikiri; December 12, 1980 (age 45) Indanan, Sulu, Philippines
- Parent(s): Yusop Jikiri; Harija Dasani
- Military career
- Allegiance: MNLF
- Conflicts: Moro conflict

Albakil "Thong" Dasani Jikiri is a Moro Filipino who is a member of the Bangsamoro Transition Authority Parliament and the Deputy Chief Minister of Bangsamoro for the Islands.

== Early life and education ==
Albakil Jikiri was born in December 12, 1980 in Indanan, Sulu to Yusop Jikiri and Dayang Dayang Harija Dasani. He used Dasani as his last name for security reasons during his elementary school years in Bakud Elementary School in Jolo due to his father's association with the Moro National Liberation Front (MNLF). After the 1996 Final Peace Agreement was signed between the Philippine government and the MNLF, he began using his paternal family name. By this time, he was already attending high school at the Notre Dame High School for Boys in Jolo. He obtained a bachelor's degree in Political science at the Universidad de Zamboanga.

== Career ==
=== Moro National Liberation Front ===
Jikiri is the son of Yusop Jikiri who is chairman of a faction within the Moro National Liberation Front. In January 2021, few months after his father's death, he was designatied as MNLF National Vice Chairman for Military Affairs. The faction expressed support to the presidential campaign of Bongbong Marcos for the 2022 elections.

=== Sulu government ===
Jikiri is elected as a member of the Sulu provincial board in 2007 and municipal councilor of Indanan in 2013.

=== Bangsamoro government ===
Jikiri would be appointed to the Bangsamoro Transition Authority Parliament by President Rodrigo Duterte on September 23, 2021 to fill in the seat of parliament member Abdul Sahrin who died in office. In December 1, 2021, he was named as Deputy Chief Minister of Bangsamoro for the Islands filling in the position which was also held by Sahrin.
