= Ministry of Labor and Employment (Bangsamoro) =

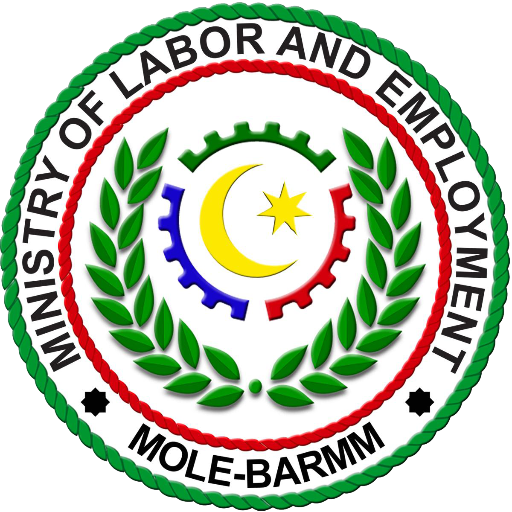

Agency overview
- Formed: 2019; 7 years ago
- Jurisdiction: Bangsamoro
- Headquarters: Cotabato City, Maguindanao del Norte, Philippines
- Minister responsible: Muslimin Sema, Minister of Labor and Employment
- Deputy Minister responsible: Tommy Nawa
- Website: mole.bangsamoro.gov.ph

The Ministry of Labor and Employment (MOLE) is the regional executive department of the Bangsamoro Autonomous Region in Muslim Mindanao (BARMM) responsible for affairs relating to labor and employment in the region.
