= Ali Solaiman =

Deputy Chief Minister of Bangsamoro since 2019

- Official portrait, 2026

Deputy Chief Minister for the Mainland Provinces of Bangsamoro
- Incumbent
- Assumed office February 22, 2019
- Appointed by: Bangsamoro Transition Authority Parliament
- Chief Minister: Murad Ebrahim
- Preceded by: Office created

Member of the Bangsamoro Transition Authority Parliament
- In office March 29, 2019 – January 20, 2021
- Nominated by: Moro Islamic Liberation Front
- Chief Minister: Murad Ebrahim
- Appointed by: Rodrigo Duterte

Personal details
- Citizenship: Filipino
- Military career
- Allegiance: MILF
- Conflicts: Moro conflict

Ali Bangcola Solaiman is a Moro revolutionary and politician. He is a member of the Moro Islamic Liberation Front (MILF) and the Interim Bangsamoro Parliament. He is also the Deputy Chief Minister of Bangsamoro for the Mainland.

He serves as the Moro Islamic Liberation Front's 2nd Vice Chairman and is also a member of the group's central committee.

When the Bangsamoro region was formed in 2019, Solaiman became part of the Bangsamoro Transition Authority. Solaiman was appointed as the Deputy Chief Minister of Bangsamoro for the Mainland by interim Chief Minister Murad Ebrahim. He served alongside Abdul Sahrin, who was appointed as deputy for the islands. The BTA later served as the Interim Bangsamoro Parliament.

Solaiman also heads the parliament's Special Committee on Marawi as its chairman. The body is responsible for overseeing the rehabilitation of Marawi, following the city's destruction in the 2017 Marawi siege.
