= Bangsamoro Party =

Bangsamoro Party (BAPA)
- Ideology: Moro self-determinism
- National affiliation: MNLF Executive Council of 15
- Colors: Red
- House of Representatives: 0 / 8 (Bangsamoro seats only)
- Provincial governors: 0 / 6 (Bangsamoro only)
- Provincial vice governors: 0 / 6 (Bangsamoro only)
- Provincial board members: 0 / 46 (Bangsamoro regular seats only)
- Bangsamoro Parliament: 0 / 80

The Bangsamoro Party (BAPA) is a political party based in Mindanao, Philippines, affiliated with the MNLF Executive Council of 15 (MNLF EC-15).

== History ==
The Bangsamoro Party is a political party affiliated with the Muslimin Sema-led faction of the Moro National Liberation Front (MNLF). It was already extant sometime between 2016 and 2018 during the implementation of the United Nations Development Programme (UNDP) "Peace and Reconciliation Initiatives for Empowerment (PRIME) in the Bangsamoro" when the MNLF is led by Executive Council of 15 chair Yusop Jikiri.

The MNLF under Jikiri's successor Muslimin Sema launched the Bangsamoro Party (BAPA) on January 8, 2022. The ceremony was held at the MNLF's Camp Ebrahim Sema and was attended by representatives from Basilan, Sulu, Tawi-Tawi, Zamboanga del Sur, Zamboanga Sibugay, Lanao del Sur, Lanao del Norte, Maguindanao and Soccsksargen's four provinces. The party is presented as a supporter of the Bangsamoro government which is administered by interim Chief Minister Murad Ebrahim, who is also the chair of the MNLF's rival group Moro Islamic Liberation Front.

== See also ==
- United Bangsamoro Justice Party
