= Yusop Jikiri =

Filipino politician (1954–2020)

Yusop (also Yusoph) Jikiri (1954 – October 17, 2020) was a Filipino politician, leader within the Moro National Liberation Front (MNLF) and governor (2001–2004) of Sulu Province in the Autonomous Region in Muslim Mindanao (ARMM). He also served as a representative from Sulu's 1st District (2007–10) and ran again in 2010, but lost to Tupay Loong. He was the beneficiary of shifting political alliances between the Tan and Loong families. Jikiri served as the Jolo-based chairman for the MNLF from 2017 until his death in 2020 from bone cancer.

== Background ==
Jikiri was born in 1951 as the son of a poor farmer in Indanan, named after a famous Moro leader/bandit under the American occupation during the Moro Rebellion. He attended Indanan Elementary, National High School, and attended college but did not finish his bachelor's degree due to the outbreak of war in 1970. He married four times and has several children; one of his sons, Thong Jikiri, is a provincial board member in the 1st District of Sulu. also she has a daughter from Davao named Sana-a.

== Involvement in the MNLF ==
Jikiri joined the Moro National Liberation Front and became one of their top commanders, eventually rising to become Chief of Staff under Nur Misuari.

In 2000 he joined 14 other MNLF officials to sign a manifesto leading to the ouster of Misuari as its leader. The so-called Council of 15 accused Misuari of being incompetent as governor of the ARMM and was led by Muslimin Sema.

== Political activities ==
=== Governor in 2001 ===
Jikiri ran for governor of Sulu in 1998 and again in 2001 as a candidate of the People Power Coalition, a party affiliated with the MNLF. In 2001 he won, with his party (the PPC-MNLF) winning eight of the ten seats in the provincial board. His running mate was Abdel S. Anni and his campaign coordinator was Omar Bailang. It was his second try for the governorship of Sulu since the MNLF joined mainstream politics after the 1996 GRP-MNLF peace agreement. He claimed upon his victory that he only had P100,000 when he first decided to run, attributing the rest to a "modest contribution" by former Governor Tupay Loong.

Announcement of official election results were initially delayed by several contests on the results to the Commission on Elections (COMELEC). Responding to news of the delay, Jikiri's supporters stormed the gates of Camp Teodulfo Bautista (104th Army Brigade), where the COMELEC canvassing office was located. Tens of minibuses were arranged to transport supporters from different municipalities to the base.

Jikiri was sworn into office by President Gloria Macapagal Arroyo in Malacanang. In his victory speech, he vowed to emancipate the province from "poverty and ignorance" and called on the people to help it regain its historic past as a "great nation of a great people." He also urged his fellow Tausugs to move forward with peace, devoting their time and efforts on education, agriculture, infrastructure and transport development, counter-narcotics, sports development, and health services.

My government is your government, for truly I belong to you, I am among you, a son of a poor family. To this land I give my life, body and soul. Let me, therefore, seek your cooperation. Come to me as your elder brother, (or) even as your father and together we can make this land great once more in history.

The two congressional seats in Sulu province went to Jikiri's party mate Munir Arbison (2nd district) and Nationalist People's Coalition (NPC) representative Hussin Amin (1st district).

=== 2003 Attacks ===
In September 2003 Jikiri was the target of an ambush staged by Abu Sayyaf Group leader Albader Parad in Indanan. Jikiri survived the attack, but one of his aides was killed.

=== 2004 and 2007 Elections ===
Jikiri ran again in 2004 but lost the governor seat to former Vice Governor Ben T. Loong. He came back to run in the 2007 elections and won the seat as representative. He also became Southern Philippines Development Authority (SPDA) chairman.

=== Role as MNLF Chairman ===
In 2017, Yusop Jikiri assumed chairmanship of the MNLF Council of Leaders. As chairman, he led the MNLF on a strongly pro-Government course, conducting joint operations with the Armed Forces of the Philippines against insurgents with the Abu Sayyaf Group. Jikiri was also instrumental in preventing the political exclusion of Sulo-based MNLF factions in the formation of the Bangsamoro Autonomous Region in Muslim Mindanao (BARMM). He was also considered close to Malaysian security forces.

Under his leadership, the MNLF integrated roughly 7,500 former MNFL insurgents into the Philippines Armed Forces as part of obligations under the 1996 Peace Agreement. However, many of those 7,500 were not real fighters, but instead younger-relatives who could more easily pass the registration process.

Throughout his leadership, Jikiri also utilised his position to secure key political positions within the MNLF for family members and allies.

==== Anti-Kidnapping Task Force ====
A key aspect of Jikiri's leadership was his creation of the Anti-Kidnapping Task Force (AKTF). The unit was proposed as a MNLF policing force that could pursue and interdict gangs of the Abu Sayyaf Group that was regularly conducting kidnap-for-ransom attacks across the Sulu at the time. In June 2017, the then-Commander of Joint Task Force Sulu, Cirilito Sobejana greenlit Jikiri's proposal under the condition that the MNLF unit would act in a supporting role to the JTF-Sulu, tasked with restricting the movement of Abu Sayyaf groups, but without the authority to act unilaterally.

In 2019, Jikiri appointed Tahir Sali as the commander of the AKTF. Sali came from a prominent MNLF family, but also had family ties to the chief of the Abu Sayyaf group, and had been allegedly involved in Abu Sayyaf attacks previously, including a September 2009 bombing in Indanan that killed two US Special Forces members and an AFP soldier. By 2016 Sali had changed alliances to the MNLF, but his ties allowed him to become an effective mediator between Abu Sayyaf members who were considering surrender and Bangsamoro forces, without involving the armed forces.

The AKTF also provided a useful vehicle for confidence building between the MNFL and the AFP, and acted as a way to incorporate MNFL fighters into an allied unit in the absence of more robust decommissioning processes.

=== Relations with other Sulu political leaders ===
Jikiri's relationship with Muslimin Sema was complex, having allied with Sema during the 2001 MNLF Mutiny, the two would later develop competing interests during Jikiri's chairmanship. This led to a fracturing of MNLF factions following Jikiri's death and the perceived marginalisation of Sulu factions of the MNLF.

Jikiri also had a longstanding political rivalry with Sulu Governor Abdursakur Tan.The governor was a strong opponent of the BARMM process, of which Jikiri helped facilitate to ensure Sulu's inclusion. Following Jikiri's death, Tan was described as the biggest beneficiary, immediately mobilising his political networks against integration into the Mindanao-mainland's BARMM process.

== Death and succession ==
Yusop Jikiri died on October 17, 2020 of bone cancer. Philippines Commander of the Joint Chiefs Gilbert Gapay said upon Jikiri's death that said Jikiri was “one of the strong pillars” who advocated trust and respect as key to achieving lasting peace and development in the Bangsamoro.

Prior to his death, Jikiri had made it clear that it was his expectation as MNLF chairman that the organisation would run with joint chairpersons splitting control of the organisation between the Sulu factions and the Mindanao faction, with power shared between Sema and Jikiri's successor.

Despite this, Sema was selected as caretaker chair at a November 2020 meeting in Maguindanao, leading to Jakiri's son threatening to reject the chairmanship unless Sulu was given more executive representation in the MNLF.
