= Abdulraof Macacua government =

Current government in the Philippines

Abdulraof Macacua cabinet
- Cabinet of Bangsamoro
- Abdulraof Macacua
- Official portrait, 2026
- Date formed: October 30, 2026

People and organisations
- Wa'lī: Muslim Guiamaden
- Chief Minister: Abdulraof Macacua
- Member party: Bangsamoro Federalist Party
- Status in legislature: Hung
- Opposition party: UBJP

History
- Election: September 14, 2026
- Legislature term: 1st Parliament (2026–present)
- Predecessor: Macacua (interim)

The Bangsamoro Cabinet under Chief Minister Abdulraof Macacua is the first regular Bangsamoro regional government cabinet.

== Background ==
=== Interim government ===
Abdulraof Macacua was the second and last interim Chief Minister of Bangsamoro having been appointed to the position since March 12, 2025 by President Bongbong Marcos. His appointment by Marcos has been controversial and questioned within his group, the Moro Islamic Liberation Front (MILF) since its claimed that he was not the preferred person as regional chief executive.

Macacua has also been a member of the Bangsamoro Transition Authority since 2019 and the secretary general of the United Bangsamoro Justice Party (UBJP). In August 2026, Macacua formally defected to the Bangsamoro Federalist Party (BFP) and assumed presidency and chairmanship of the party.

His other rival for the role is Murad Ebrahim, another influential figure within the MILF, who was the first interim Chief Minister from 2019 to 2025.

=== 2026 Bangsamoro election ===
The first Bangsamoro Parliament election was held on September 14, 2026 which determined the composition of the first regular parliament. Macacua who ran under the Bangsamoro Federalist Party retained his seat after winning the seat for the 3rd parliamentary district of Maguindanao del Norte.

With no party winning 41 seats outright, the first election resulted in a hung parliament. The Bangsamoro Federalist Party (BFP) and the UBJP were the main parties. The BFP has claimed it had secured a majority of votes to elect a chief minister of its choosing. However the BARMM Grand Coalition clarified it has yet to enter a coalition agreement with any party.

=== Chief ministerial election ===
The first Bangsamoro Parliament convened on October 30, 2026 with 79 out of 80 members present. There were two candidates for the position of Chief Minister: Kitem Kadatuan nominated Abdulraof Macacua of the BFP while Mohagher Iqbal nominated Murad Ebrahim. Ishak Mastura served as the temporary presiding officer for the process of electing the chief minister.

Macacua won the election within the parliament, garnering 51 votes with his rival Ebrahim securing 27 votes. One member present abstain.

Macacua received four votes from the UBJP while seven of the eight-member BARMM Grand Coalition (BGC) also supported Macacua. A lone BGC vote went to Ebrahim.

Votes by candidate

| Member of parliament | | Votes for | Result |
| Name | Party | Votes for | Result |
|---|---|---|---|
| Abdulraof Macacua | BFP | 51 / 80 | Elected as chief minister |
| Murad Ebrahim | UBJP | 27 / 80 | Lost |
One abstention, one absent

== Composition ==
Macacua named members of his cabinet for the first regular government on November 5, 2026.

Cabinet Members
| Position | Minister | Took office | Left office |
|---|---|---|---|
| Senior Minister | MP Abunawas Maslamama | November 5, 2026 | —N/a |
| Cabinet Secretary | Abdullah Cusain | November 5, 2026 | —N/a |
| Bangsamoro Attorney-General's Office | Duque Kadatuan | November 5, 2026 | —N/a |
| Minister of Basic, Higher and Technical Education | MP Naguib Sinarimbo | November 5, 2026 | —N/a |
| Minister of Social Services and Development | Alirakim Munder | November 5, 2026 | —N/a |
| Minister of Health | MP Jimael Salam Salliman | November 5, 2026 | —N/a |
| Minister of Agriculture, Fisheries and Agrarian Reform | MP Ishak Mastura | November 5, 2026 | —N/a |
| Minister of the Interior and Local Government | Jordan Bayam | November 5, 2026 | —N/a |
| Minister of Public Order and Safety | Datu Jomar Midtimbang | November 5, 2026 | —N/a |
| Minister of Labor and Employment | MP Kitem Kadatuan Jr. | November 5, 2026 | —N/a |
| Minister of Trade, Investment, and Tourism | Faizal Padate | November 5, 2026 | —N/a |
| Minister of Indigenous Peoples' Affairs | MP Jo Genna Jover | November 5, 2026 | —N/a |
| Minister of Finance, Budget and Management | Ubaida Pacasem | 2022 (Note: Retention from the interim government.) | —N/a |
| Minister of Environment, Natural Resources, and Energy | MP Akmad Brahim | 2022 | —N/a |
| Minister of Science and Technology | MP Hanie Bud | November 5, 2026 | —N/a |
| Minister of Human Settlements and Development | MP Rashdi Adiong | November 5, 2026 | —N/a |
| Minister of Transportation and Communications | Termizie Masahud | August 8, 2025 | —N/a |
| Minister of Public Works | Basir Ibrahim | November 5, 2026 | —N/a |
