= Muslimin Sema =

Filipino politician

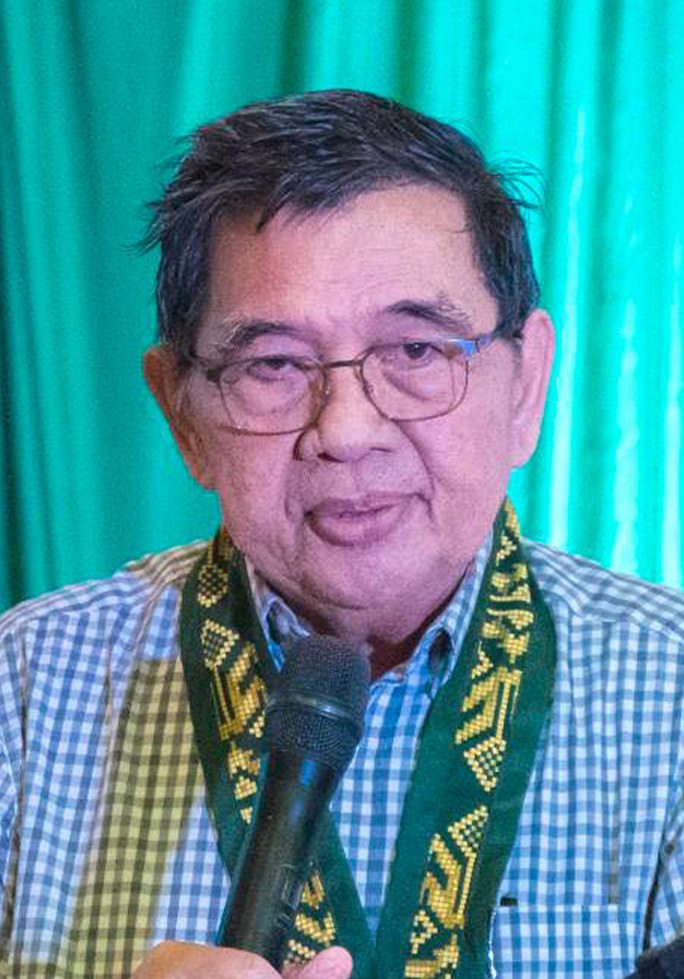

Bangsamoro Minister of Labor and Employment
- Incumbent
- Assumed office March 8, 2022
- Preceded by: Romeo Sema

Mayor of Cotabato City
- In office June 30, 1998 – June 30, 2010
- Succeeded by: Japal Guiani

Vice Mayor of Cotabato City
- In office June 30, 2010 – June 30, 2013
- Preceded by: Japal Guiani
- Succeeded by: Abdullah Andang

Personal details
- Born: April 27, 1949 (age 77) Cotabato City, Philippines
- Party: Nacionalista (2018–present); BAPA (2022–present)
- Other political affiliations: Liberal (2012–2018); NPC (2009–2012); Lakas-CMD (2007–2009)
- Education: National University
- Military career
- Allegiance: MNLF EC-15
- Service years: 1970s–present

Muslimin Gampong Sema (born April 27, 1949), also known as Mus Sema, is a Filipino politician who is the current minister of labor and employment of the Bangsamoro autonomous region, Philippines since March 8, 2022. He has also been the former mayor of Cotabato City and a member of the Moro National Liberation Front.

== Education ==
Sema finished his elementary grade at Sero Elementary School (1957-1963) in Cotabato and his secondary school years at Cotabato High School (1963-1967). In 1965, he was sent to Pennsylvania, United States as part of a summer student program.

He took up geodetic engineering at the National University from 1967 to 1970. In college, he started joining organizations where he could express his political views like the Philippine Muslim Nationalist League. He was one of the founding members of Moro National Liberation Front (MNLF).

== Career ==
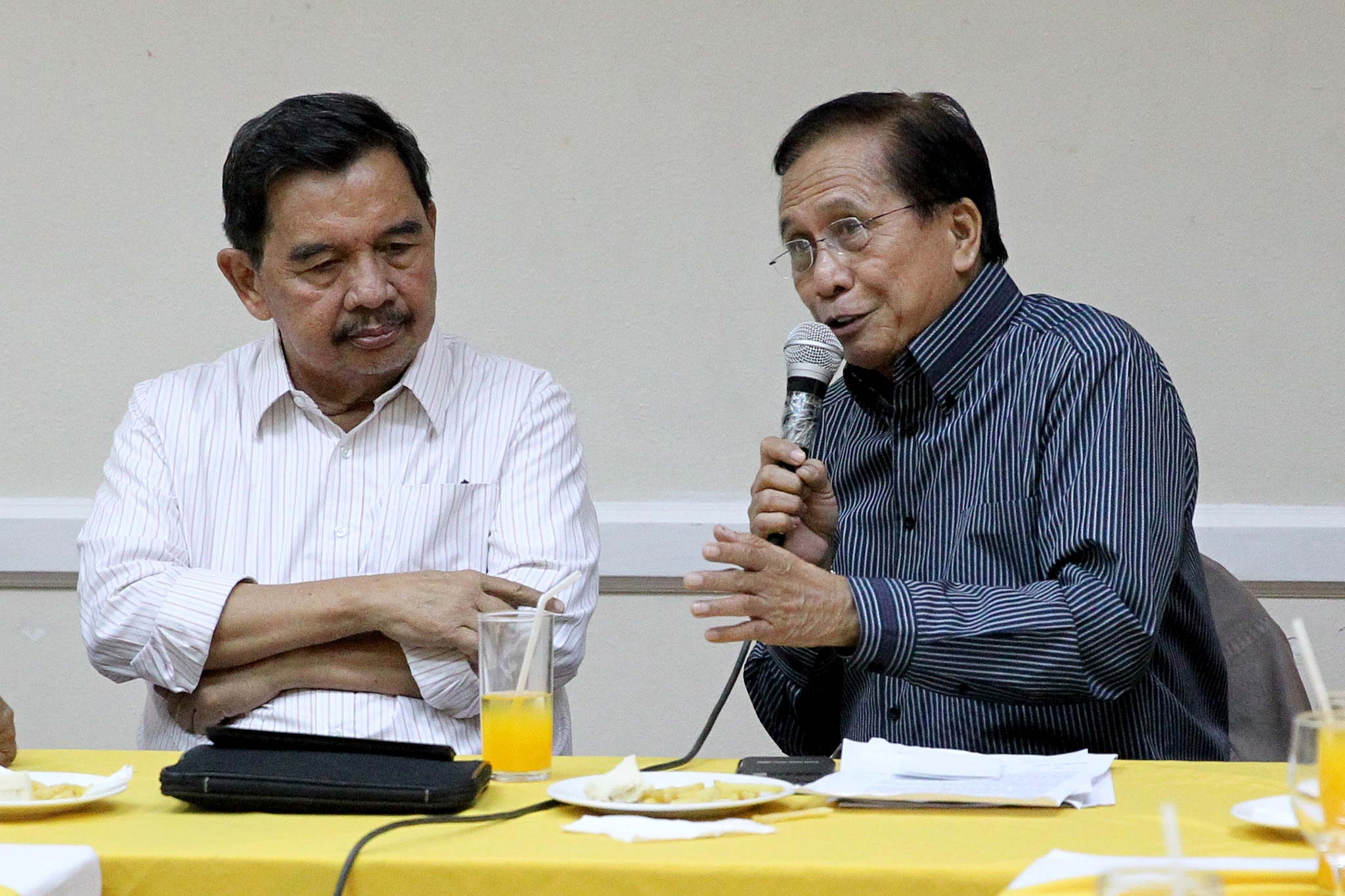
Sema (left) with Presidential Peace Adviser Jesus Dureza (right). 2016

In 1969, Sema worked as technical assistant of the Student's Affairs of the Commission on National Integration (CNI). From 1979 to 1989, he was the state chairman of the Utara Kutawato State Revolutionary Committee after which he became secretary general of the MNLF.

In 1996, he was appointed as the executive secretary of the Autonomous Region in Muslim Mindanao (ARMM). He attended numerous local and international conferences including the Pledging Session Conference in Paris, France and to the Technical Discussion Meeting of the Department of Finance-World Bank in Washington D.C., United States as a delegate representing the ARMM.

In February 1998, he became the executive director of the Southern Philippines Council for Peace and Development (SPCPD). In April 2001, he and some members of the MNLF formed the Executive Council of 15 which is currently led by him. He was elected as city mayor of Cotabato in 1998 and was re-elected in 2001, 2004 and during the May 2007 elections. In 2008, he was elected by the Central Committee of the MNLF as their new chairman. Sema served as vice mayor of Cotabato City and presiding officer of the Sangguniang Panlungsod from 2010 up to 2013. He lost to Japal Guiani while running for mayor in the 2013 and 2016 elections respectively both under the Liberal Party.

In 2017, Sema stepped down as MNLF chairman, and former Sulu governor Yusop Jikiri succeeded him as chairman.

In the 2019 elections, Sema under the Nacionalista banner made a failed bid to get elected as Maguindanao's 1st district representative losing to Roonie Sinsuat Sr.

Following Jikiri's death in 2020, Sema was re-elected as MNLF chairman.

The MNLF, under Sema, launched on January 8, 2022, the Bangsamoro Party (BAPA) – the group's own political party.

On March 8, 2022, Sema was appointed to head the Ministry of Labor and Employment of the Bangsamoro regional government under Chief Minister Murad Ebrahim, succeeding his nephew, Romeo.

== Personal life ==
Muslimin Sema has 12 children. He is married to Bai Sandra Sema, formerly the congressional representative for the First District of Maguindanao. Sema is also an ethnic Maguindanaon.
