= Bai Sandra Sema =

Filipino politician (born 1966)

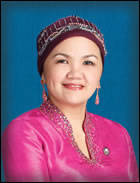
- Official portrait, 2013

Deputy Speaker of the House of Representatives of the Philippines
- In office August 17, 2016 – June 30, 2019
- Speaker: Pantaleon Alvarez; Gloria Macapagal Arroyo

Member of the Philippine House of Representatives for Maguindanao's 1st district
- In office June 30, 2010 – June 30, 2019
- Preceded by: Didagen Dilangalen
- Succeeded by: Roonie Sinsuat Sr.

Personal details
- Born: Sandra Sinsuat Ampatuan; June 4, 1966 (age 60)
- Party: BaPa (2025–present)
- Other political affiliations: UBJP (2022–2025); PDP–Laban (2016–2019); Liberal (2010–2016); Lakas (2010)
- Spouse: Muslimin Sema

Bai Sandra Sinsuat Ampatuan Sema (born June 4, 1966) is a Filipino politician who served as a member of the Philippine House of Representatives for Maguindanao's 1st congressional district from 2010 to 2019. Currently a member of the Bangsamoro Party, she previously served as House deputy speaker from 2016 to 2019.

After her congressional tenure, Sema ran for vice governor of Maguindanao in 2022, but lost to Ainee Sinsuat. She also lost her bids for Maguindanao del Norte's lone district in 2025, and for membership in the Bangsamoro Parliament in 2026.

Sema is the wife of Bangsamoro minister of labor and employment Muslimin Sema.

== Electoral history ==
Electoral history of Bai Sandra Sema
Year	Office	Party	Votes received				Result
Year	Office	Party	Total	%	P.	Swing	Result
2001	Vice Governor of ARMM	Independent	2,421	0.29%	8th	—N/a	Lost
2010	Representative (Maguindanao–1st)	Lakas	143,546	65.98%	1st	—N/a	Won
2013	Representative (Maguindanao–1st)	Liberal	—N/a	—N/a	1st	—N/a	Won
2016	Representative (Maguindanao–1st)	Liberal	—N/a	—N/a	1st	—N/a	Won
2022	Vice Governor of Maguindanao	UBJP	234,591	43.24%	2nd	—N/a	Lost
2025	Representative (Maguindanao del Norte)	UBJP	117,263	33.38%	2nd	—N/a	Lost
2026	Member of the Bangsamoro Parliament (Maguindanao del Norte–4th)	BaPa	35,603	40.68%	2nd	—N/a	Lost

House of Representatives of the Philippines
Preceded by Didagen Dilangalen	Member of the Philippine House of Representatives for Maguindanao's 1st district 2010–2019	Succeeded by Roonie Sinsuat Sr.
