= MNLF Executive Council of 15 =

Political faction in the Philippines

Moro National Liberation Front Executive Council of 15
- Seal
- Leader: Mus Sema
- Dates active: April 2001 – present (as a political organization)
- Country: Philippines
- Headquarters: Maguindanao, Philippines
- Active regions: Bangsamoro, Philippines
- Ideology: Moro autonomy; Egalitarianism
- Status: Active
- Wars: Moro conflict

The Moro National Liberation Front Executive Council of 15 (MNLF EC-15) is a faction of the Moro National Liberation Front (MNLF) in which the group of 15 leaders forged a unity agreement with the Moro Islamic Liberation Front (MILF). The agreement was signed in Kuala Lumpur and coincided with the Filipino President's visit. Muslimin Sema is the current chairman of the group. The government of the Philippines recognizes Sema along with Misuari as representatives of the MNLF despite the recognition of Nur Misuari as chairman by the Organisation of Islamic Cooperation, which the MNLF is an observer member to. Supposedly, Sema's group together with Habib Mudjahab Hashim's MNLF Islamic Command Council (ICC), somewhat agreed to reunite with the MNLF under Misuari.

== History ==
After the arrest of Nur Misuari in Malaysia due to the failed rebellion in 2001, some members of the MNLF formed the Executive Council of 15 currently led by Muslimin Sema. In April 2001, they voted to oust Misuari as leader of the MNLF led by former ARMM Governor Parouk Hussein. Some time later in 2008, Muslimin Sema has been elected as the chairman of the group. In 2017, former Sulu Governor Yusop Jikiri became the new chairman until his death in 2020. Due to his death, Sema has been re-elected back as the Chairman.

== Present ==
Currently, this faction supports the Bangsamoro Organic Law and currently allied with the Moro Islamic Liberation Front. As a result, some members have been appointed as members of the Bangsamoro Transition Authority by President Rodrigo Duterte. Notably, its members are Hatimil Hassan, Romeo Sema, Omar Yasser Sema, and Abdul Sahrin.

On May 27, 2021, amidst the ongoing deliberation on the Bangsamoro Transition Authority Extension Bill filed at the Senate, the Executive Council of 15 launched an indignation rally due to lack of representation within the proposed bill.

This faction also formed the Bangsamoro Party, the political party which will be used for future elections.

On August 12, 2022, members of the EC-15 got reappointed with additional new members by President Bongbong Marcos into the Bangsamoro Transition Authority.
