= Rolando Uy =

Filipino politician

16th Mayor of Cagayan de Oro
- Incumbent
- Assumed office June 30, 2022
- Vice Mayor: Jocelyn Rodriguez
- Preceded by: Oscar Moreno

Member of the Philippine House of Representatives from Cagayan de Oro's 1st district
- In office June 30, 2013 – June 30, 2022
- Preceded by: Jose Benjamin Benaldo
- Succeeded by: Lordan Suan
- In office June 30, 2007 – June 30, 2010
- Preceded by: District established
- Succeeded by: Jose Benjamin Benaldo

Barangay captain of Carmen, Cagayan de Oro
- In office November 2010 – 2013
- Preceded by: Lorna Uy
- Succeeded by: Lorna Uy
- In office May 1997 – November 2007

Personal details
- Born: Rolando Adlao Uy; July 5, 1954 (age 72) Bonifacio, Misamis Occidental, Philippines
- Party: PFP (2024-present)
- Other political affiliations: Nacionalista (2007-2010); Liberal (2010-2016); PDP-Laban (2016-2018); NUP (2018-2024)
- Spouse: Lorna Uy
- Education: University of San Jose–Recoletos (BS)
- Nickname: Klarex

Rolando "Klarex" Adlao Uy (born July 5, 1954) is a Filipino politician serving as the mayor of Cagayan de Oro since 2022. He was reelected in May 2025. He previously served as Representative of Cagayan de Oro's 1st district from 2007 to 2010 and from 2013 to 2022. He also unsuccessfully sought the mayoralty in 2010. Uy started his political career in Barangay Carmen, Cagayan de Oro serving as a barangay kagawad and two stints as the barangay captain.

== Early life and education ==
Uy was born on July 5, 1954, in Cagayan de Oro, Misamis Oriental. He earned a degree in Business and Finance from the University of San Jose–Recoletos in Cebu City in 1975.

== Political career ==
Uy entered politics as a barangay kagawad of Carmen in 1994. He later became barangay chairman in 1997 and served two terms. In 2007, he was elected as the representative of the 1st district of Cagayan de Oro as an independent candidate.

During his first term in Congress, he co-authored significant laws including the Cheaper Medicines Act of 2007 (RA 9502) and authored RA 9690, which reorganized the Cagayan de Oro Engineering District. From 2013 to 2022, Uy served additional congressional terms, co-authoring the Salary Standardization Law of 2019 (RA 11466) and the Corporate Recovery and Tax Incentives for Enterprises Act (RA 11534).

He first ran for mayor in 2010 but lost narrowly to then-Vice Mayor Vicente Emano. Uy returned to local politics in 2022 and won the mayoral election, defeating Pompee La Viña.

As mayor, Uy launched the Rise framework, Regionalization and Metropolization, Institutional Development, Security and Safety, and Economic Recovery and Sustainability, which guided the city’s post-pandemic development priorities. Under his administration, the city completed 233 infrastructure projects worth ₱1.24 billion between 2022 and early 2025, and expanded programs such as Klarex nga Serbisyo sa Baryo (service caravans to barangays).

In 2025, he started his second term as mayor, continuing programs such as People’s Day and the “Suruy-suruy sa Baryo” outreach initiative. His administration also implemented citywide waste management reforms after directing a task force to address garbage collection issues.

== Personal life ==
Uy is married to Lorna Uy, who has also served as barangay chairperson of Carmen. They had two sons: Ranier Joaquin Uy, a former vice mayor, and the late Roland Sherwin Uy, who was killed in 2021.

Preceded by Oscar Moreno	Mayor of Cagayan de Oro City; 2022–Present	Succeeded by Incumbent

Preceded by Benjo A. Benaldo	Representative, 1st District of Cagayan de Oro City; 2007–2010 2013–2022	Succeeded by Lordan Suan

Preceded by Lorna V. Uy	Barangay Captain of Carmen, Cagayan de Oro City; 1997–2007 2010–2013	Succeeded by Lorna V. Uy
