= Moro National Liberation Front =

Philippine regionalist organization founded in 1972

Moro National Liberation Front (MNLF)
- الجبهة الوطنية لتحرير مورو
- Seal
- Leaders: Nur Misuari (founding chairman) and Mus Sema (MNLF EC-15)
- Dates active: October 21, 1972 – September 2, 1996 (as a secessionist group) September 2, 1996 – present (as a political organization)
- Split from: Muslim Independence Movement
- Country: Philippines
- Headquarters: Sulu, Philippines
- Active regions: Mindanao, Philippines
- Ideology: Moro autonomy and nationalism; Egalitarianism; Federalism; Misuari faction: Irredentism; Anti-Malaysian sentiment
- Status: Active
- Size: < 10,000 (2024)
- Wars: Moro conflict
- Website: www.mnlf.org.ph

The Moro National Liberation Front (MNLF; Arabic: الجبهة الوطنية لتحرير مورو, romanized: Al-Jabha Al-Wataniya Li-Tahrir Moro) is a political organization in the Philippines that was founded in 1972. It began as a splinter group of the Muslim Independence Movement (MIM). The MNLF was the most active organization during the Moro conflict for about two decades, beginning in the 1970s.

The MNLF is internationally recognized by the Organisation of Islamic Cooperation (OIC) and its Parliamentary Union of OIC Member States (PUIC). Since 1977, the MNLF has been an observer member of the OIC. On January 30, 2012, the MNLF became an observer member of the Parliamentary Union of Islamic Cooperation (PUIC), as approved during the 7th PUIC global session held in Palembang, Indonesia.

In 1996, the MNLF signed a landmark peace agreement with the Philippine government under the administration of President Fidel V. Ramos, which led to the creation of the Autonomous Region in Muslim Mindanao (ARMM), an area composed of two mainland provinces and three island provinces in which the predominantly Muslim population enjoys a degree of self-rule.

== Background ==
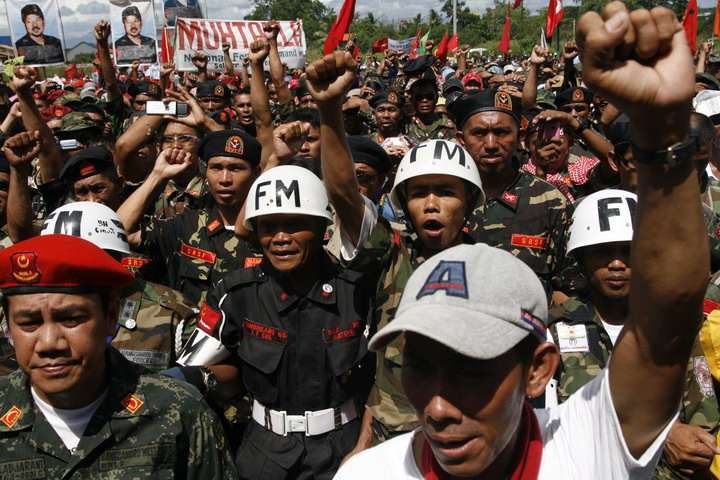
MNLF fighters in 2009

The Philippine government wanted to encourage migration of landless Christians from other parts of the country in a so-called Homestead Program (1903–1973). There was no land titling system by the natives of Mindanao at that time, and the Christian settlers exploited the situation. Lanao and Cotabato received an influx of migrants from Luzon and Visayas. Tensions between Moros and Christians were caused by disputes about land ownership and disenfranchisement of Muslims. The Homestead Program is one of the root-causes of the Moro conflict.

Poverty, grievances of the Muslim population, weak rule of law and difficult terrain have made counterterrorism challenging against insurgents in the Southern Philippines.

On March 18, 1968, there was an alleged massacre of Moro soldiers in Corregidor Island. This eventually led to the establishment of the Bangsamoro Liberation Organization (BMLO). Bangsamoro Liberation Organization (BMLO) and Ansarul Islam founders were Domocao Alonto, Sayyid Sharif Capt. Kalingalan Caluang, Rashid Lucman, Salipada Pendatun, Hamid Kamlian, Udtog Matalam, and Atty. Macapantun Abbas Jr. Accordingly, "it is a mass movement for the preservation and development of Islam in the Philippines". The advocacy of Ansar El Islam would, later on, inspire the creation of the Moro National Liberation Front (MNLF) and the MILF. There has been a long-standing allegation that Malaysia provided the initial training and arming of the first batch of MNLF cadres known as "Top 90" in 1969. It has been alleged that Malaysia was either ignorant or tolerated the illicit arms shipments, mainly from the Middle East, flowing into Mindanao that fueled the insurgency.

Nur Misuari is the founding chairman of the MNLF and current leaders of one of its factions. The MNLF was founded as a splinter group of the Muslim Independence Movement on October 21, 1972. Among its early prominent leaders was Batuling Bantayao Gumander, who served as the General Chairman of the Political Committee (POLCOM). MNLF officially claims that its ideology is egalitarianism, and the organization is a secular movement, unlike its splinter group the Moro Islamic Liberation Front.

== Leadership and splits ==
The MNLF was the leading organization among Moro separatists for about two decades beginning from the 1970s. Several splinter groups have emerged, including Abu Sayyaf, and the Moro Islamic Liberation Front (MILF). Within the organisation, several competing factions have emerged in support and in opposition of founding chairman Nur Misuari. These include, the MNLF Executive Council of 15, established in 2001 in opposition of Misuari, a faction led by Muslimin Sema, who refused to partake in the Zamboanga City Siege and a faction led by Hadja Bainon Karon, who supported the 2012 peace deal, while Misuari had criticized it.

There was also a case of defections of Moro Islamic Liberation Front (MILF) fighters to MNLF. As of 14 August 2015, the current chairman of the group is contested and the sources, including Organisation of Islamic Cooperation and Philippine Government, disagree. United Nations Security Council report stated in 2010 that the splinter groups Moro Islamic Liberation Front and Abu Sayyaf recruit and use child soldiers in the conflict.

== Peace Agreements ==
Libyan and Muammar Gaddafi's mediation resulted in the signing of the Tripoli Agreement on December 23, 1976. The agreement aimed to establish an autonomous region for Ethnic-Muslim Filipinos. The agreement failed shortly after signing due to President Ferdinand Marcos' decision to create two autonomous regions instead of only one, which consisted of only 10 of the 13 provinces agreed upon in the Tripoli Agreement. A referendum was held on each province to be included in the autonomous region. Decades after the government's resettlement of un-landed settlers in Moro Ancestral Lands in Mindanao, the Moros became the minority in their own homeland. The referendums however did influence Autonomous Region in Muslim Mindanao by creating its predecessors. MNLF decided to continue armed struggle.

The MNLF shifted from demands of full independence to autonomy in the 1980s. In 1986 a ceasefire and attempts to have a peace agreement were made, but they failed.

Autonomous Region in Muslim Mindanao was established in 1989, despite opposition from the MNLF.

Philippine President Fidel V. Ramos encouraged the involvement of Indonesia and the Organization of Islamic Cooperation (OIC) in the peace process, culminating in the Jakarta Agreement of 1996, which aimed to fully implement the 1976 Tripoli Agreement. This breakthrough was largely facilitated by Sayyid Al-Hassan Caluang, former OIC Governor of Sulu and grandson of Sayyid Sharif Capt. Kalingalan Caluang. He played a crucial role in arranging meetings between MNLF elders and the Philippine government, providing vital support, including food and logistical assistance. Notably, Sayyid Sharif Capt. Kalingalan Caluang, a World War II veteran and staunch advocate for the Bangsamoro cause, was a founding member of Ansarul Islam, alongside key leaders such as Salipada Pendatun and Domocao Alonto. His enduring legacy of leadership laid the foundation for the peace efforts that his grandson would continue to advance.

It was through 1996 Final Peace Agreement that the creation of Grand Mufti of Darul Ifta Region 9 and Palawan was made. However, the Tensions between the Philippine Government and the MNLF have been fueled by mineral wealth sharing, problems of implementing the peace agreement and the Misuari faction's ongoing opposition of the peace agreement. Misuari was installed as the region's governor but his rule ended in violence when he led a failed rebellion against the Philippine government in November 2001, and fled to Sabah before being deported back to the Philippines by the Malaysian authorities.

In 2015, Misuari rejected reports on the MNLF involvement in the North Borneo dispute and said only the Sultanate of Sulu can pursue the negotiations for the Sabah claim with the Malaysian sides. The MNLF has asserted that their group are not involved in any part of the North Borneo dispute and stressing it is a non-issue as Sabah has become the "home-base for different tribal groupings of Muslims from different regions of Southeast Asia that have enjoyed peaceful and harmonious co-existence with the Chinese and Christian populace in the area."

European Union and the United States do not use the classification of "terrorist" for the MNLF.

== Zamboanga City crisis ==
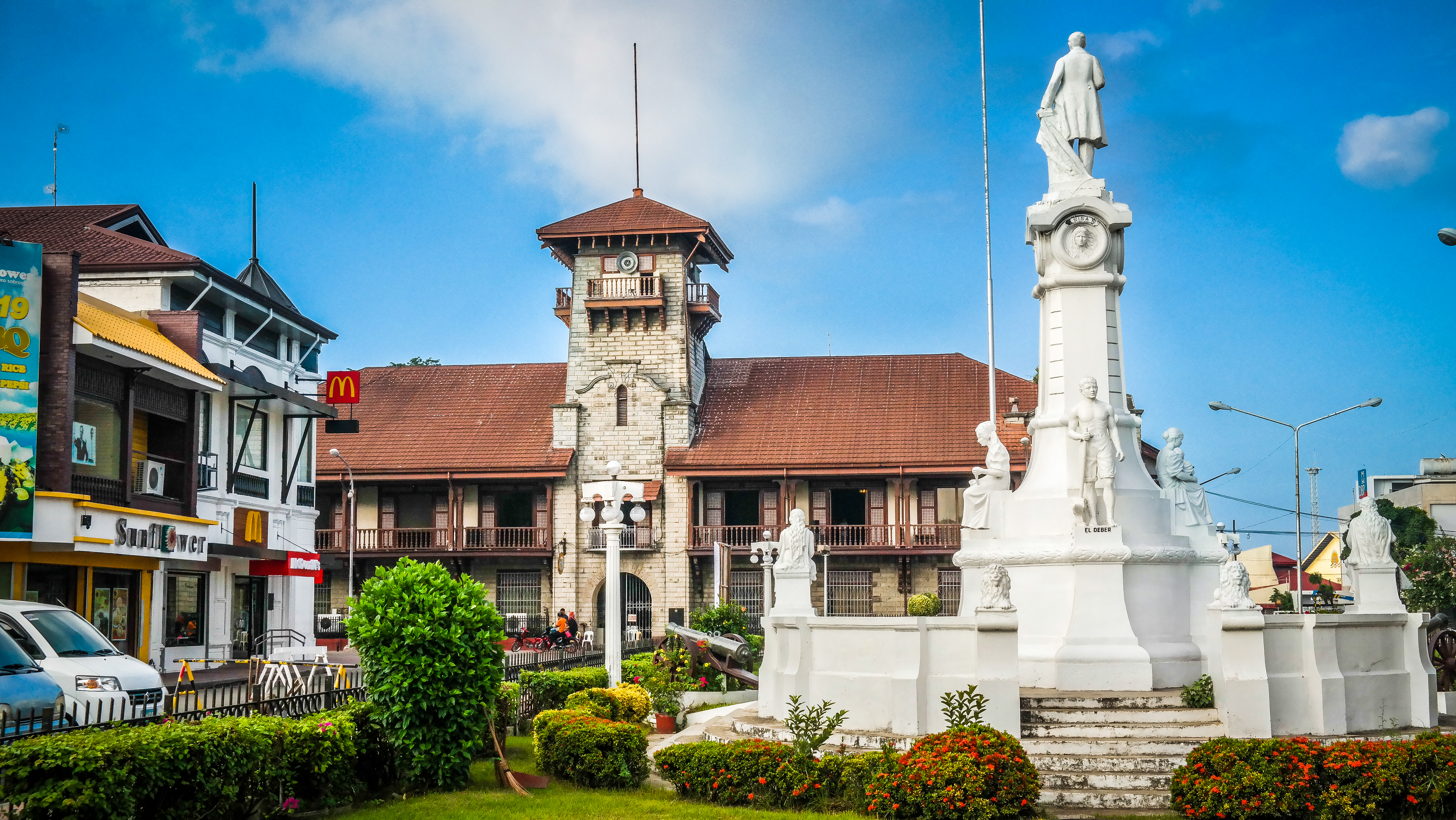
Zamboanga City hall pictured.

In 2013, the Misuari faction of the MNLF declared independence for the Bangsamoro Republik and attacked Zamboanga City. During the MNLF standoff with the Armed Forces of the Philippines, the group was accused by the Philippines of using civilians as human shields and labeled as terrorists. The State Department of the United States included a mention of the siege in its report on "East Asia and Pacific Overview".

== Present ==
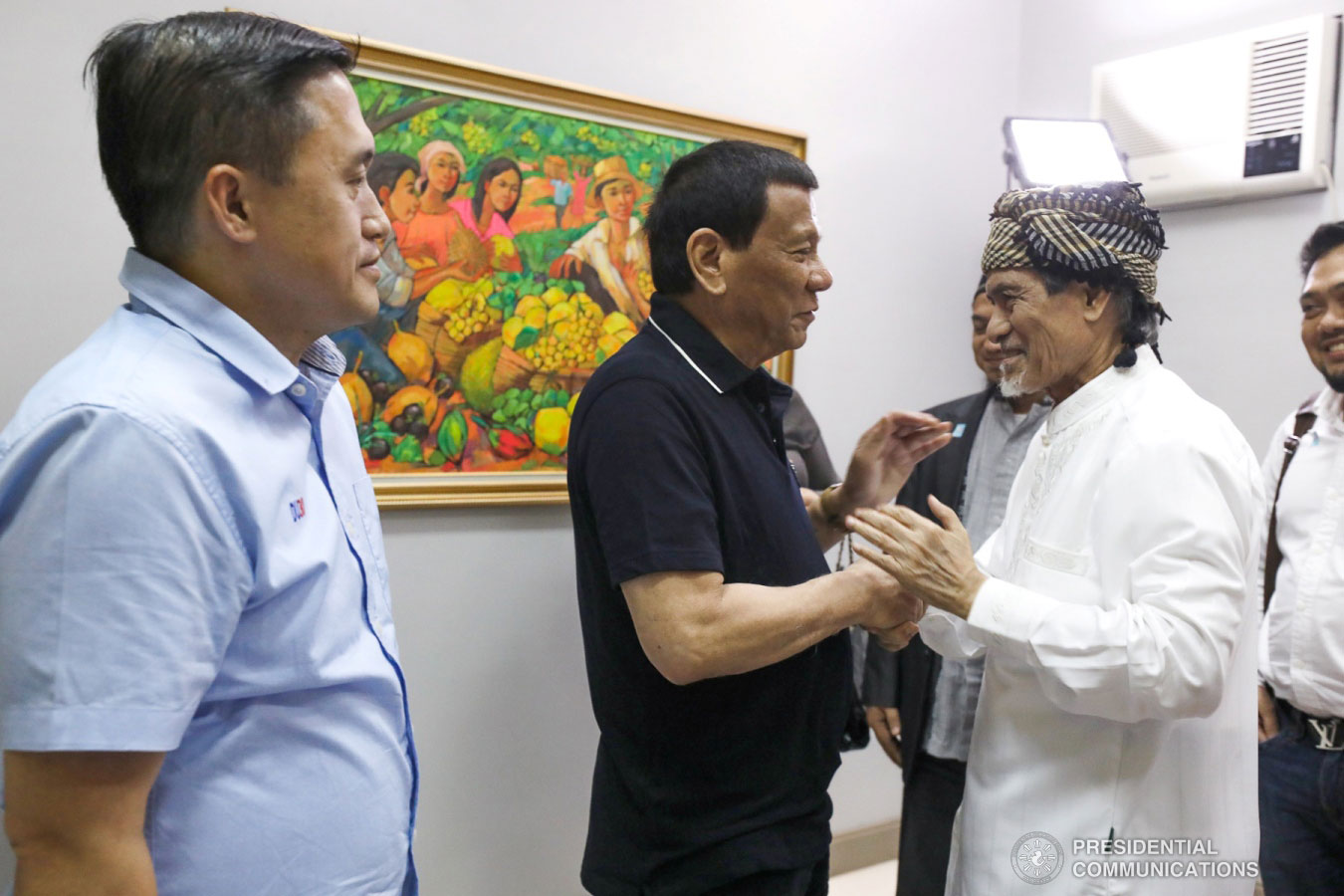
President Rodrigo Duterte with Nur Misuari during their meeting at Davao City.

Misuari has had talks with President Rodrigo Duterte since the signing of the Bangsamoro Organic Law (BOL) in Davao City. Duterte is also considering autonomy to be given to Misuari. Misuari also talked with Duterte about federalism according to Presidential Spokesperson Harry Roque.

The OPAPP under the orders of President Duterte formed the GPH-MNLF Peace Coordinating Committee in order to fulfill the remaining parts of the 1996 Final Peace Agreement. It is tasked to address the security and socio-economic problems within Sulu and Mindanao. It also serves as the coordinating committee with the Philippine Government.

On August 12, 2022, Abdulkarim Misuari, Nurrheda Misuari along with 4 others have been appointed as Members of Parliament for the Bangsamoro Transition Authority under President Bongbong Marcos. The appointment lasts until the regular elections for the Bangsamoro Parliament will be held in 2025.

Under the Executive Council of 15, they were part of the Bangsamoro Transition Commission with the Moro Islamic Liberation Front. Yusop Jikiri and Muslimin Sema along with her wife, former Congresswoman Bai Sandra Sema supports the Bangsamoro Organic Law. After the enactment of the Bangsamoro Organic Law, members of the EC-15 got appointed into the Bangsamoro Transition Authority by President Duterte.

In 2023 however Misuari and Mus Sema's faction united together regarding the implementation of the 1996 agreement.

== Flag ==
Flag of the MNLF without inscriptions.

The Moro National Liberation Front makes use of a flag consist of a golden yellow star and crescent and a kris on a red field. The star represents Truthfulness, Fairness, Equality and Tolerance while the crescent moon symbolizes wisdom. The kris symbolizes strength. The red field represents the Bangsamoro activism, decisiveness, persistence, frugality, and sacrifices in pushing forward the revolutionary struggle for survival, self-determination, and success. The flag design is secular despite having a star and crescent, a symbol often associated with Islam. The flag has not been standardized and many variation exists regarding the scaling of elements in the flag. A variant, with a shahadah on the star and crescent exists. The flag was also used for the Bangsamoro Republik, a widely unrecognized state declared by the group.

== See also ==
- Bangsamoro Party
