= Jose Benjamin Benaldo =

Filipino politician

Jose Benjamin "Benjo" Abrio Benaldo

Member of Philippine House of Representatives from Cagayan de Oro's 1st congressional district
- In office June 30, 2010 – June 30, 2013
- Preceded by: Rolando Uy
- Succeeded by: Rolando Uy

Personal details
- Born: June 20, 1970 (age 56) Manila, Philippines
- Party: Nacionalista (2009-present)
- Other political affiliations: PMP (until 2009)

Jose Benjamin "Benjo" Abrio Benaldo (born June 20, 1970) was a member of the Congress of the Philippines from 2010 until 2013.

He is the son of former DILG Assistant Secretary, Serafin Benaldo. Benaldo studied AB Economics in La Salle, and Law in Ateneo. Before becoming a congressman, Benaldo was a councilor in Cagayan de Oro.
