= 2010 Philippine gubernatorial elections =

- May 10, 2010

All 80 provincial governorships
| | First party | Second party | Third party |
|---|---|---|---|
| Party | Lakas–Kampi | Liberal | Nacionalista |
| Seats before | 50 (63%) | 10 (13%) | 8 (10%) |
| Seats after | 41 (52%) | 13 (16%) | 10 (13%) |
| Seat change | ▼9 | ▲3 | ▲2 |
| | Fourth party | Fifth party |
| Party | NPC | PMP |
| Seats before | 8 (10%) | 0 (0%) |
| Seats after | 9 (11%) | 2 (2%) |
| Seat change | ▲1 | ▲2 |
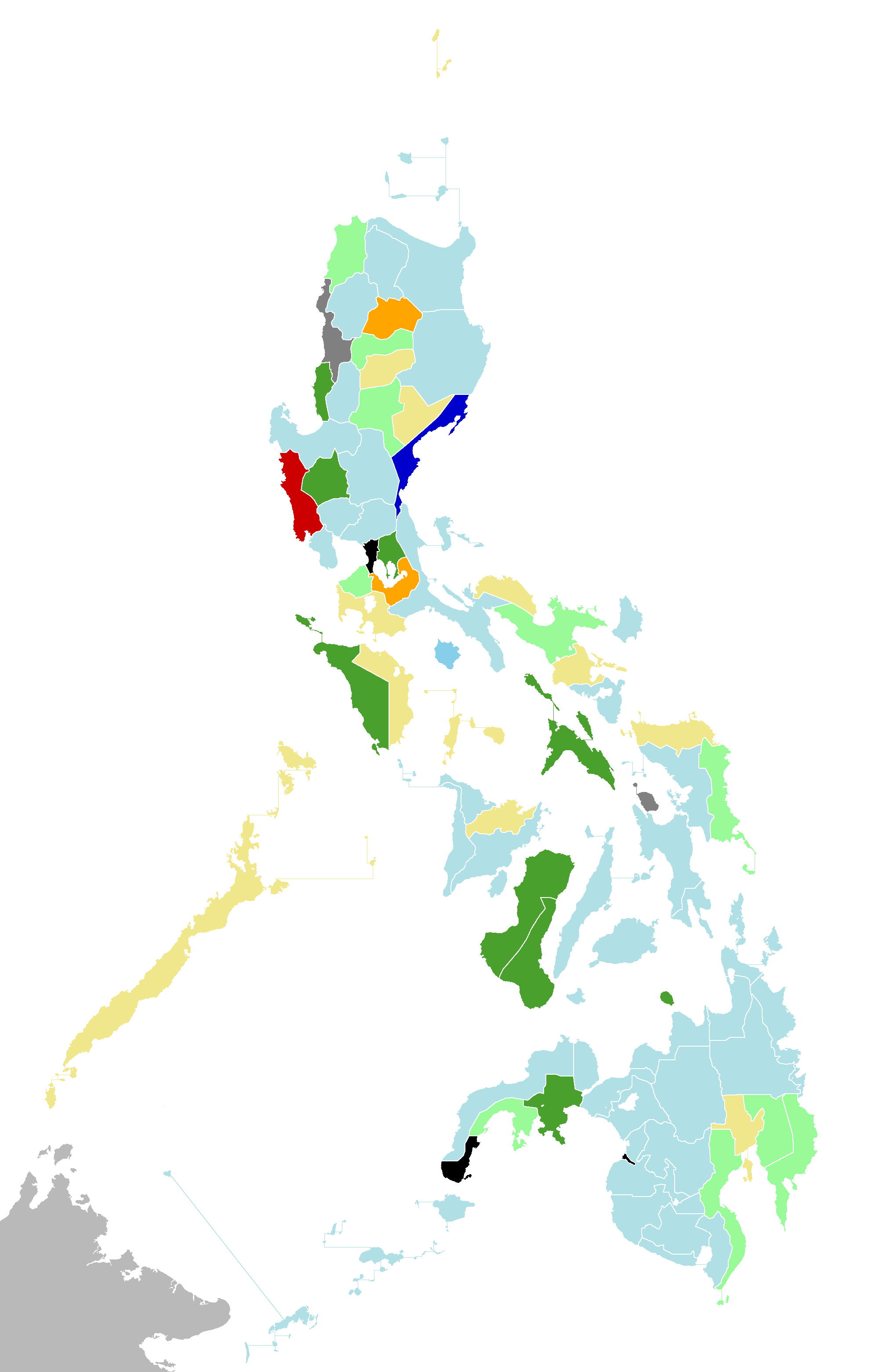
- Election results.

Gubernatorial elections were held in the Philippines on May 10, 2010. All provinces elected their governors for three-year terms that would begin on June 30, 2010. Governors who were serving their third consecutive term were prohibited from seeking re-election, but were eligible to run for any other position.

Highly urbanized cities and independent component cities such as Zamboanga City, Angeles City and Cebu City, and including Metro Manila and the municipality of Pateros are outside the jurisdiction of any province and thus won't elect for governors of their mother provinces (Pampanga and Cebu, for Angeles and Cebu City). They, along with Metro Manila would elect mayors instead.

== Background ==
Lakas-Kampi-CMD, the merged party of Lakas-CMD and KAMPI of President Gloria Macapagal-Arroyo, has a majority of the provincial governorships in the lead-up to the 2010 elections. The Liberal Party was a far second. However, with the resolution of pending disputed election results by the Commission on Elections (COMELEC), the Liberals lost three more governorships. Attracting international attention is the election race for governor of Maguindanao where Esmael Mangudadatu was competing after a rival clan kidnapped and murdered 57 people including his wife, sisters, aides, and lawyers, plus several journalists.

=== Bulacan ===
On December 1, 2009, the COMELEC's Second Division ruled that Roberto Pagdanganan defeated Jonjon Mendoza in the 2007 elections, with Pagdanganan garnering 342,295 votes, 4,231 votes over Mendoza. Mendoza was a member of KAMPI prior to switching to the Liberals, and Pagdanganan was a member of Lakas-CMD before joining the Nacionalista Party. Mendoza and Pagdanganan won't contest the governorship; Pagdanganan is running for Congress as representative of Bulacan's 1st district, while Mendoza is running as representative from Bulacan's 3rd district, while her sister, former governor Josefina Dela Cruz will run as her brother's replacement.

=== Isabela ===
In Isabela, Grace Padaca of the Liberal Party defeated Benjamin "Ben" Dy of the Nationalist People's Coalition (NPC) via a margin of 17,007 votes, with Padaca garnering 237,128 votes and Dy having 220,121 votes. Padaca was proclaimed winner on June 30, the day of inauguration of all local officials.

On December 8, 2009, the COMELEC Second Division ruled that Dy defeated Grace Padaca by a margin of 1,051 votes, with Dy garnering 199,435 over Padaca's 198,384. Padaca previously defeated Benjamin's brother Faustino Jr. in the 2004 election, ending the Dy's three-decade long rule in Isabela. This time, it's one of Ben's brothers, Faustino III also known as Bojie, who will contest Padaca in the 2010 gubernatorial election, with the ruling Lakas-Kampi-CMD party nominating him; while Ben on the other hand will vie for the mayorship of Cauayan instead.

=== Pampanga ===
Arroyo's home province of Pampanga had one of the most hotly contested gubernatorial elections in 2007, with three out of six candidates having a realistic chance of winning: then incumbent Mark Lapid (Lakas-CMD), board member Lilia Pineda (KAMPI) and Roman Catholic priest-on-leave Eddie Panlilio (Independent). Panlilio was proclaimed the winner, garnering 219,706 votes, with Pineda obtaining 218,559 and Lapid having 210,875 votes.

Pineda contested the result; meanwhile, Panlilio became a member of the Liberal Party late in 2009, supporting Noynoy Aquino's presidential campaign. On early February 2010, the COMELEC's Second Division ruled that Pineda won the 2007 election, obtaining 190,729 votes against Panlilio's 188,718.

== Luzon ==
=== Ilocos Region ===
==== Ilocos Norte ====
Ilocos Norte gubernatorial election
| Party | Candidate | Votes | % |
|---|---|---|---|
| Nacionalista | Imee Marcos | 196,160 | 69.34 |
| Lakas–Kampi | Michael Marcos Keon (incumbent) | 86,005 | 30.40 |
| Independent | Lucinda Flores | 741 | 0.26 |
| Total votes | | 282,906 | 100.00 |
| Nacionalista gain from Lakas–Kampi | | | |

==== Ilocos Sur ====
Ilocos Sur (Note: Incumbent governor Deogracias Victor Savellano is running for vice governor.) gubernatorial election
| Party | Candidate | Votes | % |
|---|---|---|---|
| Independent | Chavit Singson (Note: Chavit Singson resigned from Lakas-Kampi-CMD but did not join another party. Singson endorsed Manny Villar, but has not joined Villar's Nacionalista Party.) | 199,215 | 64.91 |
| PMP | Rambo Rafanan | 107,712 | 35.09 |
| Total votes | | 306,927 | 100.00 |
| Independent hold | | | |

==== La Union ====
La Union gubernatorial election
| Party | Candidate | Votes | % |
|---|---|---|---|
| NPC | Manuel Ortega (incumbent) | 250,821 | 74.42 |
| Lakas–Kampi | Tomas Dumpit | 86,198 | 25.58 |
| Total votes | | 337,019 | 100.00 |
| NPC hold | | | |

==== Pangasinan ====
Pangasinan gubernatorial election
| Party | Candidate | Votes | % |
|---|---|---|---|
| Lakas–Kampi | Amado Espino Jr. (incumbent) | 833,441 | 72.91 |
| Liberal | Victor Agbayani | 301,049 | 26.33 |
| Independent | Wilfredo Sison | 6,041 | 0.53 |
| PGRP | Wilfredo Velasco | 2,672 | 0.23 |
| Total votes | | 1,143,203 | 100.00 |
| Lakas–Kampi hold | | | |

=== Cagayan Valley ===
==== Batanes ====
Batanes gubernatorial election
| Party | Candidate | Votes | % |
|---|---|---|---|
| Liberal | Vicente Gato | 3,413 | 41.51 |
| Lakas–Kampi | Telesforo Castillejos (incumbent) | 2,466 | 29.99 |
| Nacionalista | Willy Agsunod | 2,343 | 28.50 |
| Total votes | | 8,222 | 100.00 |
| Liberal gain from Lakas–Kampi | | | |

==== Cagayan ====
Cagayan gubernatorial election
| Party | Candidate | Votes | % |
|---|---|---|---|
| Lakas–Kampi | Alvaro Antonio (incumbent) | 248,446 | 57.99 |
| Liberal | Manuel Mamba | 176,921 | 41.29 |
| Independent | Joven de los Santos | 3,095 | 0.72 |
| Total votes | | 465,752 | 100.00 |
| Lakas–Kampi hold | | | |

==== Isabela ====
Isabela gubernatorial election
| Party | Candidate | Votes | % |
|---|---|---|---|
| Lakas–Kampi | Faustino Dy III | 274,757 | 50.09 |
| Liberal | Grace Padaca (incumbent) | 271,319 | 49.47 |
| Independent | Lilia Uy | 2,408 | 0.44 |
| Total votes | | 548,484 | 100.00 |
| Lakas–Kampi gain from Liberal | | | |

==== Nueva Vizcaya ====
Nueva Vizcaya gubernatorial election
| Party | Candidate | Votes | % |
|---|---|---|---|
| Nacionalista | Luisa Cuaresma (incumbent) | 108,182 | 65.97 |
| Liberal | Florante Gerdan | 55,078 | 33.59 |
| Independent | Editha Taylan | 721 | 0.44 |
| Total votes | | 175,118 | 100.00 |
| Nacionalista hold | | | |

==== Quirino ====
Quirino (Note: Incumbent governor Dakila Cua is running for congressman. His father, incumbent representative Junie Cua, is running in his place.) gubernatorial election
| Party | Candidate | Votes | % |
|---|---|---|---|
| Liberal | Junie Cua | 62,802 | 83.11 |
| Nacionalista | Pedro Bacani | 11,621 | 15.38 |
| Independent | Dante Valencia | 1,143 | 1.51 |
| Total votes | | 78,025 | 100.00 |
| Liberal hold | | | |

=== Cordillera Administrative Region ===
==== Abra ====
Abra gubernatorial election
| Party | Candidate | Votes | % |
|---|---|---|---|
| Lakas–Kampi | Eustaquio Bersamin (incumbent) | 89,985 | 95.57 |
| Independent | Lizardo Ambobia | 4,172 | 4.43 |
| Total votes | | 119,651 | 100.00 |
| Lakas–Kampi hold | | | |

==== Apayao ====
Apayao gubernatorial election
| Party | Candidate | Votes | % |
|---|---|---|---|
| Lakas–Kampi | Elias Bulut Jr. | 38,421 | 90.83 |
| KBL | Ambaro Sagle | 3,504 | 8.28 |
| Independent | Tito Salleb | 377 | 0.89 |
| Total votes | | 47,362 | 100.00 |
| Lakas–Kampi hold | | | |

==== Benguet ====
Benguet gubernatorial election
| Party | Candidate | Votes | % |
|---|---|---|---|
| Lakas–Kampi | Nestor Fongwan (incumbent) | 87,618 | 59.05 |
| Independent | Samuel Dangwa | 40,563 | 27.34 |
| NPC | Raul Molintas | 20,189 | 13.61 |
| Total votes | | 154,549 | 100.00 |
| Lakas–Kampi hold | | | |

==== Ifugao ====
Ifugao (Note: Incumbent governor Teddy Baguilat is running for congressman.) gubernatorial election
| Party | Candidate | Votes | % |
|---|---|---|---|
| Liberal | Eugene Balitang | 40,080 | 52.74 |
| Lakas–Kampi | Solomon Chungalao | 35,389 | 46.56 |
| Independent | Manuel Dangayo | 532 | 0.70 |
| Total votes | | 79,954 | 100.00 |
| Liberal hold | | | |

==== Kalinga ====
Kalinga gubernatorial election
| Party | Candidate | Votes | % |
|---|---|---|---|
| PMP | Jocel Baac | 30,731 | 33.15 |
| NPC | Marciano Dugiang | 28,150 | 30.36 |
| Lakas–Kampi | Floydelia Diasen (incumbent) | 19,602 | 21.14 |
| Liberal | Conrado Dieza | 9,235 | 9.96 |
| Independent | Dante Langkit | 4,992 | 5.38 |
| Total votes | | 97,599 | 100.00 |
| PMP gain from Lakas–Kampi | | | |

==== Mountain Province ====
Mountain Province (Note: Incumbent governor Maximo Dalog is term-limited and is running for congressman.) gubernatorial election
| Party | Candidate | Votes | % |
|---|---|---|---|
| Nacionalista | Leonard Mayaen | 22,310 | 32.03 |
| LM | Marcial Lawilao, Jr. | 17,488 | 25.11 |
| LDP | Ezra Gomez | 16,860 | 24.21 |
| NPC | Harry Dominguez | 6,610 | 9.49 |
| Liberal | Louis Claver, Jr. | 6,610 | 9.49 |
| Independent | Albert Padayos | 135 | 0.19 |
| Total votes | | 74,791 | 100.00 |
| Nacionalista gain from Lakas–Kampi | | | |

=== Central Luzon ===
==== Aurora ====
Aurora gubernatorial election
| Party | Candidate | Votes | % |
|---|---|---|---|
| LDP | Bellaflor Angara-Castillo (incumbent) | 46,678 | 57.11 |
| Nacionalista | Mariano Tangson | 31,652 | 38.73 |
| PDP–Laban | Ruben dela Cruz | 3,398 | 4.16 |
| Total votes | | 85,746 | 100.00 |
| LDP hold | | | |

==== Bataan ====
Bataan gubernatorial election
| Party | Candidate | Votes | % |
|---|---|---|---|
| Lakas–Kampi | Enrique Garcia (incumbent) | 212,808 | 61.40 |
| NPC | Nelson David | 133,780 | 38.60 |
| Total votes | | 364,851 | 100.00 |
| Lakas–Kampi hold | | | |

==== Bulacan ====
Bulacan (Note: Incumbent governor Jonjon Mendoza is running for congressman. His sister, former governor Josefina Dela Cruz is running in his place.) gubernatorial election
| Party | Candidate | Votes | % |
|---|---|---|---|
| Lakas–Kampi | Wilhelmino Sy-Alvarado | 533,527 | 51.21 |
| Liberal | Josefina Dela Cruz | 492,468 | 47.27 |
| PGRP | Miguel Esguerra | 11,212 | 1.08 |
| Independent | Santos Caperlac | 4,711 | 0.45 |
| Total votes | | 1,158,982 | 100.00 |
| Lakas–Kampi gain from Liberal | | | |

==== Nueva Ecija ====
Nueva Ecija gubernatorial election
| Party | Candidate | Votes | % |
|---|---|---|---|
| Lakas–Kampi | Aurelio Umali (incumbent) | 517,852 | 61.72 |
| BALANE | Edward Thomas Joson | 315,641 | 37.62 |
| PGRP | Felino Pajarillo, Jr. | 5,532 | 0.66 |
| Total votes | | 906,791 | 100.00 |
| Lakas–Kampi hold | | | |

==== Pampanga ====
Pampanga gubernatorial election
| Party | Candidate | Votes | % |
|---|---|---|---|
| Lakas–Kampi | Lilia Pineda | 488,521 | 65.98 |
| Liberal | Eddie Panlilio (incumbent) | 242,367 | 32.74 |
| Independent | Ricardo Ocampo, Sr. | 9,479 | 1.28 |
| Total votes | | 802,667 | 100.00 |
| Lakas–Kampi gain from Liberal | | | |

==== Tarlac ====
Tarlac gubernatorial election
| Party | Candidate | Votes | % |
|---|---|---|---|
| NPC | Victor Yap (incumbent) | 396,069 | 81.02 |
| Lakas–Kampi | Marcelino Guiang Aganon, Jr. | 81,695 | 16.71 |
| Independent | Mario Bagtas | 5,689 | 1.16 |
| Independent | Ernesto Calma | 2,993 | 0.61 |
| PGRP | Salvador David Santos | 2,429 | 0.50 |
| Total votes | | 542,070 | 100.00 |
| NPC hold | | | |

==== Zambales ====
Zambales gubernatorial election
| Party | Candidate | Votes | % |
|---|---|---|---|
| LM | Hermogenes Ebdane | 125,202 | 55.62 |
| Liberal | Amor Deloso (incumbent) | 96,112 | 42.69 |
| Ang Kapatiran | Hilary Pangan | 3,088 | 1.37 |
| Independent | Myrna Español | 715 | 0.32 |
| Total votes | | 237,765 | 100.00 |
| LM gain from Liberal | | | |

=== Calabarzon ===
==== Batangas ====
Batangas gubernatorial election
| Party | Candidate | Votes | % |
|---|---|---|---|
| Liberal | Vilma Santos-Recto (incumbent) | 603,159 | 59.63 |
| Nacionalista | Edna Sanchez (Note: Candidate and former governor Armando Sanchez died on April 27, 2010. His wife, Santo Tomas, Batangas mayor Edna Sanchez became his replacement.) | 393,586 | 38.91 |
| Independent | Marcos Mandanas, Sr. | 13,007 | 1.29 |
| Independent | Gaudioso Platero | 1,760 | 0.17 |
| Total votes | | 1,071,219 | 100.00 |
| Liberal hold | | | |

==== Cavite ====
Cavite (Note: Incumbent governor Ayong Maliksi is term-limited and is running for congressman.) gubernatorial election
| Party | Candidate | Votes | % |
|---|---|---|---|
| Nacionalista | Juanito Victor Remulla | 467,323 | 46.47 |
| Liberal | Dencito Campaña | 419,134 | 41.68 |
| PMP | Melencio De Sagun, Jr. | 107,977 | 10.74 |
| KBL | Angelita Tagle | 4,514 | 0.45 |
| Independent | Bonifacio Ber Ado | 4,189 | 0.42 |
| Independent | Ma. Gloria Mahilum | 2,472 | 0.25 |
| Total votes | | 1,111,862 | 100.00 |
| Nacionalista gain from Liberal | | | |

==== Laguna ====
Laguna (Note: Incumbent governor Teresita S. Lazaro is term-limited. Her son, provincial administrator Dennis Lazaro, is running in her place.) gubernatorial election
| Party | Candidate | Votes | % |
|---|---|---|---|
| PMP | Emilio Ramon Ejercito | 334,530 | 34.88 |
| Lakas–Kampi | Dennis Lazaro | 260,440 | 27.16 |
| Liberal | Joey Lina | 234,473 | 24.45 |
| Nacionalista | Ramil Hernandez | 123,670 | 12.89 |
| Independent | Christine Amador | 3,634 | 0.38 |
| Independent | Randy Bautista | 2,311 | 0.24 |
| Total votes | | 1,050,890 | 100.00 |
| PMP gain from Lakas–Kampi | | | |

==== Quezon ====
Quezon gubernatorial election
| Party | Candidate | Votes | % |
|---|---|---|---|
| Lakas–Kampi | David Suarez | 397,858 | 53.84 |
| Liberal | Rafael Nantes (incumbent)† | 333,292 | 45.11 |
| Independent | Rolando Rafa | 2,532 | 0.34 |
| Independent | Hobart Dator | 2,459 | 0.33 |
| PGRP | Eduardo Cuenca | 1,218 | 0.16 |
| Independent | Buenaventura Pumarega | 853 | 0.12 |
| Independent | Gleceria Sta. Maria | 695 | 0.09 |
| Total votes | | 795,534 | 100.00 |
| Lakas–Kampi gain from Liberal | | | |

==== Rizal ====
Rizal gubernatorial election
| Party | Candidate | Votes | % |
|---|---|---|---|
| NPC | Casimiro Ynares III (incumbent) | 575,296 | 73.05 |
| Aksyon | Pedro Cuerpo | 190,532 | 24.19 |
| Independent | Rosita Lacson | 10,843 | 1.38 |
| KBL | Wilfredo Torres | 5,050 | 0.64 |
| Independent | Anicio Escosura | 2,012 | 0.26 |
| Independent | Rex Darwin Tiongson | 1,965 | 0.25 |
| Independent | Milagros Tumimbang | 1,884 | 0.24 |
| Total votes | | 861,613 | 1000 |
| NPC hold | | | |

=== Mimaropa ===
==== Marinduque ====
Marinduque gubernatorial election
| Party | Candidate | Votes | % |
|---|---|---|---|
| Bigkis | Carmencita Reyes (Note: Guest candidate of the Liberal Party.) | 40,639 | 41.54 |
| Lakas–Kampi | Jose Antonio Carrion (incumbent) | 28,548 | 29.18 |
| Independent | Wilfredo Red | 27,799 | 28.41 |
| Independent | Narciso Daquioag | 849 | 0.87 |
| Total votes | | 97,835 | 100.00 |
| Bigkis gain from Lakas–Kampi | | | |

==== Occidental Mindoro ====
Occidental Mindoro gubernatorial election
| Party | Candidate | Votes | % |
|---|---|---|---|
| NPC | Josephine Ramirez-Sato (incumbent) | 109,366 | 68.15 |
| Lakas–Kampi | Ronilo Omanio | 49,021 | 30.55 |
| PGRP | Regalado Dimayacyac | 2,084 | 1.30 |
| Total votes | | 172,313 | 100.00 |
| NPC hold | | | |

==== Oriental Mindoro ====
Oriental Mindoro gubernatorial election
| Party | Candidate | Votes | % |
|---|---|---|---|
| Liberal | Alfonso Umali, Jr. | 149,658 | 50.02 |
| Lakas–Kampi | Arnan Panaligan (incumbent) | 149,537 | 49.98 |
| Total votes | | 320,466 | 100.00 |
| Liberal gain from Lakas–Kampi | | | |

==== Palawan ====
Palawan (Note: Incumbent governor Mario Joel T. Reyes is term limited and is running for congressman.) gubernatorial election
| Party | Candidate | Votes | % |
|---|---|---|---|
| Liberal | Abraham Mitra | 146,847 | 52.05 |
| PPPL | Jose Alvarez | 131,872 | 46.74 |
| Independent | Richard Lopez | 1,956 | 0.69 |
| PGRP | Lezenie Tomori | 770 | 0.27 |
| Independent | Mardonio Gamos | 685 | 0.24 |
| Total votes | | 301,711 | 100.00 |
| Liberal gain from PPPL | | | |

==== Romblon ====
Romblon gubernatorial election
| Party | Candidate | Votes | % |
|---|---|---|---|
| Liberal | Eduardo Firmalo | 63,368 | 52.04 |
| Nacionalista | Natalio Beltran, III (incumbent) | 55,382 | 45.48 |
| Independent | Telesforo Gaan | 3,013 | 2.47 |
| Total votes | | 132,239 | 100.00 |
| Liberal gain from Nacionalista | | | |

=== Bicol Region ===
==== Albay ====
Albay gubernatorial election
| Party | Candidate | Votes | % |
|---|---|---|---|
| Liberal | Joey Salceda (incumbent) | 466,605 | 95.30 |
| KKK | Maria Linda Montayre | 17,638 | 3.60 |
| PGRP | Marcelino Gallardo | 5,397 | 1.10 |
| Total votes | | 571,885 | 100.00 |
| Liberal hold | | | |

==== Camarines Norte ====
Camarines Norte (Note: Incumbent governor Jesus Typoco, Jr is term limited and is running for mayor of Daet, Camarines Norte.) gubernatorial election
| Party | Candidate | Votes | % |
|---|---|---|---|
| Liberal | Edgar Tallado | 66,784 | 34.09 |
| Lakas–Kampi | Winifredo Oco | 66,617 | 34.00 |
| PMP | Casimiro Padilla, Jr. | 62,523 | 31.91 |
| Total votes | | 195,924 | 100 |
| Liberal gain from Lakas–Kampi | | | |

==== Camarines Sur ====
Camarines Sur gubernatorial election
| Party | Candidate | Votes | % |
|---|---|---|---|
| Nacionalista | Luis Raymund Villafuerte (incumbent) | 400,690 | 67.71 |
| Lakas–Kampi | Felix Alfelor, Jr. | 191,066 | 32.29 |
| Total votes | | 653,964 | 100.00 |
| Nacionalista hold | | | |

==== Catanduanes ====
Catanduanes gubernatorial election
| Party | Candidate | Votes | % |
|---|---|---|---|
| Lakas–Kampi | Joseph Cua (incumbent) | 71,813 | 60.93 |
| NPC | Joseph Santiago | 44,212 | 37.51 |
| KBL | Salvador Gianan | 1,071 | 0.91 |
| PGRP | Manuel Montarde | 764 | 0.65 |
| Total votes | | 130,366 | 100.00 |
| Lakas–Kampi hold | | | |

==== Masbate ====
Masbate gubernatorial election
| Party | Candidate | Votes | % |
|---|---|---|---|
| NPC | Rizalina Seachon-Lanete | 162,251 | 52.69 |
| Lakas–Kampi | Elisa Olga Kho (incumbent) | 139,712 | 45.37 |
| Independent | Judith Espinosa | 5,962 | 1.94 |
| Total votes | | 348,929 | 100.00 |
| NPC gain from Lakas–Kampi | | | |

==== Sorsogon ====
Sorsogon (Note: Incumbent governor Sally Ante-Lee filed her candidacy but later withdrew. Her husband, former governor Raul Lee, is running in her place) gubernatorial election
| Party | Candidate | Votes | % |
|---|---|---|---|
| Lakas–Kampi | Raul Lee | 160,251 | 59.69 |
| KAMPI | Jose Solis | 60,830 | 22.66 |
| Aksyon | Ramon Gallinera | 38,035 | 14.17 |
| PGRP | Amadeo Brin | 3,350 | 1.25 |
| Independent | Antonio Imperial, Jr. | 3,096 | 1.15 |
| Independent | Felizardo Garin | 2,926 | 1.09 |
| Total votes | | 323,191 | 100.00 |
| Lakas–Kampi hold | | | |

== Visayas ==
=== Western Visayas ===
==== Aklan ====
Aklan gubernatorial election
| Party | Candidate | Votes | % |
|---|---|---|---|
| Lakas–Kampi | Carlito Marquez (incumbent) | 166,099 | 78.30 |
| LM | Leovigildo Mationg | 40,895 | 19.28 |
| Independent | Anthony Acevedo | 5,140 | 2.42 |
| Total votes | | 246,002 | 100.00 |
| Lakas–Kampi hold | | | |

==== Antique ====
Antique (Note: Incumbent governor Salvacion Z. Perez is term limited and is running for congresswoman.) gubernatorial election
| Party | Candidate | Votes | % |
|---|---|---|---|
| Lakas–Kampi | Exequiel Javier | 111,642 | 56.48 |
| PMP | Rhodora Cadiao | 82,045 | 41.50 |
| Bangon Pilipinas | Jose Angcor, Jr. | 3,993 | 2.02 |
| Total votes | | 234,591 | 100.00 |
| Lakas–Kampi gain from NPC | | | |

==== Capiz ====
Capiz gubernatorial election
| Party | Candidate | Votes | % |
|---|---|---|---|
| Liberal | Victor Tanco (incumbent) | 189,501 | 60.54 |
| Ugyon Kita Capiz | Jocelyn Bolante | 121,176 | 38.71 |
| Independent | Zenon Amoroso | 2,329 | 0.74 |
| Total votes | | 343,977 | 100.00 |
| Liberal hold | | | |

==== Guimaras ====
Guimaras gubernatorial election
| Party | Candidate | Votes | % |
|---|---|---|---|
| Lakas–Kampi | Felipe Hilan Nava (incumbent) | 56,766 | 80.81 |
| PMP | Gerry Yucon | 13,482 | 19.19 |
| Total votes | | 76,690 | 100.00 |
| Lakas–Kampi hold | | | |

==== Iloilo ====
Iloilo (Note: Incumbent governor Neil Tupas, Sr. is term limited and is running for congressman. His son, incumbent Barotac Viejo mayor Raul Tupas, is running in his place) gubernatorial election
| Party | Candidate | Votes | % |
|---|---|---|---|
| Lakas–Kampi | Arthur Defensor | 353,017 | 49.92 |
| Liberal | Raul Tupas | 329,676 | 46.62 |
| Independent | Josil Jaen | 12,135 | 1.72 |
| Independent | Serapio Camposano | 7,126 | 1.01 |
| Independent | Nolbert Gil | 5,239 | 0.74 |
| Total votes | | 804,086 | 100.00 |
| Lakas–Kampi gain from Liberal | | | |

==== Negros Occidental ====
Negros Occidental (Note: Incumbent governor Isidro Zayco is running for Mayor of Kabankalan City.) gubernatorial election
| Party | Candidate | Votes | % |
|---|---|---|---|
| NPC | Alfredo Marañon | 485,610 | 58.58 |
| ATUN | Rafael Coscolluela | 343,389 | 41.42 |
| Total votes | | 991,422 | 100.00 |
| NPC gain from Lakas–Kampi | | | |

=== Central Visayas ===
==== Bohol ====
Bohol (Note: Incumbent governor Erico B. Aumentado is term limited and is running for congressman.) gubernatorial election
| Party | Candidate | Votes | % |
|---|---|---|---|
| Lakas–Kampi | Edgardo Chatto | 218,560 | 40.64 |
| Nacionalista | Julius Caesar Herrera | 162,510 | 30.22 |
| Liberal | Cesar Montano | 149,771 | 27.85 |
| PGRP | Eunice Cabillo-Campo | 5,304 | 0.99 |
| Independent | Jetur Ramada | 1,585 | 0.29 |
| Total votes | | 610,494 | 100.00 |
| Lakas–Kampi hold | | | |

==== Cebu ====
Cebu gubernatorial election
| Party | Candidate | Votes | % |
|---|---|---|---|
| Lakas–Kampi | Gwendolyn Garcia (incumbent) | 639,587 | 53.50 |
| Liberal | Hilario Davide III | 543,246 | 45.44 |
| PGRP | Godofredo Berizo | 7,757 | 0.65 |
| Independent | Rafael Ajoc | 4,806 | 0.40 |
| Total votes | | 1,365,975 | 100.00 |
| Lakas–Kampi hold | | | |

==== Negros Oriental ====
Negros Oriental gubernatorial election (Note: Incumbent governor Emilio Macias died on June 12, 2010. The winning vice governor, Dumaguete mayor Agustin Perdices became the governor of the province.)
| Party | Candidate | Votes | % |
|---|---|---|---|
| NPC | Emilio Macias (incumbent) | 237,816 | 51.98 |
| Nacionalista | Jose Baldado | 211,235 | 46.17 |
| Independent | Desiderio Mariano | 5,174 | 1.13 |
| Independent | Samuel Torres | 3,276 | 0.72 |
| Total votes | | 553,875 | 100.00 |
| NPC hold | | | |

==== Siquijor ====
Siquijor gubernatorial election
| Party | Candidate | Votes | % |
|---|---|---|---|
| Lakas–Kampi | Orlando Fua, Jr. (incumbent) | 40,491 | 83.34 |
| Liberal | Ben Aquino | 8,092 | 16.66 |
| Total votes | | 52,863 | 100.00 |
| Lakas–Kampi hold | | | |

=== Eastern Visayas ===
==== Biliran ====
Biliran (Note: Incumbent governor Rogelio Espina is term limited and is running for congressman. His brother, former congressman, Gerardo Espina Jr., is running in his place) gubernatorial election
| Party | Candidate | Votes | % |
|---|---|---|---|
| Nacionalista | Gerardo Espina Jr. | 32,211 | 42.35 |
| Lakas–Kampi | Charles Chong | 31,106 | 40.90 |
| Liberal | Ralph Salazar | 7,005 | 9.21 |
| Independent | Carlos Chan | 5,256 | 6.91 |
| Independent | Edgardo Ambe | 480 | 0.63 |
| Total votes | | 82,127 | 100.00 |
| Nacionalista hold | | | |

==== Eastern Samar ====
Eastern Samar (Note: Incumbent governor Ben Evardone is running for congressman.) gubernatorial election
| Party | Candidate | Votes | % |
|---|---|---|---|
| Nacionalista | Conrado Nicart, Jr. | 48,186 | 26.14 |
| Lakas–Kampi | Generoso Yu | 42,121 | 22.85 |
| Liberal | Efren Docena | 31,755 | 17.23 |
| NPC | Allan Contado | 23,602 | 12.81 |
| PMP | Leander Geli | 21,838 | 11.85 |
| LM | Jose Ramirez | 16,024 | 8.69 |
| PGRP | Joanes Alfredo Hobayan | 792 | 0.43 |
| Total votes | | 213,739 | 100.00 |
| Nacionalista gain from Lakas–Kampi | | | |

==== Leyte ====
Leyte gubernatorial election
| Party | Candidate | Votes | % |
|---|---|---|---|
| Lakas–Kampi | Jericho Petilla (incumbent) | 445,104 | 100.00 |
| Total votes | | 672,385 | 100.00 |
| Lakas–Kampi hold | | | |

==== Northern Samar ====
Northern Samar (Note: Incumbent governor Raul Daza is term limited and is running for congressman. His son, incumbent congressman Paul Daza, is running in his place.) gubernatorial election
| Party | Candidate | Votes | % |
|---|---|---|---|
| Liberal | Paul Daza | 138,287 | 57.63 |
| Lakas–Kampi | Harlin Abayon | 100,214 | 41.77 |
| Independent | Cesar Liguidliguid | 850 | 0.35 |
| Independent | Wenceslao Pancho, Jr. | 589 | 0.25 |
| Total votes | | 271,120 | 100.00 |
| Liberal hold | | | |

==== Samar ====
Samar (Note: Incumbent governor Milagrosa Tan is term limited and is running for congresswoman. Her daughter, incumbent congresswoman Sharee Ann Tan, is running in her place.) gubernatorial election
| Party | Candidate | Votes | % |
|---|---|---|---|
| Lakas–Kampi | Sharee Ann Tan | 126,430 | 43.07 |
| PDSP | Casilda Lim | 86,081 | 29.32 |
| NPC | Jesus Redaja | 74,881 | 25.51 |
| Bangon Pilipinas | Pedro Labid | 4,437 | 1.51 |
| Independent | Pilar Bolok | 1,735 | 0.59 |
| Total votes | | 346,987 | 100.00 |
| Lakas–Kampi hold | | | |

==== Southern Leyte ====
Southern Leyte gubernatorial election
| Party | Candidate | Votes | % |
|---|---|---|---|
| Lakas–Kampi | Damian Mercado (incumbent) | 132,696 | 73.18 |
| NPC | Marissa Lerias | 47,430 | 26.16 |
| Independent | Jerome Roden | 1,190 | 0.66 |
| Total votes | | 206,558 | 100.00 |
| Lakas–Kampi hold | | | |

== Mindanao ==
=== Zamboanga Peninsula ===
==== Zamboanga del Norte ====
Zamboanga del Norte gubernatorial election
| Party | Candidate | Votes | % |
|---|---|---|---|
| Lakas–Kampi | Rolando Yebes (incumbent) | 216,004 | 57.00 |
| Liberal | Isagani Amatong | 148,192 | 39.11 |
| PDSP | Carlito Feras | 9,354 | 2.47 |
| Independent | Franklin Ubay | 3,134 | 0.83 |
| Independent | Bernardo Arboiz, Jr. | 1,303 | 0.34 |
| Independent | Rogelio Gumanas | 936 | 0.25 |
| Total votes | | 432,494 | 100.00 |
| Lakas–Kampi hold | | | |

==== Zamboanga del Sur ====
Zamboanga del Sur (Note: Incumbent governor Aurora Cerilles is term limited and is running for congresswoman. Her husband, incumbent congressman and former DENR secretary Antonio Cerilles, is running in her place.) gubernatorial election
| Party | Candidate | Votes | % |
|---|---|---|---|
| NPC | Antonio Cerilles | 248,689 | 66.46 |
| Liberal | Roseller Ariosa | 125,481 | 33.54 |
| Total votes | | 400,759 | 100.00 |
| NPC hold | | | |

==== Zamboanga Sibugay ====
Zamboanga Sibugay (Note: Incumbent governor George Hofer is term limited and is running for mayor of Ipil, Zamboanga Sibugay. His daughter, congresswoman Dulce Ann Hofer, is running in his place.) gubernatorial election
| Party | Candidate | Votes | % |
|---|---|---|---|
| Nacionalista | Rommel Jalosjos | 121,441 | 52.92 |
| Lakas–Kampi | Dulce Ann Hofer | 107,276 | 46.75 |
| Independent | Lodrito Sabaiton | 763 | 0.33 |
| Total votes | | 242,795 | 100.00 |
| Nacionalista gain from Lakas–Kampi | | | |

=== Northern Mindanao ===
==== Bukidnon ====
Bukidnon (Note: Incumbent governor Jose Maria R. Zubiri, Jr. is term limited and is running for vice governor.) gubernatorial election
| Party | Candidate | Votes | % |
|---|---|---|---|
| Lakas–Kampi | Alex Calingasan | 237,279 | 54.22 |
| Nacionalista | Diosdado Tabios | 119,399 | 27.28 |
| Liberal | Ernesto Tabios | 60,923 | 13.92 |
| Independent | Romeo Zuce | 15,608 | 3.57 |
| Independent | Delfina Bicatulo | 4,450 | 1.02 |
| Total votes | | 550,098 | 100.00 |
| Lakas–Kampi gain from Nacionalista | | | |

==== Camiguin ====
Camiguin gubernatorial election
| Party | Candidate | Votes | % |
|---|---|---|---|
| NPC | Jurdin Jesus Romualdo (incumbent) | 34,540 | 75.89 |
| Liberal | Rogelio Gallardo | 10,974 | 24.11 |
| Total votes | | 46,830 | 100.00 |
| NPC hold | | | |

==== Lanao del Norte ====
Lanao del Norte gubernatorial election
| Party | Candidate | Votes | % |
|---|---|---|---|
| Lakas–Kampi | Mohamad Khalid Dimaporo (incumbent) | 205,267 | 87.15 |
| Liberal | Alijandro Batalo | 18,259 | 7.75 |
| Independent | Amer Moner, Sr. | 7,459 | 3.17 |
| Independent | Michael Siangco | 3,151 | 1.34 |
| Independent | Zamvitory Dimaampao | 1,402 | 0.60 |
| Total votes | | 268,141 | 100.00 |
| Lakas–Kampi hold | | | |

==== Misamis Occidental ====
Misamis Occidental (Note: Incumbent governor Loreto Leo S. Ocampos is term limited and is running for congressman.) gubernatorial election
| Party | Candidate | Votes | % |
|---|---|---|---|
| Lakas–Kampi | Herminia Ramiro | 128,130 | 51.93 |
| Nacionalista | Francisco Paylaga | 100,698 | 40.81 |
| Liberal | Carlos Bernad | 17,263 | 7.00 |
| PMP | Carlo Zafra | 649 | 0.26 |
| Total votes | | 272,211 | 100.00 |
| Lakas–Kampi gain from Liberal | | | |

==== Misamis Oriental ====
Misamis Oriental gubernatorial election
| Party | Candidate | Votes | % |
|---|---|---|---|
| Lakas–Kampi | Oscar Moreno (incumbent) | 253,536 | 73.80 |
| PMP | Michael Paderanga | 88,243 | 25.69 |
| Independent | Manuel Po | 1,750 | 0.51 |
| Total votes | | 397,355 | 100.00 |
| Lakas–Kampi hold | | | |

=== Davao Region ===
==== Compostela Valley ====
Compostela Valley gubernatorial election
| Party | Candidate | Votes | % |
|---|---|---|---|
| Nacionalista | Arturo Uy (incumbent) | 206,920 | 100.00 |
| Total votes | | 263,635 | 100.00 |
| Nacionalista hold | | | |

==== Davao del Norte ====
Davao del Norte gubernatorial election
| Party | Candidate | Votes | % |
|---|---|---|---|
| Liberal | Rodolfo del Rosario (incumbent) | 296,453 | 100.00 |
| Total votes | | 358,428 | 100.00 |
| Liberal hold | | | |

==== Davao del Sur ====
Davao del Sur gubernatorial election
| Party | Candidate | Votes | % |
|---|---|---|---|
| Nacionalista | Douglas Cagas (incumbent) | 163,440 | 48.19 |
| NPC | Claude Bautista | 159,527 | 47.04 |
| PMP | Alex Wangkay | 11,601 | 3.42 |
| Independent | Dominador Carrillo | 3,733 | 1.10 |
| Independent | Rosemarie Villamor | 826 | 0.24 |
| Total votes | | 363,927 | 100.00 |
| Nacionalista hold | | | |

==== Davao Oriental ====
Davao Oriental gubernatorial election
| Party | Candidate | Votes | % |
|---|---|---|---|
| Nacionalista | Corazon Malanyaon (incumbent) | 181,726 | 96.52 |
| PMP | Ruben Feliciano | 6,549 | 3.48 |
| Total votes | | 210,421 | 100.00 |
| Nacionalista hold | | | |

=== Soccsksargen ===
==== Cotabato ====
Cotabato (Note: Incumbent governor Jesus Sacdalan is running for congressman.) gubernatorial election
| Party | Candidate | Votes | % |
|---|---|---|---|
| Lakas–Kampi | Emmylou Taliño-Mendoza | 236,966 | 54.03 |
| Liberal | Emmanuel Piñol | 199,332 | 45.45 |
| PGRP | Kier Labog | 1,447 | 0.33 |
| Independent | Sucre Romancap | 869 | 0.20 |
| Total votes | | 458,882 | 100.00 |
| Lakas–Kampi hold | | | |

==== Sarangani ====
Sarangani gubernatorial election
| Party | Candidate | Votes | % |
|---|---|---|---|
| SARRO | Miguel Rene Dominguez (incumbent) | 89,668 | 51.28 |
| PCM | Juan Domino | 85,196 | 48.72 |
| Total votes | | 185,450 | 100.00 |
| SARRO hold | | | |

==== South Cotabato ====
South Cotabato (Note: Incumbent governor Daisy Avance-Fuentes is term limited and is running for congresswoman.) gubernatorial election
| Party | Candidate | Votes | % |
|---|---|---|---|
| Lakas–Kampi | Arthur Pingoy, Jr. | 120,021 | 39.67 |
| NPC | Ferdinand Hernandez | 107,870 | 35.65 |
| PMP | Fernando Miguel | 74,687 | 24.68 |
| Total votes | | 316,865 | 100.00 |
| Lakas–Kampi gain from NPC | | | |

==== Sultan Kudarat ====
Sultan Kudarat gubernatorial election
| Party | Candidate | Votes | % |
|---|---|---|---|
| Lakas–Kampi | Suharto Mangudadatu (incumbent) | 141,727 | 62.12 |
| NPC | Carlos Valdez, Jr. | 82,049 | 35.96 |
| Independent | Rodolfo Estorque | 2,219 | 0.97 |
| Independent | Ephraim Defiño | 2,152 | 0.94 |
| Total votes | | 247,741 | 100.00 |
| Lakas–Kampi hold | | | |

=== Caraga ===
==== Agusan del Norte ====
Agusan del Norte gubernatorial election
| Party | Candidate | Votes | % |
|---|---|---|---|
| Lakas–Kampi | Erlpe John Amante (incumbent) | 113,010 | 80.50 |
| Independent | Roger Patanao | 27,370 | 19.50 |
| Total votes | | 160,050 | 100.00 |
| Lakas–Kampi hold | | | |

==== Agusan del Sur ====
Agusan del Sur (Note: Incumbent governor Maria Valentina Plaza is running for congresswoman. Her brother, former governor Eddiebong Plaza, is running in her place.) gubernatorial election
| Party | Candidate | Votes | % |
|---|---|---|---|
| Lakas–Kampi | Eddiebong Plaza | 150,754 | 67.49 |
| Liberal | Isoceles Otero | 70,893 | 31.74 |
| Independent | Dominador Miolata | 1,723 | 0.77 |
| Total votes | | 253,477 | 100.00 |
| Lakas–Kampi hold | | | |

==== Dinagat Islands ====
Dinagat Islands (Note: Incumbent governor Jade Ecleo is running for vice-governor. Her mother, incumbent congresswoman Glenda Ecleo, is running in her place.) gubernatorial election
| Party | Candidate | Votes | % |
|---|---|---|---|
| Lakas–Kampi | Glenda Ecleo | 33,895 | 87.08 |
| Liberal | Harry Meso | 5,029 | 12.92 |
| Total votes | | 48,292 | 100.00 |
| Lakas–Kampi gain from Independent | | | |

==== Surigao del Norte ====
Surigao del Norte gubernatorial election
| Party | Candidate | Votes | % |
|---|---|---|---|
| Lakas–Kampi | Sol Matugas | 111,225 | 50.29 |
| Nacionalista | Ace Barbers (incumbent) | 109,011 | 49.29 |
| Independent | Ruperto Deguiño | 910 | 0.41 |
| Total votes | | 234,522 | 100.00 |
| Lakas–Kampi gain from Nacionalista | | | |

==== Surigao del Sur ====
Surigao del Sur (Note: Incumbent governor Vicente Pimentel Jr. is term limited. His brother, Johnny Pimentel, is running in his place.) gubernatorial election
| Party | Candidate | Votes | % |
|---|---|---|---|
| Lakas–Kampi | Johnny Pimentel | 156,168 | 70.39 |
| Independent | Percito Lozada | 58,341 | 26.29 |
| Independent | Anecito Lozada | 4,971 | 2.24 |
| Independent | Artemio Maquiso | 2,396 | 1.08 |
| Total votes | | 261,917 | 100.00 |
| Lakas–Kampi hold | | | |

=== Autonomous Region in Muslim Mindanao ===
==== Basilan ====
Basilan gubernatorial election
| Party | Candidate | Votes | % |
|---|---|---|---|
| Lakas–Kampi | Jum Akbar (incumbent) | 69,350 | 46.18 |
| Liberal | Mujiv Hataman | 60,408 | 40.23 |
| Nacionalista | Joel Maturan | 18,084 | 12.04 |
| NPC | Abdalun Awilun | 1,172 | 0.78 |
| Independent | Eddie Edris | 885 | 0.59 |
| Independent | Fauzul Juhur | 274 | 0.18 |
| Total votes | | 160,051 | 100.00 |
| Lakas–Kampi hold | | | |

==== Lanao del Sur ====
Lanao del Sur gubernatorial election
| Party | Candidate | Votes | % |
|---|---|---|---|
| Lakas–Kampi | Mamintal Alonto Adiong Jr. (incumbent) | 160,181 | 70.27 |
| Liberal | Omar Ali | 63,063 | 27.67 |
| Independent | Abohamadmahmod Abdullah | 2,243 | 0.98 |
| PMP | Bashier Manalao | 1,119 | 0.49 |
| LM | Jiamil Dianalan | 617 | 0.27 |
| Independent | Ahmadjam Abdulcarim | 399 | 0.18 |
| Independent | Muhammadomar Malawad | 326 | 0.14 |
| Total votes | | 227,948 | 100.0 |
| Lakas–Kampi hold | | | |

==== Maguindanao ====
Maguindanao (Note: Nariman Ambolodto serves as officer-in-charge governor of the province after the arrest of incumbent governor Andal Ampatuan, Sr. for the Maguindanao massacre and is not running.) gubernatorial election
| Party | Candidate | Votes | % |
|---|---|---|---|
| Lakas–Kampi | Esmael Mangudadatu | 153,706 | 42.31 |
| Bagumbayan | Ombra Sinsuat | 141,001 | 38.81 |
| PMP | Midpantao Midtimbang | 68,586 | 18.88 |
| Total votes | | 384,106 | 100.00 |
| Lakas–Kampi gain from Nonpartisan | | | |

==== Sulu ====
Sulu gubernatorial election
| Party | Candidate | Votes | % |
|---|---|---|---|
| Lakas–Kampi | Abdusakur Mahail Tan (incumbent) | 110,715 | 50.78 |
| NPC | Munir Arbison | 86,405 | 39.63 |
| Bangon Pilipinas | Nur Misuari | 19,625 | 9.00 |
| Independent | Sahiron Salim | 937 | 0.43 |
| Independent | Kadra Masihul | 232 | 0.11 |
| Independent | Idjal Alawi | 89 | 0.04 |
| Independent | Nadia Alih | 35 | 0.02 |
| Total votes | | 228,941 | 100.00 |
| Lakas–Kampi hold | | | |

==== Tawi-Tawi ====
Tawi-Tawi gubernatorial election
| Party | Candidate | Votes | % |
|---|---|---|---|
| Lakas–Kampi | Sadikul Sahali (incumbent) | 59,417 | 51.21 |
| NPC | Rashidin Matba | 56,013 | 48.28 |
| PMP | Abdurajad Juaini | 332 | 0.29 |
| Independent | Bagani Idanan | 253 | 0.22 |
| Total votes | | 120,190 | 100.00 |
| Lakas–Kampi hold | | | |
