= Jomar (given name) =

Jomar is a male given name. Notable people with the name include:

- Jomar Herculano Lourenço (born 1992), Brazilian footballer
- Jomar Brun (1904–1993), Norwegian chemical engineer
- Jomar Malangkit Maturan, Filipino politician
