= Ungkaya Pukan =

Municipality in Basilan, Philippines

Ungkaya Pukan اوڠكاي ڤوكن
- Municipality
- Municipality of Ungkaya Pukan
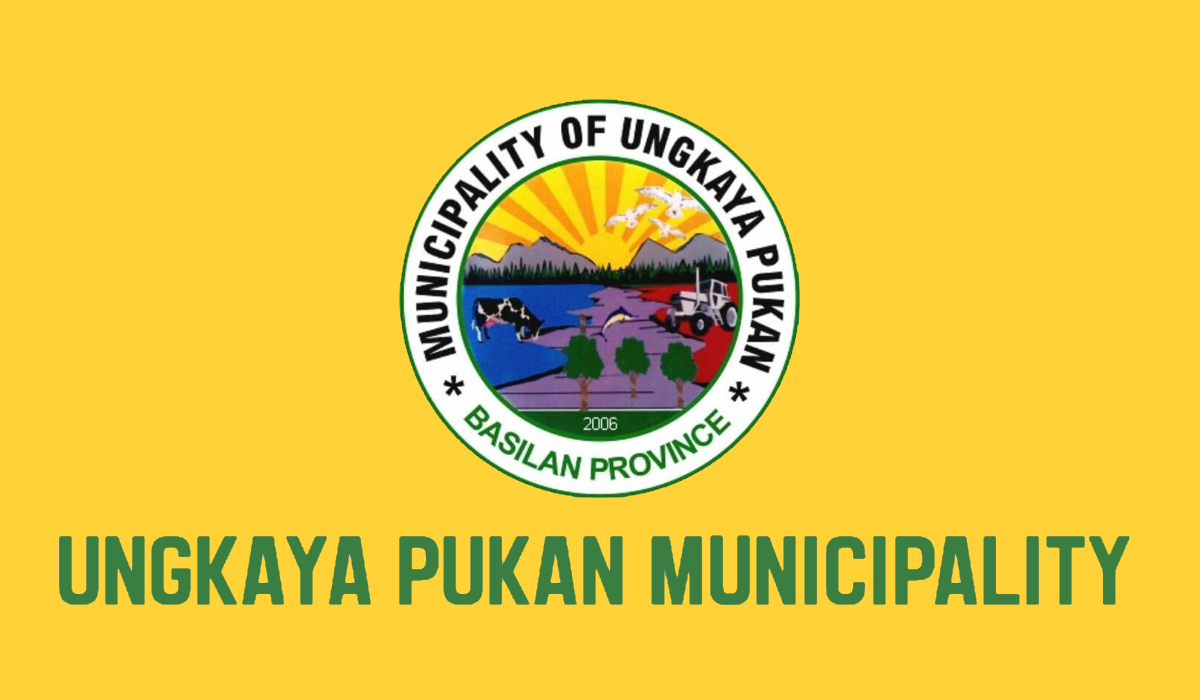
- Flag Seal

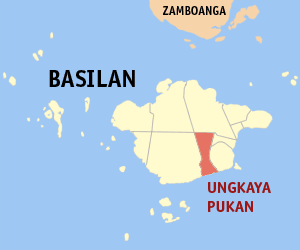
- Map of Basilan with Ungkaya Pukan highlighted
- Interactive map of Ungkaya Pukan
- Location within the Philippines
- Coordinates: 6°29′39″N 122°06′31″E
- Country: Philippines
- Region: Bangsamoro Autonomous Region in Muslim Mindanao
- Province: Basilan
- House district: Lone district
- Parliamentary district: 3rd district
- Founded: May 22, 2006
- Barangays: 12 (see Barangays)

Government
  - Type: Sangguniang Bayan
  - Mayor: Jomar M. Maturan
  - Vice Mayor: Ahmadin T. Barahim
  - House Representative: Yusop T. Alano
  - Municipal Council: Members: Ahyar H. Sulaiman; Aley Ahmad A. Fernandez; Khalifa B. Abih; Muhtamad M. Aidil; Marham T. Maturan; Nuldahman A. Sanggilahan; Madz T. Maturan; Mahmoda A. Indal
  - Electorate: 11,760 voters (2025)

Area
  - Total: 96.13 km^{2} (37.12 sq mi)
- Elevation: 123 m (404 ft)
- Highest elevation: 996 m (3,268 ft)
- Lowest elevation: 0 m (0 ft)

Population (2024 census)
  - Total: 31,041
  - Density: 322.9/km^{2} (836.3/sq mi)
  - Households: 4,039

Economy
  - Income class: 4th municipal income class
  - Poverty incidence: 58.56% (2023)
  - Revenue: ₱ 127 million (2024)
  - Assets: ₱ 410.7 million (2024)
  - Expenditure: ₱ 62.1 million (2024)
  - Liabilities: ₱ 266.4 million (2024)

Service provider
  - Electricity: Basilan Electric Cooperative (BASELCO)
- Time zone: UTC+8 (PST)
- ZIP code: 7304
- PSGC: 1900711000
- IDD : area code: +63 (0)62
- Native languages: Yakan; Chavacano; Tagalog

Ungkaya Pukan, officially the Municipality of Ungkaya Pukan (Tausūg: Lupah Ungkaya Pukan; Chavacano: Municipalidad de Ungkaya Pukan; Tagalog: Bayan ng Ungkaya Pukan), is a municipality in the province of Basilan, Philippines. According to the 2024 census, it has a population of 31,041 people.

== History ==
Named after Orang Kaya (nobleman) Pukan, a Yakan chieftain that fought valiantly against Pedro Javier Cuevas aka Datu Kalun and his Christianized Yakan warriors backed by the Spaniards.

Ungkaya Pukan was created by Muslim Mindanao Autonomy Act No. 190, ratified by plebiscite on May 22, 2006. It is composed of 12 barangays that were formerly part of Tipo-Tipo.

== Geography ==
=== Barangays ===
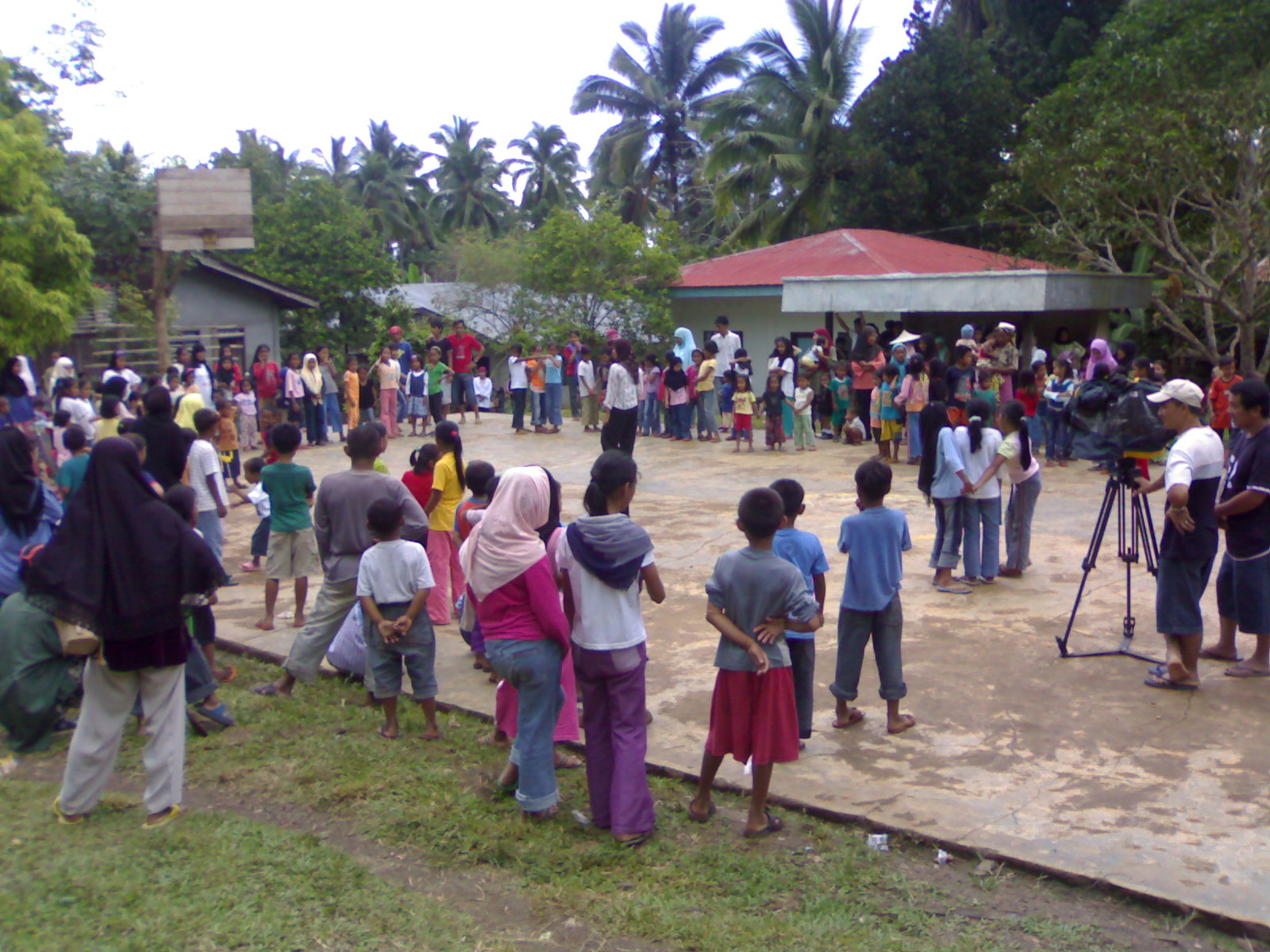
Outreach program in Barangay Materling in 2009

Ungkaya Pukan is politically subdivided into 12 barangays. Each barangay consists of puroks while some have sitios.

PSGC	Barangay	Population			±% p.a.	
		2024		2010		
150711001	Amaloy	3.6%	1,129	980	▴	0.99%
150711002	Bohe-Pahuh	4.6%	1,437	1,499	▾	−0.29%
150711003	Bohe-Suyak	9.0%	2,804	2,128	▴	1.93%
150711004	Cabangalan	3.3%	1,010	1,136	▾	−0.81%
150711005	Danit	2.6%	818	824	▾	−0.05%
150711006	Kamamburingan	3.3%	1,018	1,223	▾	−1.27%
150711007	Matata	3.8%	1,170	1,041	▴	0.81%
150711008	Materling	7.4%	2,296	2,268	▴	0.09%
150711009	Pipil	7.7%	2,375	2,069	▴	0.96%
150711010	Sungkayut	3.0%	931	1,040	▾	−0.77%
150711011	Tongbato	4.7%	1,446	1,371	▴	0.37%
150711012	Ulitan	6.5%	2,007	2,122	▾	−0.39%
	Total		31,041	17,701	▴	3.98%

=== Climate ===
Climate data for Ungkaya Pukan, Basilan
Month	Jan	Feb	Mar	Apr	May	Jun	Jul	Aug	Sep	Oct	Nov	Dec	Year
Mean daily maximum °C (°F)	26 (79)	26 (79)	26 (79)	27 (81)	27 (81)	27 (81)	27 (81)	27 (81)	27 (81)	27 (81)	27 (81)	27 (81)	27 (81)
Mean daily minimum °C (°F)	26 (79)	26 (79)	26 (79)	26 (79)	27 (81)	27 (81)	26 (79)	26 (79)	26 (79)	27 (81)	26 (79)	26 (79)	26 (80)
Average precipitation mm (inches)	130 (5.1)	91 (3.6)	100 (3.9)	114 (4.5)	242 (9.5)	329 (13.0)	347 (13.7)	321 (12.6)	223 (8.8)	273 (10.7)	239 (9.4)	140 (5.5)	2,549 (100.3)
Average rainy days	16.5	14.3	14.9	15.5	23.8	25.3	25.3	25.3	21.5	23.0	21.1	17.5	244
Source: Meteoblue (modeled/calculated data, not measured locally)

== Demographics ==
Population census of Ungkaya Pukan
Year	Pop.	±% p.a.
2007	30,472	—
2010	17,701	−17.94%
2015	18,441	+0.78%
2020	24,016	+5.72%
2024	31,041	+6.35%
Source: Philippine Statistics Authority

In the 2024 census, Ungkaya Pukan had a population of 31,041. The population density was 320 inhabitants per square kilometre (830/sq mi).

== Economy ==
Poverty Incidence of Ungkaya Pukan

Source: Philippine Statistics Authority
