= 2010 Philippine House of Representatives elections in Eastern Visayas =

Philippine House of Representatives elections in Eastern Visayas, 2010
- May 10, 2010

12 seats of Eastern Visayas in the House of Representatives
	First party	Second party	Third party
Party	Lakas–Kampi	Liberal	Nacionalista
Seats won	8	2	1
Popular vote	833,850	284,557	133,001
Percentage	48.96%	16.71%	7.81%
	Fourth party	Fifth party
Party	PMP	NPC
Seats won	0	0
Popular vote	114,427	58,699
Percentage	6.72%	3.45%
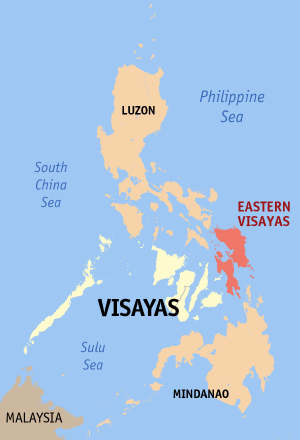
- Location of Eastern Visayas within the country.

Elections were held in Eastern Visayas for seats in the House of Representatives of the Philippines on May 10, 2010.

The candidate with the most votes won that district's seat for the 15th Congress of the Philippines.

== Summary ==
Party	Popular vote	%	Seats won
Lakas–Kampi	833,850	48.96%	8
Liberal	284,557	16.71%	2
Nacionalista	133,001	7.81%	1
PMP	114,427	6.72%	0
NPC	58,699	3.45%	0
PDSP	30,583	1.80%	0
PDP–Laban	4,996	0.29%	0
Bangon Pilipinas	1,998	0.12%	0
PGRP	193	0.01%	0
Independent	240,867	14.14%	1
Valid votes	1,703,161	87.59%	12
Invalid votes	241,391	12.41%	
Turnout	1,944,552	79.67%	
Registered voters	2,440,757	100.00%	

== Biliran ==
The result of the election is under protest in the House of Representatives Electoral Tribunal.

Candidate	Party	Votes	%
Rogelio Espina	Nacionalista Party	40,010	50.10
Glenn Chong (incumbent)	Lakas–Kampi–CMD	39,649	49.65
Paul Diu	Independent	203	0.25
Total		79,862	100.00
Valid votes		79,862	97.24
Invalid/blank votes		2,265	2.76
Total votes		82,127	100.00
Nacionalista Party gain from Lakas–Kampi–CMD			
Source: Commission on Elections

== Eastern Samar ==
Teodulo Coquilla is the incumbent, but his party Lakas-Kampi-CMD did not nominate anybody in this district. He is running as an independent.

Candidate	Party	Votes	%
Ben Evardone	Independent	74,082	38.07
Teodulo Coquilla (incumbent)	Independent	66,222	34.03
Raymond Apita	Nationalist People's Coalition	25,932	13.33
Mateo Biong Jr.	Pwersa ng Masang Pilipino	17,682	9.09
Maximo Aljibe	Nacionalista Party	9,108	4.68
Conrado Macasa Sr.	Independent	806	0.41
Angelo Miguel	Independent	577	0.30
Febidal Padel	Philippine Green Republican Party	193	0.10
Total		194,602	100.00
Valid votes		194,602	91.05
Invalid/blank votes		19,137	8.95
Total votes		213,739	100.00
Independent hold			
Source: Commission on Elections

== Leyte ==
=== 1st District ===
Martin Romualdez is the incumbent.

Candidate	Party	Votes	%
Martin Romualdez (incumbent)	Lakas–Kampi–CMD	99,807	60.05
Feliciano Clemencio	Independent	66,403	39.95
Total		166,210	100.00
Valid votes		166,210	86.01
Invalid/blank votes		27,031	13.99
Total votes		193,241	100.00
Lakas–Kampi–CMD hold			
Source: Commission on Elections

=== 2nd District ===
Incumbent Trinidad Apostol is in her third consecutive term already and is ineligible for reelection. Her husband Sergio is her party's nominee for the district's seat.

Candidate	Party	Votes	%
Sergio Apostol	Lakas–Kampi–CMD	77,561	56.78
Rustico Balderian	Partido Demokratiko Sosyalista ng Pilipinas	30,583	22.39
Ashley Alvero	Pwersa ng Masang Pilipino	13,095	9.59
Alberto Hidalgo	Liberal Party	9,157	6.70
Pastor Trimor Jr.	Bangon Pilipinas	3,200	2.34
Von Kaiser Soro	Independent	1,988	1.46
Bartolome Lawsin	Independent	1,012	0.74
Total		136,596	100.00
Valid votes		136,596	75.19
Invalid/blank votes		45,069	24.81
Total votes		181,665	100.00
Lakas–Kampi–CMD hold			
Source: Commission on Elections

=== 3rd District ===
Andres Salvacion Jr. is the incumbent.

Candidate	Party	Votes	%
Andres Salvacion Jr. (incumbent)	Lakas–Kampi–CMD	48,083	59.48
Eduardo Veloso	Nacionalista Party	31,311	38.73
Edwin Pfleider	Liberal Party	1,007	1.25
Paquito Pelipel Jr.	Independent	435	0.54
Total		80,836	100.00
Valid votes		80,836	92.44
Invalid/blank votes		6,615	7.56
Total votes		87,451	100.00
Lakas–Kampi–CMD hold			
Source: Commission on Elections

=== 4th District ===
Eufrocino Codilla, Sr. is in his third consecutive term already and is ineligible for reelection. His son Eufrocino Jr. will run in his place. Actor Richard Gomez was disqualified when the Commission on Elections granted the petition of disqualification filed by Buenaventura Juntilla against Gomez. Gomez was replaced by his wife, TV host Lucy Torres-Gomez. The name of Richard Gomez will remain in the ballot and will go to Lucy Torres-Gomez.

Codilla placed the result of the election under protest in the House of Representatives Electoral Tribunal. The tribunal ruled on May 25, 2012 that Lucy Torrez-Gomez's substitution of her husband was legal, thereby acknowledging votes for her as valid and not stray. On March 19, 2013, or three months before Torres-Gomez's term was to end, the Supreme Court granted the petition of Silverio Tagolino, who argued that since Gomez was disqualified in the first place, his substitute cannot be allowed to run; the decision, which had 7 justices concurring, 4 dissenting and 4 abstaining, effectively removed Torres-Gomez from her post. Torres-Gomez is appealing the case.

Candidate	Party	Votes	%
Lucy Torres-Gomez	Liberal Party	101,250	56.79
Eufrocino Codilla Jr.	Lakas–Kampi–CMD	76,549	42.93
Silverio Tagolino	Independent	493	0.28
Total		178,292	100.00
Valid votes		178,292	94.01
Invalid/blank votes		11,352	5.99
Total votes		189,644	100.00
Liberal Party gain from Lakas–Kampi–CMD			
Source: Commission on Elections

=== 5th District ===
Incumbent Carmen Cari is in third consecutive term already and is ineligible for reelection. Her son Baybay mayor Jose Carlos is her party's nominee for the district's seat and is running unopposed.

Candidate	Party	Votes	%
Jose Carlos Cari	Lakas–Kampi–CMD	118,113	100.00
Total		118,113	100.00
Valid votes		118,113	68.18
Invalid/blank votes		55,119	31.82
Total votes		173,232	100.00
Lakas–Kampi–CMD hold			
Source: Commission on Elections

== Northern Samar ==
=== 1st District ===
Incumbent Paul Daza is running as governor of Northern Samar; his father provincial governor Raul is his party's nominee for the district's seat.

Candidate	Party	Votes	%
Raul Daza	Liberal Party	79,880	59.85
Francisco Rosales Jr.	Lakas–Kampi–CMD	50,430	37.78
Hildegardes Dineros	Independent	3,168	2.37
Total		133,478	100.00
Valid votes		133,478	90.68
Invalid/blank votes		13,722	9.32
Total votes		147,200	100.00
Liberal Party hold			
Source: Commission on Elections

=== 2nd District ===
Emil Ong is the incumbent.

The result of the election is under protest in the House of Representatives Electoral Tribunal.

Candidate	Party	Votes	%
Emil Ong (incumbent)	Lakas–Kampi–CMD	56,791	51.34
Antonio Lucero	Liberal Party	53,833	48.66
Total		110,624	100.00
Valid votes		110,624	89.27
Invalid/blank votes		13,296	10.73
Total votes		123,920	100.00
Lakas–Kampi–CMD hold			
Source: Commission on Elections

== Samar ==
=== 1st District ===
Reynaldo Uy is in his third consecutive term already and is ineligible for reelection. His party nominated Calbayog mayor Mel Senen Sarmiento as their nominee for the district's seat.

Candidate	Party	Votes	%
Mel Senen Sarmiento	Lakas–Kampi–CMD	82,787	56.81
Rodolfo Tuazon	Nacionalista Party	52,572	36.07
Rodrigo Tuazon	Independent	5,731	3.93
Alex Tuazon	Independent	2,766	1.90
Mario Roño	Nationalist People's Coalition	1,879	1.29
Total		145,735	100.00
Valid votes		145,735	93.74
Invalid/blank votes		9,740	6.26
Total votes		155,475	100.00
Lakas–Kampi–CMD hold			
Source: Commission on Elections

=== 2nd District ===
Incumbent Sharee Ann Tan will run for governor of Samar. Her mother, governor Milagrosa is her party's nominee for the district's seat.

The result of the election is under protest in the House of Representatives Electoral Tribunal.

Candidate	Party	Votes	%
Milagrosa Tan	Lakas–Kampi–CMD	58,168	36.99
Wilfredo Estorninos	Liberal Party	39,430	25.08
Manuel Van Torresvillas	Nationalist People's Coalition	30,888	19.64
Catalino Figueroa	Pwersa ng Masang Pilipino	22,055	14.03
Alvin Abejuela	PDP–Laban	4,996	3.18
Urbano Alli Jr.	Independent	1,708	1.09
Total		157,245	100.00
Valid votes		157,245	82.11
Invalid/blank votes		34,267	17.89
Total votes		191,512	100.00
Lakas–Kampi–CMD hold			
Source: Commission on Elections

== Southern Leyte ==
Roger Mercado is the incumbent.

Candidate	Party	Votes	%
Roger Mercado (incumbent)	Lakas–Kampi–CMD	125,912	66.60
Aniceto Saludo Jr.	Pwersa ng Masang Pilipino	61,595	32.58
Vicente Geraldo	Independent	961	0.51
Jeffrey Roden	Independent	590	0.31
Total		189,058	100.00
Valid votes		189,058	91.53
Invalid/blank votes		17,500	8.47
Total votes		206,558	100.00
Lakas–Kampi–CMD hold			
Source: Commission on Elections
