= Haber Amin Asarul =

Filipino politician

Haber "Habs" Amin Asarul (LKS-KAM) is a Filipino politician current mayor Sumisip in Basilan (2010–13).
