= Tabuan-Lasa =

Municipality in Basilan, Philippines

Tabuan-Lasa تابوان-لسا
- Municipality
- Municipality of Tabuan-Lasa
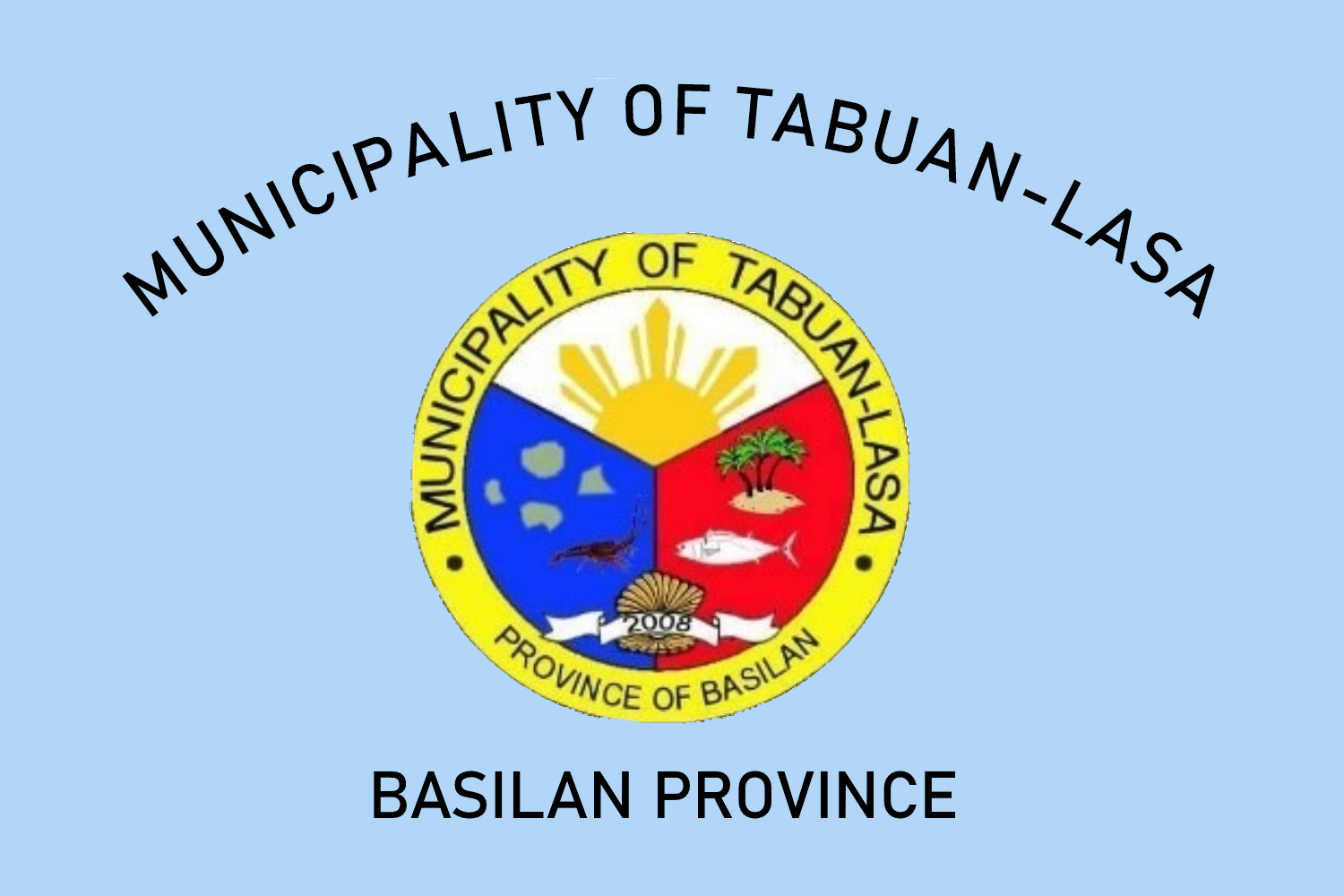
- Flag Seal

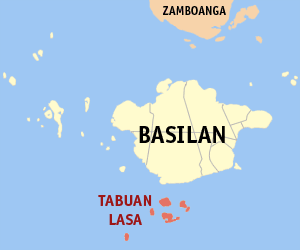
- Map of Basilan with Tabuan-Lasa highlighted
- Interactive map of Tabuan-Lasa
- Location within the Philippines
- Coordinates: 6°19′05″N 121°55′20″E
- Country: Philippines
- Region: Bangsamoro Autonomous Region in Muslim Mindanao
- Province: Basilan
- House district: Lone district
- Parliamentary district: 3rd district
- Founded: March 29, 2008
- Barangays: 12 (see Barangays)

Government
  - Type: Sangguniang Bayan
  - Mayor: Moner S. Manisan
  - Vice Mayor: Isnirul S. Ahalul
  - House Representative: Yusop T. Alano
  - Municipal Council: Members: Muctar Y. Junaid; Farouck L. Alpad; Al-Khapid L. Junaid; Halil E. Haji; Hakim A. Harun; Muktadir M. Abdussalam; Ahiya K. Abubakar; Mahdar S. Abdulkarim
  - Electorate: 18,140 voters (2025)

Area
  - Total: 80.5 km^{2} (31.1 sq mi)
- Elevation: 6.0 m (19.7 ft)
- Highest elevation: 327 m (1,073 ft)
- Lowest elevation: 0 m (0 ft)

Population (2024 census)
  - Total: 38,964
  - Density: 484/km^{2} (1,250/sq mi)
  - Households: 4,499

Economy
  - Income class: 4th municipal income class
  - Poverty incidence: 48.22% (2023)
  - Revenue: ₱ 131.7 million (2024)
  - Assets: ₱ 149.3 million (2024)
  - Expenditure: ₱ 54.51 million (2024)
  - Liabilities: ₱ 2.794 million (2024)

Service provider
  - Electricity: Basilan Electric Cooperative (BASELCO)
- Time zone: UTC+8 (PST)
- ZIP code: 7305
- PSGC: 1900713000
- IDD : area code: +63 (0)62
- Native languages: Yakan; Chavacano; Tagalog
- Website: www.tabuan-lasa.gov.ph

Tabuan-Lasa, officially the Municipality of Tabuan-Lasa (Tausūg: Lupah Tabuan-Lasa; Chavacano: Municipalidad de Tabuan-Lasa; Tagalog: Bayan ng Tabuan-Lasa), is a municipality in the province of Basilan, Philippines. According to the 2024 census, it has a population of 38,964 people.

Tabuan-Lasa was created out of the 12 barangays of Sumisip that were not on Basilan Island, through Muslim Mindanao Autonomy Act No. 187, which was subsequently ratified in a plebiscite held on March 29, 2008.

== Geography ==
=== Barangays ===
Tabuan-Lasa is politically subdivided into 12 barangays. Each barangay consists of puroks while some have sitios.

PSGC	Barangay	Population			±% p.a.	
		2024		2010		
150713001	Babag (Babuan Island)	5.6%	2,179	1,799	▴	1.34%
150713002	Balanting	3.6%	1,411	937	▴	2.88%
150713003	Boloh-boloh	3.2%	1,261	814	▴	3.09%
150713004	Bukut-Umus	7.7%	2,984	2,061	▴	2.60%
150713005	Kaumpurnah	5.0%	1,947	1,582	▴	1.45%
150713006	Lanawan	10.7%	4,174	2,103	▴	4.88%
150713007	Pisak-pisak	2.5%	958	847	▴	0.86%
150713008	Saluping	5.5%	2,128	1,993	▴	0.46%
150713009	Suligan (Babuan Island)	2.8%	1,078	1,112	▾	−0.22%
150713010	Sulloh (Tapiantana)	4.6%	1,785	1,260	▴	2.45%
150713011	Tambulig Buton	4.1%	1,582	1,535	▴	0.21%
150713012	Tong-Umus	6.9%	2,701	2,592	▴	0.29%
	Total		38,964	18,635	▴	5.26%

=== Climate ===
Climate data for Tabuan-Lasa, Basilan
Month	Jan	Feb	Mar	Apr	May	Jun	Jul	Aug	Sep	Oct	Nov	Dec	Year
Mean daily maximum °C (°F)	27 (81)	27 (81)	27 (81)	28 (82)	28 (82)	28 (82)	28 (82)	28 (82)	28 (82)	28 (82)	28 (82)	28 (82)	28 (82)
Mean daily minimum °C (°F)	27 (81)	27 (81)	27 (81)	27 (81)	28 (82)	28 (82)	28 (82)	28 (82)	28 (82)	28 (82)	27 (81)	27 (81)	28 (82)
Average precipitation mm (inches)	129 (5.1)	85 (3.3)	101 (4.0)	111 (4.4)	227 (8.9)	303 (11.9)	303 (11.9)	285 (11.2)	197 (7.8)	254 (10.0)	219 (8.6)	136 (5.4)	2,350 (92.5)
Average rainy days	15.9	13.5	15.1	14.8	22.9	24.7	24.9	24.3	20.7	22.6	20.5	17.4	237.3
Source: Meteoblue (modeled/calculated data, not measured locally)

== Demographics ==
Population census of Tabuan-Lasa
Year	Pop.	±% p.a.
2010	18,635	—
2015	24,188	+5.09%
2020	29,327	+4.14%
2024	38,964	+7.06%
Source: Philippine Statistics Authority

In the 2024 census, Tabuan-Lasa had a population of 38,964. The population density was 480 inhabitants per square kilometre (1,200/sq mi).

== Economy ==
Poverty Incidence of Tabuan-Lasa

Source: Philippine Statistics Authority
