= Basilan's 3rd parliamentary district =

Parliamentary district for the Bangsamoro Parliament

- Constituency for the Bangsamoro Parliament
- Boundary of Basilan's 3rd parliamentary district in Basilan
- Province: Basilan
- Population: 125,783 (2024)
- Electorate: 60,402 (2026)
- Major settlements: Sumisip; Tabuan-Lasa; Ungkaya Pukan

Current constituency
- Member of Parliament: Abrar Hataman (elect)
- Political party: BFP

Basilan's 3rd parliamentary district is the third of the four parliamentary districts of the province of Basilan for the Bangsamoro Parliament. It is composed of the municipalities of Sumisip, Tabuan-Lasa, and Ungkaya Pukan.

Abrar Hataman of the Bangsamoro Federalist Party is the member of Parliament-elect for the district following the inaugural 2026 Bangsamoro Parliament election. He will assume office on October 30, 2026.

== Boundaries ==
=== 2024–2025 ===
The parliamentary districts of Bangsamoro was after the passage of Bangsamoro Act No. 58 into law. The bill was approved on February 28, 2024 by the Bangsamoro Parliament and was signed by Chief Minister Murad Ebrahim.

The initial boundaries of the Basilan's 2nd parliamentary district is as follows:

- Hadji Muhtamad
- Lantawan
- Maluso
- Sumisip
- Tabuan-Lasa

The constituency was not filled during this period as the first regular Bangsamoro Parliament election has been postponed.

=== Current (2025–present) ===
After the Supreme Court excluded Sulu from the Bangsamoro region in Septemeber 2024, the Bangsamoro Parliament was prompted to redistribute the seats allocated to Sulu. The configuration was promulgated via Bangsamoro Autonomy Act No. 77, signed by Chief Minister Abdulraof Macacua on August 28, 2025 reconfigured the Basilan third district. The town of Sumisip and Tabuan Lasa were retained and Ungkaya Pukan was added to the Basilan third district.

Both Acts No. 58 and 77 were declared unconstitutional by the Supreme Court which also ordered the parliament to make a new law anew. Macacua signed a new bill into law on January 20, 2026, becoming Bangsamoro Autonomy Act No. 86.

As per Bangsamoro Autonomy Act No. 86, the local government units under Basilan's 3rd district are as follows:

- Sumisip
- Tabuan-Lasa
- Ungkaya Pukan

== List of MPs representing the district ==
No.	Portrait	Member (Lifespan)	Term of office	Party	Parliament	Electoral history	Constituencies
1		Abrar Hataman (born 1999)	Assuming office on October 30, 2026	BFP	1st Parliament	Elected in 2026.	2026–present Sumisip, Tabuan-Lasa, Ungkaya Pukan

== Election results ==
=== 2026 ===
2026 Bangsamoro Parliament election in Basilan
Party	Candidate	Votes	%
BFP	Abrar Hataman	45,094	90.64
BaPa	Khan Hasalal	4,656	9.36
Total votes		49,750	100.00
BFP win (new seat)			
