= Sumisip =

Municipality in Basilan, Philippines

Sumisip سوميسيڤ
- Municipality
- Municipality of Sumisip
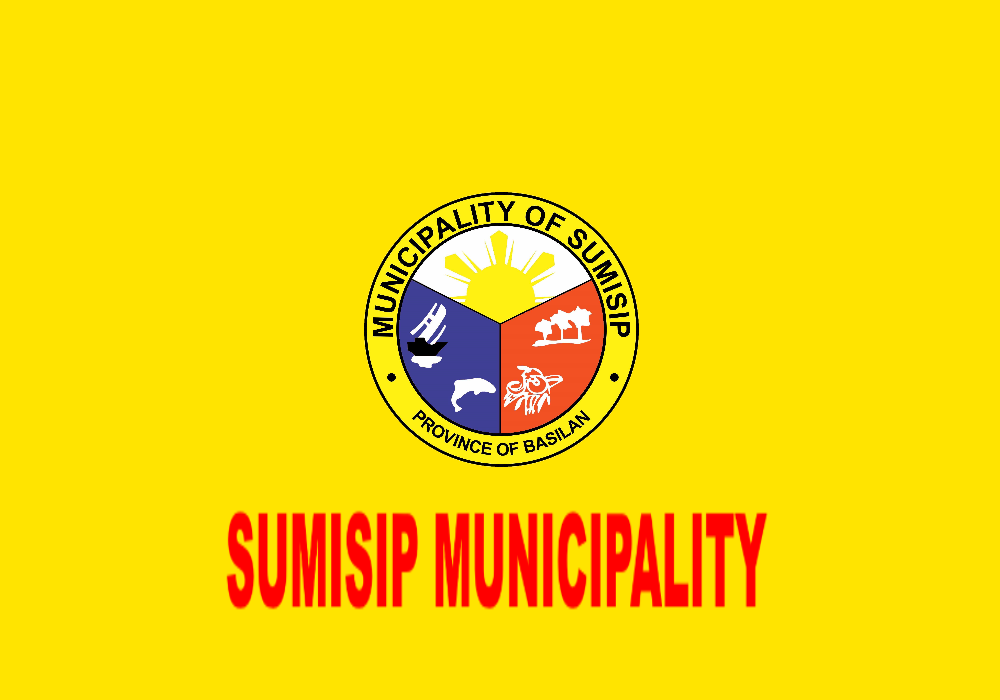
- Flag Seal

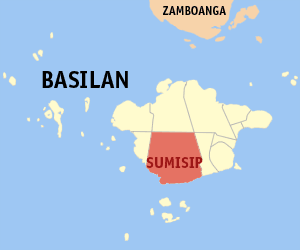
- Map of Basilan with Sumisip highlighted
- Interactive map of Sumisip
- Location within the Philippines
- Coordinates: 6°25′11″N 122°02′03″E
- Country: Philippines
- Region: Bangsamoro Autonomous Region in Muslim Mindanao
- Province: Basilan
- House district: Lone district
- Parliamentary district: 3rd district
- Barangays: 29 (see Barangays)

Government
  - Type: Sangguniang Bayan
  - Mayor: Jul-Adnan P. Hataman
  - Vice Mayor: Gulam S. Hataman
  - House Representative: Yusop T. Alano
  - Municipal Council: Members: Juhan S. Hataman; Kandalvi U. Hataman; Mun-in K. Hataman; Abuwalid I. Tarama; Abdulsaffar J. Samat; Martin L. Muslimin; Anwar S. Kannama; Marad A. Abdulkarim
  - Electorate: 25,002 voters (2025)

Area
  - Total: 567.60 km^{2} (219.15 sq mi)
- Elevation: 136 m (446 ft)
- Highest elevation: 999 m (3,278 ft)
- Lowest elevation: 0 m (0 ft)

Population (2024 census)
  - Total: 55,778
  - Density: 98.270/km^{2} (254.52/sq mi)
  - Households: 8,447

Economy
  - Income class: 1st municipal income class
  - Poverty incidence: 50.96% (2023)
  - Revenue: ₱ 290.6 million (2024)
  - Assets: ₱ 606.3 million (2024)
  - Expenditure: ₱ 290.6 million (2024)
  - Liabilities: ₱ 420.8 million (2024)

Service provider
  - Electricity: Basilan Electric Cooperative (BASELCO)
- Time zone: UTC+8 (PST)
- ZIP code: 7305
- PSGC: 1900705000
- IDD : area code: +63 (0)62
- Native languages: Yakan; Chavacano; Tagalog
- Website: lgu-sumisip.com

Sumisip, officially the Municipality of Sumisip (Yakan: Bulak Sumisip; Chavacano: Municipalidad de Sumisip; Tagalog: Bayan ng Sumisip), is a municipality in the province of Basilan, Philippines. According to the 2024 census, it has a population of 55,778 people.

12 barangays that were not on Basilan Island seceded to form the municipality of Tabuan-Lasa through Muslim Mindanao Autonomy Act No. 187, which was subsequently ratified in a plebiscite held on March 29, 2008.

== History ==
On August 2, 1993, vice mayor Sattaman Hataman was seriously injured in an ambush by Muslim rebels whilst riding a jeep home with his family and bodyguards; his wife Nora and daughter Hasma were killed during the attack, while a bodyguard was held hostage.

On December 4, 1995, former mayor Abdulgafor Abubakar was about to ride his motorcycle parked near the Isabela Central Elementary Pilot School in Isabela City, Basilan when he was assassinated by two gunmen. Though he was rushed to a nearby hospital, Abubakar died from his wounds an hour after the shooting. In the early morning of October 14, 1996, a bomb exploded under the house of mayor Abdulati Tahajid in Barangay Guiong, who had been sleeping in a different house nearby with his family and thus managed to avoid the explosion.

== Geography ==
=== Barangays ===
Sumisip is politically subdivided into 29 barangays. Each barangay consists of puroks while some have sitios.

PSGC	Barangay	Population			±% p.a.	
		2024		2010		
150705001	Bacung	3.4%	1,900	2,028	▾	−0.45%
150705027	Baiwas	1.9%	1,049	974	▴	0.52%
150705028	Basak	2.2%	1,237	1,107	▴	0.77%
150705002	Benembengan Lower	1.5%	810	582	▴	2.32%
150705035	Benembengan Upper	2.6%	1,443	1,017	▴	2.46%
150705036	Bohe-languyan	1.4%	797	777	▴	0.18%
150705006	Buli-buli	2.3%	1,271	1,021	▴	1.53%
150705007	Cabcaban	2.5%	1,413	1,293	▴	0.62%
150705029	Cabengbeng Lower	2.2%	1,237	1,131	▴	0.62%
150705030	Cabengbeng Upper	2.3%	1,264	1,602	▾	−1.63%
150705039	Ettub-ettub	3.2%	1,797	1,296	▴	2.30%
150705010	Guiong	4.6%	2,560	2,471	▴	0.25%
150705041	Kaum-Air	1.5%	828	825	▴	0.03%
150705051	Kaumpamatsakem	2.0%	1,120	841	▴	2.01%
150705024	Libug	2.4%	1,320	1,252	▴	0.37%
150705042	Limbocandis	1.6%	878	631	▴	2.32%
150705043	Lukketon	3.0%	1,662	1,544	▴	0.51%
150705031	Luuk-Bait	2.8%	1,553	1,719	▾	−0.70%
150705032	Mahatalang	2.1%	1,190	1,254	▾	−0.36%
150705013	Manaul	3.4%	1,887	1,666	▴	0.87%
150705014	Mangal (Poblacion)	5.4%	3,008	2,207	▴	2.17%
150705044	Marang	1.8%	1,014	1,078	▾	−0.42%
150705045	Mebak	2.3%	1,302	754	▴	3.87%
150705047	Sahaya Bohe Bato	2.9%	1,630	1,208	▴	2.10%
150705048	Sapah Bulak	2.6%	1,452	1,091	▴	2.01%
150705019	Sumisip Central	3.0%	1,671	1,462	▴	0.93%
150705050	Tikus	2.7%	1,482	1,069	▴	2.29%
150705025	Tongsengal	1.9%	1,036	1,095	▾	−0.38%
150705022	Tumahubong	3.4%	1,919	2,036	▾	−0.41%
	Total		55,778	37,031	▴	2.89%

=== Climate ===
Climate data for Sumisip, Basilan
Month	Jan	Feb	Mar	Apr	May	Jun	Jul	Aug	Sep	Oct	Nov	Dec	Year
Mean daily maximum °C (°F)	27 (81)	27 (81)	27 (81)	28 (82)	28 (82)	28 (82)	28 (82)	28 (82)	28 (82)	28 (82)	28 (82)	28 (82)	28 (82)
Mean daily minimum °C (°F)	27 (81)	26 (79)	27 (81)	27 (81)	28 (82)	28 (82)	27 (81)	28 (82)	28 (82)	28 (82)	27 (81)	27 (81)	27 (81)
Average precipitation mm (inches)	129 (5.1)	85 (3.3)	101 (4.0)	111 (4.4)	227 (8.9)	303 (11.9)	303 (11.9)	285 (11.2)	197 (7.8)	254 (10.0)	219 (8.6)	136 (5.4)	2,350 (92.5)
Average rainy days	15.9	13.5	15.1	14.8	22.9	24.7	24.9	24.3	20.7	22.6	20.5	17.4	237.3
Source: Meteoblue (modeled/calculated data, not measured locally)

== Demographics ==
Population census of Sumisip

Year	Pop.	±% p.a.
1960	13,055	—
1970	14,085	+0.76%
1975	20,885	+8.22%
1980	29,696	+7.29%
1990	33,301	+1.15%
1995	42,003	+4.45%

Year	Pop.	±% p.a.
2000	51,712	+4.56%
2007	71,807	+4.63%
2010	37,031	−21.42%
2015	41,730	+2.30%
2020	47,345	+2.69%
2024	55,778	+4.01%

Source: Philippine Statistics Authority

In the 2024 census, Sumisip had a population of 55,778.

== Economy ==
Poverty Incidence of Sumisip

Source: Philippine Statistics Authority

== Notable people ==
- Haber Amin Asarul, politician
