= Philippine Green Republican Party =

Political party in the Philippines

- Chairman: Felix Cabrera
- Founded: 2004
- Ideology: Green politics
- Political position: Centre-left
- Colors: Green
- Slogan: Protect our Mother Land
- Senate: 0 / 24
- House of Representatives: 0 / 304

The Philippine Green Republican Party, commonly known as PGRP, is a political party in the Philippines.

== History ==
In 2007, the party was accredited by the Commission on Elections and fielded Senate candidates who were later declared nuisance candidates. In 2010, they again fielded national candidates and local candidates including a presidential candidate, Felix Cabrera. He, together with their senatorial candidates were declared nuisance candidates. Local candidates from PGRP were however able to run in local positions in 11 provinces nationwide. However, all these candidates lost.

== Ideology and electoral history ==
Many serious environmentalist and greens believe after analyzing the political agenda of the Philippine Green Republican Party that they do not share the basic green principles and agenda to merit being considered a serious and legitimate national green political party. They did not participate in the 2013 elections but they have participated in the 2016 presidential elections. They fielded Apolonia "Polly" Soguilon (as a substitute for the late Roy Señeres) and Diego Palomares as their standard bearers for the 2016 polls.
