= Jomar Malangkit Maturan =

Filipino politician

Jomar "Jom" Malangkit Maturan is a Filipino politician and current mayor of Ungkaya Pukan. Ungkaya Pukan is a relatively new municipality in Basilan carved out of Tipo-Tipo in 2006.

== Political and business activities ==
Maturan was previously the mayor of Tipo-Tipo and a board member of the 2nd District (2001–04, 2004–07). He became mayor of Ungkaya Pukan after an administrative redistribution which created three new districts out of Tipo-Tipo.

Maturan was allied with the family of slain leader Wahab Akbar until he signaled his intention to run for governor of the province in 2010, at which point relations may have soured.

== Implication in Basilan bombing ==
In April 2010, Maturan was one of two elected officials (along with Mujiv Hataman) implicated in a bombing attack in Isabela City carried out by the Abu Sayyaf Group. Captured ASG operatives fingered the two politicians just before the 2010 elections, who were subsequently detained by police. However, Maturan seems to have weathered this challenge, won re-election and (at least as of November 2010) is still in office.
