= Murad Ebrahim interim government =

Murad Ebrahim cabinet
- Interim cabinet of Bangsamoro
- Murad Ebrahim
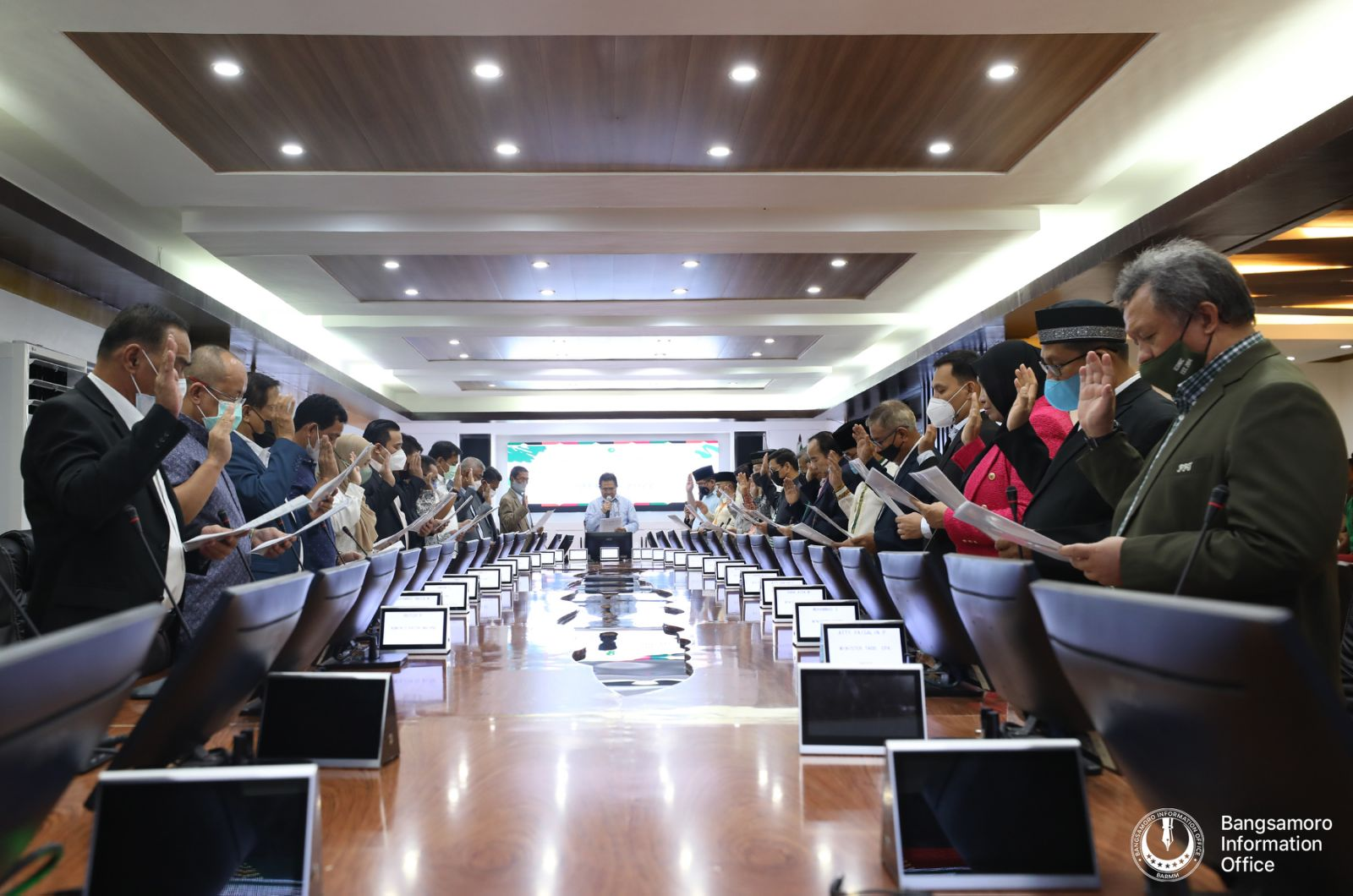
- Members taking oath as cabinet members on September 22, 2022
- Date formed: February 26, 2019
- Date dissolved: March 12, 2025

People and organisations
- Wa'lī: Khalipha Nando (2019–2023); Omarkhalid Ampatuan (2023–2024); Muslim Guiamaden (2024–2025)
- Chief Minister: Murad Ebrahim
- Member party: None; The Bangsamoro Organic Law mandates a majority (41 seats) for nominees of the Moro Islamic Liberation Front during the interim period
- Status in legislature: Interim government
- Opposition party: None (National government nominees)

History
- Election: None
- Legislature terms: 1st BTA Parliament (2019–2022); 2nd BTA Parliament (2022–2025)
- Successor: Macacua (interim)

The interim Bangsamoro Cabinet under interim Chief Minister Murad Ebrahim is the first Bangsamoro regional government cabinet. It was formed on February 26, 2019, following the constitution of the Bangsamoro Transition Authority, the interim governing body of the region.

On February 8, 2022, Ebrahim ordered the ministers and their deputies to tender courtesy resignations, while the director generals of each ministry were directed to temporarily take over. Three new ministers, most of whom assumed their posts at an undisclosed date, took their oaths on March 14, 2022.

On September 23, 2022, a new set of members took their oaths, most of whom were reappointed.

In late 2023, another major change occurred as several ministers filed courtesy resignations following an order from Ebrahim.

== Composition ==
Cabinet Members
Position	Minister	Took office	Left office
Minister of Agriculture, Fisheries and Agrarian Reform	Mohammad Suaib Yacob	February 26, 2019	—N/a
Minister of Basic, Higher and Technical Education	Mohagher Iqbal	February 26, 2019	—N/a
Minister of Environment, Natural Resources, and Energy	Abdulraof Macacua	February 26, 2019	—N/a
Minister of Environment, Natural Resources, and Energy	Akmad Brahim	2022 (Note: On February 8, 2022, ministers' predecessors were directed to tender courtesy resignation as part of a cabinet reshuffle. The successors took their oath on March 14, 2022 but the Bangsamoro Information Office notes that these officials assumed offices weeks ago from that date.)	—N/a
Minister of Finance, Budget and Management	Eduard Guerra	February 26	November 11, 2019
Minister of Finance, Budget and Management	Murad Ebrahim	November 11, 2019	2022 (Note: On February 8, 2022, the ministers were directed to tender courtesy resignation as part of a cabinet reshuffle. Actual resignation could have been tendered on or after that date until their successors took their oath on March 14, 2022. The Bangsamoro Information Office noted that the successors assumed offices weeks ago from March 14, 2022.)
Minister of Finance, Budget and Management	Ubaida Pacasem	2022	—N/a
Minister of Health	Saffrullah Dipatuan	February 26, 2019	2020
Minister of Health	Bashary Latiph	March 31, 2021	2022 (Note: Latiph was succeeded by OIC Minister Zul Qarneyn Abas whose assumption to office was publicized only on March 14, 2022.)
Minister of Health	Rizaldy Piang	November 9, 2022	2024
Minister of Health	Kadil Sinolinding Jr.	May 6, 2024	—N/a
Minister of Human Settlements and Development	Hamid Aminoddin Barra	—N/a	—N/a
Minister of Indigenous Peoples' Affairs	Melanio Ulama	February 26, 2019	—N/a
Minister of the Interior and Local Government	Naguib Sinarimbo	February 26, 2019	December 6, 2023
Minister of the Interior and Local Government	Sha Elijah Dumama-Alba	December 7, 2023	—N/a
Minister of Labor and Employment	Romeo Sema	June 3, 2019 – 2022	
Minister of Labor and Employment	Muslimin Sema	March 8, 2022	—N/a
Minister of Public Order and Safety	Hussein Muñoz	February 26, 2019	—N/a
Minister of Public Works	Murad Ebrahim	February 26	November 11, 2019
Minister of Public Works	Eduard Guerra	November 11, 2019	—N/a
Minister of Science and Technology	Aida Silongan	February 26, 2019	2025
Minister of Science and Technology	Jehan Usop (Acting)	May 27, 2025	—N/a
Minister of Social Services	Raissa Jajurie	February 26, 2019	—N/a
Minister of Trade, Investment, and Tourism	Abuamri Taddik	June 10, 2019	—N/a
Minister of Transportation and Communications	Dickson Hermoso	July 15, 2019	September 23, 2022
Minister of Transportation and Communications	Paisalin Tago	September 23, 2022	—N/a
Senior Minister	Abunawas Maslamama	April 17, 2023	—N/a
Cabinet Secretary	Asnin Pendatun	—N/a	—N/a
Chief of Staff	Alvin-Yasher K. Abdulgafar	—N/a	—N/a
Attorney General	Sha Elijah Dumama-Alba	—N/a	—N/a
Executive Secretary	Esmael Omar Pasigan	February 26, 2019	November 11, 2019
Executive Secretary	Abdulraof Macacua	November 11, 2019	April 5, 2023
