= Abdulraof Macacua interim government =

Former government in the Philippines

Abdulraof Macacua cabinet
- Interim cabinet of Bangsamoro
- Abdulraof Macacua
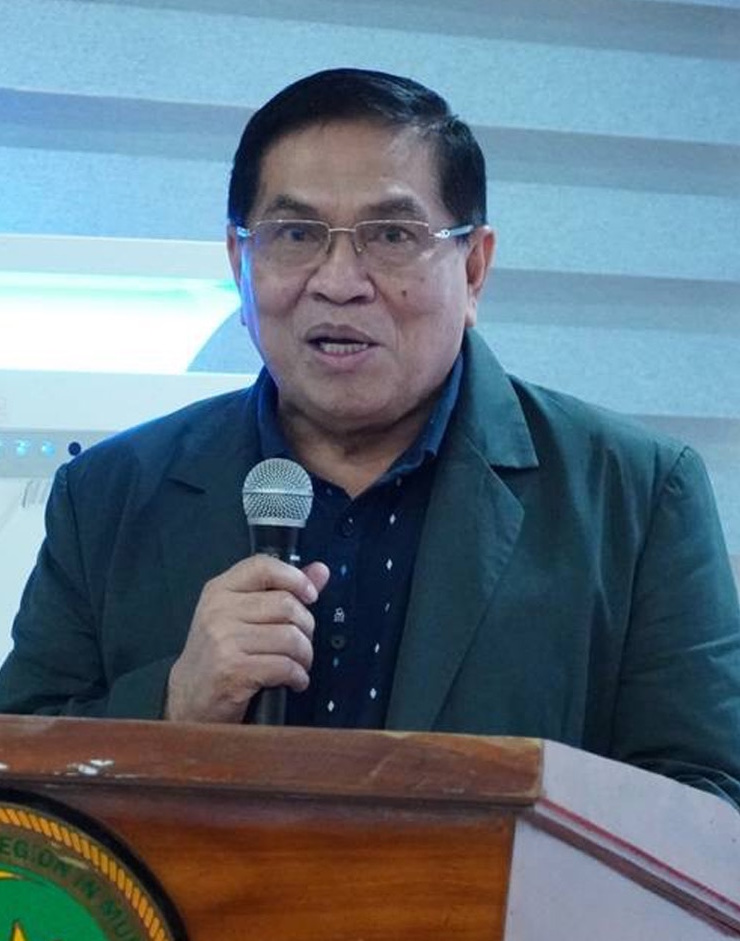
- Date formed: March 12, 2025

People and organisations
- Wa'lī: Muslim Guiamaden
- Chief Minister: Abdulraof Macacua
- Member party: None; The Bangsamoro Organic Law mandates a majority (41 seats) for nominees of the Moro Islamic Liberation Front during the interim period
- Status in legislature: Interim government
- Opposition party: None (National government nominees)

History
- Election: None
- Legislature term: 2nd BTA Parliament (2022–2025)
- Predecessor: Ebrahim (interim)
- Successor: Macacua (regular)

The interim Bangsamoro Cabinet under interim Chief Minister Abdulraof Macacua is the second and last interim Bangsamoro regional government cabinet.

Abdulraof Macacua took his oath as chief minister on March 12, 2025. The Macacua cabinet inherited the composition of Murad Ebrahim's cabinet. However, on June 23, 2025, Macacua issued Memorandum Circular No. 7, directing all appointed and designated ministers, deputy ministers, and heads of offices and agencies to tender their courtesy resignations. Macacua retained eleven of the fifteen heads of ministries.

== Composition ==
Cabinet Members
Position	Minister	Took office	Left office
Minister of Agriculture, Fisheries and Agrarian Reform	Mohammad Suaib Yacob	February 26, 2019	April 14, 2025
Minister of Agriculture, Fisheries and Agrarian Reform	Abunawas Maslamama (Note: Retentions from the June–August 2025 cabinet reshuffle)	April 14, 2025	—N/a
Minister of Environment, Natural Resources, and Energy	Akmad Brahim	2022	—N/a
Minister of Basic, Higher and Technical Education	Mohagher Iqbal	February 26, 2019	—N/a
Minister of Finance, Budget and Management	Ubaida Pacasem	2022	—N/a
Minister of Health	Kadil Sinolinding Jr.	May 6, 2024	—N/a
Minister of Human Settlements and Development	Hamid Aminoddin Barra	—N/a	—N/a
Minister of Indigenous Peoples' Affairs	Melanio Ulama	February 26, 2019	July 31, 2025
Minister of Indigenous Peoples' Affairs	Guiamal Abdulrahman	August 1, 2025	—N/a
Minister of the Interior and Local Government	Sha Elijah Dumama-Alba	December 7, 2023	July 21, 2025
Minister of the Interior and Local Government	Abdulraof Macacua	July 22, 2025	—N/a
Minister of Labor and Employment	Muslimin Sema	March 8, 2022	—N/a
Minister of Public Order and Safety	Hussein Muñoz	February 26, 2019	—N/a
Minister of Public Works	Eduard Guerra	November 11, 2019	—N/a
Minister of Science and Technology	Jehan Usop (Acting)		—N/a
Minister of Social Services	Raissa Jajurie	February 26, 2019	—N/a
Minister of Trade, Investment, and Tourism	Abuamri Taddik	June 10, 2019	August 5, 2025
Minister of Trade, Investment, and Tourism	Farserina Mohammad	August 5, 2025	—N/a
Minister of Transportation and Communications	Paisalin Tago	September 23, 2022	June 2025
Minister of Transportation and Communications	Termizie Masahud	August 8, 2025	—N/a
