= Bangsamoro Cabinet =

Cabinet of Bangsamoro
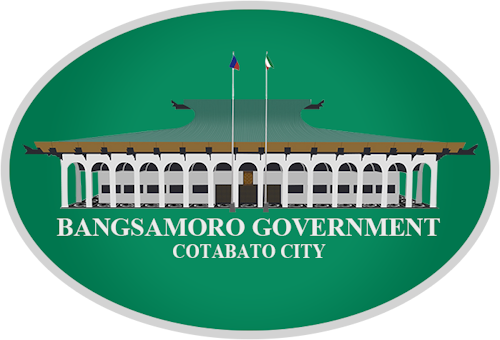

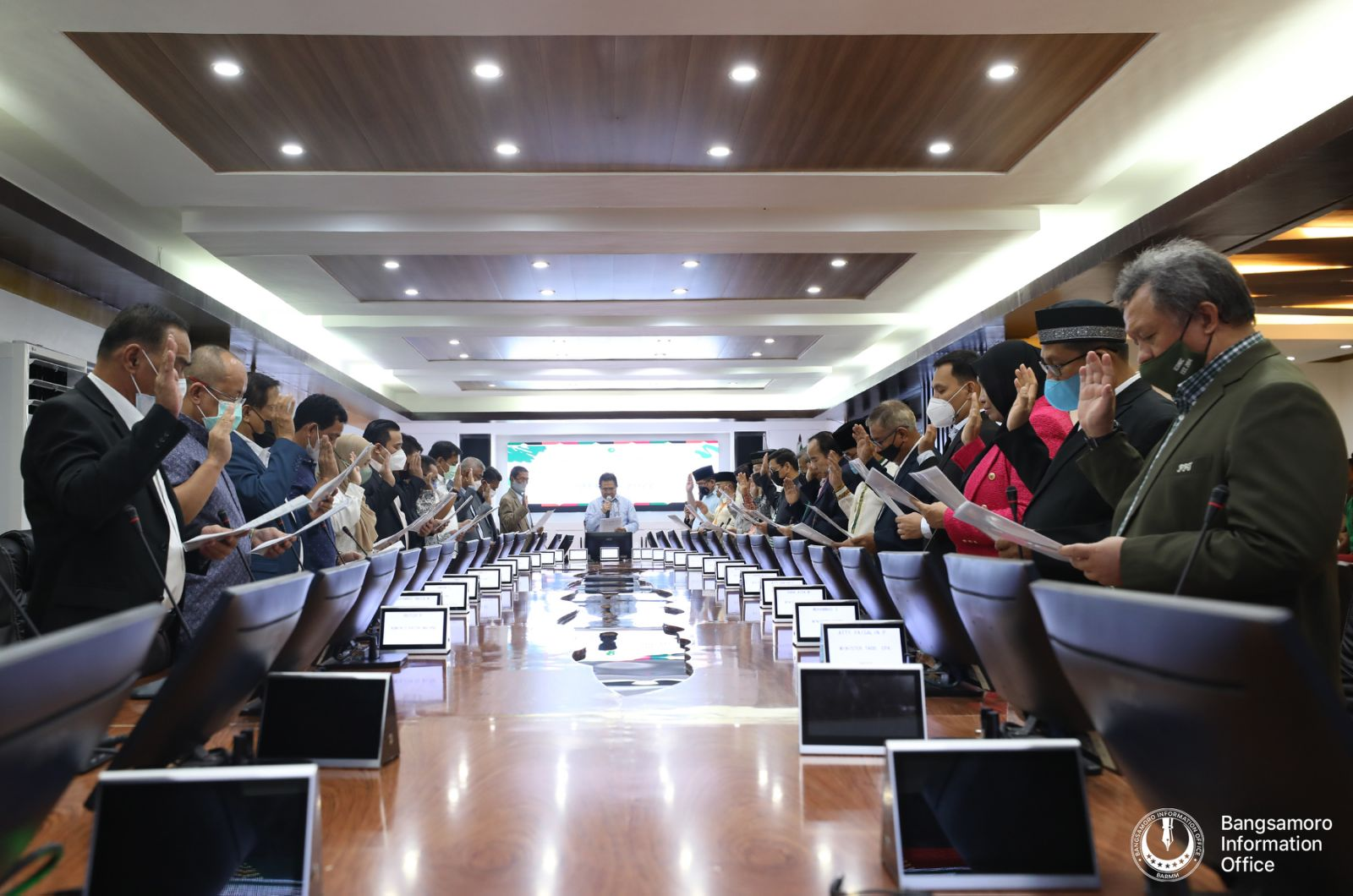
- Badjau Hall at the Bangsamoro Government Center

Cabinet overview
- Formed: February 2019 (7 years ago)
- Type: Advisory body
- Cabinet executive: Abdulraof Macacua, Chief Minister
- Key document: Bangsamoro Organic Law

The Bangsamoro Cabinet is part of the local government of the Bangsamoro Autonomous Region in Muslim Mindanao of the Philippines. It is currently led by Chief Minister Abdulraof Macacua. The first chief minister, Murad Ebrahim, made his first set of appointments to the cabinet in February 2019 during the official turnover of the former Autonomous Region in Muslim Mindanao to the succeeding Bangsamoro regional government.

Under the Bangsamoro Organic Law, there shall be at least one female member of the Cabinet.

The interim cabinet was tasked with drafting the eight government codes of the Bangsamoro.

== Cabinet officials ==
=== Ministers of Bangsamoro ===
Ministry	Acronym	Office	Incumbent	in Office since
Chief Minister	OCM	Chief Minister	Abdulraof Macacua	March 12, 2025
Chief Minister	OCM	Deputy Chief Minister for North Central Mindanao	Mamintal Adiong III	October 30, 2026
Chief Minister	OCM	Deputy Chief Minister for South Western Mindanao	Hadjimar Matba	October 30, 2026
Office of the Senior Minister	OSM	Senior Minister	Abunawas Maslamama	April 17, 2023
Office of the Cabinet Secretary	OCS	Cabinet Secretary	Abdullah Cusain	November 5, 2026
Bangsamoro Attorney General's Office	BAGO	Attorney General	Duque Kadatuan	November 5, 2026
Ministry of Agriculture, Fisheries and Agrarian Reform	MAFAR	Minister of Agriculture, Fisheries and Agrarian Reform	Ishak Mastura	November 5, 2026
Ministry of Basic, Higher and Technical Education	MBHTE	Minister of Basic, Higher and Technical Education	Naguib Sinarimbo	November 5, 2026
Ministry of Environment, Natural Resources and Energy	MENRE	Minister of Environment, Natural Resources and Energy	Akmad Brahim	March 14, 2022 (Note: In February 8, 2022, ministers' predecessors were directed to tender courtesy resignation as part of a cabinet reshuffle. The successors took their oath on March 14, 2022 but the Bangsamoro Information Office notes that these officials assumed offices weeks ago from that date.)
Ministry of Finance, and Budget and Management	MFBM	Minister of Finance, and Budget and Management	Ubaida Pacasem	March 14, 2022
Ministry of Health	MOH	Minister of Health	Jay Hataman Salliman	November 5, 2026
Ministry of Human Settlements and Development	MHSD	Minister of Human Settlements and Development	Rashdi Adiong	November 5, 2026
Ministry of Indigenous Peoples' Affairs	MIPA	Minister of Indigenous Peoples' Affairs	Jo Genna Jover	November 5, 2026
Ministry of Labor and Employment	MOLE	Minister of Labor and Employment	Kitem Kadatuan Jr.	November 5, 2026
Ministry of the Interior and Local Government	MILG/MLG	Minister of Local Government	Jordan Bayam	November 5, 2026
Ministry of Public Order and Safety	MPOS	Minister of Public Order and Safety	Jomar Midtimbang	November 5, 2026
Ministry of Public Works	MPW	Minister of Public Works	Basir Ibrahim	November 5, 2026
Ministry of Science and Technology	MOST	Minister of Science and Technology	Hanie Bud	November 5, 2026
Ministry of Social Services and Development	MSS	Minister of Social Services	Alirakim Munder	November 5, 2026
Ministry of Trade, Investment and Tourism	MTIT	Minister of Trade, Investment and Tourism	Faizal Padate	November 5, 2026
Ministry of Transportation and Communications	MOTC	Minister of Transportation and Communications	Termizie Masahud	August 8, 2025
