= Maguindanao del Norte Provincial Board =

Legislative body of the province of Maguindanao del Norte, Philippines

Maguindanao del Norte Provincial Board Sangguniang Panlalawigan ng Maguindanao del Norte

Type
- Type: Unicameral
- Term limits: 3 terms (9 years)

Leadership
- Presiding Officer: Datu Marshall I. Sinsuat, UBJP since June 30, 2025

Structure
- Seats: 13 board members 1 ex officio presiding officer
- Political groups: UBJP (4) PFP (3) Lakas (1) Vacant (1) Nonpartisan (3)
- Length of term: 3 years
- Authority: Local Government Code of the Philippines

Elections
- Voting system: Multiple non-transferable vote (regular members); Indirect election (ex officio members); Acclamation (sectoral member)
- Last election: May 12, 2025
- Next election: May 15, 2028

Meeting place
- Old Maguindanao Capitol, Sultan Kudarat, Maguindanao del Norte

The Maguindanao del Norte Provincial Board is the Sangguniang Panlalawigan (provincial legislature) of the Philippine province of Maguindanao del Norte.

The members are elected via plurality-at-large voting: the province is divided into two districts, each having four seats. A voter votes up to four names, with the top four candidates per district being elected. The vice governor is the ex officio presiding officer, and only votes to break ties. The vice governor is elected via the plurality voting system province-wide.

The districts used in appropriation of members is not coextensive with the legislative district of Maguindanao del Norte; unlike congressional representation which is at-large, Maguindanao del Norte is divided into two districts for representation in the Sangguniang Panlalawigan.

Aside from the regular members, the board also includes the provincial federation presidents of the Liga ng mga Barangay (ABC, from its old name "Association of Barangay Captains"), the Sangguniang Kabataan (SK, youth councils), the Philippine Councilors League (PCL), and the indigenous people representation.

The board was formed when the Maguindanao divided itself into two provinces on September 18, 2022 after a successful plebiscite on previous day.

== Apportionment ==
Elections	Seats per district		Ex officio seats	Reserved seats	Total seats
Elections	1st	2nd	Ex officio seats	Reserved seats	Total seats
2025–present	4	4	3	1	12

== List of members ==
=== Current members ===
These are the members after the 2025 local elections and 2023 barangay and SK elections:

- Vice Governor: Datu Marshall I. Sinsuat (UBJP)

Seat	Board member	Party	Start of term	End of term
1st district	Mashur A. Biruar	PFP	June 30, 2025	June 30, 2028
1st district	Sowaib I. Ibay	Lakas	June 30, 2025	June 30, 2028
1st district	Darwin M. Panga	PFP	June 30, 2025	June 30, 2028
1st district	Alexa Ashley P. Tomawis	UBJP	June 30, 2025	June 30, 2028
2nd district	Bai Lannie D. Diocolano	UBJP	June 30, 2025	June 30, 2028
2nd district	Michael A. Kida	UBJP	June 30, 2025	June 30, 2028
2nd district	Datu Ali G. Bayam	UBJP	June 30, 2025	June 30, 2028
2nd district	Babydatu Sinsuat	PFP	June 30, 2025	June 30, 2028
ABC				
PCL				
SK				
IPMR				

=== Vice Governor ===
Election year	Name	Party	Ref.
2025	Datu Marshall I. Sinsuat	UBJP	

=== 1st District ===
- Municipalities: Barira, Buldon, Matanog, Parang, Sultan Kudarat, Sultan Mastura
- Population (2024):

Election year	Member (party)	Member (party)	Member (party)	Member (party)
2025	Mashur A. Biruar (PFP)	Sowaib I. Ibay (Lakas)	Darwin M. Panga (PFP)	Alexa Ashley P. Tomawis (UBJP)

=== 2nd District ===
- Municipalities: Datu Blah T. Sinsuat, Datu Odin Sinsuat, Kabuntalan, Northern Kabuntalan, Talitay, Upi
- Population (2024):

Election year	Member (party)	Member (party)	Member (party)	Member (party)
2025	Bai Lannie D. Diocolano (UBJP)	Michael A. Kida (UBJP)	Datu Ali G. Bayam (UBJP)	Babydatu Sinsuat (PFP)
