= Senior Minister =

Senior Minister is a political title. It may refer to:

- Senior Minister of Bangsamoro, a political office in the Cabinet of Bangsamoro
- Senior Minister of Canada, a political office in the Cabinet of Canada
  - Senior Minister, a ceremonial position before the title Deputy Prime Minister was introduced in 1977
- Senior Minister of Malaysia, a political office in the Cabinet of Malaysia
- Senior Minister of Punjab (Pakistan), a political office in the Government of Punjab
- Senior Minister of Singapore, a political office in the Cabinet of Singapore

== See also ==
- Minister of Seniors
