= Melanio Ulama =

Filipino politician in Bangsamoro

Timuay Melanio Ulama
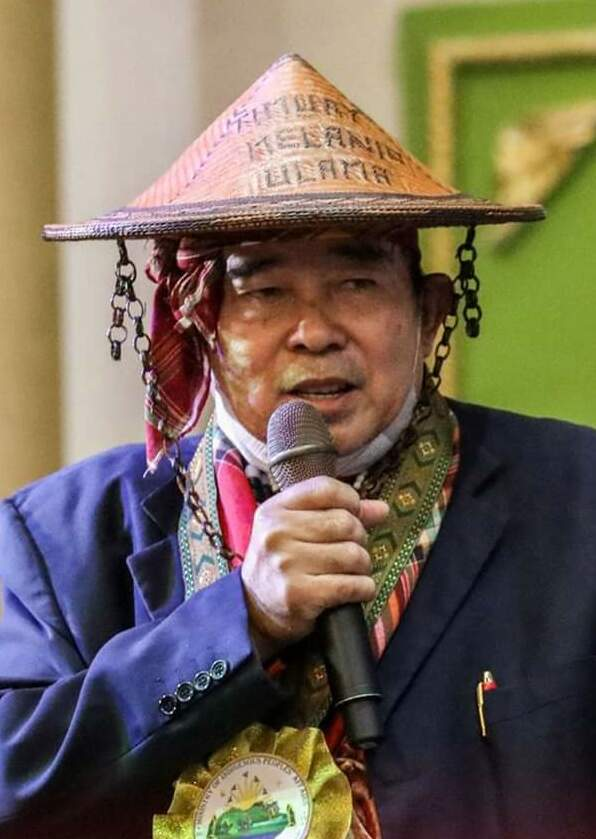

Member of the Bangsamoro Transition Authority Parliament
- In office 29 March 2019 – 15 September 2022
- Appointed by: Rodrigo Duterte
- Chief Minister: Murad Ebrahim

Bangsamoro Minister of Indigenous Peoples' Affairs
- Incumbent
- Assumed office 26 February 2019

Personal details
- Born: Datu Piang, Philippines
- Citizenship: Filipino
- Spouse: Elsie Capillo Grajido-Ulama
- Children: 2
- Occupation: Ancestral leader, politician

Timuay Melanio Umbit Ulama is a Filipino politician, ancestral leader, and peace advocate who serves as the Indigenous Peoples' Affairs Minister of Bangsamoro and a member of the Bangsamoro Transition Authority Parliament.

== Early life and education ==
A member of the Teduray ethnic group and a native of Upi, Maguindanao del Norte, Melanio Umbit Ulama was born in Kabenge, Datu Piang, Maguindanao (now part of Maguindanao del Sur) to Diwan Mamintal Ulama and Lucia Umbit Ulama. He attended Upi Agricultural School for his collegiate studies where he obtained a bachelor's degree in agriculture, majoring in agronomy in 1982. He pursued a master's degree in public administration at the Notre Dame University in Cotabato City.

== Career ==
Ulama is a leader of the non-Moro indigenous people (IP) community and was involved in several peace organizations in Mindanao. He holds the traditional title of Timuay and represents the Teduray. He also served as the IP consultant for the former secessionist group Moro Islamic Liberation Front (MILF) and the leader of the Teduray and Lambangian Conference. He was also a member of the Chairman of Mindanao Peoples Caucus, a peace organization which consist of IP, Bangsamoro, and Christian communities in Mindanao. Ulama was also a former chairman of the Organization of Tribal Leaders Associations Conference and of Mindanao Action for Peace and Development and a former Vice Chairman of the Kadtuntaya Foundation. From 2003 to 2013, Ulama worked with the Office of Southern Cultural Communities Autonomous Region in Muslim Mindanao (OSCC-ARMM).

He is also a two-time member of the Bangsamoro Transition Commission, which helped formed the draft of a bill, which eventually became the Bangsamoro Organic Law and vote the passage of resolution 38 aims to cease and desist order the claims of his fellow tribes resulting displacement of the indigenous cultural communities and violation of basic rights of the NMIP in the region, with the MILF endorsing his appointment to the government body on both occasions.

Ulama became part of the Bangsamoro Transition Authority Parliament, the interim legislature of the Bangsamoro autonomous region formed in 2019 and was appointed as the first minister of the Ministry of Indigenous Peoples' Affairs on February 26, 2019, by interim Bangsamoro Chief Minister Murad Ebrahim.

Ulama's tenure ended when he was not reappointed by President Bongbong Marcos to the interim parliament in August 2022.

Chief Minister Abdulraof Macacua ordered Bangsamoro officials including Ulama to tender courtesy resignation on June 23, 2025. On August 1, 2025, Guiamal Abdulrahman was appointed to head the Ministry of Indigenous Peoples' Affairs.

== Personal life ==
Melanio Ulama was married to Elsie Capillo Grajido, a school teacher, with whom he has two daughters who grew up to be nurses who cannot speak Teduray .
