= Maguindanao del Norte's 3rd parliamentary district =

Parliamentary district for the Bangsamoro Parliament

- Constituency for the Bangsamoro Parliament
- Boundary of Maguindanao del Norte's 3rd parliamentary district in Maguindanao del Norte
- Province: Maguindanao del Norte
- Population: 113,847 (2024)
- Electorate: 58,428 (2026)

Current constituency
- Member of Parliament: Abdulraof Macacua (elect)
- Political party: BFP

Maguindanao del Norte's 3rd parliamentary district is the third of the five parliamentary districts of the province of Maguindanao del Norte for the Bangsamoro Parliament. It is composed of barangays Poblacion I and Poblacion VII in Cotabato City; the municipalities of Kabuntalan, Northern Kabuntalan, and Talitay in Maguindanao del Norte; and the barangays of Bulibod, Kabuntalan, Kapimpilan, Katamlangan, and Nalinan in Sultan Kudarat, Maguindanao del Norte.

Interim chief minister Abdulraof Macacua of the Bangsamoro Federalist Party is the member of Parliament-elect for the district following the inaugural 2026 Bangsamoro Parliament election. He will assume office on October 30, 2026.

== List of MPs representing the district ==
No.	Portrait	Member (Lifespan)	Term of office	Party	Parliament	Electoral history	Constituencies
1		Abdulraof Macacua (born 1957)	Assuming office on October 30, 2026	BFP (Note: Abdulraof Macacua is a member of the Bangsamoro Federalist Party who ran in 2026 as an independent.)	1st Parliament	Elected in 2026.	2026–present Barangays of Cotabato City: Poblacion I, Poblacion VII Municipalities of Maguindanao del Norte: Kabuntalan, Northern Kabuntalan, Talitay Barangays of Sultan Kudarat, Maguindanao del Norte: Bulibod, Kabuntalan, Kapimpilan, Katamlangan, Nalinan

== Election results ==
=== 2026 ===
2026 Bangsamoro Parliament election in Maguindanao del Norte
Party	Candidate	Votes	%
Independent	Abdulraof Macacua	37,483	79.27
Independent	Badrudin Mamad	9,801	20.73
Total votes		47,284	100.00
Independent win (new seat)			
