= Talitay =

Municipality in Maguindanao del Norte, Philippines

Talitay Sultan Sumagka
- Municipality
- Municipality of Talitay
- Map of Maguindanao del Norte with Talitay highlighted
- Interactive map of Talitay
- Location within the Philippines
- Coordinates: 7°02′07″N 124°22′33″E
- Country: Philippines
- Region: Bangsamoro Autonomous Region in Muslim Mindanao
- Province: Maguindanao del Norte
- House district: Lone district
- Parliamentary district: 3rd district
- Founded: June 26, 1999
- Barangays: 9 (see Barangays)

Government
  - Type: Sangguniang Bayan
  - Mayor: Sidik S. Amiril
  - Vice Mayor: Fahad J. Midtimbang
  - House Representative: Sittie Shahara "Dimple" I. Mastura
  - Municipal Council: Members: Badrudin M. Manan; Kamid L. Buisan; Akas A. Ameril; Akmad D. Guiamadil; Akmad W. Masulot; Kalikod T. Sally; Norhaida S. Kam; Remy H. Gali
  - Electorate: 16,999 voters (2025)

Area
  - Total: 62.96 km^{2} (24.31 sq mi)
- Elevation: 10 m (33 ft)
- Highest elevation: 52 m (171 ft)
- Lowest elevation: 0 m (0 ft)

Population (2024 census)
  - Total: 19,750
  - Density: 313.7/km^{2} (812.5/sq mi)
  - Households: 2,896

Economy
  - Income class: 4th municipal income class
  - Poverty incidence: 59.45% (2023)
  - Revenue: ₱ 102.5 million (2024)
  - Assets: ₱ 133 million (2024)
  - Expenditure: ₱ 99.59 million (2024)
  - Liabilities: ₱ 86.53 million (2024)

Service provider
  - Electricity: Maguindanao Electric Cooperative (MAGELCO)
- Time zone: UTC+8 (PST)
- ZIP code: 9612
- PSGC: 1903821000
- IDD : area code: +63 (0)64
- Native languages: Maguindanao; Tagalog

Talitay, officially the Municipality of Talitay (Maguindanaon: Inged nu Talitay; Iranun: Inged a Talitay; Tagalog: Bayan ng Talitay), is a municipality in the province of Maguindanao del Norte, Philippines. According to the 2024 census, it has a population of 19,750 people, making it the least populated municipality in the province.

== History ==
On July 1, 1996, during the fourth regular session of the second regional assembly of the Autonomous Region in Muslim Mindanao, the regional legislature created the municipality of Talitay under Muslim Mindanao Autonomy Act No. 52 which was approved in a plebescite on June 26, 1999. The town was carved out of the municipality of Talayan. The ARMM law creating the municipality provides that its administrative center shall be established in barangay Talitay.

On April 15, 2008, during the third regular session of the fifth assembly of the regional legislature, it was then renamed into Sultan Sumagka through the enactment of Muslim Mindanao Autonomy Act No. 228. However no record of a plebiscite was held to affirm the renaming.

On March 22, 2021, the town was placed under a state of calamity due to family feud (rido) between the former mayor Montasir Sabal and Watamama-Amiril families, belonging to the MILF. The former mayor offered his resignation as a result of prolonged fight between the two sides. The Maguindanao provincial government installed a care-taker for the municipality, resulting in a controversy with the MILG, considering that by law of succession of the Local Government Code, Moner Sabal should be the successor.

On June 17, 2021, the former mayor Montasir Sabal was killed while under police custody after his arrest in the Port of Batangas.

When the Maguindanao province was divided into Maguindanao del Sur and Maguindanao del Norte after the September 2022 division plebiscite, Talitay became part of the latter province.

== Geography ==
=== Barangays ===
Talitay is politically subdivided into 9 barangays. Each barangay consists of puroks while some have sitios.

- Bintan (Bentan)
- Gadungan
- Kiladap
- Kilalan
- Kuden
- Makadayon
- Manggay
- Pageda
- Talitay Proper

=== Climate ===
Climate data for Talitay, Maguindanao del Norte
Month	Jan	Feb	Mar	Apr	May	Jun	Jul	Aug	Sep	Oct	Nov	Dec	Year
Mean daily maximum °C (°F)	31 (88)	32 (90)	32 (90)	32 (90)	31 (88)	29 (84)	29 (84)	29 (84)	30 (86)	30 (86)	30 (86)	31 (88)	31 (87)
Mean daily minimum °C (°F)	21 (70)	21 (70)	21 (70)	23 (73)	23 (73)	23 (73)	23 (73)	23 (73)	23 (73)	23 (73)	23 (73)	22 (72)	22 (72)
Average precipitation mm (inches)	30 (1.2)	19 (0.7)	25 (1.0)	24 (0.9)	64 (2.5)	88 (3.5)	102 (4.0)	105 (4.1)	76 (3.0)	82 (3.2)	60 (2.4)	26 (1.0)	701 (27.5)
Average rainy days	9.8	8.5	11.3	11.9	21.6	23.9	24.1	24.5	20.9	21.8	16.8	11.8	206.9
Source: Meteoblue (modeled/calculated data, not measured locally)

== Demographics ==
Population census of Talitay
Year	Pop.	±% p.a.
2000	17,026	—
2007	21,964	+3.57%
2010	13,328	−16.62%
2015	14,863	+2.10%
2020	17,463	+3.45%
2024	19,750	+3.00%
Source: Philippine Statistics Authority

== Economy ==
Poverty Incidence of Talitay

Source: Philippine Statistics Authority
