= Naguib Sinarimbo =

Filipino lawyer and politician

- Official portrait, 2026

Member of the Bangsamoro Parliament for Cotabato City's 2nd parliamentary district
- Incumbent
- Assumed office October 30, 2026
- Preceded by: Office established

Member of the Bangsamoro Transition Authority Parliament
- In office September 15, 2022 – October 30, 2026
- Nominated by: Philippine national government
- Appointed by: Bongbong Marcos
- Succeeded by: Office disestablished
Ministerial offices
Minister of Basic, Higher and Technical Education
Incumbent
Assumed office November 5, 2026
Chief Minister	Abdulraof Macacua
Preceded by	Abdulraof Macacua
Minister of the Interior and Local Government
In office February 26, 2019 – December 6, 2023
Chief Minister	Murad Ebrahim
Preceded by	Office established
Succeeded by	Sha Elijah Dumama-Alba

Personal details
- Born: Naguib Gani Sinarimbo; January 31, 1972 (age 54)
- Citizenship: Filipino
- Party: BFP (2026-present); SIAP (2024–2026); UBJP (2014–2024)
- Profession: Lawyer

Naguib Gani Sinarimbo (born January 31, 1972) is a Filipino lawyer and politician who served as the Local Government Minister of Bangsamoro.

== Career ==
=== Early years ===
Prior to the establishment of the Bangsamoro region, Sinarimbo served as consultant and resource person for the Philippine national government, armed non-state organizations, and non-governmental organizations. He was part of the Legal and Technical Working Group of the MILF Peace Panel which was involved in Philippine national government's peace negotiations with the Moro Islamic Liberation Front (MILF). He also aided in the creation of a draft for the Bangsamoro Organic Law as well as the transition of the MILF into a non-armed advocacy group through helping them setting up the United Bangsamoro Justice Party (UBJP). Sinarimbo became the party's secretary general.

=== Interior Minister ===
Sinarimbo was appointed as the first minister of the Ministry of the Interior and Local Government on February 26, 2019, by interim Bangsamoro Chief Minister Murad Ebrahim. As local government minister, he has overseen the putting up of municipal government buildings and police stations in various towns in the region. He is also involved in organizing Bangsamoro's Rapid Emergency Action on Disaster Incidence. He resigned on December 6, 2023. Sinarimbo was succeeded by Sha Elijah Dumama-Alba on the following day.

=== SIAP ===
In April 2024, Sinarimbo joined the Serbisyong Inklusibo–Alyansang Progresibo (SIAP) political party. He was believed to have been targeted in a grenade throwing incident on his cafe in Cotabato City in August 2024. As the lead organizer for SIAP against the UBJP, Sinarimbo had a feud with Mayor Bruce Matabalao.

=== Bangsamoro Transition Authority Parliament (2025–2026) ===
In March 2025, Sinarimbo was appointed to the Bangsamoro Transition Authority and regional parliament by President Bongbong Marcos.

Sometime in 2026, Sinarimbo joined the BFP and became the president of the party's Cotabato City chapter. He has reconciled with Mayor Matabalao when the latter also joined the former's party.

=== Bangsamoro Parliament (2026–present) ===
Sinarimbo ran for a seat in the 2026 Bangsamoro Parliament election as a representative for Cotabato City under the BFP. He was elected with 77.91% of the vote against Zahrumin Andong Midtimbang.

On November 5, 2026, newly re-elected Chief Minister Abdulraof Macacua named Sinarimbo as part of his new cabinet. He was tasked to head the Ministry of Basic, Higher and Technical Education.

== Personal life ==
Sinarimbo is married to Rosslaini Alonto, the director-general of the Bangsamoro Ministry of Trade, Investments and Tourism.
