= Sha Elijah Dumama-Alba =

Filipino lawyer (born 1981/2)

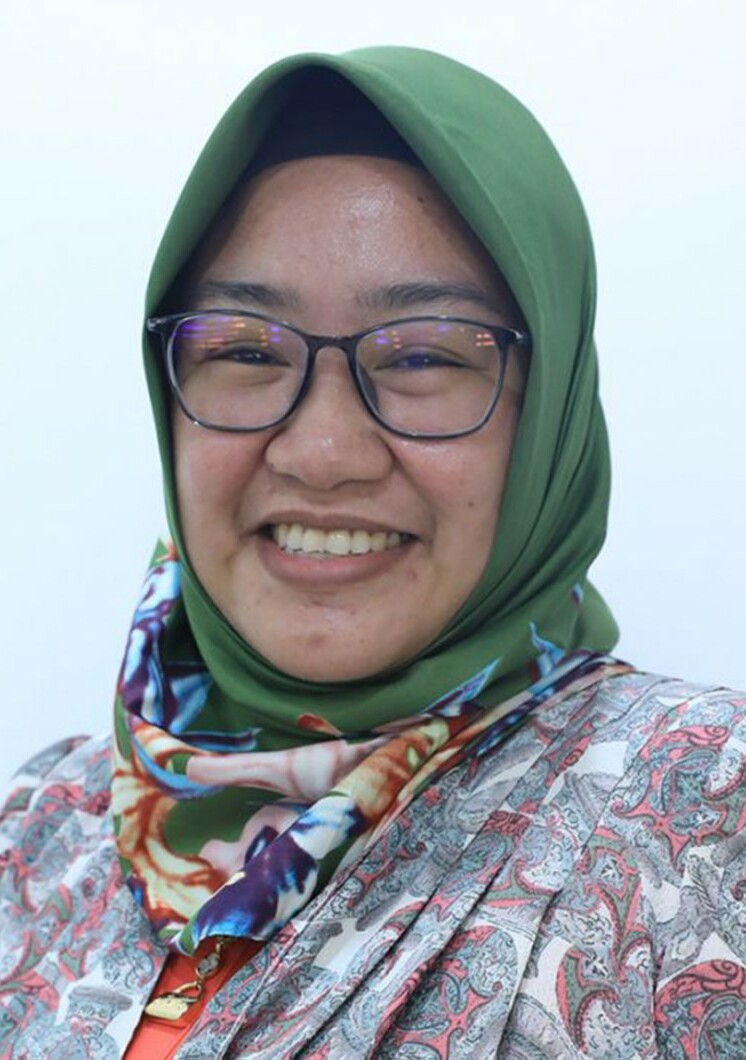

Bangsamoro Minister of the Interior and Local Government
- In office December 7, 2023 – July 21, 2025
- Preceded by: Naguib Sinarimbo
- Succeeded by: Abdulraof Macacua

Floor Leader of the Bangsamoro Transition Authority Parliament
- In office September 20, 2022 – October 21, 2025
- Chief Minister: Murad Ebrahim
- Preceded by: Office established
- Succeeded by: John Anthony Lim

Attorney General of Bangsamoro
- Incumbent
- Assumed office February 2019
- Chief Minister: Murad Ebrahim
- Preceded by: Office established

Majority Leader of the Bangsamoro Transition Authority Parliament
- In office September 15, 2022 – September 20, 2022
- Chief Minister: Murad Ebrahim
- Preceded by: Lanang Ali Jr.
- Succeeded by: Office abolished

Member of the Bangsamoro Transition Authority Parliament
- Incumbent
- Assumed office September 15, 2022
- Nominated by: Moro Islamic Liberation Front
- Appointed by: Bongbong Marcos
- Chief Minister: Murad Ebrahim

Personal details
- Born: Sha Elijah Biruar Dumama; 1981 or 1982 (age 44–45)
- Profession: Lawyer

Sha Elijah Biruar Dumama-Alba (born 1981 or 1982) is a Moro Filipino lawyer who is a member of the Bangsamoro Transition Authority Parliament.

== Early life and education ==
Dumama-Alba was born to parents who are both doctors and government workers and grew up in Cotabato City. She attended the University of the Philippines (UP) for her college education. Following her family's tradition, she initially pursued a preparatory medical course, but shifted to pursuing a law degree on her third year of university. She pursued a bachelor's degree in public administration in UP and studied law at the San Beda College.

== Career ==
While pursuing a law degree at San Beda, Dumama-Alba worked at the Department of Agrarian Reform-Office for Foreign Assisted Projects. After passing the Philippine Bar Examination in 2007, she joined Buñag & Uy Law Offices which specializes in taxation, corporate, and labor laws. Dumama-Alba served as attorney at the Civil Service Commission-Autonomous Region in Muslim Mindanao. In 2013, she was appointed as legal consultant to the Bangsamoro Transition Commission.

She took the Special Shariah Bar Examinations in 2018, where she placed third.

When Bangsamoro was created in 2019, Dumama-Alba was appointed as Attorney General of the autonomous region under the cabinet of interim Chief Minister Murad Ebrahim.

Dumama-Alba would be appointed to the Bangsamoro Transition Authority on August 12, 2022 by President Bongbong Marcos and consequentially the Bangsamoro Parliament. She was a nominee of the Moro Islamic Liberation Front. She was named majority leader of the legislature during the inaugural session of its second interim meeting on September 15, 2022. The position would be discontinued on September 20, 2022 and she was designated as floor leader instead.

Dumama-Alba tendered her courtesy resignation to comply with a cabinet reshuffle process by Chief Minister Abdulraof Macacua. On July 21, 2025, her resignation was accepted. Macacua took over her portfolio on the following day.

On October 21, 2025, John Anthony Lim of Tawi-Tawi was elected as Dumama-Alba's successor as Floor Leader.
