= Northern Kabuntalan =

Municipality in Maguindanao del Norte, Philippines

Northern Kabuntalan اتار كبنتالن
- Municipality
- Municipality of Northern Kabuntalan
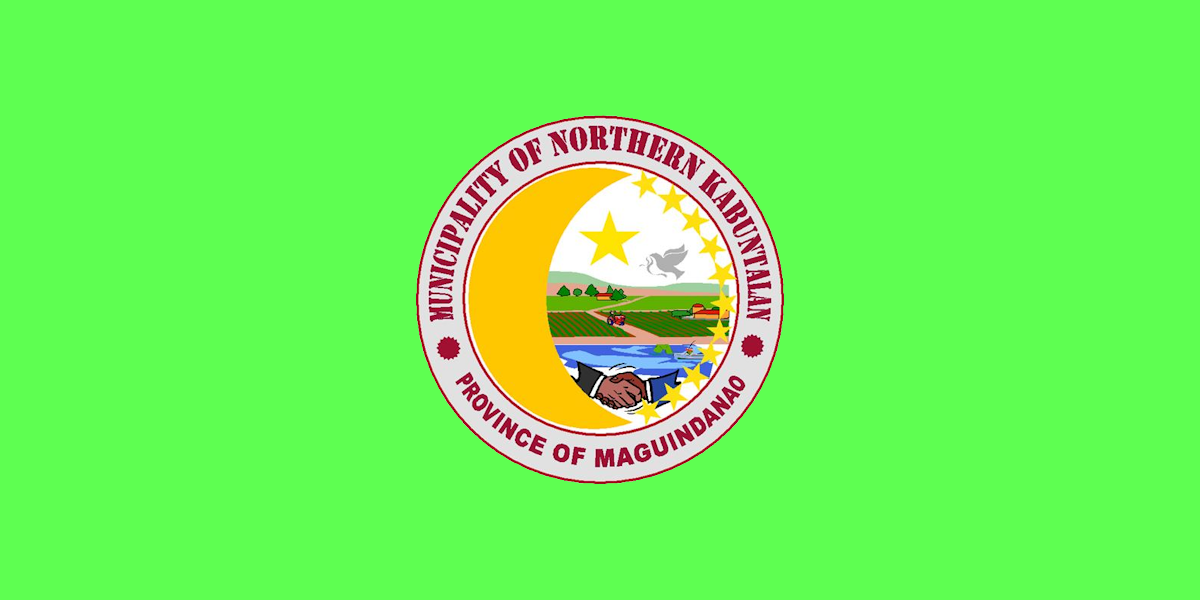
- Flag Seal

- Map of Maguindanao del Norte with Northern Kabuntalan highlighted
- Interactive map of Northern Kabuntalan
- Location within the Philippines
- Coordinates: 7°12′06″N 124°28′29″E
- Country: Philippines
- Region: Bangsamoro Autonomous Region in Muslim Mindanao
- Province: Maguindanao del Norte
- House district: Lone district
- Parliamentary district: 3rd district
- Founded: December 30, 2006
- Barangays: 11 (see Barangays)

Government
  - Type: Sangguniang Bayan
  - Mayor: Datu Umbra B. Dilangalen
  - Vice Mayor: Datu Mohammad Shaffie C. Bayam
  - House Representative: Sittie Shahara "Dimple" I. Mastura
  - Municipal Council: Members: Mohammad Haron A. Abpi; Nasser T. Pananggalan; Faisal G. Pendi; Khominie S. Bayam; Datu Ali G. Bayam; Datu Racken A. Dilangalen; Hassan M. Wahab; Yatiem A. Ibrahim
  - Electorate: 12,951 voters (2025)

Area
  - Total: 106.77 km^{2} (41.22 sq mi)
- Elevation: 10 m (33 ft)
- Highest elevation: 38 m (125 ft)
- Lowest elevation: 0 m (0 ft)

Population (2024 census)
  - Total: 30,332
  - Density: 284.09/km^{2} (735.78/sq mi)
  - Households: 4,448

Economy
  - Income class: 4th municipal income class
  - Poverty incidence: 44.23% (2023)
  - Revenue: ₱ 143.9 million (2024)
  - Assets: ₱ 229.7 million (2024)
  - Expenditure: ₱ 132 million (2024)
  - Liabilities: ₱ 90.23 million (2024)

Service provider
  - Electricity: Maguindanao Electric Cooperative (MAGELCO)
- Time zone: UTC+8 (PST)
- ZIP code: 9606
- PSGC: 1903834000
- IDD : area code: +63 (0)64
- Native languages: Maguindanao; Ilianen; Tagalog

Northern Kabuntalan, officially the Municipality of Northern Kabuntalan (Maguindanaon: Inged nu Utara Kabuntalan; Tagalog: Bayan ng Hilagang Kabuntalan), is a municipality in the province of Maguindanao del Norte, Philippines. According to the 2024 census, it had a population of 30,332.

During the second regular session of the first legislative assembly of the Autonomous Region in Muslim Mindanao, the regional legislature created Northern Kabuntalan out of 11 barangays of Kabuntalan, by virtue of Muslim Mindanao Autonomy Act No. 206, which was subsequently ratified in a plebiscite held on December 30, 2006. The town was part of the province of Shariff Kabunsuan until its nullification by the Supreme Court in July 2008.

The ARMM law creating the municipality provides that its administrative center shall be established in barangay Tumaguinting.

== Geography ==
=== Barangays ===
Northern Kabuntalan is politically subdivided into 11 barangays. Each barangay consists of puroks while some have sitios.

- Balong
- Damatog (Poblacion)
- Gayonga
- Guiawa
- Indatuan
- Kapimpilan
- Libungan
- Montay
- Paulino Labio
- Sabaken
- Tumaguinting

=== Climate ===
Climate data for Northern Kabuntalan, Maguindanao del Norte
Month	Jan	Feb	Mar	Apr	May	Jun	Jul	Aug	Sep	Oct	Nov	Dec	Year
Mean daily maximum °C (°F)	32 (90)	32 (90)	33 (91)	33 (91)	31 (88)	30 (86)	30 (86)	30 (86)	31 (88)	31 (88)	31 (88)	31 (88)	31 (88)
Mean daily minimum °C (°F)	22 (72)	22 (72)	22 (72)	23 (73)	24 (75)	24 (75)	23 (73)	23 (73)	23 (73)	23 (73)	23 (73)	22 (72)	23 (73)
Average precipitation mm (inches)	38 (1.5)	24 (0.9)	29 (1.1)	31 (1.2)	50 (2.0)	56 (2.2)	52 (2.0)	49 (1.9)	39 (1.5)	47 (1.9)	54 (2.1)	35 (1.4)	504 (19.7)
Average rainy days	10.1	7.5	10.0	11.5	19.7	20.8	19.4	18.5	16.3	18.5	18.4	12.8	183.5
Source: Meteoblue (modeled/calculated data, not measured locally)

== Demographics ==
Population census of Northern Kabuntalan
Year	Pop.	±% p.a.
2007	22,170	—
2010	14,251	−14.86%
2015	25,232	+11.49%
2020	26,277	+0.86%
2024	30,332	+3.51%
Source: Philippine Statistics Authority

== Economy ==
Poverty Incidence of Northern Kabuntalan

Source: Philippine Statistics Authority
