= Senior Minister of Bangsamoro =

Member of cabinet of Bangsamoro regional government

- Seal of Bangsamoro
- Incumbent; Abunawas Maslamama since April 17, 2023
- Office of the Chief Minister
- Appointer: Chief Minister of Bangsamoro
- Term length: At the chief minister's pleasure
- Inaugural holder: Esmael Omar Pasigan
- Formation: 26 February 2019; 7 years ago

The senior minister is a member of the cabinet of the Bangsamoro regional government.

The senior minister also used to be called the executive secretary. The role is comparable to the Executive Secretary of the Philippine national government.

== List ==
No.	Image	Senior Minister	Took office	Left office	Chief Minister
1		Esmael Omar Pasigan	February 26, 2019	November 11, 2019	Murad Ebrahim
2		Abdulraof Macacua	November 11, 2019	April 5, 2023	Murad Ebrahim
3		Abunawas Maslamama	April 17, 2023	incumbent	Murad Ebrahim
