= Ministry of Agriculture, Fisheries and Agrarian Reform =

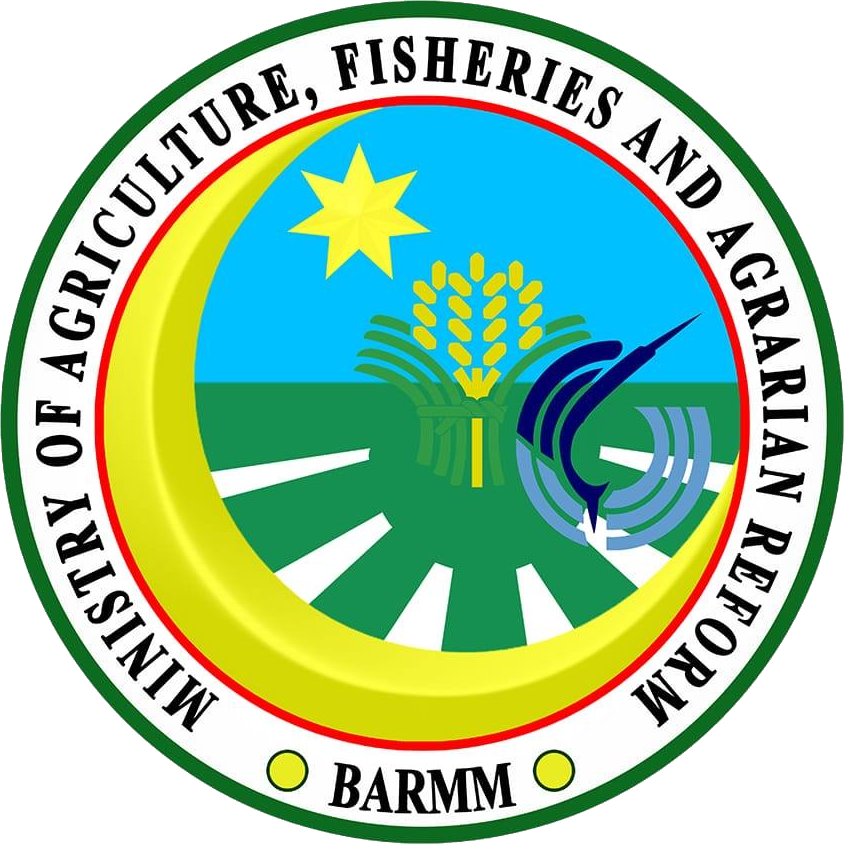

Agency overview
- Jurisdiction: Regional government of Bangsamoro
- Minister responsible: Abunawas Maslamama, Minister of Agriculture, Fisheries and Agrarian Reform
- Website: mafar.bangsamoro.gov.ph

The Ministry of Agriculture, Fisheries and Agrarian Reform (MAFAR) is the regional executive department of the Bangsamoro Autonomous Region in Muslim Mindanao (BARMM) responsible for affairs relating to agriculture, fishing, and agrarian reform in the region.

== History ==
The Ministry of Agriculture, Fisheries and Agrarian Reform (MAFAR) was formed by to manage three sectors in the Bangsamoro Autonomous Region in Muslim Mindanao (BARMM); agriculture, fisheries, and agrarian reform. On February 23, 2019, the first set of Bangsamoro regional government's ministers was appointed including Mohammad Yacob, who became the first agriculture, fisheries, and agrarian reform minister. By December 23, 2019, the functions of the national executive department, the Department of Agrarian Reform (DAR) was transferred to the MAFAR, except adjudicatory functions. The MAFAR and the DAR are set to form a regional agrarian reform adjudication board for Bangsamoro at a future date

== Ministers ==
#	Minister	Term began	Term ended	Chief Minister
1	Mohammad Yacob	February 26, 2019	April 14, 2025	Murad Ebrahim
2	Abunawas Maslamama	April 14, 2025	incumbent	Abdulraof Macacua
