= Ministry of Human Settlements and Development =

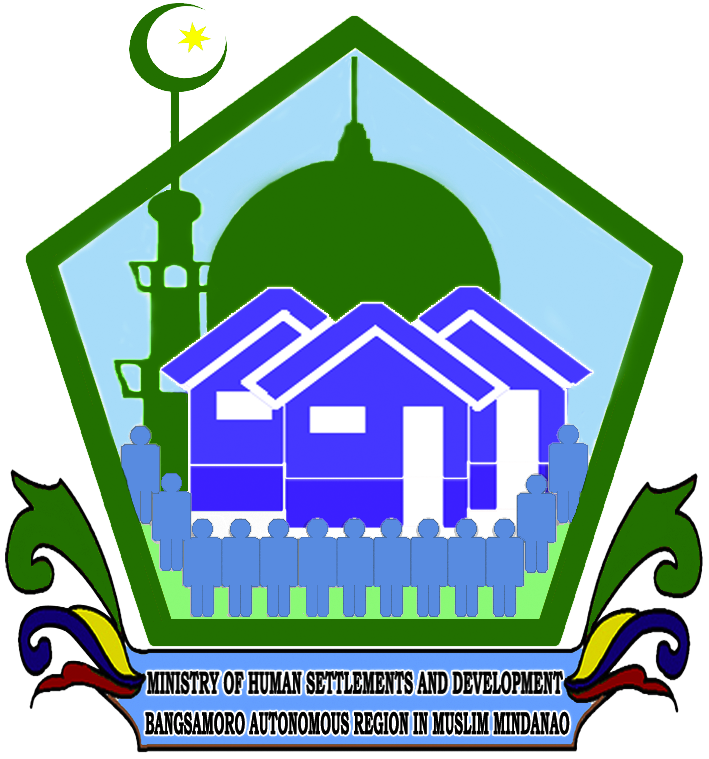

Agency overview
- Jurisdiction: Regional government of Bangsamoro
- Minister responsible: Vacant, Minister of Human Settlements and Development
- Website: mhsd.bangsamoro.gov.ph

The Ministry of Human Settlements and Development (MHSD) is the regional executive department of the Bangsamoro Autonomous Region in Muslim Mindanao (BARMM) responsible for management of housing and human settlement in the region as well as affairs relating to both rural and urban development.

The MHSD did not have a counterpart office from the Autonomous Region in Muslim Mindanao (ARMM), the predecessor autonomous region of Bangsamoro. Some of Bangsamoro's ministries were reorganized from the regional offices of national government bodies in the ARMM.

== Ministers ==
#	Minister	Term began	Term ended	Chief Minister
1	Hamid Aminoddin Barra	February 26, 2019	January 13, 2026	Murad Ebrahim
1	Hamid Aminoddin Barra	February 26, 2019	January 13, 2026	Abdulraof Macacua
