= Eduard Guerra =

Filipino architect and politician

- Official portrait, 2026

Bangsamoro Minister of Public Works
- Incumbent
- Assumed office November 11, 2019
- Chief Minister: Murad Ebrahim
- Preceded by: Murad Ebrahim

Bangsamoro Minister of Finance
- In office February 26, 2019 – November 11, 2019
- Preceded by: Position established
- Succeeded by: Murad Ebrahim

Member of the Bangsamoro Transition Authority Parliament
- Incumbent
- Assumed office 29 March 2019
- Nominated by: Moro Islamic Liberation Front
- Appointed by: Rodrigo Duterte
- Chief Minister: Murad Ebrahim

Military service
- Allegiance: Moro Islamic Liberation Front (MILF)

Eduard Uy Guerra is a Filipino architect and politician who is a current member of the Bangsamoro Transition Authority Parliament and the Bangsamoro Minister of Public Works.

== Career ==
=== Moro Islamic Liberation Front ===
Guerra was a member of the Moro Islamic Liberation Front (MILF) and adopted the nom-de-guerre "Abraham Yap Alonto". He served as a member of the MILF central committee. He also served as chairman of the MILF committee on foreign affairs and co-chair of the Joint Normalization Committee (JNT).

In September 2010, Guerra was arrested at Francisco Bangoy International Airport intending to fly to Geneva, Switzerland to attend a United Nations Human Rights Council meeting. He was implicated in the August 16, 2008 attack in Maasim after the Supreme Court nullified the memorandum of agreement on ancestral domain (MOA-AD) between the MILF and the government. He was accused of being a financier of the Jemaah Islamiyah jihadist group by the military. He was later released from detention.

=== Bangsamoro government ===
After the Bangsamoro autonomous region was established in 2019, Guerra became part of the MILF-led regional government. He was among the first set of members of appointed to the Bangsamoro Transition Authority Parliament in early 2019.

Guerra was appointed to head the Ministry of Finance, and Budget and Management by interim Chief Minister Murad Ebrahim in February 2019. In November 11, 2019, Guerra was reassigned to lead the Ministry of Public Works with Ebrahim taking over as finance minister.

Guerra was remained in the legislature when he was reappointed by President Bongbong Marcos on August 12, 2022.

== Personal life ==
An architect by profession, Eduard Guerra is married to Jocelyn Guerra.
