= Ubaida Pacasem =

Filipino politician and lawyer

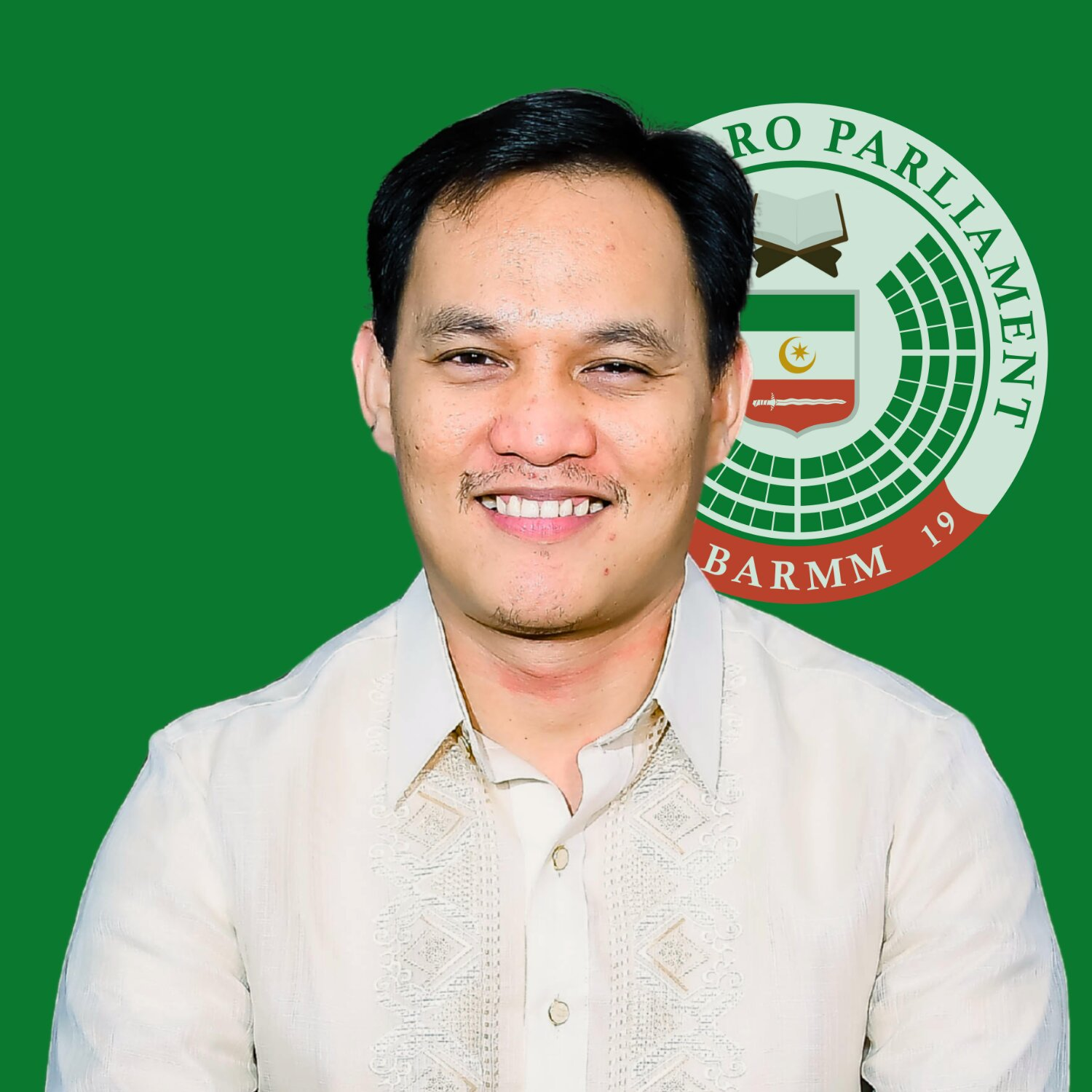
- Official portrait as MP

Bangsamoro Minister of Finance and Budget and Management
- Incumbent
- Assumed office 2022
- Chief Minister: Murad Ebrahim; Abdulraof Macacua
- Preceded by: Murad Ebrahim

Member of the Bangsamoro Transition Authority Parliament
- Incumbent
- Assumed office March 29, 2019
- Nominated by: Moro Islamic Liberation Front
- Appointed by: Rodrigo Duterte; Bongbong Marcos

Personal details
- Born: Ubaida C. Pacasem
- Education: Notre Dame University
- Occupation: Lawyer; Certified public accountant

Ubaida C. Pacasem is a Filipino politician, lawyer, and certified public accountant, currently serving as a member of the interim Bangsamoro Parliament since 2019.

He is also currently the Minister of Finance and Budget and Management of Bangsamoro since 2022 under the cabinets of Murad Ebrahim and Abdulraof Macacua.

Pacasem previously served as the Chief of the Legal Affairs Division of the National Commission on Muslim Filipinos Region XII-A, and as a legal researcher and consultant for the Senate of the Philippines during the creation of the Bangsamoro Organic Law.
