= Ministry of Science and Technology (Bangsamoro) =

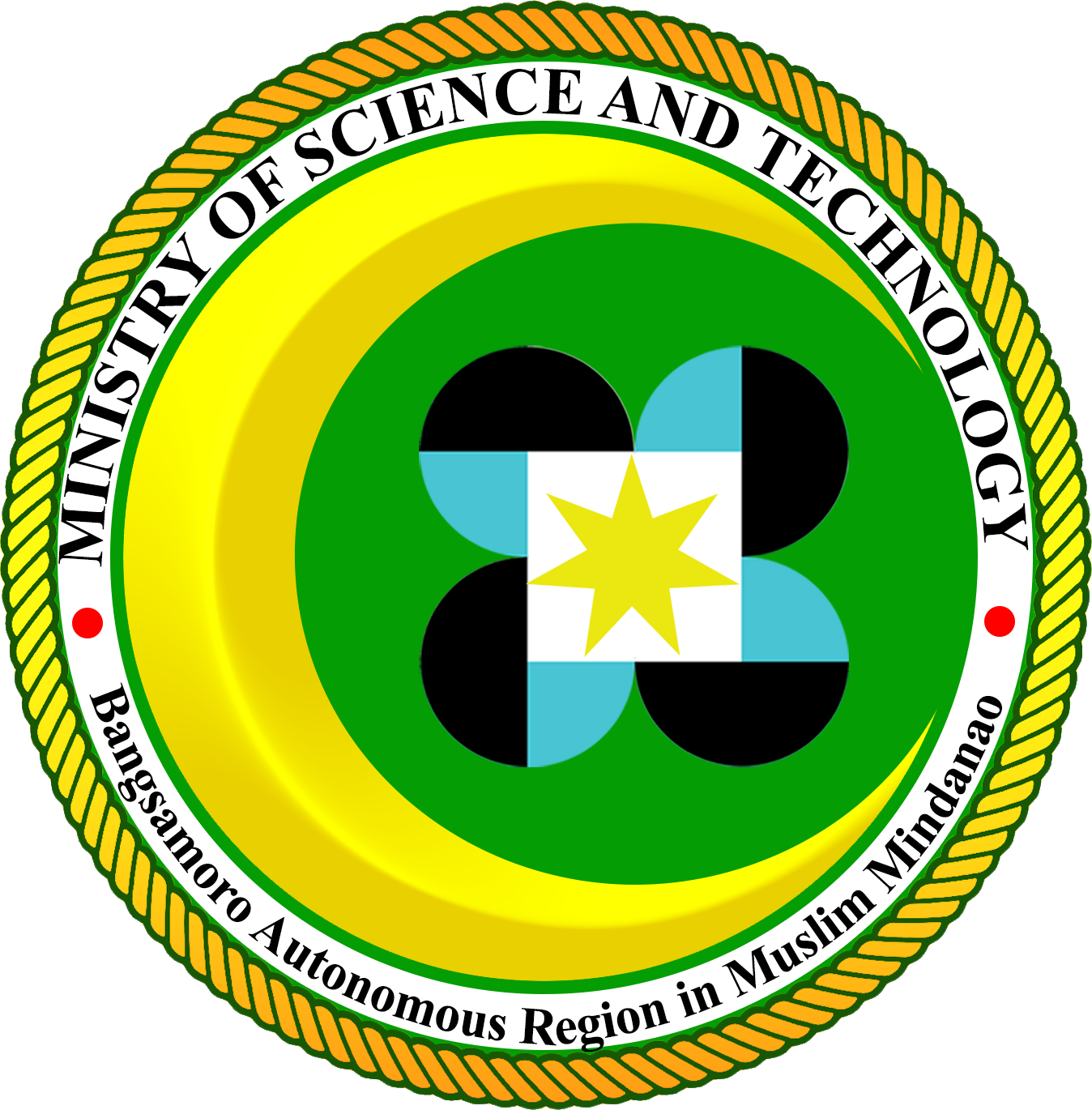

Agency overview
- Preceding agency: DOST–ARMM
- Jurisdiction: Regional government of Bangsamoro
- Headquarters: BARMM Complex, Cotabato City
- Minister responsible: Baileng Mantawil, Minister of Science and Technology
- Website: most.bangsamoro.gov.ph

The Ministry of Science and Technology (MOST) is the regional executive department of the Bangsamoro Autonomous Region in Muslim Mindanao (BARMM) responsible for affairs relating to science and technology in the region.

== History ==
The Ministry of Science and Technology (MOST) considers itself as a succeeding agency of the regional office of the Philippine national government's Department of Science and Technology (DOST) which oversaw science and technology affairs in the Autonomous Region in Muslim Mindanao (ARMM), Bangsamoro's predecessor regional government.

When the ARMM was succeeded by the Bangsamoro Autonomous Region in Muslim Mindanao (BARMM) in 2019, the regional departments of the former ARMM were reconfigured into ministries of Bangsamoro. When the MOST was established it absorbed the existing programs and projects of the DOST for now defunct ARMM.

== Ministers ==
#	Minister	Term began	Term ended	Chief Minister
1	Aida Silongan	February 26, 2019	2025	Murad Ebrahim
–	Jehan Usop (Acting)	May 27, 2025	August 18, 2025	Abdulraof Macacua
2	Baileng Mantawil	August 18, 2025	incumbent	Abdulraof Macacua
