= Ministry of Social Services and Development =

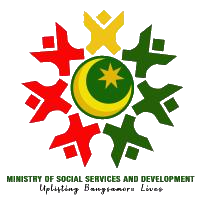

Agency overview
- Preceding agency: DSWD–ARMM
- Jurisdiction: Regional government of Bangsamoro
- Minister responsible: Raissa Herradura Jajurie, Minister of Social Services and Development
- Website: mssd.bangsamoro.gov.ph

The Ministry of Social Services and Development (MSSD) is the regional executive department of the Bangsamoro Autonomous Region in Muslim Mindanao (BARMM) responsible for affairs relating to social services in the region.

== History ==
When the ARMM was succeeded by the Bangsamoro Autonomous Region in Muslim Mindanao (BARMM) in 2019, the regional departments of the former Autonomous Region in Muslim Mindanao were reconfigured into ministries of Bangsamoro. The Department of Social Welfare and Development-Autonomous Region in Muslim Mindanao (DSWD-ARMM) was reorganized as the Ministry of Social Services and Development.

Raissa Herradura Jajurie was appointed on February 26, 2019 by interim Chief Minister Murad Ebrahim as the newly reconfigured Bangsamoro department's first minister.

== Ministers ==
#	Minister	Term began	Term ended	Chief Minister
1	Raissa Jajurie	February 26, 2019	incumbent	Murad Ebrahim
