= Maguindanao del Norte =

Province in Bangsamoro, Philippines

Maguindanao del Norte Utara Magindanaw اُوْتَرَ مَڬِنْدَنَوْ
- Province
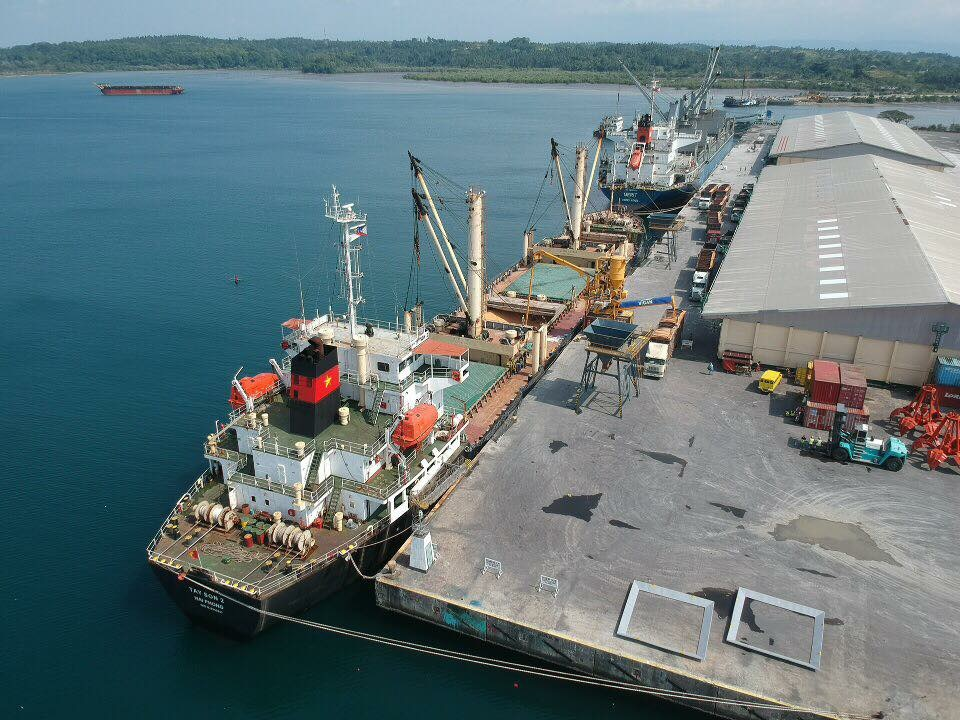
- Polloc Port in Parang

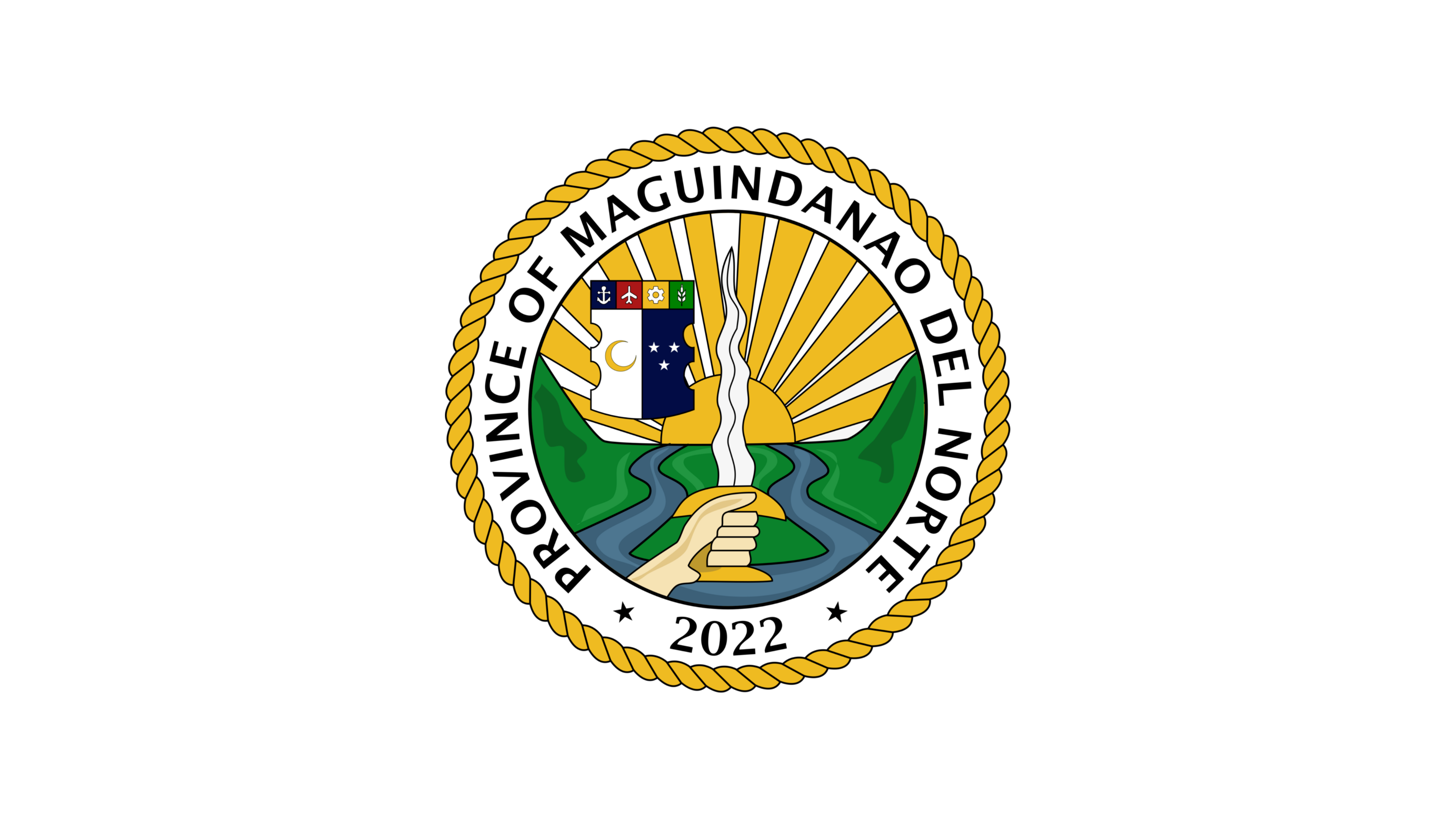
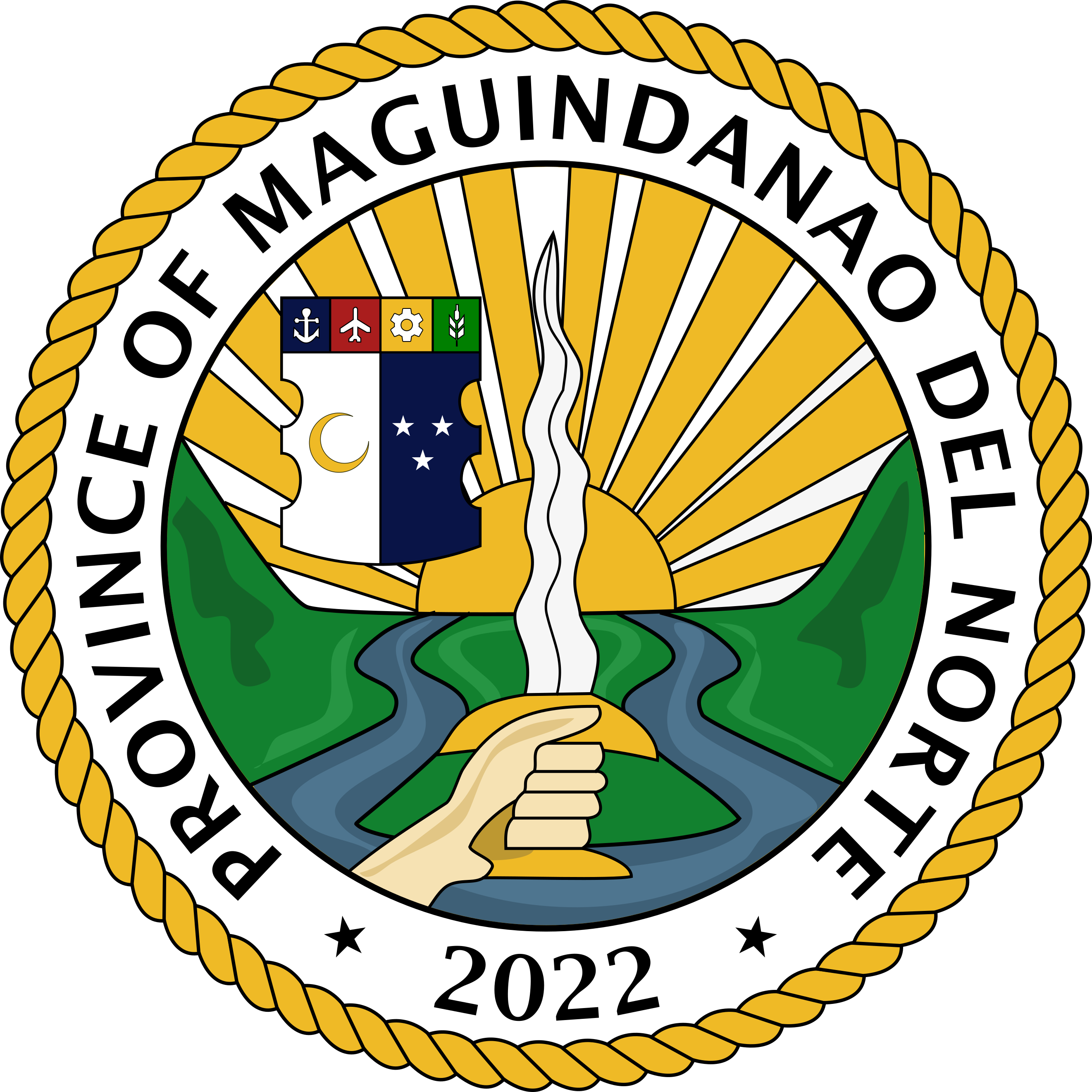
- Flag Seal

- Location in the Philippines
- Interactive map of Maguindanao del Norte
- Coordinates: 07°08′N 124°16′E
- Country: Philippines
- Region: Bangsamoro
- Founded: September 17, 2022
- Effectivity: January 9, 2023
- Capital: Datu Odin Sinsuat
- Government seat: Sultan Kudarat (Note: Under the Republic Act No. 11550, Datu Odin Sinsuat was designated as the official capital and seat of government of Maguindanao del Norte. However, the provincial administration continues to operate out of the former Maguindanao provincial capitol located in Sultan Kudarat.)
- Largest city: Cotabato City**

Government
  - Governor: Tucao Mastura
  - Vice Governor: Marshall I. Sinsuat
  - Representative: Bai Dimple I. Mastura
  - Legislature: Maguindanao del Norte Provincial Board
  - Electorate: 530,526 voters (2025)

Area
  - Total: 3,988.82 km^{2} (1,540.09 sq mi)

Population (2024 census)
  - Total: 1,124,811
  - Rank: 52nd out of 82
  - Density: 281.991/km^{2} (730.353/sq mi)
  - Rank: 24th out of 82
- Demonym: North Magindanawon

Divisions
  - Independent cities: 1: Cotabato City**
  - Component cities: 0
  - Municipalities: 12: Barira; Buldon; Datu Blah T. Sinsuat; Datu Odin Sinsuat; Kabuntalan; Matanog; Northern Kabuntalan; Parang; Sultan Kudarat; Sultan Mastura; Talitay; Upi
  - Districts: Legislative districts of Maguindanao del Norte

Economy
  - Income class: 4th provincial income class
  - Poverty incidence: 28.4% (2023)
  - Revenue: ₱ 2,549 million (2024)
  - Assets: ₱ 2,469 million (2024)
  - Expenditure: ₱ 2,011 million (2024)
  - Liabilities: ₱ 652.4 million (2024)
- Time zone: UTC+8 (PHT)
- ISO 3166 code: PH-MGN
- Spoken languages: Iranun; Maguindanaon; Mëranaw; Teduray; Tagalog; Ilonggo; English
- ** Cotabato City is an independent-component city.

Maguindanao del Norte, officially the Province of Maguindanao del Norte (Maguindanaon: Dairat nu Utara Magindanaw, Jawi: دَاِيْرَتْ نُوْ اُوْتَرَ مَڬِنْدَنَوْ; Iranun: Perobinsia a Pangutaran Magindanao, ڤروبنسيا ا ڤڠوترن مڬیندانو Filipino: Hilagang Maguindanao), is a province in the Philippines located in the Bangsamoro region in Mindanao. Its capital is the municipality of Datu Odin Sinsuat. It borders Cotabato province to the east, Lanao del Sur to the north, Maguindanao del Sur to the south-east, and Sultan Kudarat to the south.

The province's largest city, Cotabato City, is administratively independent from the province but is grouped for congressional representation.

== History ==
Historical affiliations

Spain 1521–1898
United States of America 1898–1942
Japan 1942–1945
United States of America 1945–1946
Philippines 1946–present

=== Foundation ===
The idea of creating a province in the present territory of Maguindanao del Norte dates back to 2006 when the province of Shariff Kabunsuan briefly existed for two years before being reverted as part of Maguindanao.

Maguindanao del Norte was formed when Maguindanao province was split into two provinces; the other province being Maguindanao del Sur. The division occurred following a plebiscite on September 17, 2022 which ratified Republic Act 11550 wherein it proposed the partitioning of the province. Former Maguindanao Vice Governor Ainee Sinsuat was expected to become the acting governor of the newly formed Maguindanao del Norte province. However an issue arose since the determination of the first set of officials of the province presumes that the plebiscite was held prior to the 2022 national and local elections. However the plebiscite was postponed to a date after the elections. This led to the Commission on Elections to come up with a legal opinion. The position was issued on September 28, 2022, where the election body concluded that only the Department of the Interior and Local Government could appoint the first officials of the province.

Sinsuat took oath as the first governor of the province on October 13, 2022 with former Maguindanao Provincial Board member Sharifudin Mastura as her vice governor. A transition period would take place until January 9, 2023. On April 28, 2023, President Bongbong Marcos appointed Abdulraof Macacua as the full pledged governor of the province while Sinsuat was appointed as the vice governor. On August 14, 2023, Sinsuat vacated her position as vice governor and revived her claim as the legitimate governor. Both the national and Bangsamoro regional government do not recognize Sinsuat's claim.

== Geography ==
Maguindanao del Norte has a total area of 3,988.82 square kilometers (1,540.09 sq mi). The province is bordered to the north by Lanao del Sur, to the east by Cotabato, to the southwest by Maguindanao del Sur, and to the south by Sultan Kudarat. It has an outlying island near the mainland called Bongo Island, which falls under its jurisdiction.

=== Administrative divisions ===
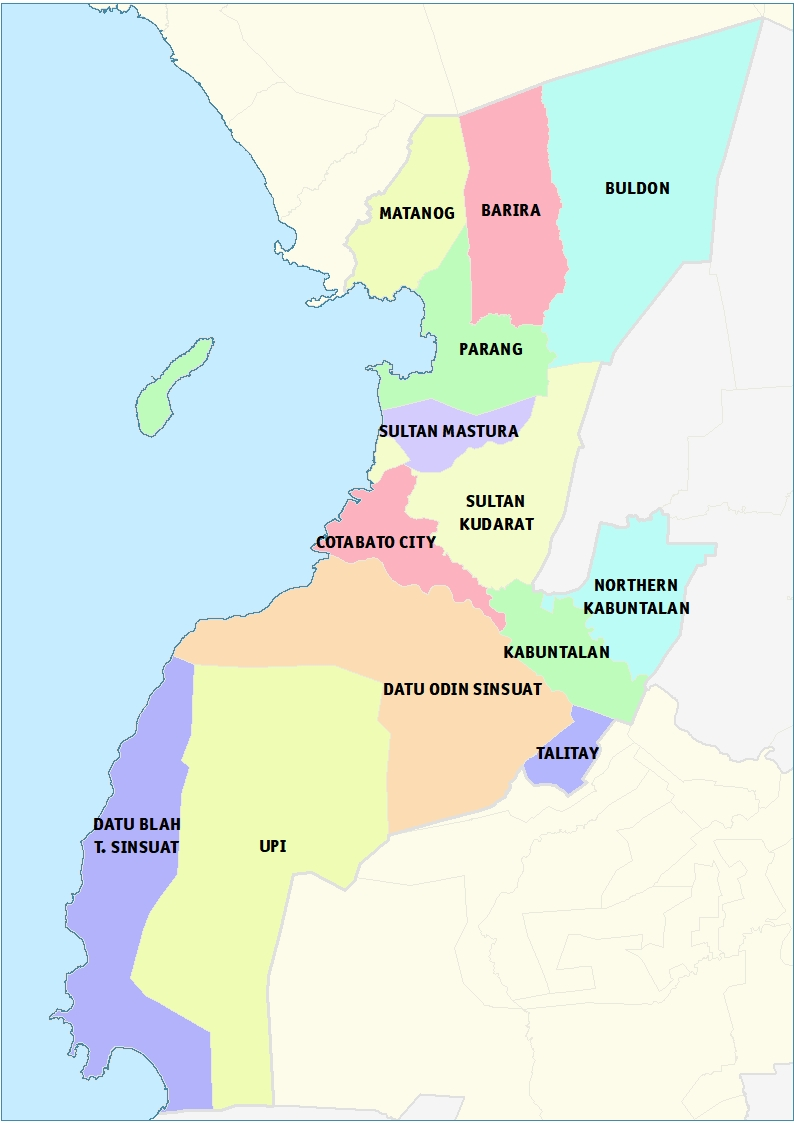
Map of Maguindanao del Norte

Maguindanao del Norte is composed of 1 independent city, 12 municipalities, and 3 legislative districts.

- † Capital municipality
- Municipality
- ∗∗ Independent component city (only geographically grouped with the province)
- ∞ Largest settlement

City or municipality		DistrictPSGC unknown	Population			±% p.a.	AreaPSGC unknown		Density		Barangay	Coordinates^{[A]}
			(2020)		(2015)		km^{2}	sq mi	/km^{2}	/sq mi		
Barira		1st	3.8%	36,143	30,004	3.61%	392.61	151.59	92	240	14	7°28′15″N 124°21′23″E
Buldon		1st	4.2%	39,684	35,282	2.26%	429.40	165.79	92	240	15	7°30′33″N 124°22′17″E
Cotabato City∞	∗∗	Lone	—	325,079	299,438	1.58%	176.00	67.95	1,800	4,700	37	7°13′15″N 124°14′48″E
Datu Blah T. Sinsuat		2nd	3.0%	28,243	25,024	2.33%	147.21	56.84	190	490	13	6°55′38″N 123°58′18″E
Datu Odin Sinsuat	†	2nd	12.4%	116,768	99,210	3.15%	461.80	178.30	250	650	34	7°01′25″N 124°18′57″E
Kabuntalan		2nd	2.7%	25,439	17,276	7.65%	371.08	143.27	69	180	17	7°07′03″N 124°23′04″E
Matanog		1st	3.8%	36,034	29,770	3.70%	146.50	56.56	250	650	8	7°26′17″N 124°15′14″E
Northern Kabuntalan		2nd	2.8%	26,277	25,232	0.78%	106.77	41.22	250	650	11	7°10′13″N 124°25′52″E
Parang		1st	10.9%	102,914	89,194	2.76%	850.78	328.49	120	310	25	7°22′32″N 124°16′02″E
Sultan Kudarat		1st	11.1%	105,121	95,201	1.91%	712.91	275.26	150	390	39	7°16′45″N 124°18′12″E
Sultan Mastura		1st	2.7%	25,331	22,261	2.49%	242.07	93.46	100	260	13	7°18′15″N 124°16′46″E
Talitay		2nd	1.9%	17,463	14,863	3.12%	62.96	24.31	280	730	9	7°01′42″N 124°23′45″E
Upi		2nd	6.3%	59,004	53,583	1.85%	742.95	286.85	79	200	23	7°00′38″N 124°09′45″E
Total^{[B]}				618,421	536,900	2.73%	—^{[C]}	—^{[C]}	—^{[C]}	—^{[C]}	258	(see GeoGroup box)
1. Coordinates are sortable by latitude. (Italicized entries indicate the generic location. Otherwise, they mark the city or town center).; 2. Total figures exclude the independent component city of Cotabato, which is geographically within and traditionally grouped with the province.; 3. The city of Cotabato, which is geographically within and traditionally grouped with the province, is independent from the province and does not vote for provincial officials. Only votes with Maguindanao del Norte for representation in the various national legislatures.; 4. Dashes (—) in cells indicate unavailable information.

== Demographics ==
Population census of Maguindanao del Norte
Year	Pop.	±% p.a.
1903	1,706	—
1918	25,719	+19.83%
1939	52,766	+3.48%
1948	105,386	+7.99%
1960	190,201	+5.04%
1970	241,796	+2.43%
1975	265,383	+1.88%
1980	297,597	+2.32%
1990	424,267	+3.61%
1995	456,208	+1.37%
2000	529,697	+3.25%
2010	695,622	+2.76%
2015	821,475	+3.22%
2020	926,037	+2.55%
2024	1,124,811	+4.78%
^{a} No census was held in 1985 due to a political and economic crisis^{b} Census was delayed from the original 2005 due to the reenacted budget that lasted until 2006; Source: National Census and Statistics Office (1975, 1980, and 1990 census), National Statistics Office (1995, 2000, 2007, and 2010 census) and Philippine Statistics Authority (2015 and 2020 census)

View chart definition.

According to the 2024 census conducted before the province's creation, Maguindanao del Norte has a population of 1,124,811 people, with a population density of 280 inhabitants per square kilometer or 730 inhabitants per square mile. The most dominant ethnic group is the Maguindanaon who are spread throughout the province. Then there are other ethnic groups, such as the Iranun who are dominant in the three northernmost municipalities (Matanog, Buldon, and Barira), the Teduray who are dominant in the municipality of Upi, and the Maranao who live on the northern and western borders.

Population percentage
(2024 Census)

- Barira: 36,143 (3.8%)
- Bonggo: 32,298 (3.4%)
- Buldon: 39,684 (4.2%)
- Cotabato: 325,079 (34.5%)
- Datu Balabaran Sinsuat: 55,836 (5.9%)
- Datu Blah T. Sinsuat: 28,243 (3.0%)
- Datu Odin Sinsuat: 34,244 (3.6%)
- Kabuntalan: 25,439 (2.7%)
- Matanog: 36,034 (3.8%)
- Northern Kabuntalan: 26,277 (2.8%)
- Nuling: 38,589 (4.1%)
- Parang: 87,305 (9.3%)
- Sheik Abas Hamza: 26,703 (2.8%)
- Sultan Kudarat: 66,532 (7.1%)
- Sultan Matsura: 25,331 (2.7%)
- Upi: 59,004 (6.3%)
Total population: 1,124,811

== Government ==
GOVERNORS OF MAGUINDANAO DEL NORTE

1. Bai Fatima Ainee L. Sinsuat – assumed "Acting" (October 13, 2022 to April 05, 2023)
2. Abdulraof A. Macacua – official "OIC" (April 28, 2023 to March 26, 2025)
3. Datu Sharifudin Tucao P. Mastura – appointed "Acting" (March 26, 2025 to June 30, 2025)
4. Datu Tucao O. Mastura – first ever officially elected (June 30, 2025 to present)

VICE GOVERNORS OF MAGUINDANAO DEL NORTE

1. Datu Sharifudin Tucao P. Mastura – assumed "Acting" (October 13, 2022 to April 05, 2023)
2. Bai Fatima Ainee L. Sinsuat – official "OIC" (April 28, 2023 to March 26, 2025)
3. Abdulnasser A. Abas – appointed "Acting" (March 26, 2025 to June 30, 2025)
4. Datu Marshall I. Sinsuat – first ever officially elected (June 30, 2025 to present)

== Economy ==
Transportation and storage, other non-agricultural services, food and accommodation services is becoming the fastest growing sector in the province. Agricultural activities include forestry and fishing.

According to the Philippine Statistics Authority, Maguindanao del Norte had improved its economic growth from 7.8 percent in 2021 (before its establishment) to 8.8 percent in 2022. The province had a Gross Domestic Product of 78.01 billion Philippine pesos in 2022.

== Notable people ==
- Orlando Quevedo – Cardinal of the Roman Catholic Church
- Elias Lumayog Ayuban Jr. – second bishop of Diocese of Cubao.
- Noel Felongco – Lead Convenor of National Anti-Poverty Commission
- Imah Dumagay – Stand-up comedian based in Dubai
- Romero Duno – Professional Boxer
- Jay Jaboneta – Blogger, Philanthropist, Media Advocate, and Online Community Organizer
- Kublai Millan – Prolific Artist
- Ben Farrales – Fashion Designer, known for his Muslim-inspired terno designs
