= Ministry of Public Order and Safety =

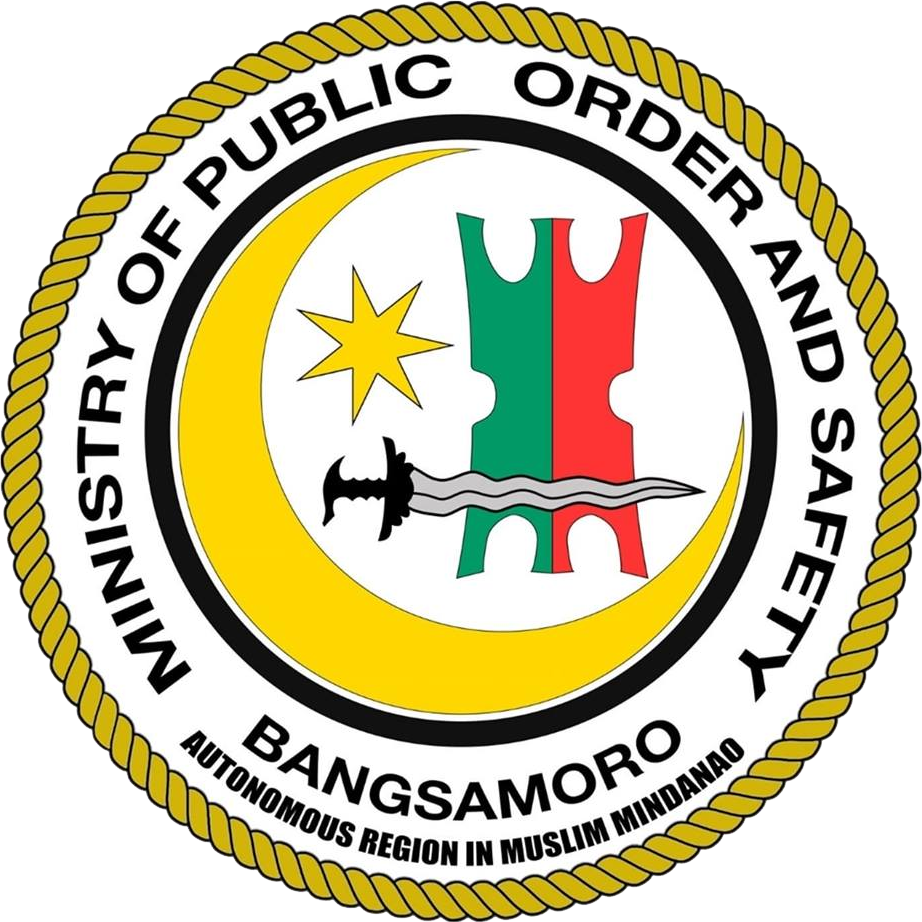

Agency overview
- Jurisdiction: Regional government of Bangsamoro
- Minister responsible: Hussein P. Munoz, Minister, Ministry of Public Order and Safety
- Website: mpos.bangsamoro.gov.ph

The Ministry of Public Order and Safety (MPOS) shall be responsible for public safety. It shall have coordinative function with offices and agencies that maintain public order and safety in the region, and shall perform functions relating to peace building, reconciliation, and unification of all the peoples of the region Bangsamoro Autonomous Region in Muslim Mindanao (BARMM)

The MPOS did not have a counterpart office from the Autonomous Region in Muslim Mindanao (ARMM), the predecessor autonomous region of Bangsamoro.

Power and Functions

Serves as a member of the Regional Peace and Order Council;

Establishes proper coordinating mechanism with the Armed Forces of the Philippines, Philippine National Police, National Police Commission, Bureau of Jail Management and Penology, Coast Guard, Bureau of Fire Protection, and other law enforcement agencies or offices in the Bangsamoro Autonomous Region to enhance the safety and security of the region;

Monitors and evaluates the prevailing peace and security situation in the region and submit a report thereon to the Office of the Chief Minister;

Establishes community-based early warning/ response and conflict reporting system relating to public order and safety;

Formulates and implements programs, projects, and activities relating to religious tolerance, preventing and countering violent extremism;

Conducts programs, projects, and activities relating to the promotion of peace and sustainable development, reconciliation, unification, and peaceful co-existence;

Formulates and implements policies and programs for the effective settlement of family feuds (rido) and other horizontal conflicts in the region, as well as for the prevention of the recurrence of such conflicts;

Implements laws, policies, programs, and projects of the BARMM concerning peace, public order, and safety;

And performs such other functions as may be prescribed by law thereafter or as may be assigned by the Chief Minister.

The first Minister of Public Order and Safety is Hussein P. Muñoz who was appointed by Murad Ebrahim on February 26, 2019.

== Ministers ==
#	Minister	Term began	Term ended	Chief Minister
1	Hussein P. Muñoz	February 26, 2019	incumbent	Murad Ebrahim

== See also ==
- National Disaster Risk Reduction and Management Council
- Office of Civil Defense
- Department of National Defense
