= Ministry of Environment, Natural Resources and Energy =

Environment ministry of Bangsamoro region

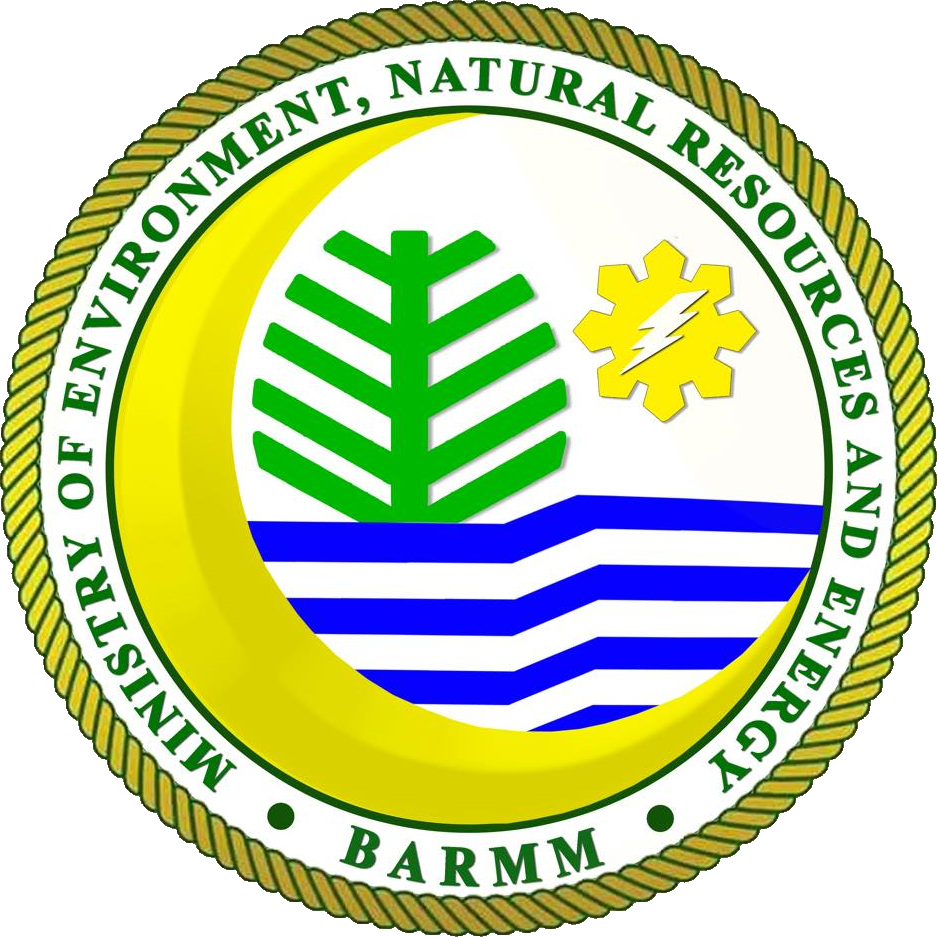

Agency overview
- Preceding agency: DENR–ARMM
- Jurisdiction: Regional government of Bangsamoro
- Minister responsible: Akmad Brahim, Minister of Environment, Natural Resources and Energy
- Website: menre.bangsamoro.gov.ph

The Ministry of Environment, Natural Resources and Energy (MENRE) is the regional executive department of the Bangsamoro Autonomous Region in Muslim Mindanao (BARMM) responsible for affairs relating to the environment, natural resources, and energy in the region.

== History ==
The Ministry of Environment, Natural Resources and Energy (MAFAR) succeeded the regional office of the Department of Environment and Natural Resources (DENR) in the now defunct Autonomous Region in Muslim Mindanao.

When the ARMM was succeeded by the Bangsamoro Autonomous Region in Muslim Mindanao (BARMM) in 2019, the regional departments of the former ARMM were reconfigured into ministries of Bangsamoro. Abdulraof Macacua was appointed on February 26, 2019, by interim Chief Minister Murad Ebrahim as the newly reconfigured Bangsamoro department's first minister. On July 29, 2019, the ministry unveiled its first official seal.

In November 2020, the DENR transferred its assets from its field offices for Regions 9, 10, and 12 to the MENRE. It also transferred jurisdiction in Bangsamoro managed by these field offices: namely Turtle Islands Wildlife Sanctuary (DENR-9), the Lake Lanao Watershed (DENR-10), and the Liguasan Marsh in (DENR-12).

== Ministers ==
| # | Minister | Term began | Term ended | Chief Minister |
|---|---|---|---|---|
| 1 | Abdulraof Macacua | February 26, 2019 | 2022 | Murad Ebrahim |
| 2 | Akmad Brahim | 2022 | incumbent | Murad Ebrahim |
