= Kabuntalan =

Municipality in Maguindanao del Norte, Philippines

Kabuntalan كبونتالن Mother Kabuntalan Tumbao
- Municipality
- Municipality of Kabuntalan
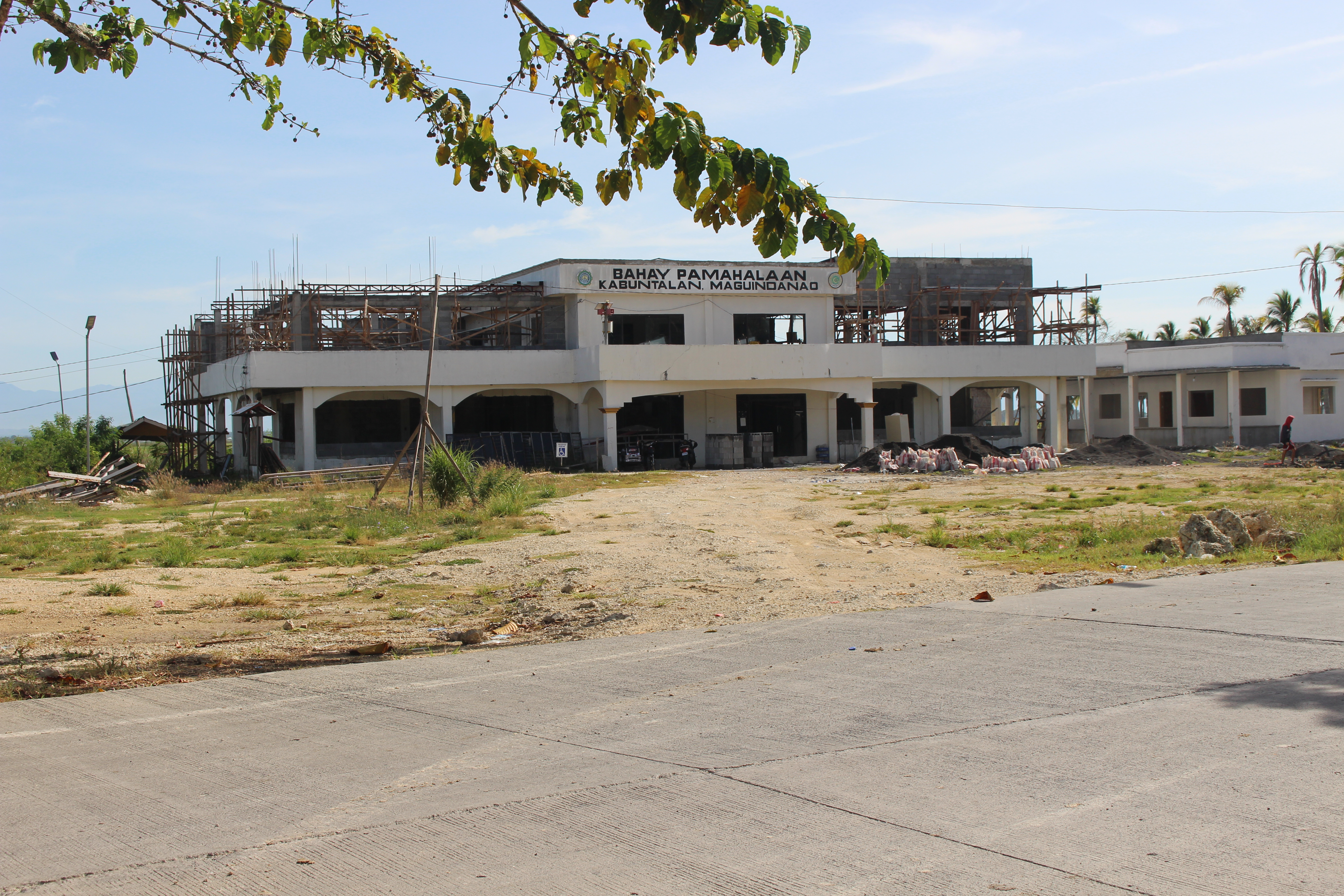
- Municipal Hall

- Seal

- Map of Maguindanao del Norte with Kabuntalan highlighted
- Interactive map of Kabuntalan
- Location within the Philippines
- Coordinates: 7°07′07″N 124°21′53″E
- Country: Philippines
- Region: Bangsamoro Autonomous Region in Muslim Mindanao
- Province: Maguindanao del Norte
- House district: Lone district
- Parliamentary district: 3rd district
- Founded: June 16, 1949
- Barangays: 17 (see Barangays)

Government
  - Type: Sangguniang Bayan
  - Mayor: Salaban G. Diocolano
  - Vice Mayor: Datu Rahaf D. Diocolano
  - House Representative: Sittie Shahara "Dimple" I. Mastura
  - Municipal Council: Members: Tato M. Diocolano; Sidik K. Hadjinor; Janjalani N. Kusain; Datu Bara E. Lauban Jr.; Anwar R. Salik; Rayan G. Alamada; Laila E. Sionga; Pangandaman A. Uko
  - Electorate: 12,729 voters (2025)

Area
  - Total: 371.08 km^{2} (143.27 sq mi)
- Elevation: 4.0 m (13.1 ft)
- Highest elevation: 36 m (118 ft)
- Lowest elevation: −1 m (−3.3 ft)

Population (2024 census)
  - Total: 41,146
  - Density: 110.88/km^{2} (287.18/sq mi)
  - Households: 3,950

Economy
  - Income class: 4th municipal income class
  - Poverty incidence: 52.67% (2023)
  - Revenue: ₱ 139.5 million (2024)
  - Assets: ₱ 395.8 million (2024)
  - Expenditure: ₱ 117.8 million (2024)
  - Liabilities: ₱ 62.8 million (2024)

Service provider
  - Electricity: Maguindanao Electric Cooperative (MAGELCO)
- Time zone: UTC+8 (PST)
- ZIP code: 9606
- PSGC: 1903814000
- IDD : area code: +63 (0)64
- Native languages: Maguindanao; Tagalog
- Website: www.kabuntalan.gov.ph

Kabuntalan, also known as Mother Kabuntalan, officially the Municipality of Kabuntalan (Maguindanaon: Inged nu Kabuntalan; Tagalog: Bayan ng Kabuntalan), is a municipality in the province of Maguindanao del Norte, Philippines. According to the 2024 census, it had a population of 41,146.

It is formerly known as Tumbao.

The town was part of the province of Shariff Kabunsuan from October 2006 until its nullification by the Supreme Court in July 2008.

== Geography ==
=== Barangays ===
Kabuntalan is politically subdivided into 17 barangays. Each barangay consists of puroks while some have sitios.

- Bagumbayan
- Buterin
- Dadtumog (Dadtumeg)
- Gambar
- Ganta
- Katidtuan
- Langeban
- Liong
- Lower Taviran
- Maitong
- Matilak
- Pagalungan
- Payan
- Pedtad
- Pened
- Poblacion
- Upper Taviran

=== Climate ===
Climate data for Kabuntalan, Maguindanao del Norte
Month	Jan	Feb	Mar	Apr	May	Jun	Jul	Aug	Sep	Oct	Nov	Dec	Year
Mean daily maximum °C (°F)	31 (88)	32 (90)	32 (90)	32 (90)	31 (88)	29 (84)	29 (84)	29 (84)	30 (86)	30 (86)	30 (86)	31 (88)	31 (87)
Mean daily minimum °C (°F)	21 (70)	21 (70)	21 (70)	23 (73)	23 (73)	23 (73)	23 (73)	23 (73)	23 (73)	23 (73)	23 (73)	22 (72)	22 (72)
Average precipitation mm (inches)	30 (1.2)	19 (0.7)	25 (1.0)	24 (0.9)	64 (2.5)	88 (3.5)	102 (4.0)	105 (4.1)	76 (3.0)	82 (3.2)	60 (2.4)	26 (1.0)	701 (27.5)
Average rainy days	9.8	8.5	11.3	11.9	21.6	23.9	24.1	24.5	20.9	21.8	16.8	11.8	206.9
Source: Meteoblue (modeled/calculated data, not measured locally)

== Demographics ==
Population census of Kabuntalan
Year	Pop.	±% p.a.
1918	4,062	—
1939	5,393	+1.36%
1960	13,012	+4.28%
1970	11,465	−1.26%
1975	9,693	−3.31%
1980	11,603	+3.66%
1990	16,842	+3.80%
1995	19,409	+2.69%
2000	23,137	+3.84%
2007	22,363	−0.47%
2010	16,794	−9.90%
2015	17,276	+0.54%
2020	25,439	+8.49%
2024	41,146	+12.24%
Source: Philippine Statistics Authority

== Transportation ==
Construction began in 2023 for a bridge connecting Kabuntalan with Pahamuddin, Cotabato in the contiguous Bangsamoro region.

== Economy ==
Poverty Incidence of Kabuntalan

Source: Philippine Statistics Authority

Gross Domestic Product

The Gross Domestic Product of the Municipality (2022) is 9,763,500,000(PHP).

== See also ==
- List of renamed cities and municipalities in the Philippines
