= Ministry of the Interior and Local Government =

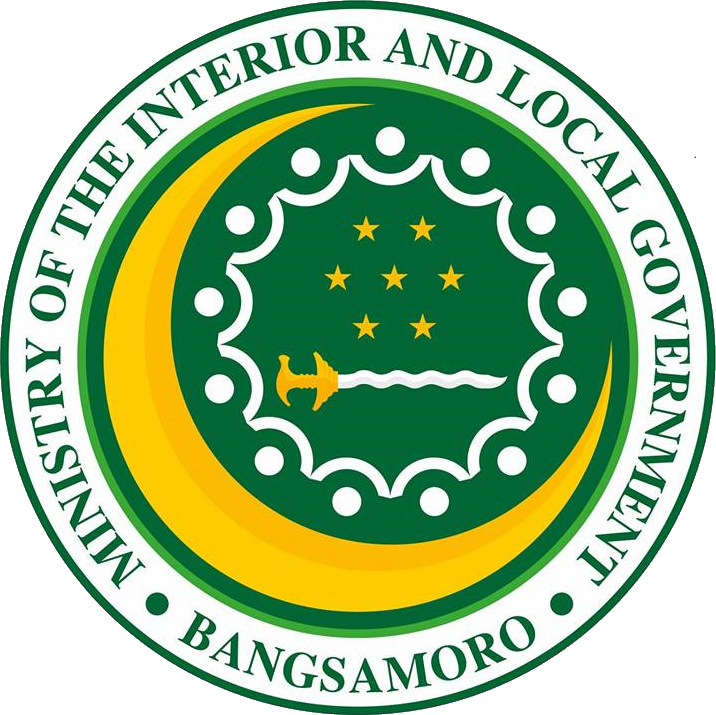

Agency overview
- Preceding agency: DILG–ARMM
- Jurisdiction: Regional government of Bangsamoro
- Headquarters: BARMM Complex, Cotabato City
- Minister responsible: Sha Elijah Dumama-Alba, Minister of Local Government
- Website: mlg.bangsamoro.gov.ph

The Ministry of the Interior and Local Government (MILG), also known as the Ministry of Local Government (MLG), is the regional executive department of the Bangsamoro Autonomous Region in Muslim Mindanao (BARMM) responsible for local governance.

== History ==
The Ministry of Local Government of Bangsamoro was established as a regional office of the Philippine national government's Department of the Interior and Local Government Autonomous Region in Muslim Mindanao back when the BARMM's predecessor, the Autonomous Region in Muslim Mindanao (ARMM), was still extant. Philippine President Corazon Aquino issued on October 12, 1990 Executive Order 425, which placed various line agencies and offices of the national government covering the ARMM under the autonomous region's control and supervision, including the government body dealing with local government.

When the ARMM was succeeded by the Bangsamoro Autonomous Region in Muslim Mindanao (BARMM) in 2019, the regional departments of the former ARMM were reconfigured into ministries of Bangsamoro. DILG-ARMM became the Ministry of Local Government, and Naguib Sinarimbo was appointed on February 26, 2019 by interim Chief Minister Murad Ebrahim as the newly reconfigured Bangsamoro department's first minister.

== Function ==
The ministry's function is to promote and maintain security in Bangsamoro's constituent local government units (LGUs) as well as to aid the chief minister in the general supervision of the governance of the region's LGUs immediate local government.

== Ministers ==
#	Minister	Term began	Term ended	Chief Minister
1	Naguib Sinarimbo	February 26, 2019	December 6, 2023	Murad Ebrahim
2	Sha Elijah Dumama-Alba	December 7, 2023	July 21, 2025	Murad Ebrahim
2	Sha Elijah Dumama-Alba	December 7, 2023	July 21, 2025	Abdulraof Macacua
3	Abdulraof Macacua	July 22, 2025	April 5, 2026	Abdulraof Macacua
4	Jordan Bayam	April 6, 2026	incumbent	Abdulraof Macacua
