= Chief Minister of Bangsamoro =

Regional executive in the Philippines

- Filipino: Punong Ministro ng Bangsamoro; Arabic: رئيس وزراء بانجسامورو
- Seal of Bangsamoro

- Flag of Bangsamoro

- Incumbent; Abdulraof Macacua since October 30, 2026
- Member of: Regional bodies: Bangsamoro Parliament; Council of Leaders; National government bodies: Mindanao Development Authority; National Security Council; National Economic and Development Authority
- Residence: The Astana
- Seat: Bangsamoro Government Center
- Appointer: Bangsamoro Parliament
- Term length: 3 years
- Constituting instrument: Bangsamoro Organic Law
- Precursor: Governor of the Autonomous Region in Muslim Mindanao
- Formation: 2019
- First holder: Murad Ebrahim
- Deputy: Two deputy chief ministers

The chief minister of Bangsamoro (Filipino: Punong ministro ng Bangsamoro; Arabic: رئيس وزراء بانجسامورو) is the executive head of the Bangsamoro Autonomous Region in Muslim Mindanao, an autonomous region within the Philippines.

The current chief minister is Abdulraof Macacua, who was elected by the Bangsamoro Parliament on October 30, 2026. He previously served as interim chief minister from 2025 until the end of the Bangsamoro transition period.

== Background ==
=== Function ===
The chief minister is the head official who represents the government of the Bangsamoro Autonomous Region, and the position is constituted by the Bangsamoro Organic Law (BOL). The holder of the post appoints the heads of the Bangsamoro regional government's ministries, agencies, bureaus and other offices. The chief minister could also formulate a platform that would need to be approved by the Bangsamoro Parliament and has the power to issue executive orders and other policies. The holder of the position could also proclaim a state of calamity in the region.

The holder of the position also holds ex-officio memberships in other government bodies controlled by the national government, such as the Mindanao Development Authority, the National Security Council, and the National Economic and Development Authority and represents the regional interest of the Bangsamoro. The chief minister is also a member of the Council of Leaders, which, according to the BOL, "shall advice the chief minister on matters of government in the Bangsamoro region".

The chief minister can also indirectly dissolve the parliament by advising the Wa'lī, who has the legal authority to dissolve the legislature. As per law, the holder is also to be assisted by two deputy chief ministers who are to be nominated by the chief minister themselves and elected by the parliament. The deputies are required by law to hail from a different sub-region from the chief minister. The chief minister's power of appointment is codified in regional law through Bangsamoro Act No. 11, which states that the official has powers to appoint regional government positions that have a salary grade of 25 and above unless otherwise stated by law.

=== Eligibility ===
Only a member of the Bangsamoro Parliament, who is at least 25 years of age at the time of election, and a natural born citizen of the Philippines, is eligible to be elected as chief minister.

== History ==
On February 22, 2019, Murad Ebrahim was appointed and sworn in by President Rodrigo Duterte as Bangsamoro's first interim chief minister, upon being nominated by the Moro Islamic Liberation Front. He served until March 3, 2025, when he reportedly resigned to focus on his campaign for the upcoming parliamentary elections. Ebrahim was succeeded by Abdulraof Macacua, who was appointed by President Bongbong Marcos on March 9, 2025.

The first parliamentary elections, originally scheduled for 2022 and later postponed to 2025, were held on September 14, 2026. The newly elected 1st Bangsamoro Parliament convened its first session on October 30, electing the incumbent interim Chief Minister Macacua as Bangsamoro's first regular chief minister.

== Election ==
According to Article VII, Section 4 of the Bangsamoro Organic Law, the chief minister is elected by all members of the Parliament by a majority vote.

=== October 2026 ===
An election for the chief minister of Bangsamoro took place on October 30, 2026, at the start of the 1st Bangsamoro Parliament, a month after the 2026 parliamentary elections. Abdulraof Macacua received a majority of the votes cast and was elected chief minister.

2026 election for chief minister
Party	Candidate	Votes	%
BFP	Abdulraof Macacua (Maguindanao del Norte–3rd)	51	64.56
UBJP	Murad Ebrahim (Proportional representation)	27	34.18
Abstention		1	1.27
Total votes		79	100.00

== List of chief ministers ==
  - MILF (2) (Note: Includes the tenure of Abdulraof Macacua until 2026.)
  - BFP (1) (Note: Includes the tenure of Abdulraof Macacua from 2026.)

No.	Portrait	Chief minister Office (Lifespan)	Term of office			Election	Party	Government	Wa'lī Term
No.	Portrait	Chief minister Office (Lifespan)	Start	End	Duration	Election	Party	Government	Wa'lī Term
—	Murad Ebrahim	Murad Ebrahim; Member of the BTA (born 1949); Interim	February 22, 2019	March 12, 2025	6 years, 19 days	— (Note: Appointed by the President of the Philippines.)	MILF	Ebrahim (interim)	Khalipha Nando (2019–2023)
—	Murad Ebrahim	Murad Ebrahim; Member of the BTA (born 1949); Interim	February 22, 2019	March 12, 2025	6 years, 19 days	—	MILF	Ebrahim (interim)	Omarkhalid Ampatuan (Note: Omarkhalid Ampatuan served as officer-in-charge of the Office of the Wa'lī.) (2023–2024)
—	Murad Ebrahim	Murad Ebrahim; Member of the BTA (born 1949); Interim	February 22, 2019	March 12, 2025	6 years, 19 days	—	MILF	Ebrahim (interim)	Muslim Guiamaden (2024–present)
—	Abdulraof Macacua	Abdulraof Macacua (Note: Abdulraof Macacua served as interim chief minister from March 12, 2025 until October 30, 2026.) Member of the BTA (until 2026); MP for Maguindanao del Norte–3rd (from 2026) (born 1957)	March 12, 2025	October 30, 2026	1 year, 233 days	—	MILF	Macacua (interim)	Muslim Guiamaden (2024–present)
1	Abdulraof Macacua	Abdulraof Macacua Member of the BTA (until 2026); MP for Maguindanao del Norte–3rd (from 2026) (born 1957)	October 30, 2026	Incumbent	12 days	2026	BFP	Macacua	Muslim Guiamaden (2024–present)
