= Abdulraof Macacua =

Filipino politician and former rebel commander (born 1957)

- Official portrait, 2026

Chief Minister of Bangsamoro
- Incumbent
- Assumed office March 12, 2025 (Note: Interim before October 30, 2026)
- Wa'lī: Muslim Guiamaden
- Preceded by: Murad Ebrahim

Governor of Maguindanao del Norte
- Officer in Charge
- In office April 5, 2023 – March 26, 2025
- Vice Governor: Ainee Sinsuat
- Preceded by: Ainee Sinsuat (acting, disputed)
- Succeeded by: Sharifudin Mastura (acting)
Ministerial portfolios
Bangsamoro Minister of the Interior and Local Government
In office July 22, 2025 – April 2026
Chief Minister	Himself
Preceded by	Sha Elijah Dumama-Alba
Succeeded by	Jordan Bayam
Senior Minister of Bangsamoro
In office November 11, 2019 – April 5, 2023
Chief Minister	Murad Ebrahim
Preceded by	Esmael Omar Pasigan
Succeeded by	Abunawas Maslamama
Bangsamoro Minister of Environment, Natural Resources and Energy
In office February 26, 2019 – February 2022
Chief Minister	Murad Ebrahim
Preceded by	Position established
Succeeded by	Akmad Brahim

Member of the Bangsamoro Parliament for Maguindanao del Norte's 3rd district
- Incumbent
- Assumed office October 30, 2026

Member of the Bangsamoro Transition Authority Parliament
- In office March 15, 2025 – October 30, 2026
- In office March 29, 2019 – April 5, 2023

Personal details
- Born: Abdulraof Abdulraof Macacua; September 13, 1957 (age 69) Kabuntalan, Philippines
- Party: United Bangsamoro Justice Party (2014–2026, local); Bangsamoro Federalist Party (2026–present, local)
- Other political affiliations: Partido Federal ng Pilipinas (2023–present, federal)
- Nickname: Sammy Gambar

Military service
- Allegiance: Moro Islamic Liberation Front
- Battles/wars: Moro conflict

Abdulraof Abdulraof Macacua (born September 13, 1957), also known by his nom de guerre Sammy Gambar, is a Filipino politician and former rebel commander who has served as the first and current chief minister of Bangsamoro since 2026. A member of the Bangsamoro Federalist Party (BFP), he represents Maguindanao del Norte's 3rd parliamentary district in the Bangsamoro Parliament. Previously, he served as the second interim chief minister from March 2025 until October 2026, before becoming the first elected chief minister. He was a member of the appointed Bangsamoro Transition Authority (BTA) Parliament from 2019 to 2023 and again from 2025 to 2026, before becoming a member of the first elected Bangsamoro Parliament.

Macacua previously served in the Bangsamoro Cabinet of interim Chief Minister Murad Ebrahim as Minister of Environment, Natural Resources and Energy from 2019 to 2022 and Senior Minister from 2019 to 2023. He was also a member of the Bangsamoro Transition Commission. In 2023, President Bongbong Marcos appointed him as the officer-in-charge (OIC) governor of Maguindanao del Norte.

Macacua joined the Moro conflict in 1971 to fight for Moro self-determination. He eventually rose through the ranks of the Moro Islamic Liberation Front's (MILF) armed wing, the Bangsamoro Islamic Armed Forces (BIAF), becoming its chief of staff. He then became a member of the MILF Peace Negotiating Panel during the Bangsamoro peace process.

== Early life ==
Abdulraof Abdulraof Macacua was born on September 13, 1957, to Salma B. Macacua and Macacua W. Tubo-Tubo in Gambar in Kabuntalan, Cotabato (now in Maguindanao del Norte).

== Moro Islamic Liberation Front ==
In 1971, Macacua joined the Moro independence movement and adopted the nom de guerre Sammy Gambar. He fought for self-determination of the Moro people under the Moro Islamic Liberation Front's (MILF) armed wing, the Bangsamoro Islamic Armed Forces (BIAF). He underwent training both within the Philippines and abroad and rose the rank of the MILF. He later became Chief-of-Staff of the BIAF and a member of the MILF Peace Negotiating Panel which engaged in peace talks with the Philippine national government. He also became a member of the Bangsamoro Transition Commission, a government body tasked to create an organic law for a Bangsamoro autonomous region.

== Political career ==
=== Bangsamoro Transition Authority minister (2019–2023) ===
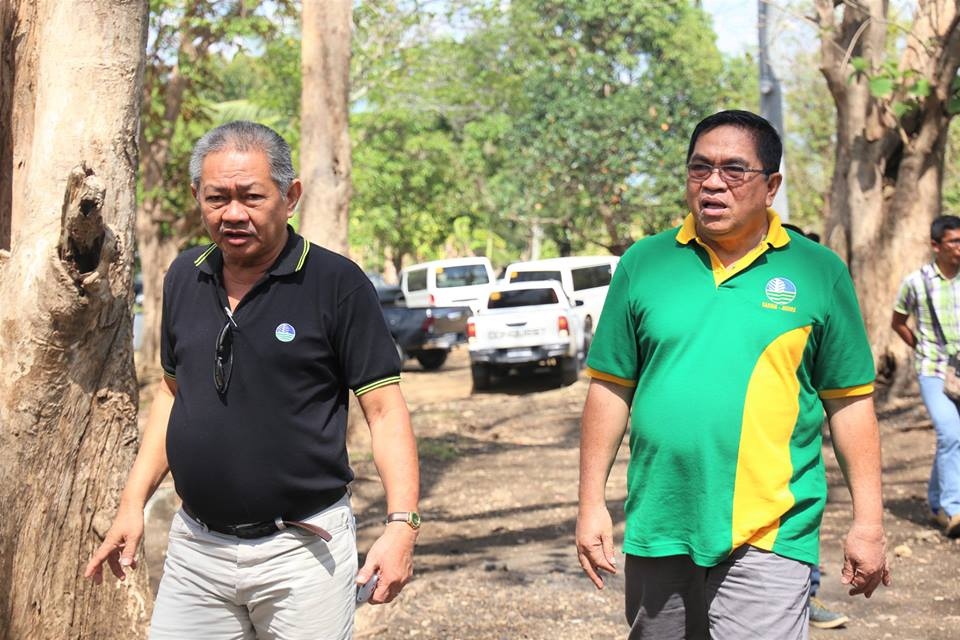
Macacua (right) as Bangsamoro environment minister

Macacua became part of the regional government of Bangsamoro which superseded the Autonomous Region in Muslim Mindanao (ARMM). He was appointed as part of the Bangsamoro Transition Authority and became a member of the interim Bangsamoro Parliament. As part of the Bangsamoro Cabinet he was tasked to head the Ministry of Environment, Natural Resources and Energy (MENRE) and serve as concurrent Senior Minister. As environment minister, he overlooked the implementation of the Kayod sa Bangsamoro program, which encouraged backyard farming in the region. In February 2022, all ministers and their deputies were ordered by Chief Minister Murad Ebrahim to submit their courtesy resignations to make way for a cabinet reshuffle. On March 14, former MENRE deputy minister Akmad Brahim took his oath of office as the new environment minister. Macacua remained as Senior Minister.

=== Governor of Maguindanao del Norte (2023–2025) ===
Macacua being sworn in as Governor of Maguindanao del Norte by President Bongbong Marcos.

On April 5, 2023, President Bongbong Marcos appointed Macacua as the Officer in Charge (OIC) governor of the newly created Maguindanao del Norte province. The Bangsamoro government initially endorsed Ibrahim Ibay, mayor of Parang, to be appointed to his role but the national government selected him in the end. He was assured by Marcos and Chief Minister Murad Ebrahim that his appointment is legal. But his appointment remains challenged.

On April 28, 2023, Macacua, along with the other appointed OIC officials of Maguindanao del Norte and Maguindanao del Sur, took their oaths of office before President Marcos at Malacañang Palace.

=== Chief Minister of Bangsamoro (2025–present) ===
==== Interim period (2025–2026) ====
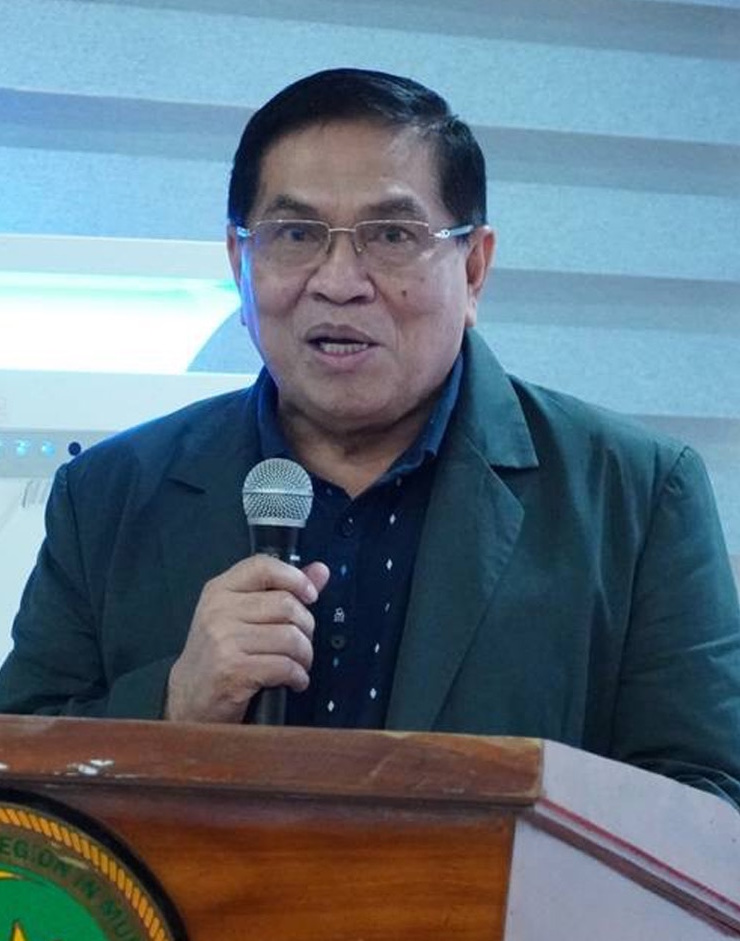
Macacua delivering a speech during the 2025 Philippine general election

President Bongbong Marcos appointed Abdulraof Macacua as the second interim chief minister of Bangsamoro on March 3, 2025 and will succeed Murad Ebrahim. He is expected to serve until the first regular 2026 Bangsamoro Parliament election. He took oath before Marcos on March 12, 2025. Macacua also returns as a member of parliament.

His appointment was questioned by the Moro Islamic Liberation Front through its editorial on its Luwaran newspaper alleging Marcos violated the Bangsamoro Organic Law by appointing an interim chief minister not on the official list proposed by the former rebel group. Macacua was an MILF nominee for member of parliament but not as chief minister. In June 2026, the MILF suspended Macacua as head of the BIAF, citing his declarations and decisions that were "inconsistent with the political line and collective decisions of the MILF leadership".

Macacua's tasks include overseeing the reallocation of the parliamentary districts for Sulu, a province excluded from the autonomous region by a Supreme Court decision in 2024. Macacua has pledged to mend ties with the larger MILF organization. On January 20, 2026, Macacua signed into law Bangsamoro Autonomy Act No. 86, which reconfigured the number of seats in the Bangsamoro Parliament on account of the exclusion of Sulu.

Macacua issued memorandum circular no. 7 on June 23, 2025 for all appointed and designated ministers, deputy ministers, and heads of offices and agencies to tender their courtesy resignations. He took the interior ministry portfolio on July 22, 2025 after he accepted the courtesy resignation of Sha Elijah Dumama-Alba of the Ministry of the Interior and Local Government a day prior.

On August 14, 2026, Macacua's convoy was fired upon by unidentified assailants in Datu Odin Sinsuat, Maguindanao del Norte as he was returning from Kabuntalan, where he attended a ceremony marking his assumption of the leadership of the Bangsamoro Federalist Party. No injuries were recorded.

In the 2026 Bangsamoro Parliament election, he was elected as representative of Maguindanao del Norte's 3rd district with 79.3% of the vote against Badrudin Mamad.

==== Regular tenure (2026–present) ====
In the lead up to the convening of the 1st Bangsamoro Parliament, Macacua began the process of forming his government. By October 16, 2026, he claims to secure the support of at least 46 of the incoming members of parliament. He also garnered support from influential figures in the Bangsamoro. He received the backing of five provincial governors, as well as the endorsement of Moro National Liberation Front leader Nur Misuari.

The first parliament convened on October 30, 2026. Kitem Kadatuan nominated Macacua for the role of chief minister with Mohagher Iqbal nominating Murad Ebrahim as his rival. Macacua won the election within the parliament, garnering 51 votes with Ebrahim getting 27 votes. One member present abstained and another was absent.

== Personal life ==
Abdulraof Macacua is married to Guianima Balang with whom he has seven children; four boys and three girls.

== Electoral history ==
Electoral history of Abdulraof Macacua
Year	Office	Party	Votes received				Result
Year	Office	Party	Total	%	P.	Swing	Result
2026	Member of the Bangsamoro Parliament (Maguindanao del Norte–3rd)	Independent	37,483	79.27%	1st	—N/a	Won
