= Murad Ebrahim =

Philippine politician

Al Haj Murad Ebrahim مراد ابرهیم
- Official portrait, 2026

Member of the Bangsamoro Parliament
- Incumbent
- Assumed office October 30, 2026

Interim Chief Minister of Bangsamoro
- In office February 22, 2019 – March 3, 2025
- President: Rodrigo Duterte; Bongbong Marcos
- Deputy: Ali Solaiman (Mainland); Albakil Jikiri (Islands)
- Wa'lī: Khalipa Usman Nando; Omarkhalid Ampatuan; Said Salendab; Muslim Guiamaden
- Preceded by: Mujiv Hataman (Governor of the Autonomous Region in Muslim Mindanao)
- Succeeded by: Abdulraof Macacua

Member of the Bangsamoro Transition Authority Parliament
- In office March 29, 2019 – March 2025
Ministerial offices
Minister of Public Works
In office February 26, 2019 – November 11, 2019
Preceded by	Position established
Succeeded by	Eduard Guerra
Minister of Finance
In office November 11, 2019 – February 8, 2022
Preceded by	Eduard Guerra
Succeeded by	Ubaida Pacasem

Personal details
- Born: Ahod Balawag Ebrahim; May 15, 1949 (age 77) Cotabato, Philippines
- Party: UBJP
- Education: Notre Dame University
- Nickname: Murad

Military service
- Allegiance: Moro National Liberation Front (MNLF); Moro Islamic Liberation Front (MILF)
- Years of service: 1968–1977 (MNLF); 1977–present (MILF)

Ahod Balawag Ebrahim (Maguindanaon pronunciation: [ahʊd balaːwag ɪbrahiːm]; Jawi: احد بلاوݢ ابرهیم; born May 15, 1949), better known as Al Haj Murad Ebrahim, is a Moro Filipino politician and former rebel leader who served as the first interim chief minister of the Bangsamoro Autonomous Region in Muslim Mindanao.

As the current chairman of the Moro Islamic Liberation Front, a Moro regionalist and Islamist armed group in the southern Philippines, Ebrahim is a key figure in the Bangsamoro Peace Process in the Philippines.

== Early life and education ==
Born on 15 May 1949, Murad Ebrahim was born to an Islamic preacher. He lost both of his parents at a young age; his mother when he was just one year old and his father when he was 13 years old. He is the youngest among four children.

Ebrahim started his elementary studies when he was seven years old and completed the six-year program in five years. He entered the Cotabato Public High School in Cotabato City for his high school studies in 1960. After graduating from high school, Ebrahim enrolled at the Mindanao State University in Marawi under a scholarship but transferred to the Notre Dame University in Cotabato City in his second year after passing the entrance examination. He was granted a scholarship in Notre Dame by the Commission on National Integration (CIN) and pursued a course on civil engineering. However he stopped his studies in his fifth and final year in college in 1970 to get more involved in the Moro movement.

== Militant career ==
=== Moro National Liberation Front ===
Murad dropped out of college to join the underground movement which fought against Christian paramilitary groups and security forces during the administration of then-president Ferdinand Marcos allegedly targeting Muslims. He adopted "Murad" as his nom de guerre when he joined the Moro resistance against the government. Ebrahim first got involved in the underground Moro secessionist movement as early as 1968 prior to fully committing in 1970.

He was recruited into the Moro National Liberation Front (MNLF) in 1968 and was part of the "Top 300", a second batch of MNLF trainees sent to Malaysia. He was appointed a zonal commander with his area of assignment covering 15 municipalities.

Ebrahim led the group's Kutawato Revolutionary Committee in fighting against government forces and the Ilaga paramilitary group in Central Mindanao. He was Military Chairman of Kutawato from 1974 until 1978 when he was promoted as Region Chairman. When Hashim Salamat organized a faction within the MNLF, Ebrahim was appointed chairman of the Ad Hoc Coordinating Committee to lead the faction's activities in Mindanao, while Salamat is abroad.

=== Moro Islamic Liberation Front ===
Murad left the MNLF due to ideological differences along with Hashim Salamat who formed the Moro Islamic Liberation Front (MILF). In the 1980s, Ebrahim went to Afghanistan to meet with Filipino rebels fighting against the forces of the Soviet Union amid the Soviet–Afghan War though he said has not fought alongside them. There he also met Osama bin Laden, who would later become the head of Al-Qaeda describing him as a soft-spoken and refined man who would have never thought to be declared "a world enemy".

He developed a reputation within the MILF as one of its top guerrilla commanders. He served as vice chair for military affairs and as chief of staff of the Bangsamoro Islamic Armed Forces, the armed wing of the MILF before he was appointed as MILF chairman in mid-2003 to replace MILF founder Salamat who died within the same year. He also served as the group's chief negotiator in talks with the Philippine national government.

== Interim chief minister ==
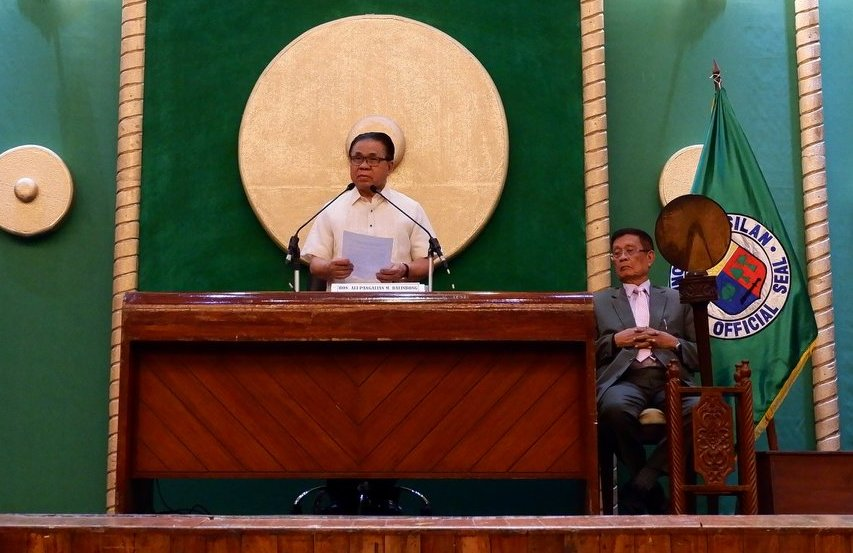
Ebrahim presiding over the Bangsamoro Parliament as chief minister

Upon the passage of the Bangsamoro Organic Law (BOL) in 2018 under the administration of President Rodrigo Duterte, Murad Ebrahim campaigned for the law's ratification by voters that would lead to the establishment of the proposed Bangsamoro Autonomous Region. He was nominated by his group, the MILF, to be the chief minister of the Bangsamoro Transition Authority (BTA) which would serve as the interim government in the region.

On February 22, 2019, Ebrahim was appointed and sworn in by Duterte as the interim chief minister of the newly formed Bangsamoro Autonomous Region in Muslim Mindanao (BARMM). He leads the 80-member BTA, which will govern the five-province Bangsamoro region. Scheduled elections for the new members for the region's parliament took place in 2022.

At the official turnover of the ARMM to BARMM on February 26, 2019, Ebrahim announced the members of the first Bangsamoro Cabinet, with himself as concurrent minister of public works and highways. On November 11, 2019, he transferred his duties as public works minister to Finance Minister Eduard Guerra, while placing the finance ministry under the chief minister's supervision.

His government pursued a policy of promoting "moral governance", which Ebrahim says based on "moral values of Islam" as a response to corruption and failed governance in the former ARMM.

On February 8, 2022, Ebrahim ordered the ministers and their deputies of his cabinet to tender courtesy resignation while the director general of each ministry were directed to temporarily take over. This marked the end of Ebrahim's tenure as concurrent finance minister and was succeeded by Ubaida Pacasem who took their oath on March 14, 2022.

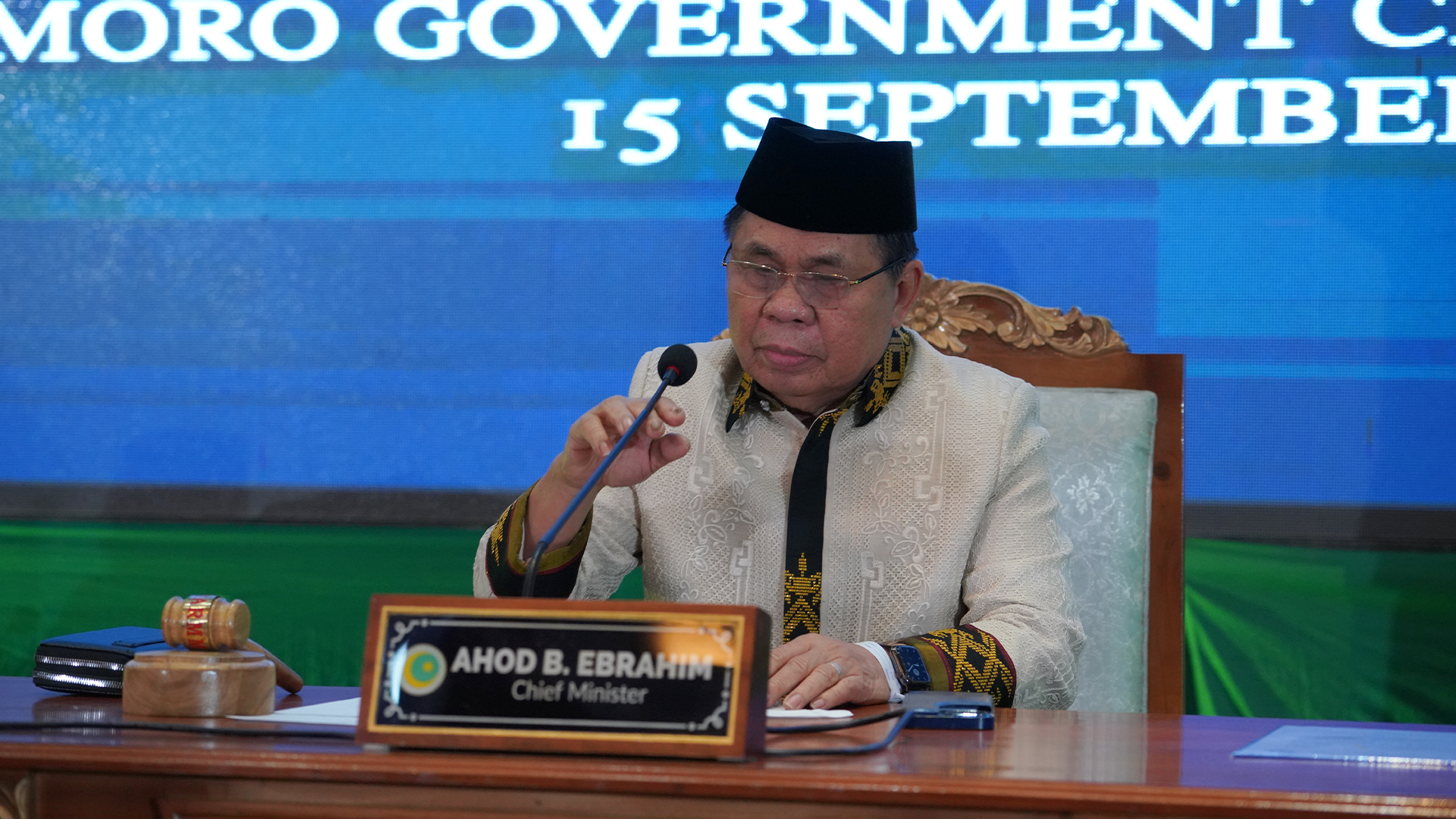
Ebrahim in September 2022

Ebrahim retained his position as interim Chief Minister when President Bongbong Marcos appointed a new set of members for the BTA in August 2022.

Amid former President Duterte's call for the secession of Mindanao from the Philippines in January 2024, Ebrahim released a statement expressing support for the incumbent administration of President Marcos and declared himself committed to the peace process and setting the foundation of an autonomous Bangsamoro region.

Ebrahim reportedly resigned as chief minister on March 3, 2025, to focus on the campaign for the October 2025 Bangsamoro Parliament election. His successor, Abdulraof Macacua's appointment has been questioned within the MILF. Following his resignation, Ebrahim declined an offer from President Marcos to take a seat as a regular member of parliament in the transitional legislature. In September 2025, Ebrahim clarified he was removed as Chief Minister before resigning as a regular member of parliament.

== Personal life ==
Al Haj Murad Ebrahim is married to Hadja Lupia Ebrahim, with whom he has two children. One of them, Mansor, was elected as MP for the 1st District of the Special Geographic Area in the 2026 Bangsamoro Parliament election.

On March 14, 2015, controversy on the citizenship of Murad arose when Philippine former interior secretary Rafael Alunan III accused him of being a citizen of Malaysia. This allegation was denied by Malaysia and fellow MILF member Mohagher Iqbal.
