= 2025 Philippine local elections in Bangsamoro =

- May 12, 2025
- Gubernatorial elections
- 5 provincial governors and 1 city mayor
Party	Seats	+/–
PFP	2	New
BUP	1	New
Lakas	1	0
PDP–Laban	1	−1
UBJP	1	0
This lists parties that won seats. See the complete results below.
- Vice gubernatorial elections
- 5 provincial vice governors and 1 city vice mayor
Party	Seats	+/–
UBJP	3	+2
PFP	2	New
Lakas	1	0
This lists parties that won seats. See the complete results below.
- Provincial Board elections
- 48 provincial board members and 10 city councilors
Party	Seats	+/–
PFP	19	+19
UBJP	18	+8
Lakas	10	+4
Nacionalista	4	−4
BUP	3	+2
PDP–Laban	1	−18
Independent	3	+3
This lists parties that won seats. See the complete results below.

The 2025 Philippine local elections in Bangsamoro were held on May 12, 2025.

== Summary ==
=== Governors ===
Province/city	Incumbent	Incumbent's party	Winner	Winner's party	Winning margin
Basilan	Hadjiman Hataman Salliman	PFP	Mujiv Hataman	BUP	1.36%
Cotabato City (ICC)	Bruce Matabalao	UBJP	Bruce Matabalao	UBJP	19.45%
Lanao del Sur	Mamintal Adiong Jr.	Lakas	Mamintal Adiong Jr.	Lakas	41.36%
Maguindanao del Norte	Sharifudin Mastura	PFP	Tucao Mastura	PFP	44.60%
Maguindanao del Sur	Mariam Mangudadatu	Nacionalista	Ali Midtimbang	PFP	6.22%
Tawi-Tawi	Yshmael Sali	PDP–Laban	Yshmael Sali	PDP–Laban	35.74%

=== Vice governors ===
Province/city	Incumbent	Incumbent's party	Winner	Winner's party	Winning margin
Basilan	Yusop Alano	PFP	Hadjiman Hataman Salliman	PFP	32.52%
Cotabato City (ICC)	Butch Abu	Lakas	Johair Madag	UBJP	7.37%
Lanao del Sur	Mujam Adiong	Lakas	Mujam Adiong	Lakas	39.23%
Maguindanao del Norte	Abdulnasser Abas	UBJP	Marshall Sinsuat	UBJP	46.46%
Maguindanao del Sur	Nathaneil Midtimbang	PFP	Hisham Nando	UBJP	14.06%
Tawi-Tawi	Al-Syed Sali	PFP	Al-Syed Sali	PFP	53.92%

=== Provincial boards ===
Province/city	Seats	Party control		Composition
Province/city	Seats	Previous	Result	Composition
Basilan	10 elected 4 ex-officio	No majority	No majority	PFP (5); BUP (3); Lakas (1); Independent (1)
Cotabato City (ICC)	10 elected 4 ex-officio	No majority	UBJP	UBJP (10)
Lanao del Sur	10 elected 3 ex-officio	No majority	Lakas	Lakas (8); UBJP (1); PFP (1)
Maguindanao del Norte	8 elected 4 ex-officio	New provincial board	No majority	UBJP (4); PFP (3); Lakas (1)
Maguindanao del Sur	10 elected 4 ex-officio	New provincial board	No majority	Nacionalista (4); PFP (3); UBJP (3)
Tawi-Tawi	10 elected 6 ex-officio	No majority	No majority	PFP (7); PDP–Laban (1); Independent (2)

== Basilan ==
=== Governor ===
Term-limited incumbent Governor Hadjiman Hataman Salliman of the Partido Federal ng Pilipinas (PFP) ran for vice governor of Basilan. He was previously affiliated with PDP–Laban.

The PFP nominated Salliman's son, provincial board member Jay Hataman Salliman, who was defeated by his uncle, representative Mujiv Hataman of the Basilan Unity Party. Osama Mutamad (Partido para sa Demokratikong Reporma) also ran for governor.

Candidate	Party	Votes	%
Mujiv Hataman	Basilan Unity Party	121,829	50.50
Jay Hataman Salliman	Partido Federal ng Pilipinas	118,554	49.14
Osama Mutamad	Partido para sa Demokratikong Reporma	856	0.35
Total		241,239	100.00
Valid votes		241,239	96.07
Invalid/blank votes		9,869	3.93
Total votes		251,108	100.00
Registered voters/turnout		315,601	79.57
BUP gain from PFP			
Source: Commission on Elections

=== Vice Governor ===
Term-limited incumbent Vice Governor Yusop Alano of the Partido Federal ng Pilipinas (PFP) ran for the House of Representatives in Basilan's lone legislative district. He was previously affiliated with PDP–Laban.

The PFP nominated Basilan governor Hadjiman Hataman Salliman, who ran against former Bangsamoro member of parliament Alzad Sattar (Basilan Unity Party).

Candidate	Party	Votes	%
Hadjiman Hataman Salliman	Partido Federal ng Pilipinas	151,236	66.26
Alzad Sattar	Basilan Unity Party	76,998	33.74
Total		228,234	100.00
Valid votes		228,234	90.89
Invalid/blank votes		22,874	9.11
Total votes		251,108	100.00
Registered voters/turnout		315,601	79.57
PFP hold			
Source: Commission on Elections

=== Provincial Board ===
Since Basilan's reclassification as a 1st class province in 2025, the Basilan Provincial Board is composed of 14 board members, 10 of whom are elected.

The Partido Federal ng Pilipinas won five seats, becoming the largest party in the provincial board.

Party	Votes	%	Seats	+/–
Partido Federal ng Pilipinas	514,638	51.84	5	New
Basilan Unity Party	286,563	28.87	3	+2
Lakas–CMD	71,039	7.16	1	New
PDP–Laban	19,524	1.97	0	–6
Independent	100,920	10.17	1	+1
Total	992,684	100.00	10	+2
Total votes	251,108	–		
Registered voters/turnout	315,601	79.57		
Source: Commission on Elections

==== 1st district ====
Basilan's 1st provincial district is composed of the city of Isabela and the municipalities of Hadji Muhtamad, Lantawan and Maluso. Four board members are elected from this provincial district.

Nine candidates were included in the ballot.

Candidate	Party	Votes	%
Nasser Salain (incumbent)	Partido Federal ng Pilipinas	65,141	19.03
Allet Ismael (incumbent)	Partido Federal ng Pilipinas	56,426	16.49
Amin Hataman (incumbent)	Basilan Unity Party	49,987	14.60
Faigdar Jaafar	Basilan Unity Party	47,836	13.98
Bimbo Epping	Basilan Unity Party	38,454	11.23
Alan Ritchie Luis Biel	Partido Federal ng Pilipinas	37,591	10.98
Ramly Amping	Partido Federal ng Pilipinas	32,361	9.45
Nur Hakimin	Basilan Unity Party	10,913	3.19
Patta Hadjirul	Independent	3,568	1.04
Total		342,277	100.00
Total votes		105,905	–
Registered voters/turnout		145,976	72.55
Source: Commission on Elections

==== 2nd district ====
Basilan's 2nd provincial district is composed of the city of Lamitan and the municipalities of Akbar, Al-Barka, Hadji Mohammad Ajul, Sumisip, Tabuan-Lasa, Tipo-Tipo, Tuburan and Ungkaya Pukan. Six board members are elected from this provincial district.

11 candidates were included in the ballot.

Candidate	Party	Votes	%
Miko Asarul	Partido Federal ng Pilipinas	89,913	13.82
Nur-Khan Istarul	Partido Federal ng Pilipinas	89,627	13.78
Keemhar Jay Sakkalahul	Partido Federal ng Pilipinas	88,586	13.62
Ronie Hantian	Basilan Unity Party	83,583	12.85
Nur-in Akbar	Lakas–CMD	71,039	10.92
Juhan Hataman	Independent	62,182	9.56
Najib Hataman	Basilan Unity Party	55,790	8.58
Marwan Hataman (incumbent)	Partido Federal ng Pilipinas	54,993	8.46
Kasim Idris	Independent	35,170	5.41
James Dinil	PDP–Laban	16,787	2.58
Shing Jalil	PDP–Laban	2,737	0.42
Total		650,407	100.00
Total votes		145,203	–
Registered voters/turnout		169,625	85.60
Source: Commission on Elections

== Cotabato City ==
=== Mayor ===
Incumbent Mayor Bruce Matabalao of the United Bangsamoro Justice Party ran for a second term.

Matabalao won re-election against Cotabato City vice mayor Butch Abu (Lakas–CMD), former Cotabato City mayor Cynthia Guiani-Sayadi (Nationalist People's Coalition), and Hailah Dilangalen (Independent).

Candidate	Party	Votes	%
Bruce Matabalao (incumbent)	United Bangsamoro Justice Party	45,578	52.35
Butch Abu	Lakas–CMD	28,642	32.90
Cynthia Guiani-Sayadi	Nationalist People's Coalition	12,688	14.57
Hailah Dilangalen	Independent	153	0.18
Total		87,061	100.00
Valid votes		87,061	97.09
Invalid/blank votes		2,612	2.91
Total votes		89,673	100.00
Registered voters/turnout		135,999	65.94
UBJP hold			
Source: Commission on Elections

=== Vice Mayor ===
Incumbent Vice Mayor Butch Abu of Lakas–CMD ran for mayor of Cotabato City. He was previously affiliated with the United Bangsamoro Justice Party.

Lakas–CMD nominated Barangay Kalanganan Mother chairman Bimbo Pasawiran, who was defeated by former Barangay Poblacion 2 chairman Johair Madag of the United Bangsamoro Justice Party. City councilor Jayjay Guiani (Nationalist People's Coalition) also ran for mayor.

Candidate	Party	Votes	%
Johair Madag	United Bangsamoro Justice Party	38,528	45.09
Bimbo Pasawiran	Lakas–CMD	32,233	37.72
Jayjay Guiani	Nationalist People's Coalition	14,683	17.18
Total		85,444	100.00
Valid votes		85,444	95.28
Invalid/blank votes		4,229	4.72
Total votes		89,673	100.00
Registered voters/turnout		135,999	65.94
UBJP gain from Lakas			
Source: Commission on Elections

=== City Council ===
The Cotabato City Council is composed of 14 councilors, 10 of whom are elected.

40 candidates were included in the ballot.

The United Bangsamoro Justice Party won 10 seats, gaining a majority in the city council.

Party	Votes	%	Seats	+/–
United Bangsamoro Justice Party	333,377	47.17	10	+3
Lakas–CMD	259,995	36.79	0	New
Nationalist People's Coalition	72,718	10.29	0	–3
Independent	40,663	5.75	0	0
Total	706,753	100.00	10	0
Total votes	89,673	–		
Registered voters/turnout	135,999	65.94		
Source: Commission on Elections

Candidate	Party	Votes	%
Popoy Formento (incumbent)	United Bangsamoro Justice Party	41,350	5.85
Jonas Mohammad	United Bangsamoro Justice Party	36,352	5.14
Datu Raiz Sema	United Bangsamoro Justice Party	34,591	4.89
Michael Datumanong	United Bangsamoro Justice Party	34,162	4.83
Anwar Malang	United Bangsamoro Justice Party	33,868	4.79
Faidz Edzla	United Bangsamoro Justice Party	31,890	4.51
Guiadzuri Midtimbang II (incumbent)	United Bangsamoro Justice Party	31,532	4.46
Mohamad Ali Mangelen	United Bangsamoro Justice Party	30,775	4.35
Joven Pangilan	United Bangsamoro Justice Party	29,632	4.19
Shalimar Candao	United Bangsamoro Justice Party	29,225	4.14
Hunyn Abu (incumbent)	Lakas–CMD	28,362	4.01
Baby Ayunan	Lakas–CMD	27,907	3.95
Marouf Pasawiran (incumbent)	Lakas–CMD	27,032	3.82
Suk Sema	Lakas–CMD	26,978	3.82
Norhassim Sinarimbo	Lakas–CMD	26,327	3.73
Freddie Ridao	Lakas–CMD	25,573	3.62
Kusin Taha (incumbent)	Lakas–CMD	24,900	3.52
Gabby Usman (incumbent)	Lakas–CMD	24,558	3.47
Henjie Ali (incumbent)	Lakas–CMD	24,206	3.42
Bobby Katambak	Lakas–CMD	24,152	3.42
Bai Lorna Ebrahim	Independent	12,467	1.76
Eduardo Rabago	Nationalist People's Coalition	11,528	1.63
Danda Juanday (incumbent)	Nationalist People's Coalition	11,051	1.56
Henry Macion	Nationalist People's Coalition	10,319	1.46
Analie Anastacio	Independent	8,230	1.16
Dumugkao Mangelen	Nationalist People's Coalition	7,505	1.06
Hervy Emberga	Nationalist People's Coalition	7,004	0.99
Romeo Lidasan	Nationalist People's Coalition	7,000	0.99
Sukarno Utto	Nationalist People's Coalition	6,926	0.98
Christina Chua	Independent	6,344	0.90
Alshamir Santiago	Nationalist People's Coalition	4,491	0.64
Abdullah Sekak	Nationalist People's Coalition	3,934	0.56
Dick Garcia	Independent	3,227	0.46
Moksal Lokua	Nationalist People's Coalition	2,960	0.42
Kagui Hammed Maguing	Independent	2,882	0.41
Macmod Guiapar	Independent	2,415	0.34
Naut Usman	Independent	1,756	0.25
Arman Aman	Independent	1,330	0.19
James Guiaman	Independent	1,049	0.15
Parido Pigkaulan	Independent	963	0.14
Total		706,753	100.00
Total votes		89,673	–
Registered voters/turnout		135,999	65.94
Source: Commission on Elections

== Lanao del Sur ==
=== Governor ===
Incumbent Governor Mamintal Adiong Jr. of Lakas–CMD ran for a third term.

Adiong won re-election against Fiat Macarambon (United Bangsamoro Justice Party).

Candidate	Party	Votes	%
Mamintal Adiong Jr. (incumbent)	Lakas–CMD	382,050	70.68
Fiat Macarambon	United Bangsamoro Justice Party	158,483	29.32
Total		540,533	100.00
Valid votes		540,533	94.42
Invalid/blank votes		31,919	5.58
Total votes		572,452	100.00
Registered voters/turnout		706,919	80.98
Lakas hold			
Source: Commission on Elections

=== Vice Governor ===
Incumbent Vice Governor Mujam Adiong of Lakas–CMD is running for a third term.

Adiong won re-election against Bangsamoro member of parliament Marjanie Macasalong (United Bangsamoro Justice Party), and Mansawi Mimbalawag (Reform PH Party).

Candidate	Party	Votes	%
Mujam Adiong (incumbent)	Lakas–CMD	363,949	68.83
Marjanie Macasalong	United Bangsamoro Justice Party	156,534	29.60
Mansawi Mimbalawag	Reform PH Party	8,266	1.56
Total		528,749	100.00
Valid votes		528,749	92.37
Invalid/blank votes		43,703	7.63
Total votes		572,452	100.00
Registered voters/turnout		706,919	80.98
Lakas hold			
Source: Commission on Elections

=== Provincial Board ===
The Lanao del Sur Provincial Board is composed of 13 board members, 10 of whom are elected.

Lakas–CMD won eight seats, gaining a majority in the provincial board.

Party	Votes	%	Seats	+/–
Lakas–CMD	1,078,346	51.87	8	+2
United Bangsamoro Justice Party	384,583	18.50	1	New
Partido Federal ng Pilipinas	345,279	16.61	1	+1
Serbisyong Inklusibo–Alyansang Progresibo	87,251	4.20	0	New
Ompia Party	84,916	4.08	0	New
Nacionalista Party	48,320	2.32	0	0
Liberal Party	29,739	1.43	0	0
Independent	20,415	0.98	0	0
Total	2,078,849	100.00	10	0
Total votes	572,452	–		
Registered voters/turnout	706,919	80.98		
Source: Commission on Elections

==== 1st district ====
Lanao del Sur's 1st provincial district consists of the same area as Lanao del Sur's 1st legislative district. Five board members are elected from this provincial district.

14 candidates were included in the ballot.

Candidate	Party	Votes	%
Edmund Capal	Lakas–CMD	161,431	13.98
Ringo Gandamra (incumbent)	Lakas–CMD	141,829	12.29
Alilit Sani (incumbent)	Lakas–CMD	129,360	11.21
Omar-Ali Sharief	Partido Federal ng Pilipinas	122,405	10.60
Jolo Marohombsar	Lakas–CMD	118,673	10.28
Nash Ganda (incumbent)	Lakas–CMD	104,384	9.04
Alim Marangit	Partido Federal ng Pilipinas	90,668	7.85
Abuarham Abdulkareem	United Bangsamoro Justice Party	70,907	6.14
Ahlan Sharief	United Bangsamoro Justice Party	64,166	5.56
Amba Ampaso	Nacionalista Party	48,320	4.19
Omar Amatonding	Partido Federal ng Pilipinas	36,090	3.13
Jafaar Malo Balenti	Partido Federal ng Pilipinas	29,468	2.55
Padel Hassan	United Bangsamoro Justice Party	27,848	2.41
Salic Sultan	Independent	8,922	0.77
Total		1,154,471	100.00
Total votes		328,342	–
Registered voters/turnout		403,831	81.31
Source: Commission on Elections

==== 2nd district ====
Lanao del Sur's 2nd provincial district consists of the same area as Lanao del Sur's 2nd legislative district. Five board members are elected from this provincial district.

18 candidates were included in the ballot.

Candidate	Party	Votes	%
Daongan Amerbitor	Lakas–CMD	107,247	11.60
Frank Marohom	Lakas–CMD	100,530	10.88
Fahad Arimao (incumbent)	United Bangsamoro Justice Party	90,857	9.83
Aldine Macarambon	Lakas–CMD	90,665	9.81
Taha-Tanjie Macapodi (incumbent)	Lakas–CMD	88,096	9.53
Abdullah Pacalna	Serbisyong Inklusibo–Alyansang Progresibo	87,251	9.44
Abdulwafie Balindong	United Bangsamoro Justice Party	70,165	7.59
Usman Abutasnima	Partido Federal ng Pilipinas	49,016	5.30
Arpha Sarip	Ompia Party	43,894	4.75
Mohammad Ampaso	Ompia Party	41,022	4.44
Bubuly Decampong (incumbent)	Lakas–CMD	36,131	3.91
Mohammad Ali	United Bangsamoro Justice Party	33,614	3.64
Johar Dimaporo	Liberal Party	29,739	3.22
Abudarda Amer	United Bangsamoro Justice Party	27,026	2.92
Ansary Maongco	Partido Federal ng Pilipinas	17,632	1.91
Ibrahim Abedin	Independent	5,353	0.58
JM Malatus	Independent	3,775	0.41
Noroding Ibrahim	Independent	2,365	0.26
Total		924,378	100.00
Total votes		244,110	–
Registered voters/turnout		303,088	80.54
Source: Commission on Elections

== Maguindanao del Norte ==
=== Governor ===
Incumbent Governor Sharifudin Mastura of the Partido Federal ng Pilipinas (PFP) retired. He became governor on March 27, 2025, after Abdulraof Macacua became the Chief Minister of Bangsamoro.

The PFP nominated Mastura's father, Sultan Kudarat mayor Tucao Mastura, who won the election against former Technical Education and Skills Development Authority director general Suharto Mangudadatu (Al Ittahad–UKB Party).

Candidate	Party	Votes	%
Tucao Mastura	Partido Federal ng Pilipinas	199,049	72.30
Suharto Mangudadatu	Al Ittahad–UKB Party	76,260	27.70
Total		275,309	100.00
Valid votes		275,309	95.83
Invalid/blank votes		11,976	4.17
Total votes		287,285	100.00
Registered voters/turnout		394,527	72.82
PFP hold			
Source: Commission on Elections

=== Vice Governor ===
Incumbent Vice Governor Abdulnasser Abas of the United Bangsamoro Justice Party (UBJP) ran for the Bangsamoro Parliament in Maguindanao del Norte's 4th regional district. He became vice governor on March 26, 2024, after Ainee Sinsuat resigned.

The UBJP nominated Datu Blah T. Sinsuat mayor Marshall Sinsuat, who won the election against former Maguindanao del Norte vice governor Ainee Sinsuat (Partido Federal ng Pilipinas).

Candidate	Party	Votes	%
Marshall Sinsuat	United Bangsamoro Justice Party	198,233	73.23
Ainee Sinsuat	Partido Federal ng Pilipinas	72,461	26.77
Total		270,694	100.00
Valid votes		270,694	94.22
Invalid/blank votes		16,591	5.78
Total votes		287,285	100.00
Registered voters/turnout		394,527	72.82
UBJP hold			
Source: Commission on Elections

=== Provincial Board ===
Since Maguindanao del Norte's reclassification as a 4th class province in 2025, Maguindanao del Norte Provincial Board is composed of 12 board members, eight of whom are elected.

The United Bangsamoro Justice Party won four seats, becoming the largest party in the provincial board.

Party	Votes	%	Seats
Partido Federal ng Pilipinas	294,918	33.90	3
United Bangsamoro Justice Party	253,090	29.09	4
Al Ittahad–UKB Party	163,215	18.76	0
Lakas–CMD	82,750	9.51	1
PDP–Laban	15,745	1.81	0
Independent	60,303	6.93	0
Total	870,021	100.00	8
Total votes	287,285	–	
Registered voters/turnout	394,527	72.82	
Source: Commission on Elections

==== 1st district ====
Maguindanao del Norte's 1st provincial district consists of the municipalities of Barira, Buldon, Matanog, Parang, Sultan Kudarat and Sultan Mastura. Four board members are elected from this provincial district.

15 candidates were included in the ballot.

Candidate	Party	Votes	%
Sowaib Ibay	Lakas–CMD	82,750	14.96
Alexa Ashley Tomawis (incumbent)	United Bangsamoro Justice Party	75,662	13.68
Darwin Panga	Partido Federal ng Pilipinas	70,887	12.81
Mashur Biruar (incumbent)	Partido Federal ng Pilipinas	69,949	12.64
Abdul Moamar Manalao	Partido Federal ng Pilipinas	57,169	10.33
Bocari Dagalangit	Partido Federal ng Pilipinas	40,042	7.24
Nashedden Imam	Independent	38,133	6.89
Soraida Ampatuan	Al Ittahad–UKB Party	35,072	6.34
Michael Tomawis	Al Ittahad–UKB Party	26,429	4.78
Armando Lidasan	Al Ittahad–UKB Party	23,824	4.31
Julhani Tumbas Jr.	Independent	11,702	2.11
Jamel Macacua	Partido Federal ng Pilipinas	8,327	1.51
Yacob Gumander	Independent	7,372	1.33
Dodong Esmael	PDP–Laban	5,212	0.94
Zenaida Sigayan	Independent	757	0.14
Total		553,287	100.00
Total votes		177,493	–
Registered voters/turnout		208,290	85.21
Source: Commission on Elections

==== 2nd district ====
Maguindanao del Norte's 2nd provincial district consists of the municipalities of Datu Blah T. Sinsuat, Datu Odin Sinsuat, Kabuntalan, Northern Kabuntalan, Talitay and Upi. Four board members are elected from this provincial district.

Nine candidates were included in the ballot.

Candidate	Party	Votes	%
Lannie Diocolano	United Bangsamoro Justice Party	71,940	22.71
Michael Kida	United Bangsamoro Justice Party	55,463	17.51
Ali Bayam	United Bangsamoro Justice Party	50,025	15.79
Babydatu Sinsuat	Partido Federal ng Pilipinas	48,544	15.33
Jameel Sinsuat	Al Ittahad–UKB Party	29,584	9.34
Rommel Sinsuat (incumbent)	Al Ittahad–UKB Party	26,126	8.25
Naima Manan-Ameril	Al Ittahad–UKB Party	22,180	7.00
Abraham Samad	PDP–Laban	10,533	3.33
Madki Acbar	Independent	2,339	0.74
Total		316,734	100.00
Total votes		109,792	–
Registered voters/turnout		186,237	58.95
Source: Commission on Elections

== Maguindanao del Sur ==
=== Governor ===
Incumbent Governor Mariam Mangudadatu of the Nacionalista Party ran for a full term. She was appointed as governor by President Bongbong Marcos on April 28, 2023, following Maguindanao del Sur's creation in 2022.

Mangudadatu was defeated by former Talayan mayor Ali Midtimbang of the Partido Federal ng Pilipinas.

Candidate	Party	Votes	%
Ali Midtimbang	Partido Federal ng Pilipinas	180,945	53.11
Mariam Mangudadatu (incumbent)	Nacionalista Party	159,746	46.89
Total		340,691	100.00
Valid votes		340,691	96.22
Invalid/blank votes		13,377	3.78
Total votes		354,068	100.00
Registered voters/turnout		451,687	78.39
PFP gain from Nacionalista			
Source: Commission on Elections

=== Vice Governor ===
Incumbent Vice Governor Nathaniel Midtimbang of the Partido Federal ng Pilipinas ran for mayor of Datu Anggal Midtimbang. He was appointed as vice governor by President Bongbong Marcos on April 28, 2023, following Maguindanao del Sur's creation in 2022.

Midtimbang endorsed Hisham Nando (United Bangsamoro Justice Party), son of former Wa'lī of Bangsamoro Khalipha Nando, won the election against Mamasapano vice mayor Benzar Ampatuan (Nacionalista Party).

Candidate	Party	Votes	%
Hisham Nando	United Bangsamoro Justice Party	188,092	57.03
Benzar Ampatuan	Nacionalista Party	141,734	42.97
Total		329,826	100.00
Valid votes		329,826	93.15
Invalid/blank votes		24,242	6.85
Total votes		354,068	100.00
Registered voters/turnout		451,687	78.39
UBJP gain from Nacionalista			
Source: Commission on Elections

=== Provincial Board ===
The Maguindanao del Sur Provincial Board is composed of 14 board members, 10 of whom are elected.

The Nacionalista Party won four seats, becoming the largest party in the provincial board.

Party	Votes	%	Seats
Nacionalista Party	603,493	48.20	4
Partido Federal ng Pilipinas	357,580	28.56	3
United Bangsamoro Justice Party	278,137	22.21	3
Independent	12,816	1.02	0
Total	1,252,026	100.00	10
Total votes	354,068	–	
Registered voters/turnout	451,687	78.39	
Source: Commission on Elections

==== 1st district ====
Maguindanao del Sur's 1st provincial district consists of the municipalities of Datu Anggal Midtimbang, Datu Hoffer Ampatuan, Datu Piang, Datu Salibo, Datu Saudi Ampatuan, Datu Unsay, Guindulungan, Mamasapano, Shariff Aguak, Shariff Saydona Mustapha, South Upi and Talayan. Five board members are elected from this provincial district.

11 candidates were included in the ballot.

Candidate	Party	Votes	%
Kahal Kedtag	United Bangsamoro Justice Party	72,021	13.55
Puti Ampatuan	Partido Federal ng Pilipinas	67,627	12.72
Norodin Ampatuan	Partido Federal ng Pilipinas	65,757	12.37
Sapak Midtimbang	Partido Federal ng Pilipinas	63,786	12.00
Zahara Ampatuan	Nacionalista Party	57,481	10.82
Jeng Macapendeg (incumbent)	Nacionalista Party	56,187	10.57
Macmod Tuan	Partido Federal ng Pilipinas	52,984	9.97
Princess Midtimbang	Nacionalista Party	42,769	8.05
Taharudin Mlok	Nacionalista Party	24,823	4.67
Baba Omar	Nacionalista Party	24,819	4.67
Norudin Salik	Independent	3,209	0.60
Total		531,463	100.00
Total votes		159,346	–
Registered voters/turnout		202,684	78.62
Source: Commission on Elections

==== 2nd district ====
Maguindanao del Sur's 2nd provincial district consists of the municipalities of Ampatuan, Buluan, Datu Abdullah Sangki, Datu Montawal, Datu Paglas, General Salipada K. Pendatun, Mangudadatu, Pagalungan, Paglat, Pandag, Rajah Buayan and Sultan sa Barongis. Five board members are elected from this provincial district.

13 candidates were included in the ballot.

Candidate	Party	Votes	%
Yussef Abubakar Paglas (incumbent)	Nacionalista Party	89,965	12.49
Alonto Montawal Bangkulit (incumbent)	Nacionalista Party	88,046	12.22
Said Makakena	Nacionalista Party	78,649	10.91
Faujiah Mangelen	United Bangsamoro Justice Party	77,801	10.80
Rahib Nando	United Bangsamoro Justice Party	76,051	10.55
Mamatanto Mamantal	Nacionalista Party	71,366	9.90
Mansor Makalay	Nacionalista Party	69,388	9.63
Apan Piang	Partido Federal ng Pilipinas	54,887	7.62
Allan Paglas	Partido Federal ng Pilipinas	52,539	7.29
Luminog Delangalen	United Bangsamoro Justice Party	52,264	7.25
Abdullatip Sabpel	Independent	3,970	0.55
Aladen Delna	Independent	3,064	0.43
Mama Guimba	Independent	2,573	0.36
Total		720,563	100.00
Total votes		194,722	–
Registered voters/turnout		249,003	78.20
Source: Commission on Elections

== Tawi-Tawi ==
=== Governor ===
Incumbent Governor of Tawi-Tawi Yshmael Sali of the PDP–Laban ran for a third term. He was previously affiliated with the Tawi-Tawi One Party.

Sali won re-election against former representative Ruby Sahali (Aksyon Demokratiko).

Candidate	Party	Votes	%
Yshmael Sali (incumbent)	PDP–Laban	133,217	67.87
Ruby Sahali	Aksyon Demokratiko	63,078	32.13
Total		196,295	100.00
Valid votes		196,295	97.02
Invalid/blank votes		6,025	2.98
Total votes		202,320	100.00
Registered voters/turnout		255,632	79.15
PDP–Laban hold			
Source: Commission on Elections

=== Vice Governor ===
Incumbent Vice Governor Al-Syed Sali of the Partido Federal ng Pilipinas ran for a second term. He was previously affiliated with the Tawi-Tawi One Party.

Sali won re-election against Algarad Lipae (Aksyon Demokratiko).

Candidate	Party	Votes	%
Al-Syed Sali (incumbent)	Partido Federal ng Pilipinas	142,259	76.96
Algarad Lipae	Aksyon Demokratiko	42,594	23.04
Total		184,853	100.00
Valid votes		184,853	91.37
Invalid/blank votes		17,467	8.63
Total votes		202,320	100.00
Registered voters/turnout		255,632	79.15
PFP hold			
Source: Commission on Elections

=== Provincial Board ===
Since Tawi-Tawi's reclassification as a 1st class province in 2025, the Tawi-Tawi Provincial Board is composed of 16 board members, 10 of whom are elected.

The Partido Federal ng Pilipinas won seven seats, becoming the largest party in the provincial board.

Party	Votes	%	Seats	+/–
Partido Federal ng Pilipinas	357,037	53.52	7	New
Aksyon Demokratiko	122,191	18.32	0	New
PDP–Laban	42,751	6.41	1	+1
Independent	145,149	21.76	2	+2
Total	667,128	100.00	10	+2
Total votes	202,320	–		
Registered voters/turnout	255,632	79.15		
Source: Commission on Elections

==== 1st district ====
Tawi-Tawi's 1st provincial district consists of the municipalities of Bongao, Mapun, Sibutu, Simunul, Sitangkai and Turtle Islands. Six board members are elected from this provincial district.

11 candidates were included in the ballot.

Candidate	Party	Votes	%
Rodel Akip	Independent	67,007	16.38
Mark Renil Samsuya	Partido Federal ng Pilipinas	57,155	13.97
Papay Ladjahali	Partido Federal ng Pilipinas	52,638	12.86
Ershad Abdurahman	Partido Federal ng Pilipinas	52,261	12.77
Tati Ahaja	Partido Federal ng Pilipinas	50,764	12.41
Arron Fhadz Ahamad	PDP–Laban	42,751	10.45
Alnazir Jumdail	Aksyon Demokratiko	25,870	6.32
Patta Tianok Jr.	Aksyon Demokratiko	16,645	4.07
Salim Yusop	Independent	16,311	3.99
Habib Jamal	Aksyon Demokratiko	15,244	3.73
Hansam Pilihan	Aksyon Demokratiko	12,552	3.07
Total		409,198	100.00
Total votes		121,004	–
Registered voters/turnout		161,621	74.87
Source: Commission on Elections

==== 2nd district ====
Tawi-Tawi's 2nd provincial district consists of the municipalities of Languyan, Panglima Sugala, Sapa-Sapa, South Ubian and Tandubas. Four board members are elected from this provincial district.

11 candidates were included in the ballot.

Candidate	Party	Votes	%
Melhan Masdal (incumbent)	Partido Federal ng Pilipinas	46,396	17.99
Alshid Mohammad Ali	Partido Federal ng Pilipinas	37,666	14.60
Jonel Mohammad Monel	Partido Federal ng Pilipinas	35,016	13.58
Alfil Ladjabassal	Independent	34,928	13.54
Jamz Ishmael (incumbent)	Partido Federal ng Pilipinas	25,141	9.75
Mahmud Bawasanta (incumbent)	Independent	20,883	8.10
Al-Khalid Abdulmunap	Aksyon Demokratiko	17,158	6.65
Martin Maing	Aksyon Demokratiko	13,060	5.06
Nasser Habe	Aksyon Demokratiko	11,910	4.62
Yasmin Bawasanta	Aksyon Demokratiko	9,752	3.78
Alano Salih	Independent	6,020	2.33
Total		257,930	100.00
Total votes		81,316	–
Registered voters/turnout		94,011	86.50
Source: Commission on Elections

== Election-related incidents ==
The Philippine National Police said that BARMM has the second-highest number of election-related incidents, with eight cases recorded, while COMELEC designated 90% of the region's municipalities and cities as areas of concern. In April 2025, more than 400 soldiers were redeployed from the Zamboanga Peninsula to Lanao del Sur to enhance security in the province following incidents of violence. In Lanao del Sur and Basilan, 888 police officers were deputized as members of local Special Election Boards. COMELEC also approved the holding of vote canvassing in Maguindanao del Sur to be held at the headquarters of the Philippine Army's Sixth Infantry Division in Datu Odin Sinsuat, Maguindanao del Norte.

On October 8, 2024, clashes between supporters of rival politicians on the last day of candidate registration in Shariff Aguak, Maguindanao del Sur left a barangay watchman dead and six people injured, one of them critically. On October 19, a candidate for councilor in Datu Hoffer Ampatuan, Maguindanao del Sur, was shot dead in an ambush by unidentified suspects that also injured his wife. On December 21, the provincial election supervisor of Sulu survived an ambush that killed his brother in Zamboanga City. On December 25, a petitioner who complained about the presence of flying voters was shot dead in Pualas, Lanao del Sur. A subsequent judicial investigation found that 1,750 names on the town's voter rolls were fraudulent.

On January 18, 2025, a candidate for councilor in Northern Kabuntalan, Maguindanao del Norte, was shot dead in Midsayap, Cotabato. On February 4, Anwar Saluwang, the mayor of Nabalawag in the Special Geographic Area of Cotabato, was arrested in Davao City for violating the nationwide gun ban imposed as part of the election. On February 11, a vice mayoral candidate of Buluan, Maguindanao del Sur, survived an ambush on his vehicle. On February 24, Omar Samama, the reelectionist vice mayor of Datu Piang, Maguindanao del Sur, was shot and injured while speaking at an event. On March 26, the COMELEC officer for Datu Odin Sinsuat was killed in an ambush along with her husband, prompting COMELEC to place the municipality under its control on April 4.

On April 13, Datu Omar Baba, a reelectionist candidate for the provincial board of Maguindanao del Sur was injured along with his driver in an ambush in Datu Anggal Midtimbang. On April 15, the town of Buluan in Maguindanao del Sur was placed under COMELEC control due to continuing violence, including an incident where grenades were thrown at the municipal hall. On May 4, a grenade attack was carried out on the residence in Buluan of Maguindanao del Sur vice gubernatorial candidate Hisham Nando, who was campaigning elsewhere at the time. On May 10, a candidate for councilor and a student died in a clash in Pandag, Maguindanao del Sur. On May 11, four people were killed in clashes between supporters of rival mayoral candidates in Hadji Mohammad Ajul, Basilan, while four others were injured in a shootout between supporters of rival political parties in Cotabato City.

On polling day, clashes broke out in Marawi between supporters of rival candidates, while a poll watcher poured water on a vote-counting machine. Voting was delayed in Datu Odin Sinsuat after voters protested against the local election boards and barricaded the municipal hall. Two people, a councilor candidate and his sibling, an incumbent barangay chairman were killed in Bayang, Lanao del Sur. Three supporters of a mayoral candidate in Hadji Muhtamad, Basilan, were killed in a shootout with police.

On May 28, a newly elected councilor of Datu Piang, Maguindanao del Sur was shot dead near his residence.
