= Muslim Guiamaden =

Filipino politician

Sheikh Muslim Magkap Guiamaden
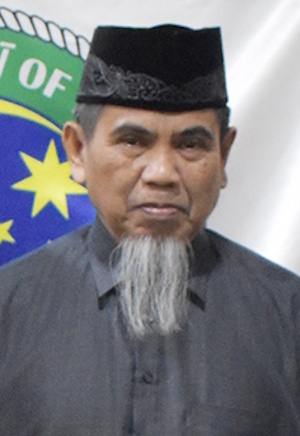
- Guiamaden in 2024

2nd Wa'lī of Bangsamoro
- Incumbent
- Assumed office May 13, 2024
- Nominated by: Council of Leaders
- Appointed by: Bangsamoro Transition Authority Parliament
- Chief Minister: Murad Ebrahim; Abdulraof Macacua
- Preceded by: Khalipha Nando; Omarkhalid Ampatuan (OIC)

Personal details
- Born: September 20, 1963 (age 63) Buluan, Cotabato, Philippines
- Education: Islamic University of Madinah

Military service
- Allegiance: Moro Islamic Liberation Front (MILF)

Sheikh Muslim Magkap Guiamaden (born September 20, 1963) is a Filipino politician. He is affiliated with the Moro Islamic Liberation Front and is currently serving as the second Wa'lī of Bangsamoro.

== Early life and education ==
Muslim Guiamaden was born in Buluan, Cotabato (now Maguindanao del Sur) on September 20, 1963.

Guiamaden attended the Islamic University of Madinah in Saudi Arabia where he obtained a degree in sharia, majoring in Islamic jurisprudence and principles.

== Career ==
=== Moro Islamic Liberation Front ===
The Moro Islamic Liberation Front (MILF) had Guiamaden serve at its Sharia Supreme Court at Camp Abubakar Assidiq, the rebel group's former base. Guiamaden had military training in Pakistan.

=== Activities in Qatar ===
Guiamaden was the MILF's official representative in Qatar. Outside the MILF, he was associated with the Qatari Ministry of Endowments and Islamic Affairs for 27 years and was also the founder of the Philippine Muslim Federation.

=== Wali of Bangsamoro ===
The Council of Leaders recommended Guiamaden and Muhammad Nadzer Ebil as candidates for the position of wa'lī of Bangsamoro autonomous region on May 9, 2024. However Ebil withdrew leading to the appointment of Guiamaden on May 13, 2024

Guiamaden succeeded Khalipha Nando who died on February 6, 2023, and assumed the duties of the position from Officer in Charge Omarkhalid Ampatuan.
