= 2022 Philippine local elections in Bangsamoro =

- May 9, 2022
- Gubernatorial elections
- 5 provincial governors and 1 city mayor
Party	Seats	+/–
PDP–Laban	2	0
Lakas	1	0
Nacionalista	1	0
TOP	1	New
UBJP	1	New
This lists parties that won seats. See the complete results below.
- Vice gubernatorial elections
- 5 provincial vice governors and 1 city vice mayor
Party	Seats	+/–
PDP–Laban	2	−1
Lakas	1	0
Nacionalista	1	New
TOP	1	New
UBJP	1	New
This lists parties that won seats. See the complete results below.
- Provincial Board elections
- 46 provincial board members and 10 city councilors
Party	Seats	+/–
PDP–Laban	19	−2
UBJP	10	New
Nacionalista	8	+6
TOP	7	New
Lakas	6	−5
NPC	3	−4
Aksyon	1	New
BUP	1	New
NUP	1	−7
This lists parties that won seats. See the complete results below.

The 2022 Philippine local elections in Bangsamoro were held on May 9, 2022.

== Summary ==
=== Governors ===
Province/city	Incumbent	Incumbent's party	Winner	Winner's party	Winning margin
Basilan	Hadjiman Hataman Salliman	PDP–Laban	Hadjiman Hataman Salliman	PDP–Laban	18.66%
Cotabato City (ICC)	Cynthia Guiani-Sayadi	NPC	Bruce Matabalao	UBJP	8.68%
Lanao del Sur	Mamintal Adiong Jr.	Lakas	Mamintal Adiong Jr.	Lakas	60.04%
Maguindanao	Mariam Mangudadatu	Nacionalista	Mariam Mangudadatu	Nacionalista	21.05%
Sulu	Abdusakur Mahail Tan	PDP–Laban	Abdusakur Mahail Tan	PDP–Laban	Unopposed
Tawi-Tawi	Yshmael Sali	TOP	Yshmael Sali	TOP	17.21%

=== Vice governors ===
Province/city	Incumbent	Incumbent's party	Winner	Winner's party	Winning margin
Basilan	Yusop Alano	PDP–Laban	Yusop Alano	PDP–Laban	59.26%
Cotabato City (ICC)	Graham Nazer Dumama	NPC	Butch Abu	UBJP	8.71%
Lanao del Sur	Mujam Adiong	Lakas	Mujam Adiong	Lakas	65.54%
Maguindanao	Lester Sinsuat	Nacionalista	Ainee Sinsuat	Nacionalista	12.61%
Sulu	Abdusakur Tan II	PDP–Laban	Abdusakur Tan II	PDP–Laban	Unopposed
Tawi-Tawi	Al-Syed Sali	TOP	Al-Syed Sali	TOP	24.88%

=== Provincial boards ===
Province/city	Seats	Party control		Composition
Province/city	Seats	Previous	Result	Composition
Basilan	8 elected 4 ex-officio	PDP–Laban	No majority	PDP–Laban (6); UBJP (1); BUP (1)
Cotabato City (ICC)	10 elected 4 ex-officio	No majority	No majority	UBJP (7); NPC (3)
Lanao del Sur	10 elected 3 ex-officio	PDP–Laban	No majority	Lakas (6); PDP–Laban (3); Aksyon (1)
Maguindanao	10 elected 4 ex-officio	No majority	Nacionalista	Nacionalista (8); UBJP (2)
Sulu	10 elected 3 ex-officio	No majority	PDP–Laban	PDP–Laban (10)
Tawi-Tawi	8 elected 6 ex-officio	No majority	No majority	TOP (7); NUP (1)

== Basilan ==
=== Governor ===
Incumbent Governor Hadjiman Hataman Salliman of PDP–Laban ran for a third term.

Hataman won re-election against former provincial board member Alfiya Akbar (Lakas–CMD) and two other candidates.

Candidate	Party	Votes	%
Hadjiman Hataman Salliman (incumbent)	PDP–Laban	121,457	59.03
Alfiya Akbar	Lakas–CMD	83,056	40.37
Walid Amiril	Pederalismo ng Dugong Dakilang Samahan	630	0.31
Ismael Garingan	Independent	617	0.30
Total		205,760	100.00
Total votes		223,811	–
Registered voters/turnout		297,322	75.28
PDP–Laban hold			
Source: Commission on Elections

=== Vice Governor ===
Incumbent Vice Governor Yusop Alano of PDP–Laban ran for a third term.

Alano won re-election against provincial board member Pai Sali (United Bangsamoro Justice Party) and two other candidates.

Candidate	Party	Votes	%
Yusop Alano (incumbent)	PDP–Laban	146,013	78.52
Pai Sali	United Bangsamoro Justice Party	35,820	19.26
Rahma Jamiri	Independent	2,069	1.11
Majid Abdil	Independent	2,045	1.10
Total		185,947	100.00
Total votes		223,811	–
Registered voters/turnout		297,322	75.28
PDP–Laban hold			
Source: Commission on Elections

=== Provincial Board ===
The Basilan Provincial Board is composed of 12 board members, eight of whom are elected.

The PDP–Laban remained as the largest party in the provincial board with six seats, but lost its majority.

Party	Votes	%	Seats	+/–
PDP–Laban	341,307	51.29	6	–1
United Bangsamoro Justice Party	164,723	24.75	1	New
Liberal Party	54,896	8.25	0	–1
Basilan Unity Party	50,071	7.52	1	New
Independent	54,487	8.19	0	0
Total	665,484	100.00	8	0
Total votes	223,811	–		
Registered voters/turnout	297,322	75.28		

==== 1st district ====
Basilan's 1st provincial district is composed of the city of Isabela and the municipalities of Hadji Muhtamad, Lantawan and Maluso. Four board members are elected from this provincial district.

11 candidates were included in the ballot.

Candidate	Party	Votes	%
Nasser Salain (incumbent)	PDP–Laban	53,035	17.70
Amin Hataman	Basilan Unity Party	50,071	16.71
Moumar Muarip (incumbent)	PDP–Laban	45,833	15.29
Allet Ismael (incumbent)	United Bangsamoro Justice Party	39,449	13.16
Aina Ismael (incumbent)	United Bangsamoro Justice Party	33,991	11.34
Rosebell Sanson	PDP–Laban	32,951	10.99
Jenny Tubongbanua	Independent	17,978	6.00
Omar Akbar	Independent	16,313	5.44
Danny Sahi	Liberal Party	7,328	2.45
Asimin Sarikin	Independent	1,936	0.65
Wheng Taberoa	Independent	818	0.27
Total		299,703	100.00
Total votes		98,623	–
Registered voters/turnout		140,828	70.03
Source: Commission on Elections

==== 2nd district ====
Basilan's 2nd provincial district is composed of the city of Lamitan and the municipalities of Akbar, Al-Barka, Hadji Mohammad Ajul, Sumisip, Tabuan-Lasa, Tipo-Tipo, Tuburan and Ungkaya Pukan. Four board members are elected from this provincial district.

12 candidates were included in the ballot.

Candidate	Party	Votes	%
Jay Salliman	PDP–Laban	57,289	15.66
Marwan Hataman	PDP–Laban	53,003	14.49
Monsoy Aramil (incumbent)	PDP–Laban	50,693	13.86
Nasser Asarul (incumbent)	PDP–Laban	48,503	13.26
Durie Kallahal	Liberal Party	47,568	13.00
Yeh Sali	United Bangsamoro Justice Party	40,594	11.10
Hadji Kasim Idris	United Bangsamoro Justice Party	28,300	7.74
Hamdie Majirul	United Bangsamoro Justice Party	22,389	6.12
Madz Abdulla	Independent	11,135	3.04
Ibnohair Akalun	Independent	2,805	0.77
Bert Reyes	Independent	2,138	0.58
Shing Jalil	Independent	1,364	0.37
Total		365,781	100.00
Total votes		125,188	–
Registered voters/turnout		156,494	80.00
Source: Commission on Elections

== Cotabato City ==
=== Mayor ===
Incumbent Mayor Cynthia Guiani-Sayadi of the Nationalist People's Coalition ran for a second term.

Guiani-Sayadi was defeated by city councilor Bruce Matabalao of the United Bangsamoro Justice Party.

On April 23, 2025, the Commission on Elections' Second Division nullified the election results in 36 clustered precincts in Cotabato City and declared Guiani-Sayadi as the winner of the 2022 election. However, Matabalao remained as mayor pending a final decision on the election result.

Candidate	Party	Votes	%
Bruce Matabalao	United Bangsamoro Justice Party	36,151	54.34
Cynthia Guiani-Sayadi (incumbent)	Nationalist People's Coalition	30,373	45.66
Total		66,524	100.00
Total votes		68,706	–
Registered voters/turnout		120,221	57.15
UBJP gain from NPC			
Source: Commission on Elections

=== Vice Mayor ===
Incumbent Vice Mayor Graham Nazer Dumama of the Nationalist People's Coalition ran for a second term.

Dumama was defeated by city councilor Butch Abu of the United Bangsamoro Justice Party. Nasrudin Mohammad (Independent) also ran for vice mayor.

Candidate	Party	Votes	%
Butch Abu	United Bangsamoro Justice Party	33,050	50.97
Graham Nazer Dumama (incumbent)	Nationalist People's Coalition	27,401	42.26
Nasrudin Mohammad	Independent	4,392	6.77
Total		64,843	100.00
Total votes		68,706	–
Registered voters/turnout		120,221	57.15
UBJP gain from NPC			
Source: Commission on Elections

=== City Council ===
The Cotabato City Council is composed of 14 councilors, 10 of whom are elected.

28 candidates were included in the ballot.

The United Bangsamoro Justice Party won seven seats, becoming the largest party in the city council.

Party	Votes	%	Seats	+/–
United Bangsamoro Justice Party	266,633	49.31	7	New
Nationalist People's Coalition	232,822	43.06	3	–4
People's Reform Party	15,599	2.88	0	New
Aksyon Demokratiko	12,958	2.40	0	New
PROMDI	2,878	0.53	0	New
Partido Demokratiko Sosyalista ng Pilipinas	1,199	0.22	0	New
Partido Federal ng Pilipinas	893	0.17	0	–1
Independent	7,751	1.43	0	0
Total	540,733	100.00	10	0
Total votes	68,706	–		
Registered voters/turnout	120,221	57.15		

Candidate	Party	Votes	%
Popoy Formento (incumbent)	United Bangsamoro Justice Party	33,548	6.20
Hunyn Abu	United Bangsamoro Justice Party	29,120	5.39
Marouf Pasawiran	United Bangsamoro Justice Party	28,205	5.22
Jayjay Guiani (incumbent)	Nationalist People's Coalition	28,099	5.20
Abdulrakim Usman	United Bangsamoro Justice Party	27,693	5.12
Guiadzuri Midtimbang II	United Bangsamoro Justice Party	26,608	4.92
Kusin Taha	United Bangsamoro Justice Party	26,193	4.84
Henjie Ali	United Bangsamoro Justice Party	25,570	4.73
Danda Juanday	Nationalist People's Coalition	25,546	4.72
Abdillah Lim (incumbent)	Nationalist People's Coalition	24,417	4.52
Suk Sema	Nationalist People's Coalition	24,215	4.48
Naut Usman	United Bangsamoro Justice Party	24,106	4.46
Bai Myria Candao	United Bangsamoro Justice Party	24,015	4.44
Reynaldo Ridao	Nationalist People's Coalition	23,925	4.42
Michael Datumanong (incumbent)	Nationalist People's Coalition	23,886	4.42
Eduardo Rabago (incumbent)	Nationalist People's Coalition	22,476	4.16
Kagui Hammed Maguing	United Bangsamoro Justice Party	21,575	3.99
Hassan Biruar (incumbent)	Nationalist People's Coalition	20,862	3.86
Al Haashir Ala	Nationalist People's Coalition	19,918	3.68
Romeo Lidasan	Nationalist People's Coalition	19,478	3.60
D.A. Lidasan	People's Reform Party	15,599	2.88
Omar Patadon	Aksyon Demokratiko	12,958	2.40
Ramon Coronel	Independent	4,093	0.76
Chavy Sinsuat	PROMDI	2,878	0.53
Dong Ampatuan	Independent	1,933	0.36
Billy Lucas	Independent	1,725	0.32
Pam Kansi	Partido Demokratiko Sosyalista ng Pilipinas	1,199	0.22
Jay Sabangan	Partido Federal ng Pilipinas	893	0.17
Total		540,733	100.00
Total votes		68,706	–
Registered voters/turnout		120,221	57.15
Source: Commission on Elections

== Lanao del Sur ==
=== Governor ===
Incumbent Governor Mamintal Adiong Jr. of Lakas–CMD ran for a second term.

Adiong won re-election against nine other candidates.

Candidate	Party	Votes	%
Mamintal Adiong Jr. (incumbent)	Lakas–CMD	353,769	74.22
Gapor Randy Usman	Reform Party	67,605	14.18
Abu Mohammad Sarangani	Ummah Party	42,958	9.01
Mansawi Mimbalawag	Independent	5,705	1.20
Alim Ibrahim	Independent	2,200	0.46
Camar Banocag Jr.	Independent	1,386	0.29
Jahlalodin Lucman	Workers' and Peasants' Party	1,353	0.28
Ansary Maongco	Partido para sa Demokratikong Reporma	659	0.14
Haber Dida-aguin	Independent	639	0.13
Khalfan Molia	Pederalismo ng Dugong Dakilang Samahan	407	0.09
Total		476,681	100.00
Total votes		545,443	–
Registered voters/turnout		685,643	79.55
Lakas hold			
Source: Commission on Elections

=== Vice Governor ===
Incumbent Vice Governor Mujam Adiong of Lakas–CMD ran for a second term.

Adiong won re-election against six other candidates.

Candidate	Party	Votes	%
Mujam Adiong (incumbent)	Lakas–CMD	356,886	78.06
Bashier Manalao	Reform Party	57,229	12.52
Alim-saad Amate	PDP–Laban	30,752	6.73
Nadjer Abdul	People's Reform Party	6,002	1.31
Abulkhair Alawi	Independent	3,688	0.81
Hogecar Ala	Partido para sa Demokratikong Reporma	1,378	0.30
Cacayadun Manta	Independent	1,232	0.27
Total		457,167	100.00
Total votes		545,443	–
Registered voters/turnout		685,643	79.55
Lakas hold			
Source: Commission on Elections

=== Provincial Board ===
The Lanao del Sur Provincial Board is composed of 13 board members, 10 of whom are elected.

Lakas–CMD remained as the largest party in the provincial board with six seats, but lost its majority.

Party	Votes	%	Seats	+/–
Lakas–CMD	737,609	37.30	6	–2
PDP–Laban	277,692	14.04	3	+3
Ummah Party	200,547	10.14	0	New
Aksyon Demokratiko	162,528	8.22	1	New
Reform Party	139,657	7.06	0	New
Partido para sa Demokratikong Reporma	111,261	5.63	0	New
Nacionalista Party	30,479	1.54	0	–1
Workers' and Peasants' Party	30,043	1.52	0	New
People's Reform Party	22,158	1.12	0	New
PROMDI	9,708	0.49	0	New
Liberal Party	7,363	0.37	0	0
Partido Federal ng Pilipinas	5,455	0.28	0	0
Partido Pederal ng Maharlika	4,915	0.25	0	New
Independent	237,847	12.03	0	–1
Total	1,977,262	100.00	10	0
Total votes	545,443	–		
Registered voters/turnout	685,643	79.55		

==== 1st district ====
Lanao del Sur's 1st provincial district consists of the same area as Lanao del Sur's 1st legislative district. Five board members are elected from this provincial district.

34 candidates were included in the ballot.

Candidate	Party	Votes	%
Alzaif Munder (incumbent)	Lakas–CMD	144,964	13.12
Shirali Sani (incumbent)	Lakas–CMD	130,214	11.79
Ringo Gandamra	PDP–Laban	128,884	11.67
Nash Ganda (incumbent)	Lakas–CMD	113,840	10.30
Zorab Mangotara (incumbent)	Lakas–CMD	109,200	9.88
Noronisa Dipatuan	Ummah Party	79,264	7.17
Abdulnasser Dimapinto	Reform Party	61,936	5.61
Abuarham Abdulkareem	Aksyon Demokratiko	57,221	5.18
Malo Hadji Jafaar Balenti	Ummah Party	36,118	3.27
Ustadz Nader Guro	Reform Party	32,208	2.92
Alim Asgar	Ummah Party	24,987	2.26
Alimondas Laut	Workers' and Peasants' Party	23,782	2.15
Alex Macalawi	Ummah Party	19,195	1.74
Abdul Basit Macarampat	People's Reform Party	13,521	1.22
Padel Hassan	Independent	13,447	1.22
Masalakbo Abunamla	Aksyon Demokratiko	13,221	1.20
Rakim Sangcaan	Independent	11,394	1.03
Abdullah Ambulo	Reform Party	11,108	1.01
Alicozaman Mangata (incumbent)	Lakas–CMD	8,893	0.80
Almani Abubacar	Partido para sa Demokratikong Reporma	8,889	0.80
Awidaranao Maloway	PROMDI	6,815	0.62
Salic Sultan	Ummah Party	6,723	0.61
Zainoden Disocor	Workers' and Peasants' Party	6,261	0.57
H. Abdulhamid Macapundag	Independent	5,341	0.48
Nafisah Abolais	Independent	5,015	0.45
Jamael Yahya	Partido para sa Demokratikong Reporma	4,384	0.40
Abdulgafur Pundogar	People's Reform Party	4,193	0.38
Basher Pagul	Independent	3,849	0.35
Hadji Mohaimen	Partido para sa Demokratikong Reporma	3,818	0.35
Calauto-ipo Hadji Jalal	Partido Pederal ng Maharlika	3,590	0.32
Abuhumaidy Sultan	Independent	3,561	0.32
Naguib Macabato	Independent	3,520	0.32
Zadat Olama	People's Reform Party	2,784	0.25
Camaroden Cabila	Independent	2,600	0.24
Total		1,104,740	100.00
Total votes		312,809	–
Registered voters/turnout		390,056	80.20
Source: Commission on Elections

==== 2nd district ====
Lanao del Sur's 2nd provincial district consists of the same area as Lanao del Sur's 2nd legislative district. Five board members are elected from this provincial district.

36 candidates were included in the ballot.

Candidate	Party	Votes	%
Bubuly Decampong	Aksyon Demokratiko	90,282	10.35
Abdulhamid Amerbitor (incumbent)	Lakas–CMD	72,896	8.35
Taha-Tanjie Macapodi	PDP–Laban	65,852	7.55
Fahad Arimao	PDP–Laban	63,090	7.23
Caoden Marohombsar (incumbent)	Lakas–CMD	58,784	6.74
Allan Panolong (incumbent)	Lakas–CMD	57,563	6.60
Mohammad Hussein Pamaloy	Independent	48,543	5.56
Edres Manalocon	Partido para sa Demokratikong Reporma	48,082	5.51
Alioden Didatoon	Partido para sa Demokratikong Reporma	46,088	5.28
Sahron Tamano	Independent	44,457	5.10
Amir-Oden Balindong (incumbent)	Lakas–CMD	41,255	4.73
Omar Datu-Dacula	Independent	32,081	3.68
Sharieffali Tanog	Nacionalista Party	30,479	3.49
Romie Balt	PDP–Laban	19,866	2.28
Mamarinta Pagayawan	Ummah Party	17,411	2.00
Morsalim Binnortominoray	Independent	17,069	1.96
Dino Yahya	Ummah Party	16,849	1.93
Mohaimen Mokay Marohom	Independent	16,652	1.91
Mohammad Ampaso	Independent	14,155	1.62
James Sarip	Reform Party	14,134	1.62
Alim Salic Ali	Reform Party	12,032	1.38
Mobahar Bantuas Jr.	Liberal Party	7,363	0.84
Ulomoden Magarang	Reform Party	5,726	0.66
Mohammad Amerol	Partido Federal ng Pilipinas	5,455	0.63
Noroding Ibrahim	Independent	4,739	0.54
Fahad Cadal	Independent	4,627	0.53
Jalanie Dipatuan	PROMDI	2,893	0.33
Usman Rawanding	Independent	2,626	0.30
Cairoden Caderan	Reform Party	2,513	0.29
Lominog Pagnao-Sarip	Aksyon Demokratiko	1,804	0.21
Suharto Buleg	Independent	1,613	0.18
Naimah Sarip	People's Reform Party	1,660	0.19
Allan Esmael	Partido Pederal ng Maharlika	1,325	0.15
Amina Arobento	Independent	1,174	0.13
Mohamad Sanguan	Independent	717	0.08
Diamon Undaya	Independent	667	0.08
Total		872,522	100.00
Total votes		232,634	–
Registered voters/turnout		295,587	78.70
Source: Commission on Elections

== Maguindanao ==
=== Governor ===
Incumbent Governor Mariam Mangudadatu of the Nacionalista Party ran for a second term.

Mangudadatu won re-election against representative Esmael Mangudadatu (United Bangsamoro Justice Party) and four other candidates.

Candidate	Party	Votes	%
Mariam Mangudadatu (incumbent)	Nacionalista Party	332,141	60.01
Esmael Mangudadatu	United Bangsamoro Justice Party	215,613	38.96
Hadji Yasser Ampatuan	PROMDI	1,793	0.32
Norsalyn Kasim	Independent	1,778	0.32
Datu Mala Lumbos	Independent	1,763	0.32
Dhats Ganasi	Aksyon Demokratiko	381	0.07
Total		553,469	100.00
Total votes		601,501	–
Registered voters/turnout		818,790	73.46
Nacionalista hold			
Source: Commission on Elections

=== Vice Governor ===
Term-limited incumbent Vice Governor Lester Sinsuat of the Nacionalista Party ran for mayor of Datu Odin Sinsuat. He was previously affiliated with PDP–Laban.

The Nacionalista Party nominated Sinsuat's wife, Ainee Sinsuat, who won the election against former representative Bai Sandra Sema (United Bangsamoro Justice Party) and three other candidates.

Candidate	Party	Votes	%
Ainee Sinsuat	Nacionalista Party	303,013	55.85
Bai Sandra Sema	United Bangsamoro Justice Party	234,591	43.24
Utto Alpata	PROMDI	2,679	0.49
Suraida Abdullah	Independent	1,506	0.28
Abdulhadi Hasim	Independent	724	0.13
Total		542,513	100.00
Total votes		601,501	–
Registered voters/turnout		818,790	73.46
Nacionalista hold			
Source: Commission on Elections

=== Provincial Board ===
The Maguindanao Provincial Board is composed of 14 board members, 10 of whom are elected.

The Nacionalista Party won eight seats, gaining a majority in the provincial board.

Party	Votes	%	Seats	+/–
Nacionalista Party	1,098,278	55.30	8	+7
United Bangsamoro Justice Party	752,101	37.87	2	New
Partido Federal ng Pilipinas	27,782	1.40	0	New
PROMDI	10,431	0.53	0	New
Aksyon Demokratiko	4,847	0.24	0	New
Independent	92,775	4.67	0	0
Total	1,986,214	100.00	10	0
Total votes	601,501	–		
Registered voters/turnout	818,790	73.46		

==== 1st district ====
Maguindanao's 1st provincial district consists of the same area as Maguindanao's 1st legislative district, excluding Cotabato City. Five board members are elected from this provincial district.

19 candidates were included in the ballot.

Candidate	Party	Votes	%
Datu Sharifudin Mastura (incumbent)	Nacionalista Party	120,609	13.27
Mashur Biruar (incumbent)	Nacionalista Party	100,570	11.06
Alexa Ashley Tomawis	United Bangsamoro Justice Party	94,803	10.43
Thong Abas	United Bangsamoro Justice Party	89,439	9.84
Rommel Sinsuat	Nacionalista Party	89,364	9.83
Bai Lannie Diocolano	Nacionalista Party	87,927	9.67
Datu Bimbo Sinsuat Jr. (incumbent)	United Bangsamoro Justice Party	80,120	8.81
Maria Cecilia Sinsuat	Nacionalista Party	71,650	7.88
Datu Bobsteel Sinsuat	United Bangsamoro Justice Party	71,297	7.84
Montasir Esmael	United Bangsamoro Justice Party	66,387	7.30
Omar Dimaampao	Independent	8,929	0.98
Samsodin Ibay	PROMDI	5,798	0.64
Nasrudin Mohammad	Independent	4,904	0.54
Harris Piang	Aksyon Demokratiko	4,847	0.53
Sammy Ampuan	Independent	3,080	0.34
Datu Balabaran Edres	PROMDI	2,989	0.33
Mohamad Guiapal	Independent	2,929	0.32
Hassim Kiram	Independent	1,800	0.20
Al-Mala Tarusan	PROMDI	1,644	0.18
Total		909,086	100.00
Total votes		254,072	–
Registered voters/turnout		364,128	69.78
Source: Commission on Elections

==== 2nd district ====
Maguindanao's 2nd provincial district consists of the same area as Maguindanao's 2nd legislative district, excluding Cotabato City. Five board members are elected from this provincial district.

35 candidates were included in the ballot.

Candidate	Party	Votes	%
Nathaniel Midtimbang	Nacionalista	149,821	13.91
Bobby Midtimbang (incumbent)	Nacionalista	133,339	12.38
Kaka Jeng Macapendeg	Nacionalista	123,305	11.45
Yussef Abubakar Paglas	Nacionalista Party	114,555	10.64
Alonto Bangkulit Jr.	Nacionalista Party	107,138	9.95
King Mangudadatu (incumbent)	United Bangsamoro Justice Party	92,532	8.59
DJ Parok Mangudadatu (incumbent)	United Bangsamoro Justice Party	83,220	7.73
Glen Youseff Piang (incumbent)	United Bangsamoro Justice Party	66,353	6.16
Abdulkarim Madidis	United Bangsamoro Justice Party	54,076	5.02
Abdullatip Sabpel	United Bangsamoro Justice Party	53,874	5.00
Datu Bolelo Mamasabulod	Partido Federal ng Pilipinas	16,708	1.55
Poy Lumenda	Independent	11,322	1.05
Datu Baba Omar	Partido Federal ng Pilipinas	11,074	1.03
Ebrahim Abdullah	Independent	6,128	0.57
Zacaria Utto	Independent	5,340	0.50
Datu Merrie Baganian	Independent	4,135	0.38
Teng Samama	Independent	3,684	0.34
Montaser Kasan	Independent	3,503	0.33
Dadtungan Mamasapano	Independent	3,319	0.31
Datu Luminog Delangalen	Independent	3,297	0.31
Datumusthapa Datukaka	Independent	3,086	0.29
Norudin Salik	Independent	2,984	0.28
Mongs Matanog	Independent	2,852	0.26
Nasser Santua	Independent	2,776	0.26
Alvin Katambak	Independent	2,487	0.23
Almansour Marohombsar	Independent	2,426	0.23
Ahmad Andek	Independent	2,233	0.21
Mohiddin Pananggulon	Independent	2,029	0.19
Hasna Ibrahim	Independent	1,802	0.17
Nico Salasal	Independent	1,514	0.14
Kamarozaman Rajahmuda	Independent	1,506	0.14
Nadsma Datusakaludan	Independent	1,444	0.13
Koling Wahab	Independent	1,220	0.11
Joran Satol	Independent	1,094	0.10
Nor Hanafi	Independent	952	0.09
Total		1,077,128	100.00
Total votes		347,429	–
Registered voters/turnout		454,662	76.41
Source: Commission on Elections

== Sulu ==
=== Governor ===
Incumbent Governor Abdusakur Mahail Tan of PDP–Laban won re-election for a second term unopposed.

Candidate	Party	Votes	%
Abdusakur Mahail Tan (incumbent)	PDP–Laban	346,273	100.00
Total		346,273	100.00
Total votes		375,265	–
Registered voters/turnout		433,372	86.59
PDP–Laban hold			
Source: Commission on Elections

=== Vice Governor ===
Incumbent Vice Governor Abdusakur Tan II of PDP–Laban won re-election for a second term unopposed.

Candidate	Party	Votes	%
Abdusakur Tan II (incumbent)	PDP–Laban	343,050	100.00
Total		343,050	100.00
Total votes		375,265	–
Registered voters/turnout		433,372	86.59
PDP–Laban hold			
Source: Commission on Elections

=== Provincial Board ===
The Sulu Provincial Board is composed of 13 board members, 10 of whom are elected.

PDP–Laban won 10 seats, gaining a majority in the provincial board.

Party	Votes	%	Seats	+/–
PDP–Laban	1,206,719	92.92	10	+3
Pederalismo ng Dugong Dakilang Samahan	26,478	2.04	0	New
United Bangsamoro Justice Party	11,210	0.86	0	New
Independent	54,285	4.18	0	0
Total	1,298,692	100.00	10	0
Total votes	375,265	–		
Registered voters/turnout	433,372	86.59		

==== 1st district ====
Sulu's 1st provincial district consists of the same area as Sulu's 1st legislative district. Five board members are elected from this provincial district.

12 candidates were included in the ballot.

Candidate	Party	Votes	%
Al-Minzhen Suhuri (incumbent)	PDP–Laban	142,204	22.02
Crisanta Hayudini (incumbent)	PDP–Laban	136,577	21.15
Lovely Isahac (incumbent)	PDP–Laban	114,115	17.67
Sulaiman Burahan (incumbent)	PDP–Laban	108,509	16.80
Nurshida Karanain (incumbent)	PDP–Laban	102,571	15.88
Sasahan Abdul	Pederalismo ng Dugong Dakilang Samahan	12,900	2.00
Fatty Hairon	Pederalismo ng Dugong Dakilang Samahan	7,153	1.11
Khan Ahajan	Independent	6,000	0.93
Walid Alimuddin	Independent	4,864	0.75
Ismurajan Sajiran	Independent	4,827	0.75
Adam Annuh	Independent	3,383	0.52
Rugaiya Sali	Independent	2,625	0.41
Total		645,728	100.00
Total votes		206,681	–
Registered voters/turnout		246,813	83.74
Source: Commission on Elections

==== 2nd district ====
Sulu's 2nd provincial district consists of the same area as Sulu's 2nd legislative district. Five board members are elected from this provincial district.

Nine candidates were included in the ballot.

Candidate	Party	Votes	%
Nadia Arbison (incumbent)	PDP–Laban	130,038	19.92
Raihana Arbison-Adam (incumbent)	PDP–Laban	125,642	19.24
Nurwina Sahidulla (incumbent)	PDP–Laban	124,312	19.04
Radz Burahan	PDP–Laban	119,596	18.32
Akmadhan Sitin (incumbent)	PDP–Laban	103,155	15.80
Nasser Tillah	Independent	20,457	3.13
Arjin Aradais	Independent	12,129	1.86
Kadapi Gaca	United Bangsamoro Justice Party	11,210	1.72
Basil Salim	Pederalismo ng Dugong Dakilang Samahan	6,425	0.98
Total		652,964	100.00
Total votes		168,584	–
Registered voters/turnout		186,559	90.36
Source: Commission on Elections

== Tawi-Tawi ==
=== Governor ===
Incumbent Governor Yshmael Sali of Tawi-Tawi One Party ran for a second term. He was previously affiliated with the National Unity Party.

Sali won re-election against former Tawi-Tawi governor Sadikul Sahali (PDP–Laban) and three other candidates.

Candidate	Party	Votes	%
Yshmael Sali (incumbent)	Tawi-Tawi One Party	106,225	58.31
Sadikul Sahali	PDP–Laban	74,878	41.10
Kennedy Tan	Independent	580	0.32
Darwin Abdul	Independent	327	0.18
Dada Ibnohajil	PDP–Laban	168	0.09
Total		182,178	100.00
Total votes		192,146	–
Registered voters/turnout		232,845	82.52
TOP hold			
Source: Commission on Elections

=== Vice Governor ===
Incumbent Vice Governor Michail Ahaja of the Tawi-Tawi One Party (TOP) was term-limited. He was previously affiliated with the National Unity Party.

The TOP nominated Bangsamoro member of parliament Al-Syed Sali, who won the election against former representative Anuar Abubakar (PDP–Laban) and Arnold Akip (Independent).

Candidate	Party	Votes	%
Al-Syed Sali	Tawi-Tawi One Party	105,594	61.81
Anuar Abubakar	PDP–Laban	63,085	36.93
Arnold Akip	Independent	2,165	1.27
Total		170,844	100.00
Total votes		192,146	–
Registered voters/turnout		232,845	82.52
TOP hold			
Source: Commission on Elections

=== Provincial Board ===
The Tawi-Tawi Provincial Board is composed of 14 board members, eight of whom are elected.

The Tawi-Tawi One Party won seven seats, becoming the largest party in the provincial board.

Party	Votes	%	Seats	+/–
Tawi-Tawi One Party	316,139	58.56	7	New
PDP–Laban	90,354	16.74	0	–1
National Unity Party	38,699	7.17	1	–6
Independent	94,636	17.53	0	0
Total	539,828	100.00	8	0
Total votes	192,146	–		
Registered voters/turnout	232,845	82.52		

==== 1st district ====
Tawi-Tawi's 1st provincial district consists of the municipalities of Bongao, Mapun, Sibutu, Simunul, Sitangkai and Turtle Islands. Six board members are elected from this provincial district.

12 candidates were included in the ballot.

Candidate	Party	Votes	%
Renil Samsuya (incumbent)	Tawi-Tawi One Party	56,511	20.10
Madi Tidal (incumbent)	Tawi-Tawi One Party	55,169	19.62
Allan Ahamad (incumbent)	Tawi-Tawi One Party	48,494	17.25
Sabuddin Abdurahim (incumbent)	Tawi-Tawi One Party	46,553	16.56
Julficar Ladjahali	Independent	17,726	6.30
Edgar Puhagan	PDP–Laban	14,014	4.98
Sabirin Pamikilan	Independent	12,731	4.53
Nuhaila Amirulhadj	PDP–Laban	10,409	3.70
Laurel Sampang	Independent	6,483	2.31
Ayub Bahauddin	Independent	5,655	2.01
Mohammadhussin Sallim	Independent	4,859	1.73
Asmadul Tahir	Independent	2,580	0.92
Total		281,184	100.00
Total votes		112,513	–
Registered voters/turnout		147,097	76.49
Source: Commission on Elections

==== 2nd district ====
Tawi-Tawi's 2nd provincial district consists of the municipalities of Languyan, Panglima Sugala, Sapa-Sapa, South Ubian and Tandubas. Four board members are elected from this provincial district.

13 candidates were included in the ballot.

Candidate	Party	Votes	%
Sukarno Asri (incumbent)	Tawi-Tawi One Party	40,372	15.61
Melhan Masdal	National Unity Party	38,699	14.96
Abduljamil Ishmael (incumbent)	Tawi-Tawi One Party	34,713	13.42
Mahmud Bawasanta (incumbent)	Tawi-Tawi One Party	34,327	13.27
Nasser Habe	PDP–Laban	27,274	10.54
Shameera Matolo	Independent	24,525	9.48
Algarad Lipae	PDP–Laban	20,936	8.09
Shadir Shalim	PDP–Laban	17,721	6.85
Dhes Mangona	Independent	13,924	5.38
Dels Matolo	Independent	3,845	1.49
Moreno Camlian	Independent	1,519	0.59
Alrafie Nawali	Independent	532	0.21
Insuan Tangkian	Independent	257	0.10
Total		258,644	100.00
Total votes		79,633	–
Registered voters/turnout		85,748	92.87
Source: Commission on Elections
