= Leadership Council =

Leadership Council may refer to:

== Politics and government ==
- Leadership Council of Afghanistan, the Taliban's top government body
- Presidential Leadership Council, the executive body of Yemen's internationally recognized transitional government
- Council of Leaders of Bangsamoro, advisory body to the Chief Minister of Bangsamoro, an autonomous region in the Philippines
- Leaders' Council (United Kingdom), a forum for representatives of local government in the United Kingdom
- Interim Leadership Council, the de facto collective head of state in Iran until a new supreme leader is elected

== Nonprofits ==
- Leadership Council of Conservative Judaism, an American body composed of leaders of multiple conservative Jewish organizations
