= Government of the Philippines =

Government of Republic of the Philippines
- Pamahalaan ng Pilipinas
- Coat of arms of the Philippines
- Formation: 1898; 128 years ago
- Founding document: Constitution of the Philippines
- Jurisdiction: Republic of the Philippines
- Website: www.gov.ph

Legislative branch
- Legislature: Congress
- Meeting place: GSIS Building (Senate); Batasang Pambansa Complex (House of Representatives)

Executive branch
- Leader: President
- Appointer: Direct popular vote
- Headquarters: Malacañang Palace, San Miguel, Manila
- Main organ: Cabinet
- Departments: Executive departments of the Philippines

Judicial branch
- Court: Supreme Court
- Seat: Supreme Court Building, Padre Faura Street, Ermita, Manila

The government of the Philippines (Filipino: Pamahalaan ng Pilipinas or Gobyerno ng Pilipinas) has three interdependent branches: the legislative, executive, and judicial branches. The Philippines is governed as a unitary state under a presidential, representative and democratic, constitutional republic in which the president serves as both the head of state and the head of government within a pluriform multi-party system.

The powers of the three branches are vested by the Constitution of the Philippines as follows: Legislative power is vested in the bicameral Congress of the Philippines—the Senate is the upper chamber, and the House of Representatives is the lower chamber. Executive power is exercised by the government under the leadership of the president. Judicial power is vested in the courts, with the Supreme Court of the Philippines as the highest judicial body.

== Executive branch ==
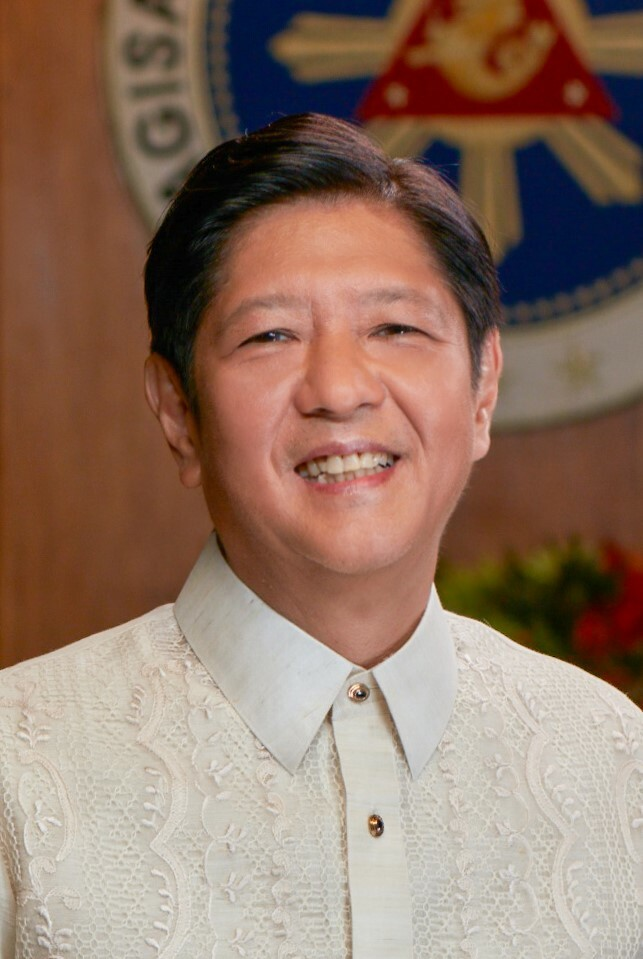
Bongbong Marcos
17th President

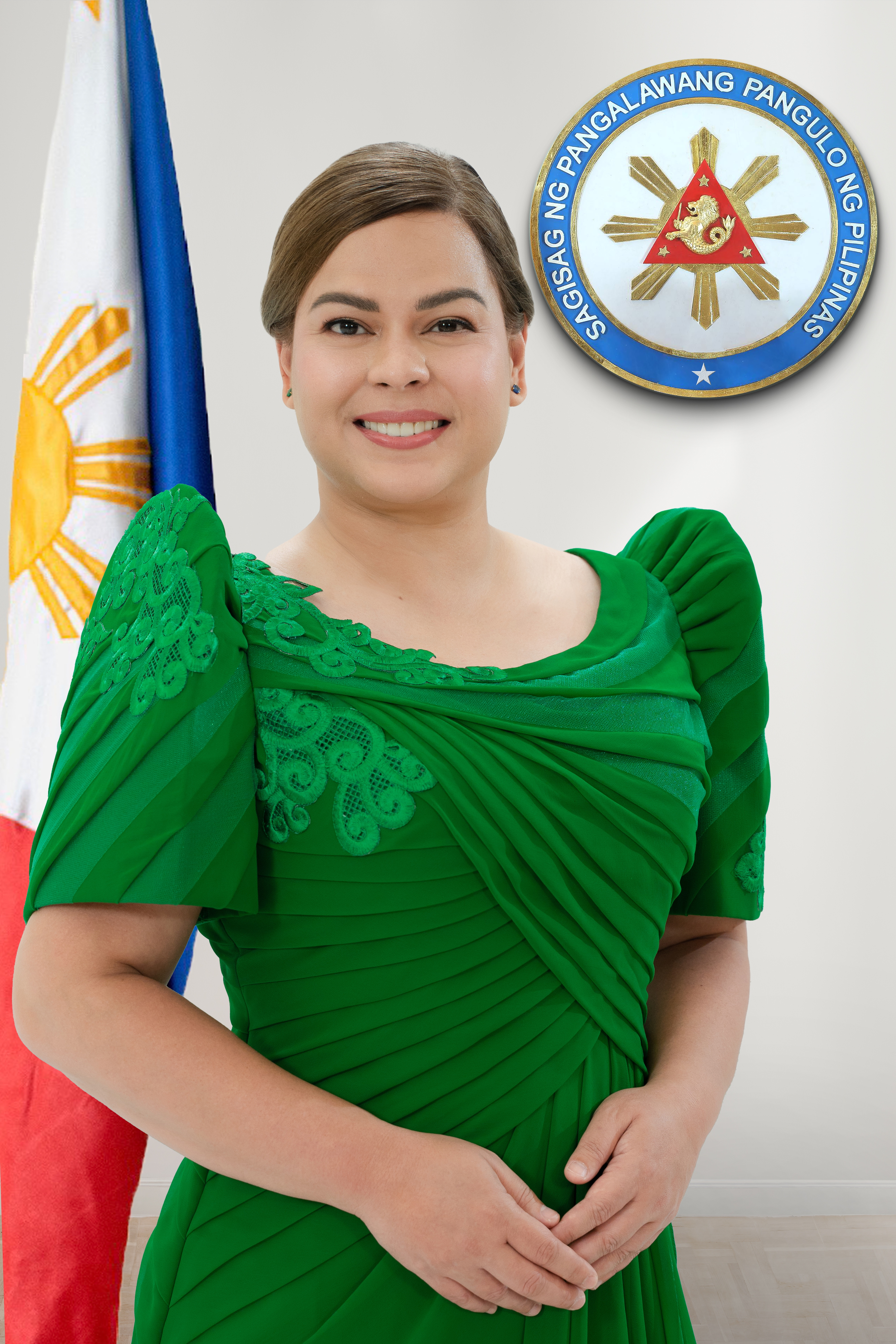
Sara Duterte
15th Vice President

since June 30, 2022

The executive branch of government comprises the Cabinet and all executive departments, led by the president. The president and vice president are directly elected separately by national popular vote for a term of six years. While the vice president may be re-elected an unlimited number of times (but only limited to two consecutive terms), the president is barred from seeking re-election. The incumbent president and vice president are Bongbong Marcos and Sara Duterte, respectively, who were elected in 2022.

=== President ===
The President of the Philippines is the country's chief executive, serving as the head of state and head of government. The president heads all executive departments. The heads of the departments, which make up the cabinet, are appointed by the president subject to the approval of the Commission on Appointments. The president also supervises all local government units. The president may also give executive issuances, grant pardons, and exercise the power of eminent domain. Aside from having the power to veto any bill, the president also sets the legislative agenda for Congress.

=== Vice President ===
The Vice President of the Philippines, the deputy chief executive, is the first in line for succession if the president resigns, is removed after impeachment, is permanently incapacitated, or dies. The vice president is usually, though not always, a member of the president's cabinet and may be appointed without the approval of the Commission on Appointments.

If there is a vacancy in the position of vice president, the president will appoint any member of Congress (usually a party member) as the new vice president. The appointment must then be validated by a three-fourths vote of the Congress.

In 2025, the Philippine Congress enacted the Government Optimization Act (Republic Act No. 12231), granting the President authority to reorganize executive branch agencies. The law allows the merging, abolishing, or transfer of functions among offices in order to streamline operations, improve efficiency, and reduce redundancy within the national government.

== Legislative branch ==
The legislative power is vested in the Congress of the Philippines. The Congress is bicameral, consisting of the Senate of the Philippines and the House of Representatives. The two chambers have roughly equal powers, and every bill or resolution that has to go through both houses needs the consent of both chambers before being passed for the President's signature. The Senate is located in Pasay, while the House of Representatives is located in Quezon City, both of which are in Metro Manila.

=== Senate ===
The Senate of the Philippines is the upper house of Congress. Senators are elected for a term of six years; they can be re-elected but may not run for a third consecutive term. Once a bill is approved by the House of Representatives, it is passed onto the Senate. A bill must first be approved by the Senate in order to be passed for the president's signature to become a law. Only the Senate can concur with treaties and try impeachment cases.

The Senate is led by the President of the Senate. The current Senate President is Sherwin Gatchalian.

=== House of Representatives ===
The House of Representatives of the Philippines is the lower house of the Congress. The House consists of district and sectoral representatives elected for a term of three years and may be re-elected for three consecutive terms. Each bill has to be approved by the House, after which it is sent to the Senate. Furthermore, all franchise and money bills must originate from the House. The House of Representatives also has the power to impeach certain officials.

The House of Representatives is headed by the Speaker of the House of Representatives. The current speaker is Bojie Dy.

== Judicial branch ==
Judicial power is vested in the Supreme Court of the Philippines and lower courts established by law. The Supreme Court, which has a chief justice as its head and 14 associate justices, occupies the highest tier of the judiciary. The justices serve until the age of 70. The justices are appointed by the president on the recommendation of the Judicial and Bar Council of the Philippines. The sitting chief justice is Alexander Gesmundo, the 27th to serve in that position.

Other types of courts, of varying jurisdiction around the archipelago, are the following:

- Lower Collegiate Courts:
  - Court of Appeals
  - Court of Tax Appeals
  - Sandiganbayan (a special appellate court)
- Regular Courts:
  - Regional Trial Courts
  - First-level courts:
    - Metropolitan Trial Courts
    - Municipal Trial Courts
    - Municipal Trial Courts in Cities
    - Municipal Circuit Trial Courts
- Sharia Courts:
  - Sharia District Courts
  - Sharia Circuit Courts

== Constitutional commissions ==
Article 9 of the Constitution of the Philippines establishes three independent constitutional commissions: the Civil Service Commission, the Commission on Elections, and the Commission on Audit.

The Civil Service Commission is the central personnel agency of the Philippine government. It is responsible for strengthening employment and a conducive work environment in the civil service sector and overseeing the Civil Service Exam, a civil service entrance examination to assess qualifications and work integrity for employment in the sector.

The Commission on Elections enforces and administers all laws and regulations related to conducting elections, plebiscites, initiatives, referendums, and recalls. It decides on all decisions surrounding election protests and contests and has the right to deputize and take control of law enforcement and state security forces to ensure the free and orderly conduct of elections.

The Commission on Audit is responsible for examining, auditing, and settling all revenues and expenditures of public funds and properties used by the government or its attached agencies.

== Office of the Ombudsman ==
The three branches of the Philippine government are independently monitored by the Office of the Ombudsman (Filipino: Tanodbayan). The ombudsman is given the mandate to investigate and prosecute any government official allegedly guilty of crimes, especially graft and corruption. The ombudsman is assisted by six deputies: the overall deputy, the deputy for Luzon, the deputy for Visayas, the deputy for Mindanao, the deputy for the armed forces, and the special prosecutor.

== Local government ==
Local government hierarchy

President of the Philippines
Autonomous regions
Provinces	Independent cities	Provinces	Independent cities
Component cities	Municipalities	Component cities	Municipalities
Barangays	Barangays	Barangays	Barangays	Barangays	Barangays

The dashed lines emanating from the president means that the President only exercises general supervision on local government.

The Philippines has four main classes of elected administrative divisions, often lumped together as local government units (LGUs). They are, from the highest to the lowest division:

1. Autonomous and administrative regions
2. Provinces and independent cities
3. Municipalities and component cities
4. Barangays

=== Regions ===
Regions are the highest administrative division in the Philippines, primarily used to coordinate planning and organize national services. Administrative regions are not local government units themselves but instead consist of several local government units. Meanwhile, autonomous regions are regions that have control over their governance, culture, and economy. The 1987 Constitution only allows for the creation of two autonomous regions, one in the Cordilleras of Luzon and another in Muslim Mindanao; at present, only the latter exists, with the former remaining an administrative division.

==== Bangsamoro ====
The Bangsamoro is an autonomous region located in Mindanao. Established in 2019, the region replaced the Autonomous Region in Muslim Mindanao. The region has a regional parliamentary system separate from the national presidential system. Its executive branch is led by the regional chief minister, the Council of Leaders, and the Bangsamoro Cabinet. Its legislative branch is the unicameral Bangsamoro Parliament. The region also has its own judiciary system that applies Sharia albeit it is subordinate to the Supreme Court of the Philippines.

=== Local legislative councils ===
- Sangguniang Panlalawigan (Provincial Council)
- Sangguniang Panlungsod (City Council)
- Sangguniang Bayan (Municipal Council)
- Sangguniang Barangay (Barangay Council)

=== Local government officials ===
- Provincial governor
- Provincial vice governor
- City/Municipal mayor
- City/Municipal vice mayor
- Barangay captain
