= Council of Leaders of Bangsamoro =

Council of Leaders
Agency overview
- Formed: 2021
- Jurisdiction: Bangsamoro
- Head responsible: Abdulraof Macacua, Chief Minister
- Key document: Bangsamoro Organic Law

The Council of Leaders is an advisory body mandated to assist the Chief Minister of the Bangsamoro Autonomous Region in Muslim Mindanao in governing the autonomous region.

== History ==
The Bangsamoro Organic Law (BOL), the charter legislation of the Bangsamoro Autonomous Region in Muslim Mindanao, mandates for the creation of a Council of Leaders which is intended to be an advisory body for the Chief Minister.

In June 2021. the Council of Leaders convened where they came up with a consensus to support the extension of the Bangsamoro transition period from 2022 to 2025.

Sometime in 2021, Administrative Order No. 8 was issued to determine guidelines on how to fill in the community and sectoral representatives of the council with the Bangsamoro Administrative Code (BAC) as basis. The BAC itself was signed into law in November 2020.

== Members ==
The Council of Leaders consists of both elected and nominated community and sectoral representatives. The holder of the Chief Minister position heads the council. The other elected members are the executive heads of Bangsamoro's provinces and chartered cities as well as members of the Philippine national government's House of Representatives from the autonomous region.

The term of the community and sectoral representatives are coterminous with the appointing chief minister unless otherwise removed from the cause.

=== Elected members ===
Head of Council
Name	Position	Notes
Abdulraof Macacua	Chief Minister	
Governors of Bangsamoro provinces
Name	Position	Notes
Hadjiman Hataman Salliman	Governor of Basilan	
Mamintal Adiong	Governor of Lanao del Sur	
Tucao Mastura	Governor of Maguindanao del Norte	
Ali Midtimbang	Governor of Maguindanao del Sur	
Yshmael Sali	Governor of Tawi-Tawi	
Members of the House of Representatives of the Philippines
Name	Position	Notes
Yusop Alano	Basilan lone district representative	
Zia Alonto Adiong	Lanao del Sur first district representative	
Yasser Balindong	Lanao del Sur second district representative	
Dimple Mastura	Maguindanao del Norte lone district representative	
Esmael Mangudadatu	Maguindanao del Sur lone district representative	
Dimszar Sali	Tawi-Tawi lone district representative	
Mayors of Chartered Cities
Name	Position	Notes
Bruce Matabalao	Mayor of Cotabato City	
Majul Gandamra	Mayor of Marawi	
Roderick Furigay	Mayor of Lamitan, Basilan	

=== Community and sectoral representatives ===
Community representatives
Represents	Name	Note
Traditional leaders	Mlang Madal	
Non-Moro indigenous communities	Ernie Moral	A Teduray bishop from Episcopal Diocese of Southern Philippines.
Women	Noni Lao	
Settler communities	Orlando Quevedo	Roman Catholic Cardinal
Ulama	Aboulkhair Tarason	Chair of the Basilan Ulama Supreme Council
Youth	Mohammad Abqary Alon	
BCOBAR	Malik Caril	
Sectoral representatives
Represents	Name	Note
Professionals	Tungko Tadtagan	
Business	Shalimar Candao	
Private Educational Institutions	Vacant	
Labor	Faisal Nahul	
Farmers	Musa Solaiman	

=== Former ===
- Troy Eric Cordero (Settler community) – Chair of Metro Cotabato Ministerial Fellowship
