= Michael Mastura =

Michael O. Mastura
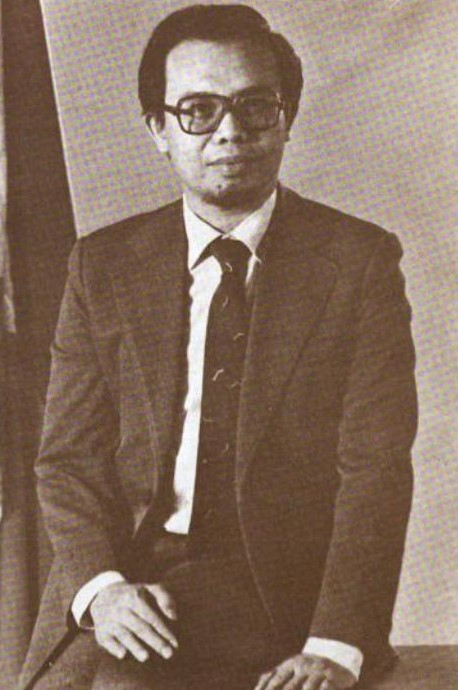

Member of the Philippine House of Representatives from Maguindanao's First District
- In office June 30, 1987 – June 30, 1995
- Preceded by: Post created
- Succeeded by: Didagen Dilangalen

Personal details
- Born: March 14, 1941 (age 85) Nuling, Cotabato, Philippine Commonwealth
- Party: Laban ng Demokratikong Pilipino
- Spouse: Lourdes Veloso-Mastura
- Relations: Brother: Tucao Mastura
- Education: Notre Dame University; Cotabato City Institute
- Occupation: Lawyer, Politician

Michael Ong Mastura (born March 14, 1941, Sultan Kudarat, Maguindanao) is a Philippine lawyer, author, and lecturer. He is a descendant of the 16th-century monarch Muhammad Kudarat, also known as Sultan Kudarat of Maguindanao. He served as Representative of the First District of Maguindanao and Cotabato City from 1987 to 1995.

Of Chinese ancestry, his parents migrated to the Philippines in the early 20th century.

He earned his Bachelor of Arts and Bachelor of Law degrees from Notre Dame University in Cotabato City, and his Master of Law degree from the University of the Philippines.

Mike Mastura served as a Delegate to the 1971 Constitutional Convention. In 1981, he was appointed as the first Deputy Minister for the Ministry of Muslim Affairs under Minister Romulo Espaldon. He also became Member of the Board of Regents of Mindanao State University and of the Southern Philippines Development Authority, and Member of the Mindanao Economic Council. He founded the Islamic Welfare Society of the Philippines and the Sultan Kudarat Islamic Academy, and co-founded the Southeast Asian Shariah Law Association. From 1984 to 1986, he was President and Chief Executive Officer of the Al-Amanah Islamic Bank.

He is the older brother of Maguindanao del Norte Governor Tucao Mastura and Mayor Armando Mastura of Sultan Mastura, Maguindanao del Norte.
