= Wa'lī of Bangsamoro =

Regional leader of Bangsamoro

- Filipino: Wali ng Bangsamoro; Arabic: والي من بانجسامورو
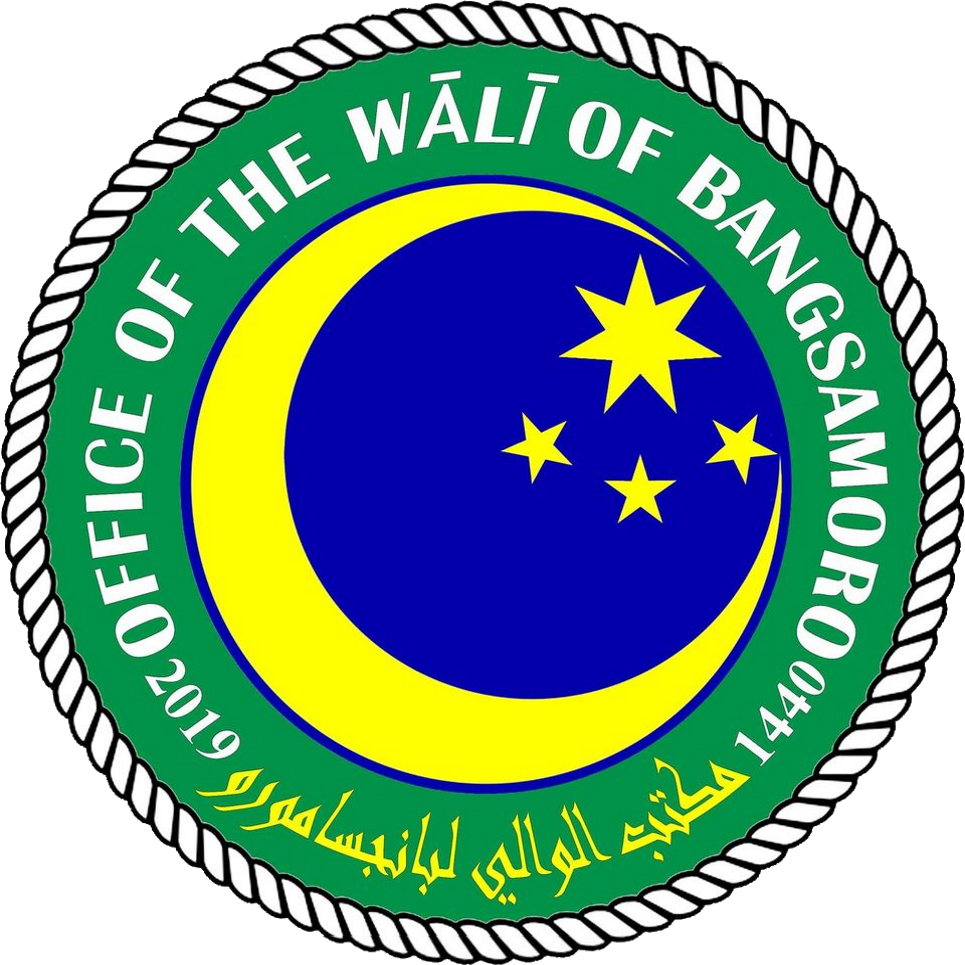
- Office seal

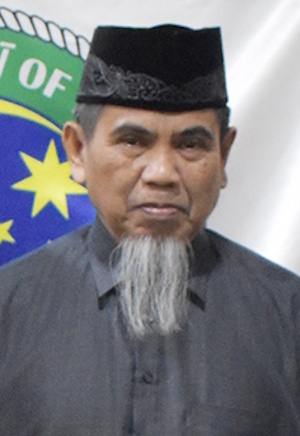
- Incumbent; Muslim Guiamaden since May 13, 2024
- Style: His Eminence
- Type: Ceremonial head
- Nominator: Council of Leaders
- Appointer: Bangsamoro Parliament
- Term length: 6 years
- Constituting instrument: Bangsamoro Organic Law
- Formation: March 29, 2019
- First holder: Khalipha Nando
- Website: wali.bangsamoro.gov.ph

The wa'lī of Bangsamoro or the Agong Al-Wa'lī is the ceremonial head of the Bangsamoro Autonomous Region in Muslim Mindanao, an autonomous region within the Philippines.

The first wa'lī, Khalipha Nando, was appointed by the interim Bangsamoro Parliament on March 29, 2019, during its inaugural session. Muslim Guiamaden has been the incumbent wa'lī since May 13, 2024.

== Background ==
=== Function ===
The Wa'lī is an elective position within the government of the Bangsamoro Autonomous Region and is considered the ceremonial head of the region. The holder of the position has the legal right to perform the following ceremonial functions: Moral guardianship of the region; preside over the opening of the Bangsamoro Parliament; administer oaths of office; dissolve Parliament on advice of the Chief Minister; call for the election of a new Parliament, and attend various public ceremonies.

The tenure of the Wa'lī is six years, except the first holder of the position which was appointed by the interim Bangsamoro Parliament, headed by the Bangsamoro Transition Authority which would hold office for only three years.

=== Eligibility ===
A Wa'lī must be at least 40 years old and a Filipino citizen by birth, according to law. They must be a registered voter in the Bangsamoro and a resident for at least 15 years, able to read and write in Filipino, English, and Arabic, as well as have no prior conviction of any criminal or administrative offense. The Wa'lī is elected by Parliament from a list of eligible individuals prepared by the Council of Leaders.

== List ==
No.	Portrait	Name (Lifespan)	Term start	Term end	Term length	Chief Minister (Tenure)	Parliament
1		Khalipha Nando (1941/1942–2023)	March 29, 2019	February 5, 2023 (Note: Died in office.)	3 years, 313 days	Murad Ebrahim (2019–2025 interim)	1st BTA
1		Khalipha Nando (1941/1942–2023)	March 29, 2019	February 5, 2023	3 years, 313 days	Murad Ebrahim (2019–2025 interim)	2nd BTA
—		Omarkhalid Ampatuan (born 1957); Officer in Charge	March 1, 2023	May 13, 2024	1 year, 73 days	Murad Ebrahim (2019–2025 interim)	2nd BTA
2		Muslim Guiamaden (born 1963)	May 13, 2024	Incumbent	302 days	Murad Ebrahim (2019–2025 interim)	2nd BTA
2		Muslim Guiamaden (born 1963)	May 13, 2024	Incumbent	1 year, 239 days	Abdulraof Macacua (2025-2026 interim)	2nd BTA
2		Muslim Guiamaden (born 1963)	May 13, 2024	Incumbent	7 days	Abdulraof Macacua (since 2026)	1st Parliament

Said Salendab has also served as acting Wali for the opening of the 2nd Regular Session of the 2nd Bangsamoro Transition Authority Parliament on May 15, 2023. However Salendab is not part of the official list of Wali in the Office of the Wali website.

== See also ==
- Wāli
