= Ainee Sinsuat =

Filipina politician

Bai Ainee Sinsuat
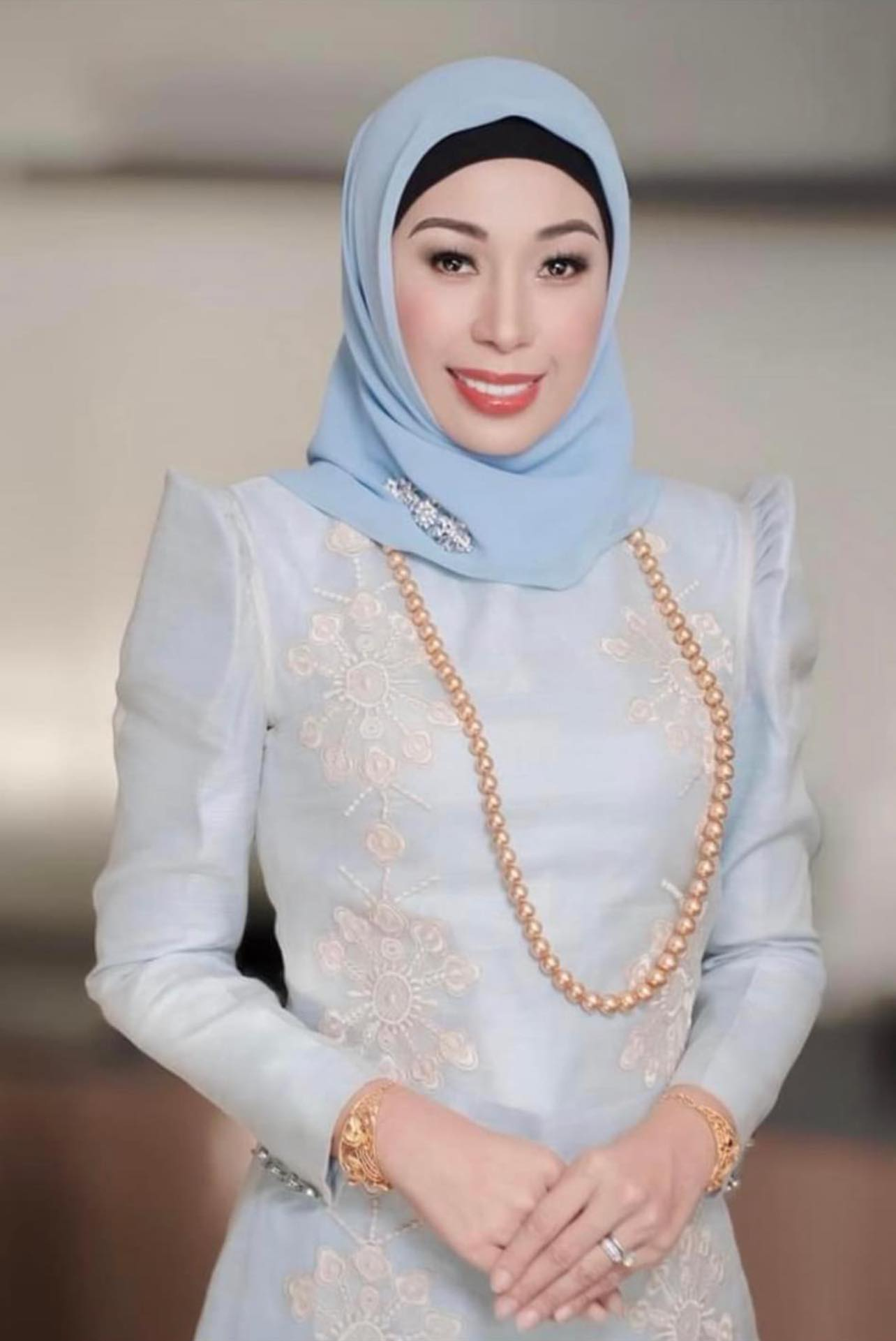
- Sinsuat in 2022

Acting Governor of Maguindanao del Norte
- In office August 14, 2023 – November 2023; Disputed with Abdulraof Macacua; unrecognized by the national and Bangsamoro governments
- Vice governor: Sharifudin Panga Mastura (also unrecognized)
- In office October 13, 2022 – April 5, 2023; Unrecognized by the national and Bangsamoro governments
- Vice governor: Sharifudin Panga Mastura (also unrecognized)
- Preceded by: Office established
- Succeeded by: Abdulraof Macacua (recognized Officer in Charge)

Vice Governor of Maguindanao del Norte
- In office April 28, 2023 – August 14, 2023; Officer in Charge
- Appointed by: Bongbong Marcos
- Governor: Abdulraof Macacua
- Preceded by: Sharifudin Panga Mastura (acting; unrecognized)
- Succeeded by: Sharifudin Panga Mastura (acting; unrecognized); Vacant (Note: Until Marshall Sinsuat was elected in 2025)

Vice Governor of Maguindanao
- In office June 30, 2022 – October 13, 2022; Hold-over capacity from September 17, 2022 (Note: Maguindanao was abolished following the 2022 plebiscite on September 17, 2022, to divide it into Maguindanao del Sur and Maguindanao del Norte. However, Mariam Mangudadatu continued to exercise the gubernatorial position until the officials for both provinces including the governor were to be determined.)
- Governor: Mariam Mangudadatu
- Preceded by: Lester Sinsuat
- Succeeded by: Office abolished

Personal details
- Born: Fatima Ainee Limbona
- Party: PFP (2024–present)
- Other political affiliations: Nacionalista (2022–2024)
- Spouse: Lester Sinsuat
- Occupation: Politician

Bai (Note: A feminine title of nobility used by Filipino Muslims) Fatima Ainee Limbona-Sinsuat is a Filipina politician who served as the last vice governor of Maguindanao prior to its split into two provinces. She then served as the Officer in Charge (OIC) vice governor of Maguindanao del Norte.

Sinsuat was elected vice governor of Maguindanao in 2022, succeeding her husband Lester. Shortly after, a plebiscite split Maguindanao into the new provinces of Maguindanao del Norte and Maguindanao del Sur. Citing the law for the plebiscite, she assumed the governorship of Maguindanao del Norte in an acting capacity on October 13, 2022. However, she was not recognized by the Bangsamoro regional government, arguing that her assumption of the governorship was legal only if the plebiscite had occurred before the 2022 elections. In April 2023, President Bongbong Marcos appointed Sinsuat as OIC vice governor of Maguindanao del Norte. Meanwhile, Abdulraof Macacua was appointed OIC governor. On August 14, 2023, Sinsuat vacated her position as vice governor and revived her claim as the legitimate acting governor, citing a Supreme Court ruling she believed was in her favor. Again, the Bangsamoro and national governments refused to recognize her claim. In November, the Supreme Court ruled that Sinsuat had effectively abandoned her claim to the governorship by accepting her appointment as vice governor earlier that year.

== Political career ==
In the 2022 elections, Sinsuat ran for vice governor of Maguindanao, the office her husband Lester was scheduled to vacate. Under the Nacionalista Party as the running mate of reelectionist governor Mariam Mangudadatu, both women won their respective races.

The vice governor and the next ranking elective member of the Sangguniang Panglalawigan of the present province of Maguindanao who are residents of the new Maguindanao del Norte, shall assume as its acting governor and vice governor, respectively, and both shall continue to serve in office until their successors shall have been elected and qualified in the 2022 national and local elections.

— Section 50 of Republic Act No. 11550

After the plebiscite that split Maguindanao into two provinces, Sinsuat was expected to become the first governor of Maguindanao del Norte, citing Section 50 of Republic Act No. 11550 (the legal basis of the plebiscite; see quote box). However, the postponement of the plebiscite caused uncertainties regarding the leadership of the new province. The relevant provision of the Maguindanao del Norte charter that assigns the interim provincial officials presumed that the plebiscite would be held before the May 9, 2022 general elections—but the plebiscite was postponed to September 17, 2022. The Commission on Elections then issued a legal opinion on September 28, concluding that only the Department of the Interior and Local Government could appoint interim officials of the new province.

Nonetheless, Sinsuat assumed the position of acting governor of Maguindanao del Norte on October 13, 2022. Meanwhile, provincial board member Sharifudin Mastura assumed the position of acting vice governor. However, the Bangsamoro regional government refused to recognize her as governor. Attorney Naguib Sinarimbo, the Bangsamoro Minister of the Interior and Local Government, argued that "the condition precedent for that rule to apply is no longer present because the plebiscite was held not prior to the 2022 local elections but after." Sinarimbo conveyed that the regional government was waiting for President Bongbong Marcos to appoint an acting governor for the new province. Due to the questionable legitimacy of the new provincial government under Sinsuat, her administration was not allowed to utilize the incoming year's ₱1.8 billion budget allocated by the national government. Thus, by early 2023, the Maguindanao del Norte provincial government was neither able to run its programs nor pay its employees' salaries. Since a provincial treasurer is required for the disbursement of provincial funds, in December 2022, Sinsuat requested the Bureau of Local Government Finance (BLGF) to designate one. The BLGF argued that Sinsuat had no legal personality to request for a provincial treasurer since her accession to the governorship was not covered by the transition process stated in Republic Act No. 11550. Sinsuat then filed a petition for mandamus at the Supreme Court in February 2023.

On April 5, 2023, Sinsuat was designated as Officer in Charge (OIC) vice governor of Maguindanao del Norte by President Marcos. Meanwhile, then-Senior Minister of Bangsamoro Abdulraof Macacua, who was endorsed by the Bangsamoro government, was named OIC governor. In connection with Sinsuat's petition for mandamus, the Supreme Court on April 19 issued a preliminary mandatory injunction ordering the BLGF to designate a provincial treasurer "effective immediately". In response to the court order, Sinsuat posted on social media: "I believe that the Supreme Court recognizes that my assumption into office as acting governor is legitimate." However, Minister Sinarimbo argued that the ruling did not address who should be the province's chief executive, but rather the appointment of a provincial treasurer. In light of the Supreme Court order, mayors of nine of the province's twelve towns issued a joint statement supporting Macacua's appointment as OIC governor. On April 28, Sinsuat together with Macacua and other appointed OIC officials of the provincial government, took their oaths of office before President Marcos at Malacañang Palace.

On August 14, 2023, Sinsuat vacated her position as vice governor and revived her claim as the legitimate acting governor of Maguindanao del Norte once again, citing the Supreme Court ruling on June 26 (but released on August 8) making permanent the preliminary mandatory injunction it had issued earlier. The decision also stated that Sinsuat "validly assumed office as governor ... but only in acting capacit[y] until elections for the permanent officials ... shall have been held." It also decided that even though the plebiscite was conducted after the May 2022 elections, "this does not invalidate Section 50". As a transitory provision, it "is intended to operate upon the effectivity of the law ... for we cannot simply allow the already existing Provinces of Maguindanao del Norte and Maguindanao del Sur to be without a set of officials or without any funds for their operations." Accordingly, Shariffudin Mastura also reassumed the position of acting vice governor. However, Sinarimbo argued that the Supreme Court decision was not final and executory and was taken out of context. The Bangsamoro regional government did not recognize Sinsuat's claim, and asserted that "Macacua is the only governor". In November 2023, the Supreme Court reversed the ruling, explaining that "the factual circumstances under which the Court issued its assailed June 26, 2023, Decision are drastically different from the present state of things...". The Supreme Court then decided that Sinsuat "is deemed to have abandoned her claim to the position of Governor of Maguindanao del Norte when she accepted her appointment, took her oath and assumed office as Vice Governor of Maguindanao del Norte" in April, making her case moot. The Supreme Court also issued a show cause order to Sinsuat asking her to explain why she should not be cited in contempt for her failure to promptly inform them of her appointment, oath taking, and assumption as vice governor in April.

In the 2025 elections, Sinsuat ran for the position she vacated. She was defeated by Marshall Sinsuat (United Bangsamoro Justice Party), a cousin of her husband.

== Electoral history ==
2022 Maguindanao vice gubernatorial election
Party	Candidate	Votes	%
Nacionalista	Ainee Sinsuat	303,013	55.85
UBJP	Bai Sandra Sema	234,591	43.24
PROMDI	Alpata Utto	2,679	0.49
Independent	Suraida Abdullah	1,506	0.28
Independent	Abdulhadi Hasim	724	0.13
Total votes		542,513	100.00

2025 Maguindanao del Norte vice gubernatorial election
Party	Candidate	Votes	%
UBJP	Marshall Sinsuat	198,233	73.23
PFP	Ainee Sinsuat	72,461	26.77
Total votes		270,694	100.00
