= Tucao Mastura =

Filipino politician

Datu Tucao O. Mastura
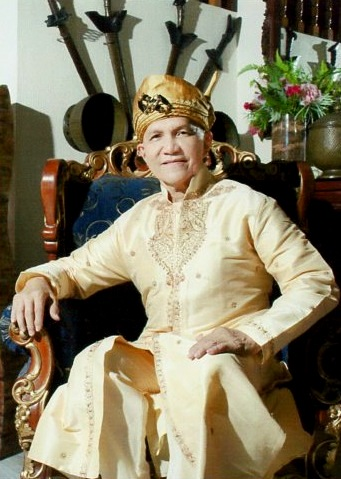
- Datu Mastura in Royal clothes

Governor of Maguindanao del Norte
- Incumbent
- Assumed office June 30, 2025
- Vice Governor: Marshall Sinsuat
- Preceded by: Datu Sharifudin Tucao P. Mastura

Mayor of Sultan Kudarat, Maguindanao del Norte
- In office June 30, 2022 – June 30, 2025
- Preceded by: Datu Shameem Mastura
- Succeeded by: Datu Shameem Mastura
- In office June 30, 2010 – June 30, 2013
- Preceded by: Bai Shajida Mastura-Bandila
- Succeeded by: Datu Shameem Mastura
- In office June 30, 2001 – June 30, 2007
- Preceded by: Bai Shajida Mastura-Bandila
- Succeeded by: Bai Shajida Mastura-Bandila
- In office July 1977 – June 30, 1998
- Preceded by: Hadji Datu Sanggacala Mamadra Baragui
- Succeeded by: Bai Shajida Mastura-Bandila

Governor of Shariff Kabunsuan
- In office June 30, 2007 – July 17, 2008
- Preceded by: Noraya S. Pasandalan
- Succeeded by: Position abolished

Member of the Bangsamoro Transition Authority Parliament
- In office March 29, 2019 – June 30, 2022
- Nominated by: Moro Islamic Liberation Front
- Appointed by: Rodrigo Duterte
- Chief Minister: Murad Ebrahim

Personal details
- Born: September 3, 1946 (age 80) Nuling, Cotabato, Philippines
- Party: PFP (2024–present); UBJP (2024–2026); BFP (2026–present)
- Other political affiliations: Lakas–CMD (until 2007); NPC (2007–2009); Liberal (2010–2012); PDP–Laban (2013–2024)
- Spouse: Bai Minda Biruar-Mastura
- Relations: Michael Mastura (brother)
- Education: Notre Dame University; Cotabato City Institute
- Occupation: Politician
- Profession: Certified Public Accountant

Datu Tucao Ong Mastura (Full birthname: Datu Ahmad Tucao Ong Mastura bin Sultan Kudarat; born September 3, 1946) is a Filipino politician who is the incumbent and the first-ever elected governor of the newly formed province of Maguindanao del Norte.

He is the younger brother of the lawyer, historian, professor and former Maguindanao First District and Cotabato City Congressman Datu Michael Mastura, and an older brother of Mayor Datu Armando Mastura of Sultan Mastura, Maguindanao del Norte. He is also the father of former provincial board member, vice governor and governor of Maguindanao del Norte, Datu Sharifudin Tucao Panga Mastura.

Datu Mastura is said to be the "kingmaker" of the Mastura clan, one of the biggest political families in Maguindanao del Norte.

== Early life, education and career ==
Datu Tucao O. Mastura came from a royal lineage that started its rule in the Sultanate of Maguindanao covering the entire Mindanao Island in Southern Philippines around the 12th century and ended in the 20th century. He was born on September 3, 1946, in Sultan Kudarat, Maguindanao del Norte. He is the second son of Datu Usngan Mastura, a prince, the great-grandson of Sultan Kudarat, the great ruler of the Sultanate of Maguindanao. He is a younger brother of Michael Mastura. Mastura had his elementary education in Cotabato City Institute (CCI). He graduated from Notre Dame University with a Bachelor of Science in Commerce in 1967, and became a Certified Public Accountant. He also took Bachelor of Laws from Notre Dame University in 1970. He started his profession as an accountant.

== Politics ==
=== Mayor of Sultan Kudarat ===
Mastura became mayor of Sultan Kudarat, Maguindanao del Norte in 1977.

His stint as the Chief Executive of the Municipality of Sultan Kudarat brought various honors and recognition for the town. In year 2011, a Seal of Good House Keeping was awarded by President Benigno Aquino III and then DILG Secretary Jesse Robredo, the same award was also given by the DILG Autonomous Region in Muslim Mindanao in 2010.

He had also received various awards of Excellence from President Joseph Estrada and twice with President Fidel V. Ramos, in 1999 and 1996 to 1997 respectively.

He received an award for Peace and Order given by the 6th Infantry Battalion in 1991, the 603rd Infantry Brigade in 1983 and the Southern Mindanao Command in 1977.

He was given an Outstanding Mayor award in 1989 and 1990 by the Department of the Interior and Local Government Region XII.

Mastura also made his presence through membership and representations of a range of organizations and delegations, starting with his Rotary Exchange to Houston, Texas in 1983; he was a member of the RP Peace Panel to Middle East on MNLF Problem in 1984 as well as in 1994, RP Peace Goodwill Mission to Red China in 1985.

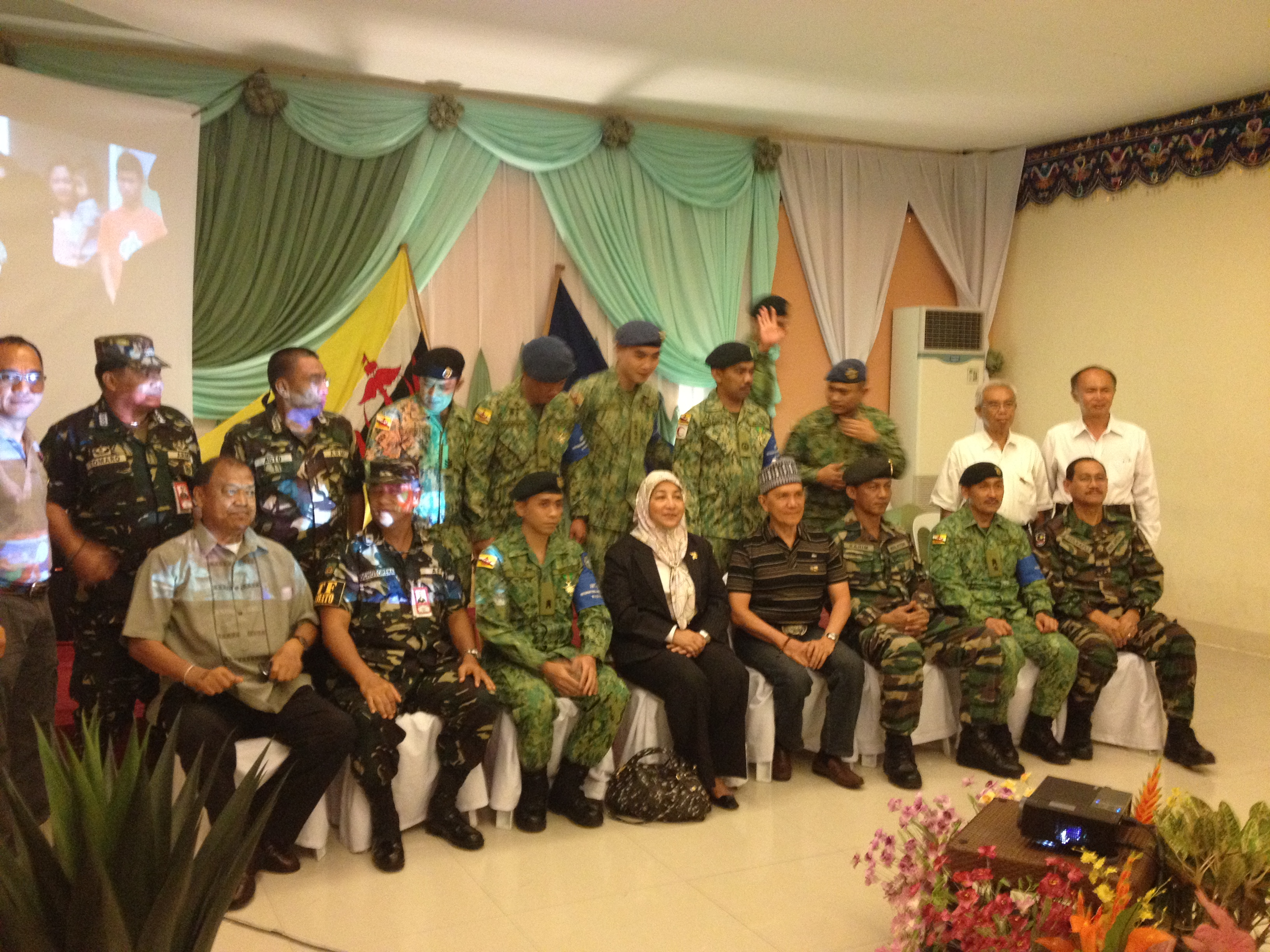
Mastura (center, in black shirt) with Brunei Ambassadress Malia Haji Yussof (in Mastura's right), his older brother Congressman Michael Mastura (second row, second from right, in white)and members of the International Monitoring Team.

He was an RP-ARMM representative on MNLF Peace Talk to Senegal in 1991, a member of the Representatives of the Al Khairiah Foundation to UAE in 1991.

He was one of the members of the Philippine Delegation to Toronto, Canada's 31st World Local Administrator Congress, and a member of the EAGA Conference to Indonesia and Malaysia both in 1995.

==== Creation of Sultan Mastura Municipality ====
As the result of the endorsement and planning of Mastura to further boost the development and progress of the Nuling (Sultan Kudarat) area, the Municipality of Sultan Mastura was created by virtue of the Muslim Mindanao Autonomy Act No. 89 dated September 13, 1999, and ratified through plebiscite on March 15, 2003. Its corporate existence started on April 28, 2003.

=== Shariff Kabunsuan gubernatorial election ===
In the 2007 Midterm Elections, Mastura ran for the position of governor in the newly created province of Shariff Kabunsuan, which was extracted from Maguindanao. Bimbo Sinsuat, the candidate of the opposing party was the protégé of Governor Datu Andal Ampatuan, Sr. Mastura was the strongest politician to oppose the power of the Ampatuans. Mastura won the elections. The province was then later abolished due to ARMM's creation of the province.

=== 2010 election ===
The Masturas were still the strongest rival of the Ampatuans. In the 2010 election, Mastura decided to run as mayor again. In the provincial elections, Esmael Mangudadatu, a vice mayor of the small town of Buluan ran against the Ampatuans, resulting to the gruesome Maguindanao massacre, where 57 people died, including journalists, lawyers and relatives of Mangudadatu while on their way to file his certificate of candidacy. The election-related-violence caught the attention of international media. Mangudadatu asked for the support of Mastura. The Mastura kingmaker, Datu Tucao decided to let Datu Ismael Mastura, his nephew, son of his brother Datu Michael run as the vice governor of Mangudadatu. Tucao declared his support and stayed as the campaign manager. The tandem won the elections.
