= Lanao del Sur Provincial Board =

Legislative body of the province of Lanao del Sur, Philippines

Lanao del Sur Provincial Board Sangguniang Panlalawigan ng Lanao del Sur

Type
- Type: Unicameral
- Term limits: 3 terms (9 years)

Leadership
- Presiding Officer: Mohamad Khalid R. Adiong, Lakas–CMD since June 30, 2019

Structure
- Seats: 13 board members 1 ex officio presiding officer
- Political groups: Lakas–CMD (7) PFP (1) UBJP (1) SIAP (1) TBD (1) Nonpartisan (2)
- Length of term: 3 years
- Authority: Local Government Code of the Philippines

Elections
- Voting system: Multiple non-transferable vote (regular members); Indirect election (ex officio members)
- Last election: May 12, 2025
- Next election: May 15, 2028

Meeting place
- Lanao del Sur Provincial Capitol, Marawi

The Lanao del Sur Provincial Board is the Sangguniang Panlalawigan (provincial legislature) of the Philippine province of Lanao del Sur.

The members are elected via plurality-at-large voting: the province is divided into two districts, each having five seats. A voter votes up to five names, with the top five candidates per district being elected. The vice governor is the ex officio presiding officer, and only votes to break ties. The vice governor is elected via the plurality voting system province-wide.

The districts used in appropriation of members is coextensive with the legislative districts of Lanao del Sur.

Aside from the regular members, the board also includes the provincial federation presidents of the Liga ng mga Barangay (ABC, from its old name "Association of Barangay Captains"), the Sangguniang Kabataan (SK, youth councils) and the Philippine Councilors League (PCL).

== Apportionment ==
Elections	Seats per district		Ex officio seats	Total seats
Elections	1st	2nd	Ex officio seats	Total seats
2010–present	5	5	3	13

== List of members ==
=== Current members ===
These are the members after the 2025 local elections and 2023 barangay and SK elections:

- Vice Governor: Mohamad Khalid R. Adiong (Lakas)

Seat	Board member	Party	Start of term	End of term
1st district	Cosain R. Capal II	Lakas	June 30, 2025	June 30, 2028
1st district	Ansari U. Gandamra	Lakas	June 30, 2022	June 30, 2028
1st district	Omar-Ali M. Sharief	PFP	June 30, 2025	June 30, 2028
1st district	Shirali S. Sani	Lakas	June 30, 2019	June 30, 2028
1st district	Mohammad Joharden M. Marohombsar	Lakas	June 30, 2025	June 30, 2028
2nd district	Mohammad Hafez B. Marohom	Lakas	June 30, 2025	June 30, 2028
2nd district	Abdullah S. Pacalna	SIAP	June 30, 2025	June 30, 2028
2nd district	Daongan M. Amerbitor	Lakas	June 30, 2025	June 30, 2028
2nd district	Taha-Tanjie P. Macapodi	Lakas	June 30, 2022	June 30, 2028
2nd district	Fahad M. Arimao	UBJP	June 30, 2022	June 30, 2028
ABC		Nonpartisan	July 30, 2018	January 1, 2023
PCL	TBD			June 30, 2028
SK	Jeff Adiong	Nonpartisan	June 8, 2018	January 1, 2023

=== Vice governor ===
Election year	Name	Party	Ref.
2016	Mamintal Adiong Jr.	Liberal	
2019	Mohammad Khalid R. Adiong	Lakas	
2022	Mohammad Khalid R. Adiong	Lakas	
2025	Mohammad Khalid R. Adiong	Lakas	

=== 1st district ===
- Population (2024):

Election year	Member (party)	Member (party)	Member (party)	Member (party)	Member (party)	Ref.
2016	Khomeini Taha (UNA)	Alzaif Munder (Liberal)	Esmael Mamarinta (UNA)	Hussein Magandia (UNA)	Zorab Mangotara (Liberal)	
2019	Alicozaman Mangata (Lakas)	Alzaif Munder (Lakas)	Shirali S. Sani (Nacionalista)	Nasser Ganda, Jr. (Lakas)	Zorab Mangotara (Lakas)	
2022	Ansari U. Gandamra (PDP–Laban)	Alzaif Munder (Lakas)	Shirali S. Sani (Lakas)	Nasser Ganda, Jr. (Lakas)	Zorab Mangotara (Lakas)	
2025	Ansari U. Gandamra (Lakas)	Cosain R. Capal II (Lakas)	Shirali S. Sani (Lakas)	Mohammad Joharden M. Marohombsar (Lakas)	Omar-Ali M. Sharief (PFP)	

=== 2nd district ===
- Population (2024):

Election year	Member (party)	Member (party)	Member (party)	Member (party)	Member (party)	Ref.
2016	Taha Macapodi (Liberal)	Caoden Marohombsar (Liberal)	Abdul Harris Macacua (Liberal)	Amron Maruhon (UNA)	Abdulhamid Amerbitor (Independent)	
2019	Soraida Macapodi (Lakas)	Caoden Marohombsar (Lakas)	Allan G. Panolong (Lakas)	Amir-oden Balindong (Independent)	Abdulhamid Amerbitor (Lakas)	
2022	Taha-Tanjie P. Macapodi (Lakas)	Bubuly Decampong (Aksyon)	Allan G. Panolong (Lakas)	Fahad M. Arimao (PDP–Laban)	Abdulhamid Amerbitor (Lakas)	
2025	Taha-Tanjie P. Macapodi (Lakas)	Mohammad Hafez B. Marohom (Lakas)	Daongan M. Amerbitor (Lakas)	Fahad M. Arimao (UBJP)	Abdullah S. Pacalna (SIAP)	
