= Khalipha Nando =

Moro leader (died 2023)

Sheikh Khalipha Nando
- خليفة ناندو
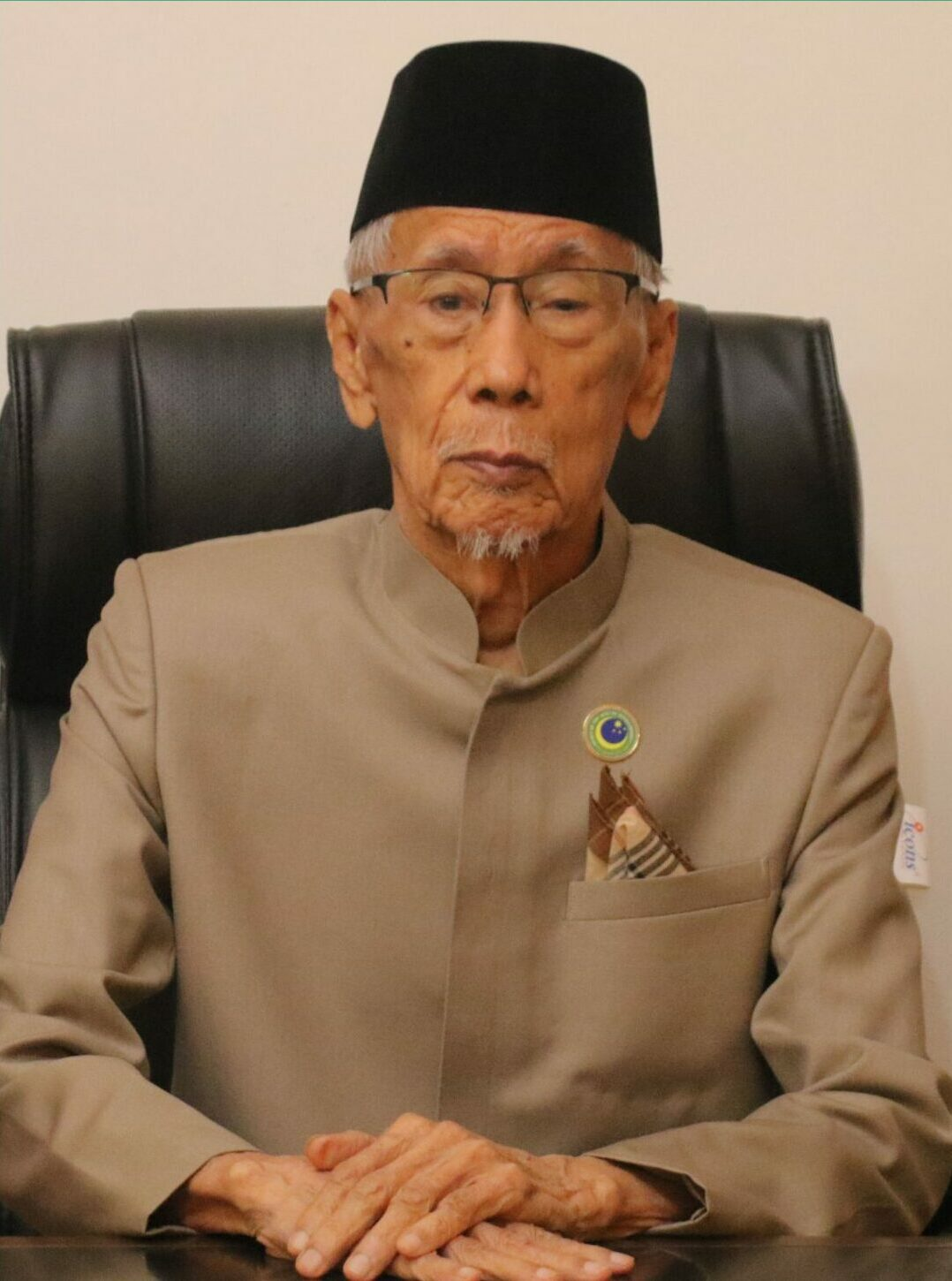

Wa'lī of Bangsamoro
- In office March 29, 2019 – February 5, 2023
- Appointed by: Bangsamoro Transition Authority Parliament
- Chief Minister: Murad Ebrahim
- Preceded by: Position established
- Succeeded by: Omarkhalid Ampatuan (OIC)

Personal details
- Born: 1941 or 1942
- Died: February 5, 2023 (aged 81) Davao City, Philippines
- Resting place: Pandag, Maguindanao del Sur, Philippines
- Education: Al-Azhar University

Military service
- Allegiance: Moro Islamic Liberation Front (MILF)

Sheikh Khalipha Usman Nando (Note: Official communications and documents from the Bangsamoro Parliament uses "Khalipha," though the name has been alternatively spelled "Khalifa.") (Arabic: ا لشيخ خليفة عثمان ناندو; 1941 or 1942 – February 5, 2023) was the first Wa'lī of Bangsamoro, and one of the co-founders of the Moro Islamic Liberation Front.

== Education ==
Nando attended the Madrasah Al-Rasheedah in Pandag, which was then part of the town of Buluan in the Province of Cotabato. He would secure a diplomatic scholarship to study at Al-Azhar University. Nando studied at the institution in Cairo, Egypt in the early 1960s.

== Moro Islamic Liberation Front ==
Khalipha Usman Nando was one of the co-founders of the Moro Islamic Liberation Front (MILF) along with Salamat Hashim and Abu Hurayra; the former being Nando's schoolmate and associate at Al-Azhar. As part of the MILF, Nando served under various capacities including as chairman of the MILF Central Committee on Education, chairman of Majlis Al-Shura (Consultative Assembly) and as head of the MILF Sharia Supreme Court.

== Wa'lī of Bangsamoro ==
Nando, was appointed the first Wa'lī of the newly constituted Bangsamoro autonomous region by the interim Bangsamoro Parliament on March 29, 2019, during the inaugural session of the first interim meeting. He would likewise open the inaugural session of the second interim Parliament on September 15, 2022.

His last public appearance prior to his death was on January 25, 2023, for the fourth anniversary of the establishment of the Bangsamoro autonomous region, as well as the turnover ceremony of facilities for orphans and a grand mosque in Matanog.

== Death ==
Nando died in a hospital in Davao on February 5, 2023, at the age of 81. His body was buried at his residence in Pandag, Maguindanao del Sur.
