= Tawi-Tawi Provincial Board =

Legislative body of the province of Tawi-Tawi, Philippines

Tawi-Tawi Provincial Board Sangguniang Panlalawigan ng Tawi-Tawi

Type
- Type: Unicameral
- Term limits: 3 terms (9 years)

Leadership
- Presiding Officer: Al-Syed A. Sali, PFP since June 30, 2025

Structure
- Seats: 16 board members 1 ex officio presiding officer
- Political groups: PFP (7) PDP–Laban (1) Independent (1) TBD (1) Nonpartisan (5)
- Length of term: 3 years
- Authority: Local Government Code of the Philippines

Elections
- Voting system: Multiple non-transferable vote (regular members); Indirect election (ex officio members); Acclamation (sectoral members)
- Last election: May 12, 2025
- Next election: May 15, 2028

Meeting place
- Tawi-Tawi Provincial Capitol, Bongao

The Tawi-Tawi Provincial Board is the Sangguniang Panlalawigan (provincial legislature) of the Philippine province of Tawi-Tawi.

The members are elected via plurality-at-large voting. The province is divided into two districts, each with four seats. A voter votes for up to four names, with the top four candidates per district being elected. The vice governor is the ex officio presiding officer and only votes to break ties. The vice governor is elected via the plurality voting system province-wide.

The districts used in appropriating members are not coextensive with the legislative district of Tawi-Tawi; unlike congressional representation, which is at-large, Tawi-Tawi is divided into two districts for representation in the Sangguniang Panlalawigan.

Aside from the regular members, the board also includes the provincial federation presidents of the Liga ng mga Barangay (ABC, from its old name, "Association of Barangay Captains"), the Sangguniang Kabataan (SK, youth councils) and the Philippine Councilors League (PCL). Tawi-Tawi's provincial board also has reserved seats for the sectoral representatives for women, agricultural workers, and businessmen.

== Apportionment ==
Elections	Seats per district		Ex officio seats	Reserved seats	Total seats
Elections	1st	2nd	Ex officio seats	Reserved seats	Total seats
2010–2025	4	4	3	3	14
2025-Present	6	4	3	3	16

== List of members ==
=== Current members ===
These are the members after the 2025 local elections and 2023 barangay and SK elections:

- Vice Governor: Al-Syed A. Sali (PFP)

Seat	Board member	Party	Start of term	End of term
1st district	Rodel R. Akip	Independent	June 30, 2025	June 30, 2028
1st district	Mark Renil T. Samsuya	PFP	June 30, 2019	June 30, 2028
1st district	Edzfar S. Ladjahali	PFP	June 30, 2025	June 30, 2028
1st district	Michael K. Ahaja	PFP	June 30, 2025	June 30, 2028
1st district	Ershad T. Abdurahman	PFP	June 30, 2025	June 30, 2028
1st district	Arron Fhadz C. Ahamad	PDP-Laban	June 30, 2025	June 30, 2028
2nd district	Alshid L. Mohammad Ali	PFP	June 30, 2025	June 30, 2028
2nd district	Jonel I. Mohammad Monel	PFP	June 30, 2025	June 30, 2028
2nd district	Alfilrada M. Ladjabassal	Independent	June 30, 2025	June 30, 2028
2nd district	Melhan J. Masdal	PFP	June 30, 2025	June 30, 2028
ABC	Hasanal Sali	Nonpartisan	July 30, 2018	January 1, 2023
PCL				June 30, 2022
SK	Maharie Hairil	Nonpartisan	June 8, 2018	January 1, 2023
Agriculture	Amilbajar Jamalul	Nonpartisan		
Business	John Anthony Lim	Nonpartisan		
Women	Dayang Jumaide	Nonpartisan		

== Past members ==
=== Vice governor ===
Election year	Name	Party	Ref.
2016	Michail K. Ahaja	NUP	
2019	Michail K. Ahaja	NUP	
2022	Michail K. Ahaja	NUP	
2025	Al-Syed A. Sali	PFP	

=== 1st district ===
- Population (2024):

Election year	Member (party)	Member (party)	Member (party)	Ref.
2016	Allan A. Ahamad (NUP)	Sabuddin N. Abdurahim (NUP)	—	
2016	Edzfar S. Ladjahali (Liberal)	Mohammad Yusof A. Tidal (Independent)	—	
2019	Mark Renil M. Samsuya (NUP)	Sabuddin N. Abdurahim (NUP)	—	
2019	Allan A. Ahamad (NUP)	Mohammad Yusof A. Tidal (NUP)	—	
2022	Mark Renil M. Samsuya (Tawi-Tawi One Party)	Sabuddin N. Abdurahim (Tawi-Tawi One Party)	—	
2022	Allan A. Ahamad (Tawi-Tawi One Party)	Mohammad Yusof A. Tidal (Tawi-Tawi One Party)	—	
2025	Mark Renil M. Samsuya (PFP)	Edzfar S. Ladjahali (PFP)	Arron Fhadz C. Ahamad (PDP–Laban)	
2025	Michael K. Ahaja (PFP)	Ershad T. Abdurahman (PFP)	Rodel R. Akip (Independent)	

=== 2nd district ===
- Population (2024):

Election year	Member (party)	Member (party)	Member (party)	Member (party)	Ref.
2016	Sukarno U. Asri (Liberal)	Nasser M. Habe (Liberal)	Habib Ismael A. Masdal (Liberal)	Elmasia L. Madjilon (Liberal)	
2019	Sukarno U. Asri (NUP)	Abdul Jamil S. Ishmael (NUP)	Habib Ismael A. Masdal (NUP)	Mahmud A. Bawasanta (PDP–Laban)	
2022	Sukarno U. Asri (Tawi-Tawi One Party)	Abdul Jamil S. Ishmael (Tawi-Tawi One Party)	Habib Ismael A. Masdal (Tawi-Tawi One Party)	Mahmud A. Bawasanta (Tawi-Tawi One Party)	
2025	Alshid L. Mohammad Ali (PFP)	Jonel I. Mohammad Monel (PFP)	Melhan J. Masdal (PFP)	Alfilrada M. Ladjabassal (Independent )	
