= Governor of Maguindanao del Norte =

Local chief executive

- Punong Lalawigan ng Hilagang Maguindanao
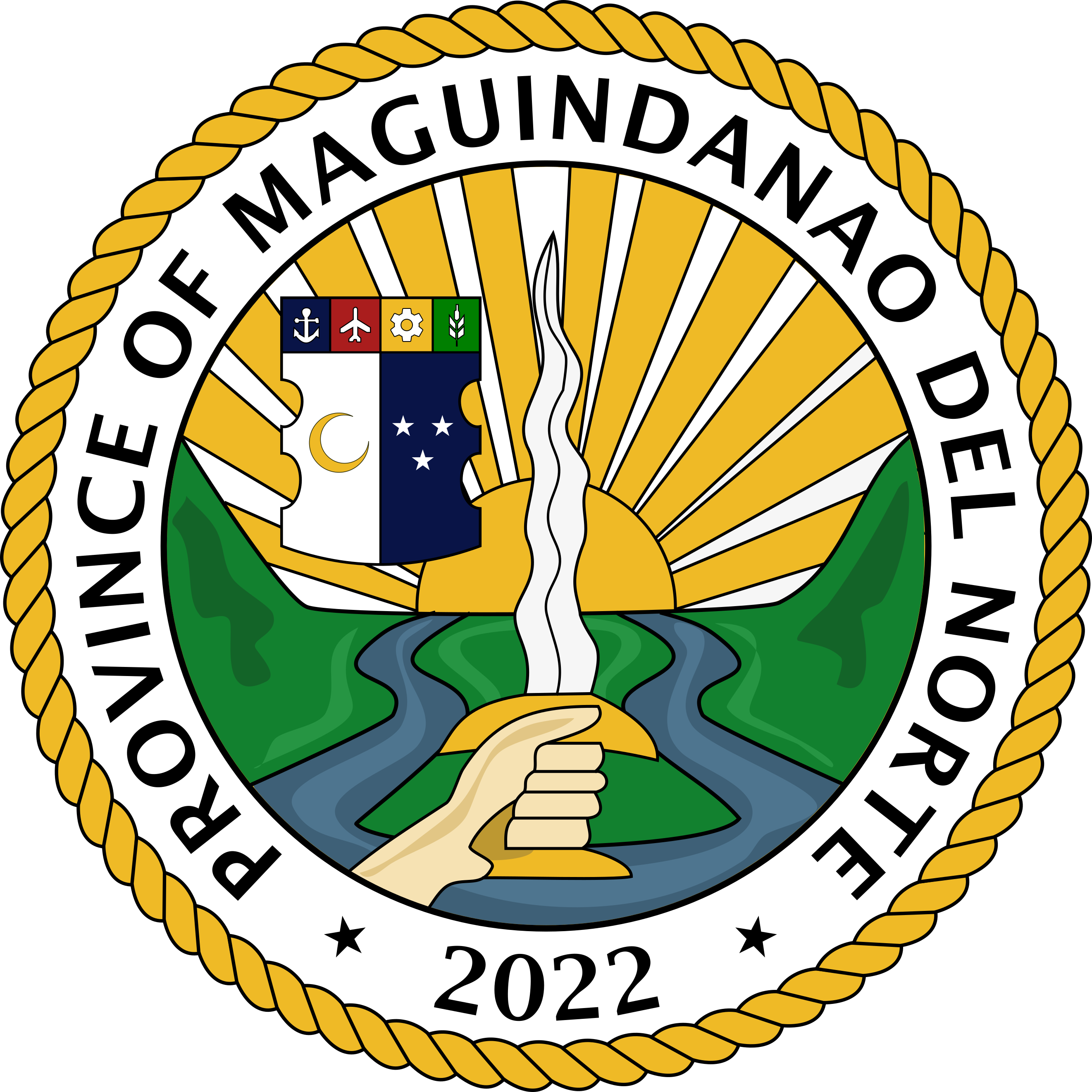
- Seal of the province of Maguindanao del Norte

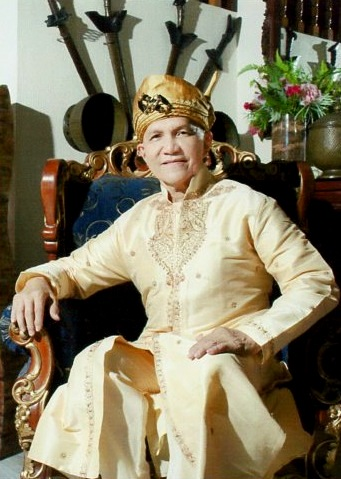
- Incumbent; Tucao Ong Mastura since June 30, 2025
- Style: Honorable (formal); Mr./Madame Governor (informal)
- Term length: 3 years
- Inaugural holder: Ainee Sinsuat; Abdulraof Macacua (Note: As recognized by the Bangsamoro regional and Philippine national governments.)
- Formation: October 13, 2022

The governor of Maguindanao del Norte is the highest political office in the province of Maguindanao del Norte, Philippines.

== History ==
Following the 2022 Maguindanao division plebiscite of September 17, 2022, Maguindanao was split into Maguindanao del Sur and Maguindanao del Norte provinces. The charter legislation of the two provinces, Republic Act No. 11550 provides for an acting governors for the newly formed subdivisions. Ainee Sinsuat, the last vice governor of Maguindanao was supposed to assume the position of governor of Maguindanao del Norte. However this was uncertain, since the relevant provision which dictates the initial province officials presumes that the plebiscite would be held before the May 2022 national elections but the division vote was postponed after that date.

Sinsuat would assumed the position of governor of Maguindanao del Norte nevertheless, which was unrecognized by the Bangsamoro regional government. On April 5, 2023, President Bongbong Marcos appointed Abdulraof Macacua as the Officer in Charge (OIC) governor of the province. Sinsuat, who had presumably assumed the role of acting governor, would be named as OIC vice governor. On April 28, 2023, President Bongbong Marcos reappointed Macacua as the full fledged governor of the Maguindanao del Norte together with other officials of the provincial government.

On August 14, 2023, Sinsuat vacated her position as vice governor and revived her claim as the legitimate acting governor of Maguindanao del Norte once again. The Bangsamoro regional government does not recognize Sinsuat's claim. In November 2023, the Supreme Court ruled that Sinsuat had abandoned her claim when she took oath as vice governor in April.

== List of governors ==
No.	Portrait	Governor Office (Note: Office before became/elected Governor.) (Lifespan)	Party	Term of office			Election	City/Municipality	Vice Governor	
No.	Portrait	Governor Office (Lifespan)	Party	start	end	duration	Election	City/Municipality	Vice Governor	
– (Note: Acting governor; self-appointed)		Fatima Ainee Limbona-Sinsuat; Vice Governor of Maguindanao (born 1986)	Nacionalista	13 October 2022	05 April 2023	2 years, 174 days	—	Datu Odin Sinsuat	Nacionalista	Sharifudin Tucao P. Mastura (2022–2023)
– (Note: Appointed officer in charge.)		Abdulraof A. Macacua; Member of the Bangsamoro Transition Authority Parliament (born 1957)	UBJP	28 April 2023 (Note: Macacua served as the Officer–in–Charge from April 5 to April 28, 2023.)	26 March 2025	1 year, 332 days	—	Kabuntalan	Nacionalista	Fatima Ainee Limbona-Sinsuat (Note: Self-appointed as acting governor from August 14, 2023. Considers to have "reassumed" the position based on a June 2023 Supreme Court ruling. Decision revoked in November 2023) (2023–2025)
–		Abdulraof A. Macacua; Member of the Bangsamoro Transition Authority Parliament (born 1957)	UBJP	28 April 2023	26 March 2025	1 year, 332 days	—	Kabuntalan	PFP	Fatima Ainee Limbona-Sinsuat (2023–2025)
– (Note: Appointed acting governor.)		Sharifudin Tucao P. Mastura; Member of the Maguindanao del Norte Provincial Board	Nacionalista	26 March 2025	30 June 2025	101 days	—	Sultan Kudarat	UBJP	Abdulnasser A. Abas (2025)
1		Tucao O. Mastura; Mayor of Sultan Kudarat (born 1946)	UBJP	30 June 2025	Incumbent	1 year, 69 days	2025	Sultan Kudarat	UBJP	Marshall I. Sinsuat (2025–Incumbent)
