= Yshmael Sali =

Filipino politician (born 1964)

The Honorable Yshmael Sali إِشْمَئِلْ سَلِ
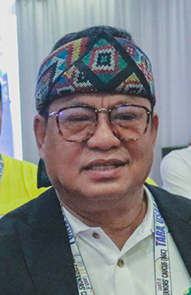
- Sali in 2023

Governor of Tawi-Tawi
- Incumbent
- Assumed office June 30, 2019
- Preceded by: Rashidin Matba

Mayor of Languyan
- In office June 30, 2013 – June 30, 2019

Personal details
- Born: March 10, 1964 (age 62) Parang, Sulu, Philippines
- Party: PFP (2024–present); TOP (local party)
- Other political affiliations: NUP (2016–2024); UNA (2013–2016)
- Occupation: Politician

Yshmael "Mang" Ismail Sali (born March 10, 1964) is a Filipino politician from the province of Tawi-Tawi, Philippines. He currently serves as Governor of the province. He was first elected as Governor in 2019.

He was formerly a barangay captain from 1988 to 1994 and mayor of Languyan, Tawi-Tawi.

== As governor ==
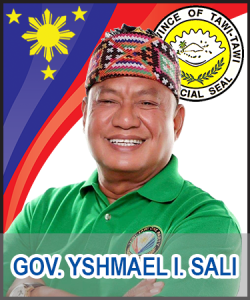
Official portrait as governor

As governor, Sali has launched a Passport-on-Wheels (POW) initiative in Tawi-Tawi, held from January 9–12, 2024 at the Datu Amirbahar Jaafar Convention Center in collaboration with the Department of Foreign Affairs (DFA). This program sought to facilitate seamless passport issuance for the community in the province.

In terms of diplomacy, Sali viewed Sabah as a significant economic partner.
