= 2nd Bangsamoro Transition Authority Parliament =

Interim Parliament in the Philippines

←	1st Bangsamoro Transition Authority Parliament	1st Bangsamoro Parliament	→
- Bangsamoro Parliament Building (2021)

Overview
- Legislative body: Bangsamoro Parliament
- Jurisdiction: Bangsamoro Autonomous Region in Muslim Mindanao, Philippines
- Meeting place: Bangsamoro Parliament Building, BARMM Complex, Brgy. Rosary Heights VII, Cotabato City
- Term: September 15, 2022 – October 22, 2026
- Members: 80
- Speaker: Pangalian Balindong (until October 2, 2025); Mohammad Yacob (from October 21, 2025)
- Deputy Speakers: Hatimil Hassan (until May 21, 2025); Nabil Tan; Omar Yasser Sema; Lanang Ali Jr.; Paisalin Tago (until May 21, 2025); Abdulkarim Misuari; Benjamin Loong (until May 21, 2025); Don Mustapha Loong (from May 21, 2025); John Anthony Lim (May 21 – October 21, 2025); Laisa Alamia (from May 21, 2025); Amenodin Sumagayan (from May 21, 2025); Suwaib Oranon (from May 21, 2025); Baintan Ampatuan (from May 21, 2025); Ishak Mastura (from May 21, 2025); Adzfar Usman (from May 21, 2025); Jose Lorena (from October 21, 2025); Sha Elijah Dumama-Alba (from October 21, 2025)
- Floor Leader: Sha Elijah Dumama-Alba (until October 21, 2025); John Anthony Lim (from October 21, 2025)

Sessions
- 1st: September 15, 2022 – March 21, 2022
- 2nd: May 15, 2023 – February 29, 2024
- 3rd: May 14, 2024 – February 27, 2025
- 4th: April 8, 2025 – January 29, 2026

The 2nd Bangsamoro Transition Authority (BTA) Parliament was the second interim Bangsamoro Parliament, the legislature of the transitional regional government of Bangsamoro.

It was composed of members of the Bangsamoro Transition Authority appointed by President Bongbong Marcos. A new set of BTA members was appointed on August 12, 2022.

It succeeded the 1st BTA Parliament, which served from 2019 to 2022, and held its inaugural session on September 15, 2022. Its first regular session opened on September 20, 2022.

On March 15, 2025, President Marcos administered the oath of office to 77 members of the BTA Parliament, 19 of whom were new members. On the same day, Abdulraof Macacua succeeded Murad Ebrahim as interim chief minister. The Parliament's fourth regular session opened on April 8, 2025.

The United Tausug Citizens of the Sultanate of Sulu petitioned the Department of Justice to have Sharif Jubar Muhammad appointed as chief minister and 50 other individuals appointed to parliamentary positions. The petition was dismissed as moot and academic following a Supreme Court ruling that excluded Sulu from the Bangsamoro region.

== Leadership ==
For the second parliament, the position of majority and minority leaders were discontinued. Sha Elijah Dumama-Alba was initially named as majority leader with no minority leader named. Dumama-Alba was later redesignated as floor leader.

Speaker

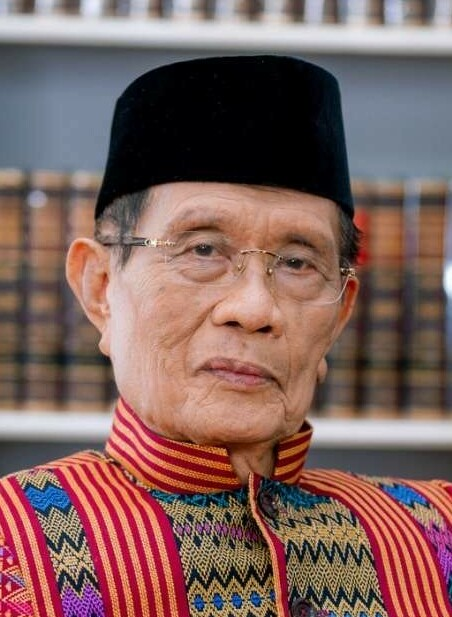
Pangalian Balindong,
until October 2, 2025

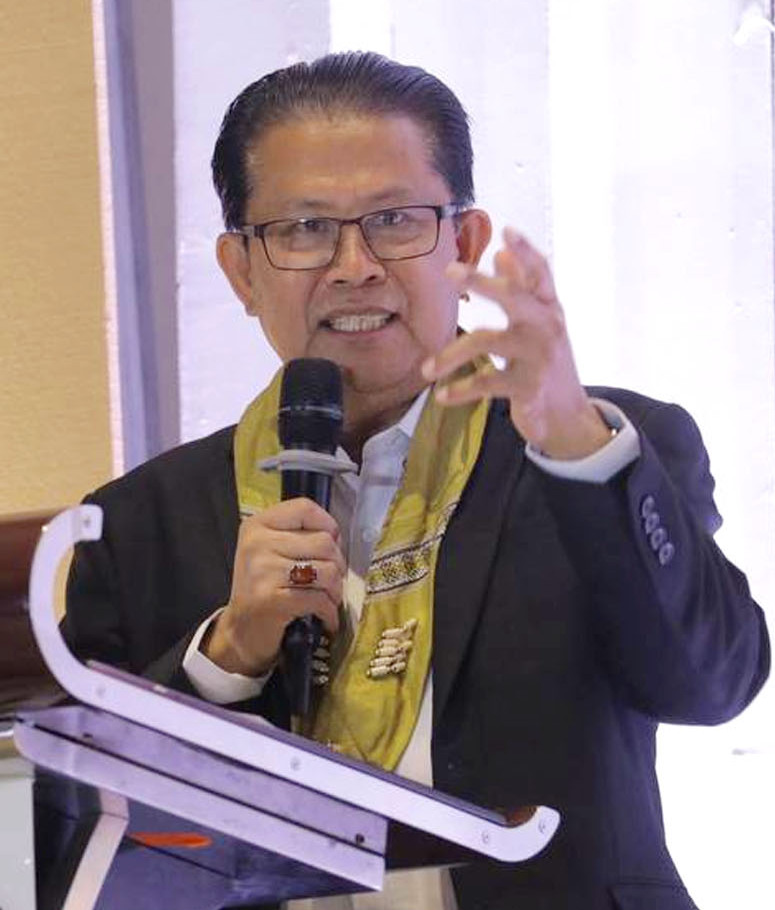
Mohammad Yacob,
from October 21, 2025

- Speaker:
  - Pangalian Balindong (MILF), until October 2, 2025
  - Mohammad Yacob (MILF), from October 21, 2025
- Deputy Speakers:
  - Hatimil Hassan (National Government), until May 21, 2025
  - Nabil Tan (National Government)
  - Omar Yasser Sema (National Government)
  - Lanang Ali Jr. (MILF)
  - Paisalin Tago (National Government), until May 21, 2025
  - Abdulkarim Misuari (National Government)
  - Benjamin Loong (MILF), until May 21, 2025
  - Don Mustapha Loong (National Government), from May 21, 2025
  - John Anthony Lim (National Government), May 21 – October 21, 2025
  - Laisa Alamia (National Government), from May 21, 2025
  - Amenodin Sumagayan (National Government), from May 21, 2025
  - Suwaib Oranon (MILF), from May 21, 2025
  - Baintan Ampatuan (National Government), from May 21, 2025
  - Ishak Mastura (National Government), from May 21, 2025
  - Adzfar Usman (National Government), from May 21, 2025
  - Jose Lorena (National Government), from October 21, 2025
  - Sha Elijah Dumama-Alba (MILF), from October 21, 2025
- Floor Leader:
  - Sha Elijah Dumama-Alba (MILF), until October 21, 2025
  - John Anthony Lim (National Government), from October 21, 2025

== Sessions ==
- First Regular Session: September 15, 2022 – March 21, 2023
- Second Regular Session: May 15, 2023 – February 29, 2024
- Third Regular Session: May 14, 2024 – February 27, 2025
- Fourth Regular Session: April 8, 2025 – October 22, 2026 (Note: The Fourth Regular Session was initially scheduled to end on October 29, 2025, but was extended to January 29, 2026. It was later extended again to October 22, 2026.)

== Composition ==
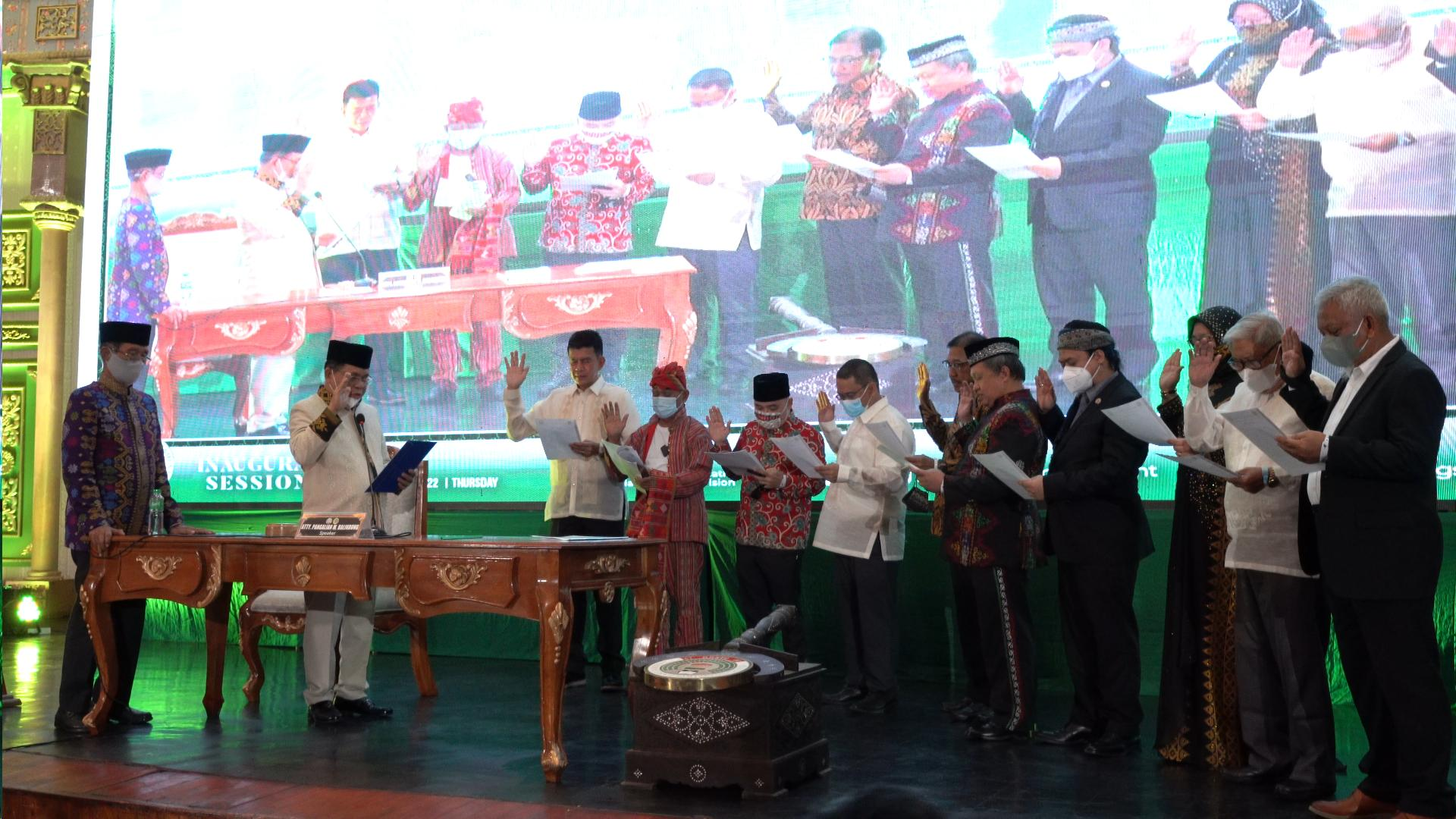
Oath-taking of new officers for the 2nd BTA parliament.

MPs	At start	At end
Moro Islamic Liberation Front nominees	41	38
National Government nominees	39	38
Vacant	0	4
Total	80	80

The interim Bangsamoro Parliament's mandate was supposed to end on June 30, 2022, as per the Bangsamoro Organic Law, but this was extended to 2025 by law passed by President Rodrigo Duterte whose presidency ended on the same day the interim parliament is supposed to be dissolved.

Duterte's successor President Bongbong Marcos appointed a new set of members for the interim parliament. 49 were reappointed while are 31 new members. The composition of 41 MILF nominees and 39 government nominees were still retained. The MILF nominees include people associated with the MNLF — eight from the Sema-Jikiri faction and seven from the Nur Misuari's faction. Misuari's group became part of the parliament for the first time.

The BTA under President Marcos would be informally referred to as "BTA 2" while the BTA under Duterte became retroactively known as "BTA 1".

An inaugural session with the new set of members appointed by Marcos was held on September 15, 2022. A new set of officials was elected as well, including Pangalian Balindong who was again elected as speaker. Additional officers were elected and the minority and majority leader position were abolished on the first regular session on September 20, 2022.

When Sulu was excluded from the Bangsamoro in September 2024 via a Supreme Court decision, the status of MPs based in Sulu was put into question. Only President Bongbong Marcos can decide on their tenure.

== Graphical representation ==
This is the graphical representation of the 2nd Bangsamoro Transition Authority showing its make-up (as of October 2, 2025): (Note: This is not the official seating plan of the Bangsamoro Parliament.)

Composition since October 2, 2025

== List of MPs ==
Name	Nominated by
Akmad Abas	MILF
Haron Abas (Note: Haron Abas died on June 28, 2026.)	MILF
Basit Abbas	MILF
Mudjib Abu	MILF
Rashdi Adiong (Note: Took office on March 15, 2025.)	National Government
Laisa Alamia	National Government
Mosber Alauddin	MILF
Ibrahim Ali (Note: Incumbent MPs who were not reappointed in March 2025.)	MILF
Lanang Ali Jr.	MILF
Eddie Alih	MILF
Suharto Ambolodto	National Government
Abdulaziz Amenodin	MILF
Baintan Ampatuan	National Government
Susana Anayatin	National Government
Mohammad Kelie Antao	National Government
Tomanda Antok	MILF
Mary Ann Arnado	MILF
Haber Asarul	National Government
Dan Asnawie	MILF
Ali Montaha Babao	National Government
Ahmad Amir Balindong	National Government
Pangalian Balindong (Note: Pangalian Balindong died on October 2, 2025.)	MILF
Anna Tarhata Basman	MILF
Zulfikar-Ali Bayam	National Government
Abdulbasit Benito	MILF
Bai Maleiha Candao	MILF
Ma-Arouph Candao	MILF
Uttoh Salem Cutan	National Government
Hashemi Dilangalen	National Government
Sha Elijah Dumama-Alba	MILF
Muhammad Nadzir Ebil	National Government
Murad Ebrahim (Note: Murad Ebrahim was one of the 58 incumbent MPs reappointed in March 2025, but refused his seat.)	MILF
Suharto Esmael	MILF
Matarul Estino	MILF
Abdullah Gayak	MILF
Amirodddin Gayak	MILF
Eduard Guerra	MILF
Khalid Hadji Abdullah	National Government
Abdullah Hashim	MILF
Hatimil Hassan	National Government
Abrar Hataman	National Government
Ibrahim Ibay	MILF
Mohagher Iqbal	MILF
Rasul Ismael	National Government
Raissa Jajurie	MILF
Muslimin Jakilan	National Government
Albakil Jikiri	National Government
Saripuddin Jikiri	National Government
Kitem Kadatuan Jr.	MILF
Denmartin Kahalan	National Government
Bai Ali Karon (Note: Took office on March 24, 2025.)	National Government
Faisal Karon	National Government
John Anthony Lim	National Government
Benjamin Loong	MILF
Don Mustapha Loong	National Government
Jose Lorena	National Government
Abdulraof Macacua (Note: Abdulraof Macacua resigned on April 5, 2023, upon his appointment as Governor of Maguindanao del Norte. Macacua retook office on March 15, 2025, upon his appointment as Chief Minister of Bangsamoro.)	MILF
Jamel Macacua (Note: Jamel Macacua was appointed on January 26, 2024, to replace Abdulraof Macacua. He was not among the incumbent MPs who were reappointed in March 2025.)	MILF
Marjanie Macasalong	MILF
Amroussi Macatanong	MILF
Tarhata Maglangit	National Government
Abdullah Makapaar	MILF
Butch Malang	MILF
Hamid Malik	National Government
Baileng Mantawil	MILF
Ishak Mastura	National Government
Jaafar Apollo Mikhail Matalam	National Government
Amilbahar Mawallil	National Government
Froilyn Mendoza	National Government
Michael Midtimbang	National Government
Tawakal Midtimbang	MILF
Abdulkarim Misuari	National Government
Nurredha Misuari	National Government
Rasol Mitmug Jr.	National Government
Alirakim Munder	National Government
Hussein Muñoz	MILF
Suwaib Oranon	MILF
Ubaida Pacasem	MILF
Alindatu Pagayao	MILF
Abdulwahab Pak	MILF
Nabila Pangandaman	National Government
Randolph Parcasio	National Government
Ramon Piang Sr.	MILF
Amer Zaakaria Rakim	National Government
Diamla Ramos	National Government
Said Salendab	MILF
Ali Salik	MILF
Ali Sangki	National Government
Omar Yasser Sema	National Government
Romeo Sema	National Government
Said Shiek	MILF
Aida Silongan	MILF
Naguib Sinarimbo	National Government
Kadil Sinolinding Jr.	MILF
Ali Solaiman	MILF
Amenodin Sumagayan	National Government
Paisalin Tago	National Government
Nabil Tan	National Government
Adzfar Usman	National Government
Bassir Utto	National Government
Sittie Fahanie Uy-Oyod	National Government
Mohammad Yacob	MILF
