= 1st Bangsamoro Transition Authority Parliament =

Interim Parliament in the Philippines

←	9th ARMM Regional Legislative Assembly	2nd Bangsamoro Transition Authority Parliament	→
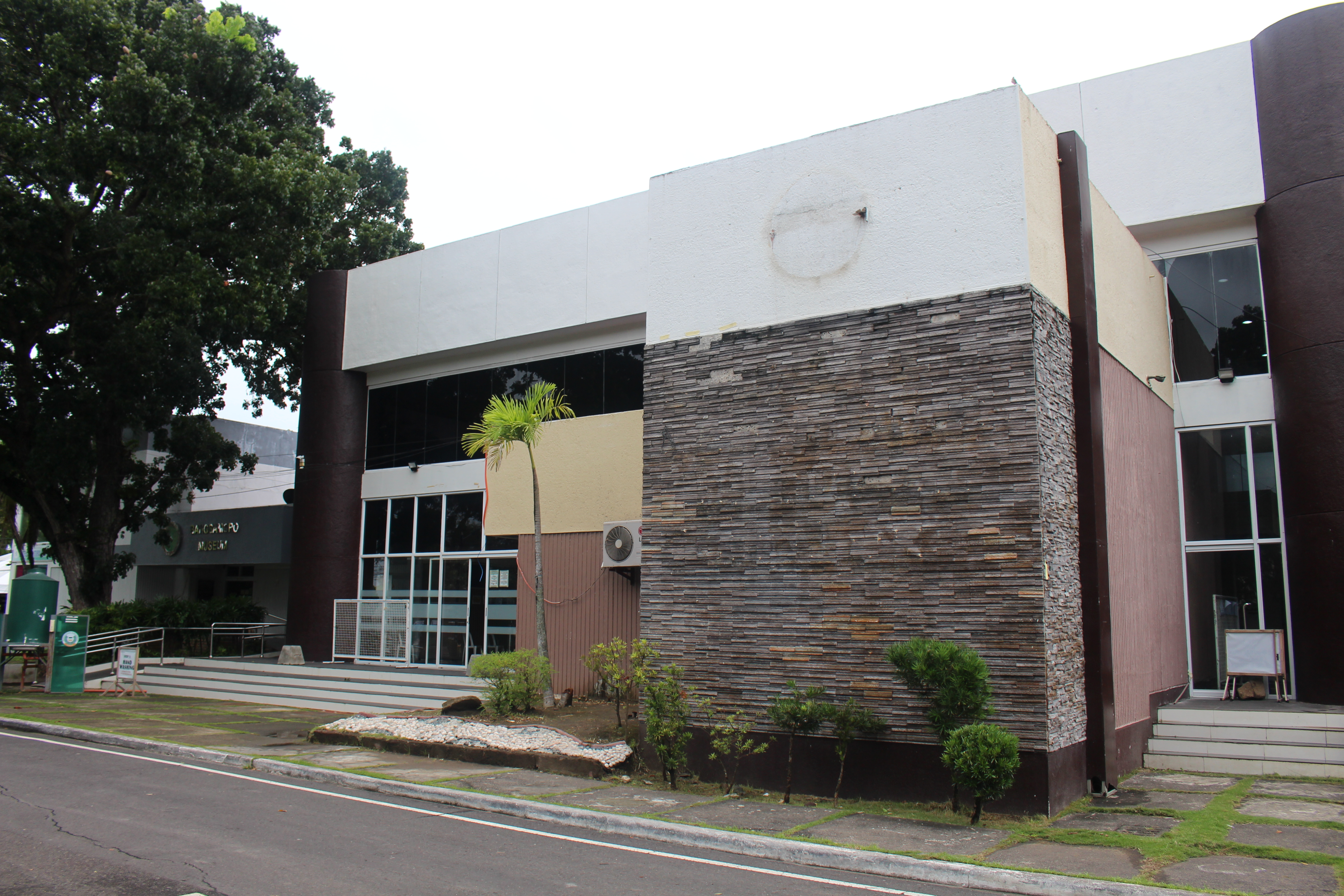
- Shariff Kabunsuan Cultural Complex (2021)

Overview
- Legislative body: Bangsamoro Parliament
- Jurisdiction: Bangsamoro Autonomous Region in Muslim Mindanao, Philippines
- Meeting place: Shariff Kabunsuan Cultural Complex, BARMM Complex, Brgy. Rosary Heights VII, Cotabato City
- Term: March 29, 2019 – September 15, 2022
- Members: 106 (until June 30, 2019); 80 (from June 30, 2019)
- Speaker: Pangalian Balindong
- Deputy Speakers: Hatimil Hassan; Omar Yasser Sema (from November 26, 2020); Zia Alonto Adiong (January 19, 2021 – June 30, 2022); Nabil Tan (from January 19, 2021)
- Majority Leader: Lanang Ali Jr.
- Minority Leader: Laisa Alamia

Sessions
- 1st: March 29, 2019 – April 21, 2020
- 2nd: June 16, 2020 – March 25, 2021
- 3rd: June 15, 2021 – March 24, 2022
- 4th: June 14, 2022 – September 15, 2022

The 1st Bangsamoro Transition Authority (BTA) Parliament is the first interim Bangsamoro Parliament, the legislature of the transitional regional government of Bangsamoro.

It is composed of members of the Bangsamoro Transition Authority which itself was constituted on February 22, 2019, when its first set of members took their oath. The inaugural session began on March 29, 2019 and ended on April 23, 2020. At the start of the first regular session, the parliament had 75 members.

The second regular session began on June 16, 2020. The third session began on June 15, 2021. The fourth session began on June 14, 2022.

The fourth session was abruptly ended when a new set of BTA officials were appointed on August 12, 2022, and the 2nd interim parliament held its inaugural session on September 15, 2022.

== Leadership ==
Speaker

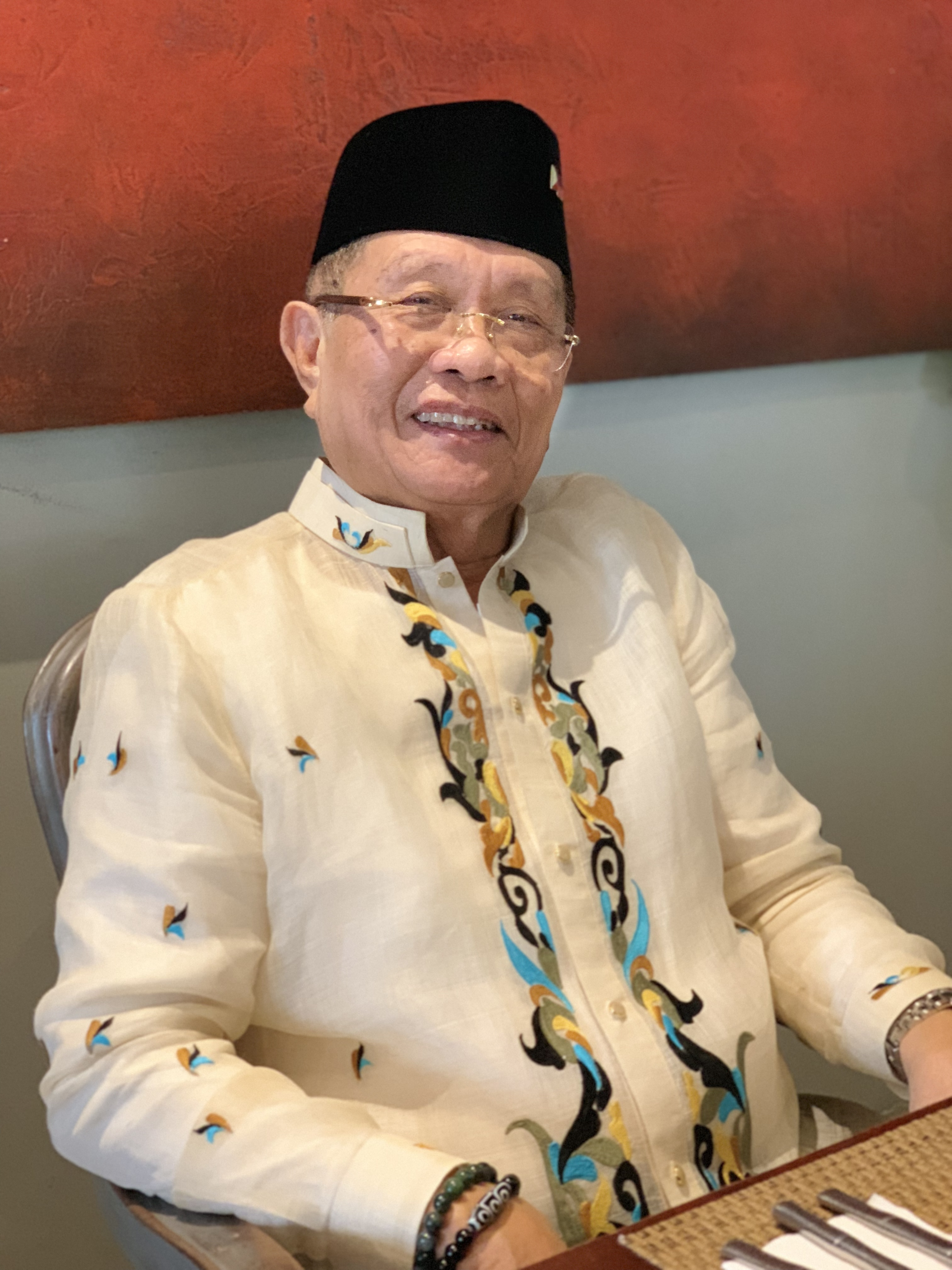
Pangalian Balindong

- Speaker: Pangalian Balindong (MILF)
- Deputy Speakers:
  - Hatimil Hassan (National Government)
  - Omar Yasser Sema (National Government), from November 26, 2020
  - Zia Alonto Adiong (National Government), January 19, 2021 – June 30, 2022
  - Nabil Tan (National Government), from January 19, 2021
- Majority Leader: Lanang Ali Jr. (MILF)
- Minority Leader: Laisa Alamia (National Government)

== Sessions ==
- First Regular Session: March 29, 2019 – April 21, 2020 (Note: The First Regular Session was initially scheduled to end on February 28, 2020.)
- Second Regular Session: June 16, 2020 – March 25, 2021
- Third Regular Session: June 15, 2021 – March 24, 2022
- Fourth Regular Session: June 14, 2022 – September 15, 2022 (Note: The Fourth Regular Session was initially scheduled to end on March 16, 2023.)

== Composition ==
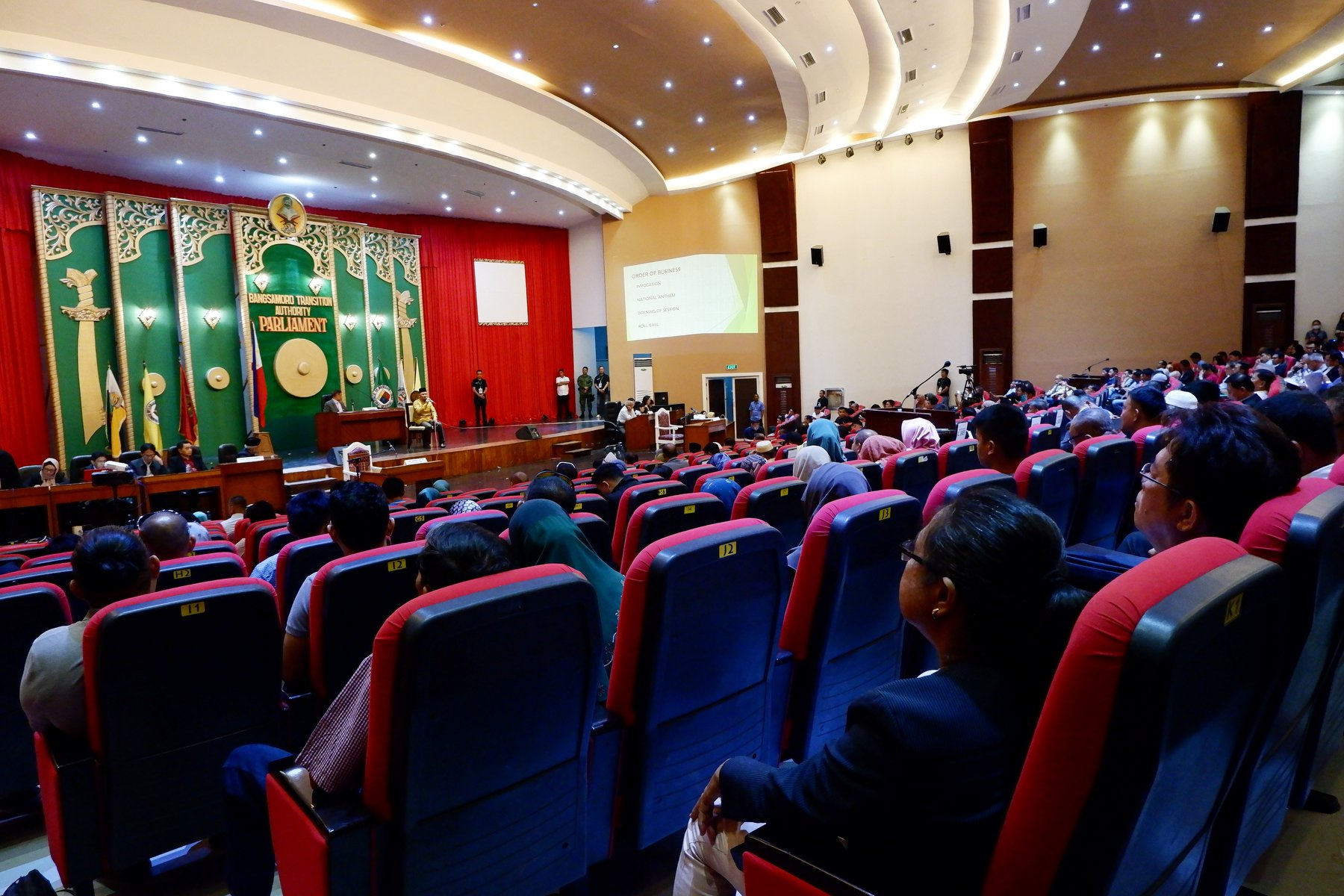
Special session by the Bangsamoro interim parliament, June 2019.

MPs	At start	At end
Moro Islamic Liberation Front nominees	40	38
National Government nominees	35	36
Elected Autonomous Region in Muslim Mindanao officials	0	0
Vacant	31	6
Total	106	80

It is legislated that the Moro Islamic Liberation Front will lead the BTA “without prejudice to the participation of the Moro National Liberation Front (MNLF) in its membership.” Elected officials of the ARMM whose terms were set to end until June 30, 2019, served as part of the body until that date. These officials are the regional governor, the vice governor and the members of the 24-seat Regional Legislative Assembly. Eighty members of the interim body were appointed by the Philippine government, 41 were nominated by the MILF, and the remaining were selected by the national government. Only 76 out of 80 nominees took their oath as BTA members by February 22, 2019.

On the first day of the parliament's first regular session on March 29, 2019, there were 75 regular members, 40 of whom were MILF nominees and 35 national government nominees. BTA member Ghazali Jaafar died prior and the government has not filled in four vacant seats. 23 ARMM elected officials also temporarily served as part of the parliament. ARMM Governor Mujiv Hataman opted out from being part of the BTA, a member of the 24-seat ARMM Regional Legislative Assembly died and another assemblyman, Khadafeh Mangudadatu was nominated as a regular member by the national government. The vice governor and the remaining 22 members of the assembly have not taken their oaths as BTA members.

The interim parliament was originally set to end its mandate in 2022. However the impact of the COVID-19 pandemic in the region has been cited as justification, which led to the non-passage of a Bangsamoro Electoral Code led to lobbying by the Bangsamoro regional government and some advocacy groups for the national government to postpone the elections. In order for the elections to be postponed, the Bangsamoro Organic Law needs to be amended. The campaign was successful after President Rodrigo Duterte signed into law on October 28, 2021, the bill postponing the elections to 2025.

When the law postponing the elections was being deliberated, the possibility of revising the manner of allocation of seats in the interim parliament was raised. In the Senate it was proposed that the provincial governors of Bangsamoro given the power to nominate members in the interim parliament. The law also gave President Duterte to appoint new set of members for the parliament before his term expires in 2022.

In February 2022, the Security, Justice and Peace Cabinet Cluster advised Duterte to retain the existing parliament members which the president approved. Duterte retained the 41 seats allocated to MILF nominees.

The body running the parliament under President Duterte would be informally and retroactively be referred to as "BTA 1".

== Graphical representation ==
These are graphical representations of the Bangsamoro Transition Authority showing a comparison of its composition after the initial set of officers were sworn-in in 2019 and its make-up from June 30, 2019 until the end of the 1st Interim Parliament in 2022: (Note: This is not the official seating plan of the Bangsamoro Parliament.)

Composition from February 22 to June 30, 2019

Final composition

== List of MPs ==
Name	Nominated by
Akmad Abas	MILF
Haron Abas	MILF
Zul Qarneyn Abas	National Government
Basit Abbas	MILF
Mudjib Abu (Note: Mudjib Abu was appointed on May 20, 2020, to replace Ghazali Jaafar.)	MILF
Zia Alonto Adiong (Note: Zia Alonto Adiong was appointed on August 13, 2020. Adiong resigned on June 30, 2022, upon taking office as Member of the House of Representatives for Lanao del Sur's 1st district.)	National Government
Abdullah Ahang	MILF
Laisa Alamia	National Government
Ibrahim Ali	MILF
Lanang Ali Jr.	MILF
Eddie Alih	National Government
Zesar Alil	MILF
Faiz Allaudin	MILF
Suharto Ambolodto	National Government
Baintan Ampatuan	National Government
Susana Anayatin	National Government
Muslima Asmawil	MILF
Pangalian Balindong	MILF
Hamid Barra	National Government
Anna Tarhata Basman	National Government
Mohammad Zainoden Bato (Note: Mohammad Zainoden Bato died on August 15, 2021.)	MILF
Abraham Burahan	National Government
Maleiha Candao	MILF
Abdul Dataya (Note: Abdul Dataya died on July 9, 2019.)	MILF
Musa Diamla	National Government
Zafrullah Dipatuan	MILF
Murad Ebrahim	MILF
Abduladzis Esmael	MILF
Abdullah Gayak	MILF
Eduard Guerra	MILF
Abdullah Biston Hashim (Note: Abdullah Biston Hashim took office on February 11, 2020, to replace Abdul Dataya.)	MILF
Hatimil Hassan	National Government
Mohagher Iqbal	MILF
Rasul Ismael	National Government
Ghazali Jaafar (Note: Ghazali Jaafar died on March 13, 2019.)	MILF
Raissa Jajurie	MILF
Muslimin Jakilan	National Government
Albakil Jikiri (Note: Albakil Jikiri took office on October 14, 2021, to replace Abdul Sahrin.)	National Government
Bainon Karon	MILF
Maisara Latiph	National Government
Mussolini Lidasan	National Government
Don Mustapha Loong	National Government
Jose Iribani Lorena	National Government
Abdulraof Macacua	MILF
Jamel Macaraya	National Government
Marjanie Macasalong	MILF
Abdullah Makapaar	MILF
Khadafeh Mangudadatu (Note: Khadafeh Mangudadatu resigned on June 30, 2022, upon taking office as Mayor of Pandag, Maguindanao.)	National Government
Malik Mantawil	MILF
Sittie Mastura (Note: Sittie Mastura resigned on June 30, 2022, upon taking office as Member of the House of Representatives for Maguindanao's 1st district.)	National Government
Tucao Mastura (Note: Tucao Mastura resigned on June 30, 2022, upon taking office as Mayor of Sultan Kudarat, Maguindanao.)	MILF
Amilbahar Mawallil	National Government
Midpantao Midtimbang	MILF
Rasol Mitmug Jr. (Note: Rasol Mitmug Jr. took office on September 17, 2019.)	National Government
Abdulmuhmin Mujahid	National Government
Hussein Muñoz	MILF
Suwaib Oranon	MILF
Ubaida Pacasem	MILF
Abdulwahab Pak	MILF
Nabila Pangandaman	National Government
Diamila Ramos (Note: Diamila Ramos was appointed on August 13, 2019.)	National Government
Edrieza Nasser Rimbang	National Government
Modayao Sacar	National Government
Abdul Sahrin (Note: Abdul Sahrin died on January 20, 2021.)	National Government
Said Salendab	MILF
Al-Syed Sali (Note: Al-Syed Sali resigned on June 30, 2022, upon taking office as Vice Governor of Tawi-Tawi.)	MILF
Romeo Saliga	National Government
Ali Salik	MILF
Ali Sangki (Note: Ali Sangki took office on January 8, 2020.)	National Government
Punduma Sani	National Government
Alzad Sattar	National Government
Omar Yasser Sema	National Government
Romeo Sema	National Government
Said Shiek	MILF
Aida Silongan	MILF
Ali Solaiman	MILF
Paisalin Tago	National Government
Nabil Tan	National Government
Sahie Udjah	National Government
Melanio Ulama	MILF
Adzfar Usman	National Government
Mohammad Yacob	MILF
Narciso Yu Ekey	MILF

The last governor and the vice governor of the Autonomous Region in Muslim Mindanao (ARMM) as well as members of the 9th ARMM Regional Legislative Assembly were allowed to become part of the BTA until June 30, 2019, which was supposed to be the end of their original elective post.

However, none of the officials, save for one nominated assembly member, took oath as members of the BTA. ARMM Regional Governor Mujiv Hataman opted out from joining the BTA. Vice Governor Haroun Lucman and the remaining 22 members of the 9th Assembly were also not part of the parliament.
