= Floor Leader of the Bangsamoro Parliament =

Political position

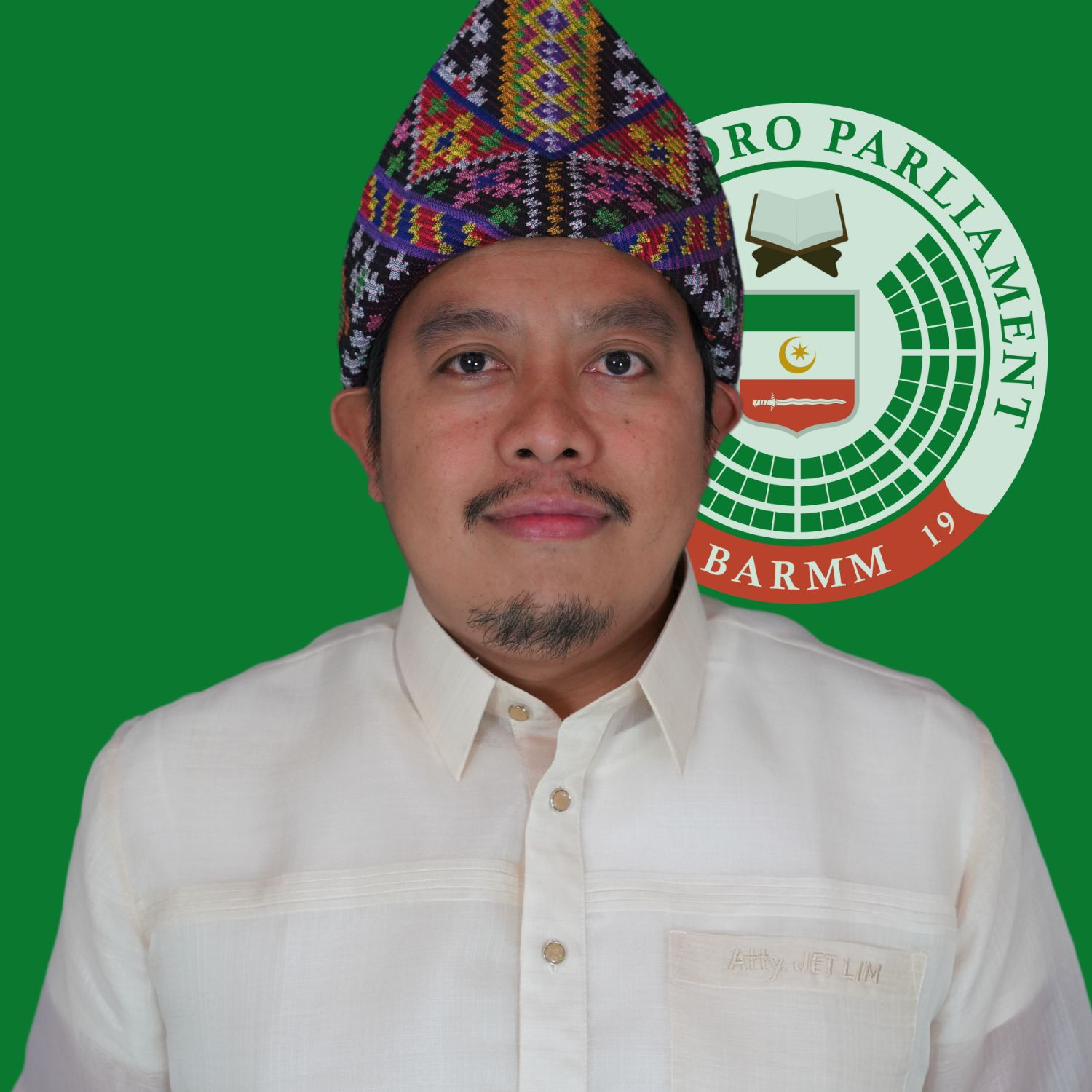
- Incumbent; John Anthony Lim since October 21, 2025
- Style: The Honorable
- Appointer: Bangsamoro Parliament
- Inaugural holder: Lanang Ali Jr. (as majority floor leader)
- Formation: September 20, 2022

The floor leader of the Bangsamoro Parliament is the leader elected by the Bangsamoro Parliament that serves as the official leader of the body at-large since the abolition of the majority and minority blocs in the 2nd Interim Parliament. He manages the business of the chamber. The speaker or any presiding officer gives the floor leader priority in obtaining the floor and is traditionally the chairman of the Committee on Rules.

The current floor leader of the Parliament is John Anthony Lim since October 21, 2025.

== List of floor leaders ==
=== Bangsamoro Transition Authority Parliament (since 2019) ===
Portrait	Name (Birth–Death)	Term of office		Affiliation (Note: Indicates nominating entity) (Note: Members of the 1st and 2nd Bangsamoro Transition Authority Parliament are appointed by the national government of the Philippines, and are formally recognized as nonpartisans.)	Parliament
Portrait	Name (Birth–Death)	Took office	Left office	Affiliation	Parliament
	Lanang Ali Jr. Member of the BTA (born 1982)	March 29, 2019 (Note: As majority floor leader)	September 15, 2022	MILF	1st BTA (Interim) Parliament
	Sha Elijah Dumama-Alba; Member of the BTA (born 1981/1982)	September 15, 2022	September 20, 2022	MILF	2nd BTA (Interim) Parliament
	Sha Elijah Dumama-Alba; Member of the BTA (born 1981/1982)	September 20, 2022	October 21, 2025	MILF	2nd BTA (Interim) Parliament
	John Anthony Lim; Member of the BTA (born 1979)	October 21, 2025	Incumbent	National Government	2nd BTA (Interim) Parliament

== List of former floor leaders ==
=== Bangsamoro Transition Authority Parliament (since 2019) ===
==== Minority floor leaders ====
Portrait	Name (Birth–Death)	Term of office		Affiliation	Parliament
Portrait	Name (Birth–Death)	Took office	Left office	Affiliation	Parliament
	Laisa Alamia; Member of the BTA (born 1971/1972)	March 29, 2019	September 15, 2022	National Government	1st BTA (Interim) Parliament
Position abolished (since September 15, 2022)
