= Ghazali Jaafar =

Filipino militant and government official (1944–2019)

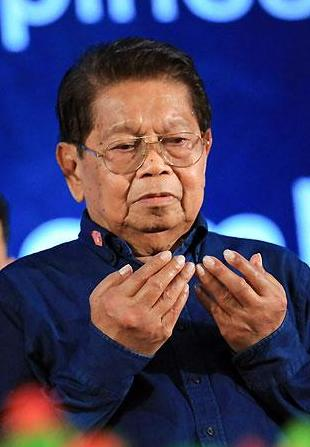
- Jaafar in November 2017

Member of the Bangsamoro Transition Authority
- In office February 22, 2019 – March 13, 2019
- Nominated by: Moro Islamic Liberation Front
- Appointed by: Rodrigo Duterte
- Preceded by: position and office created
- Succeeded by: Mudjib Abu

Chairman of the Bangsamoro Transition Commission
- In office February 10, 2017 – February 22, 2019
- President: Rodrigo Duterte
- Preceded by: Mohagher Iqbal
- Succeeded by: position and office abolished

Personal details
- Born: May 6, 1944 Cotabato City, Philippines
- Died: March 13, 2019 (aged 74) Davao City, Philippines
- Education: Notre Dame College

Hajji Salik B. Abu more commonly known as Ghazali Jaafar (6 May 1944 – 13 March 2019) was a Filipino militant and government official. He fought under the Moro Islamic Liberation Front (MILF). He served as chairman of the Bangsamoro Transition Commission (BTC), and the Speaker of the Parliament designate under the Bangsamoro Transition Authority (BTA), the interim regional government of the Bangsamoro Autonomous Region in Muslim Mindanao.

== Early life ==
Jaafar was born on May 6, 1944. While in high school, Jaafar established a youth group that encouraged activism among students and out-of-school youth in Cotabato City. He pursued a course in political science at Notre Dame College with an intention to become a lawyer, but stopped studies to join the Moro armed struggle against the government.

== Career ==
=== Militant ===
Jaafar was a member of the Moro Islamic Liberation Front (MILF) that initially campaigned for an independent state in Mindanao, but later pursued autonomy for Bangsamoro region. He was the group's Vice Chair.

Jaafar led MILF's dialogue with the national government, serving as the first chairman of the group's negotiating panel from 1996 to 1997. He signed the general cessation of hostilities in Cagayan de Oro on July 18, 1997. The MILF signed a peace agreement with the national government in 2014 under the administration of then-President Benigno Aquino III.

=== Bangsamoro transition ===
Under the administration of President Rodrigo Duterte, Jaafar led the BTC, a body tasked to aid in the creation of a draft of the Bangsamoro Organic Law.

He was named into the BTA and made his last public appearance in February 2019 when he and other members of the transition body were sworn in. He was later designated to serve as the Speaker of the Bangsamoro Parliament.

== Illness and death ==
Months prior to his death on March 13, 2019, Jaafar was experiencing an internal illness. In 2018, he was rushed a hospital in Metro Manila due to a heart problem. His last three days were at the Metro Davao Medical and Research Center in Davao City. He died due to kidney failure.
