= Raissa Jajurie =

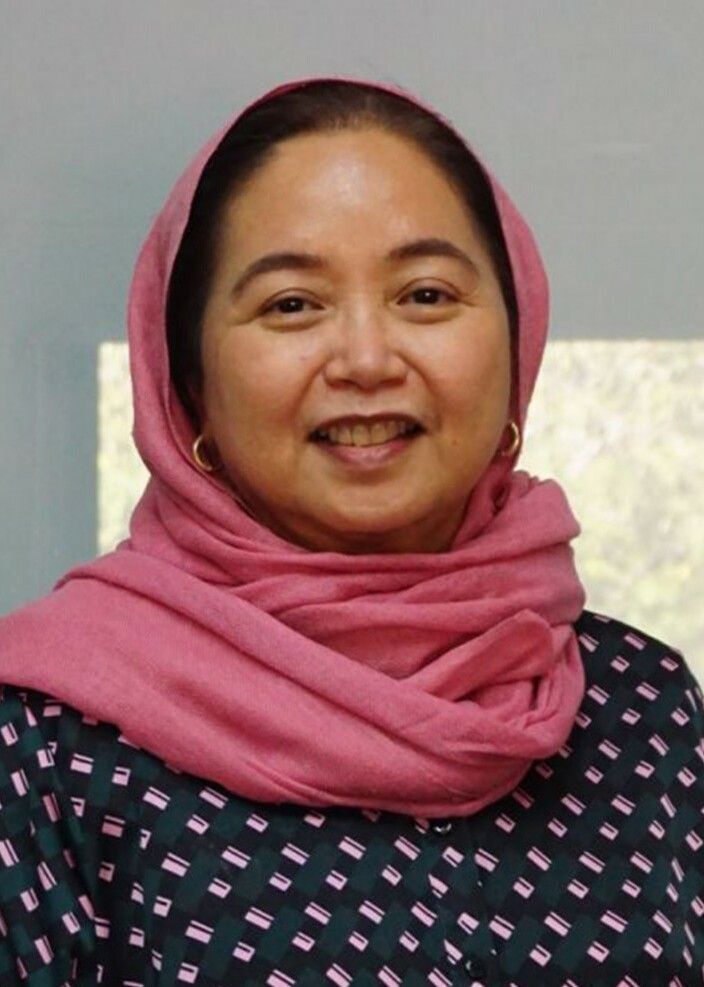

Member of the Bangsamoro Parliament
- Incumbent
- Assumed office October 30, 2026

Member of the Bangsamoro Transition Authority Parliament
- In office March 29, 2019 – October 30, 2026
- Nominated by: Moro Islamic Liberation Front
- Appointed by: Rodrigo Duterte
- Chief Minister: Murad Ebrahim
- Succeeded by: Office disestablished
Ministerial offices
Minister of Social Services and Development
Incumbent
Assumed office February 26, 2019
Chief Minister	Murad Ebrahim (2019–2025); Abdulraof Macacua (2025–present)
Preceded by	Office established
Succeeded by

Personal details
- Born: March 30, 1967 (age 59)
- Party: UBJP
- Profession: Lawyer

Raissa Herradura Jajurie is a Moro Filipino lawyer and human rights activist who is a member of the Bangsamoro Parliament. She also heads the Ministry of Social Services and Development of Bangsamoro.

== Education ==
Born in Sulu, Raissa Herradura Jajurie attended the Ateneo de Manila University where she graduated with a degree in political science. She finished her studies in law at the University of the Philippines College of Law.

== Career ==
Jajurie would be part of the Sentro ng Alternatibong Lingap Panligal (SALIGAN), alternative law group fulfilling various roles within the organization and would found the Nisa Ul-Haqq fi Bangsamoro (Women for Justice in the Bangsamoro).

Jajurie was also a legal consultant for the Moro Islamic Liberation Front (MILF). She worked with the rebel group during its peace process negotiations with the national government of the Philippines during the administration of President Benigno Aquino III. She was also part of the Bangsamoro Transition Commission from 2013 to 2019 that was tasked to create a draft for the law that would become the Bangsamoro Organic Law.

Upon the creation of the Bangsamoro autonomous region in 2019, Jajurie was named part of the first Bangsamoro Transition Authority which served as the interim Bangsamoro Parliament.
