= Bangsamoro Transition Commission =

- Seal
- Abbreviation: BTC
- Formation: December 17, 2013
- Dissolved: February 22, 2019
- Location: Cotabato City, Philippines
- Chairman: Mohagher Iqbal (2014–2018); Ghazali Jaafar (2018–2019)
- Website: http://www.bangsamoroonline.com/

The Bangsamoro Transition Commission (BTC) was a government body that was tasked to aid in creating the draft of the Bangsamoro Organic Law as well as the transition body in the areas to form the Bangsamoro Autonomous Region in Muslim Mindanao until the constitution of the Bangsamoro Transition Authority and formal creation of the autonomous region.

== Background ==
The Bangsamoro Transition Commission is a government body created on December 17, 2013 by the virtue of Executive Order 120 signed by President Benigno Aquino III. The commission is tasked to come up with a draft on the Bangsamoro Basic Law (BBL), which would serve as the basis of a new Bangsamoro political entity, in accordance to the Framework Agreement on the Bangsamoro. Under the executive order, the Bangsamoro Transition Commission was to be disestablished upon the enactment of a Bangsamoro Basic Law. The Bangsamoro Basic Law failed to pass during the Aquino administration.

Under Aquino's successor, President Rodrigo Duterte amended Executive Order 120 issued by his predecessor through Executive Order No. 8 in 2016 which includes increasing the membership of the BTC.

The BBL was later passed into law as the Bangsamoro Organic Law (BOL) in 2018 and was ratified through a plebiscite on January 21, 2019. The BTC was to be disestablished upon ratification according to relevant executive orders but continued as a transition body of the new Bangsamoro Autonomous Region by the virtue of Section 5 of Article XVI of the BOL until the constitution of the Bangsamoro Transition Authority.

== Composition ==
=== Under the second Aquino administration ===
The former commission under the administration of President Benigno Aquino III is composed of 15 members. 8 members including the chairman where chosen by the Moro Islamic Liberation Front while 7 members where chosen by the government. The composition seeks to represent the Christian, Muslim and Indigenous People (IP) communities.

- Ibrahim Ali
- Maulana Alonto
- Talib Abdulhamid Benito
- Abdulla Camlian
- Pedrito Eisma
- Raissa Jajurie
- Mohagher Iqbal (chair)
- Froilyn Mendoza
- Hussein Munoz
- Akmad Sakkam
- Fatmawati Salapuddin
- Said Shiek
- Asani Tammang
- Timuay Melanio Ulama
- Johaira Wahab

=== Under the Duterte administration ===
==== Pre-BOL ratification ====
The current composition under President Rodrigo Duterte is composed of 21 members, with an additional 6 more members from 15 in the past administration. It is composed of the Moro Islamic Liberation Front with 11 members and 3 members from the Moro National Liberation Front – Sema Group. There are also representatives from the Christian and Indigenous People (IP) communities.

- Jose Lorena
- Maisara Dandamun-Latiph
- Datu Mussolini Sinsuat Lidasan
- Dr. Susana Salvador-Anayatin
- Hussin Amin
- Romeo Saliga
- Hatimil Hassan
- Samira Gutoc-Tomawis*
- Firdausi Ismail Abas
- Omar Yasser Sema
- Ghazali Jaafar (chair)
- Mohagher Iqbal
- Abdulraof Macacua
- Ibrahim Ali
- Haron Abas
- Raissa Jajurie
- Said Shiek
- Hussein Muñoz
- Melanio Ulama
- Gafur Kanain
- Ammal Solaiman

* Samira Gutoc-Tomawis resigned from her post during Marawi siege.

=== Post-BOL ratification ===
As per Section 5 of Article XVI of the Bangsamoro Organic Law (BOL), a caretaker body is to aid the transition process of the ARMM to the BARMM consisting of members of the BTC and the 25 elected members of the ARMM consisting of the incumbent Regional Governor, Vice Governor and 23 members of the Regional Legislative Assembly at the ratification of the BOL. This body will exist until the formation of the Bangsamoro Transition Authority (BTA), which will consist of 80 presidential nominees and (until the expiration of their terms on June 30, 2019), the 25 elected officials of the former ARMM.

The BTC served as caretaker of the Bangsamoro Autonomous Region upon the region's nominal establishment. The BTA was constituted on February 22, 2019 with the oath taking of its members effectively abolishing the commission.

Now technically defunct, the BTC made a turnover its interim administration of the Bangsamoro region to the Bangsamoro Transition Authority on February 26, 2019.
