= Salapuddin =

Salapuddin is a surname. Notable people with the surname include:

- Abdulgani Salapuddin (born 1952), Filipino politician
- Fatmawati Salapuddin, Filipino politician
