= Aida Silongan =

Filipino politician

Member of the Bangsamoro Parliament for the Women's Sector
- Incumbent
- Assumed office October 30, 2026
- Chief Minister: Abdulraof Macacua
- Preceded by: Office established

Member of the Bangsamoro Transition Authority Parliament
- In office 2019–2025
- Nominated by: Moro Islamic Liberation Front
- Appointed by: Rodrigo Duterte
- Chief Minister: Murad Ebrahim

Minister of Science and Technology of the Bangsamoro
- In office 2019 – May 27, 2025
- Preceded by: Office established
- Succeeded by: Jehan Usop (acting)

Personal details
- Party: United Bangsamoro Justice Party

Aida Macalimpas Silongan is a Filipino engineer, women's rights activist and politician.

== Early years ==
=== Engineering and construction career ===
Silongan also held various positions in the Philippine government. She served as Assistant Municipal Planning and Development Coordinator of Matalam, Cotabato, in 1986 and from 1987 to 1992. She later worked as an engineer for the National Irrigation Administration's Alip River Irrigation Project. She subsequently became Project Manager of Ri-ann Construction and Supply in Kabacan before serving as the managing officer and proprietress of Ash Construction and Supply.

=== MILF and civic work ===
She later joined the then separatist rebel group, Moro Islamic Liberation Front (MILF) as a volunteer to of their social welfare committee.

She was the first woman member of the board of directors of Bangsamoro Development Agency and the convenor of the Women's Organization Movement of Bangsamoro. She co-founded the non-government organization Al-Amanah Humanitarian Development Services to cater to marginalized groups of the Bangsamoro region, especially women and children.

== Political career ==
=== Bangsamoro Transition Authority Parliament (2019–2025) ===
After the Bangsamoro autonomous region was established in 2019, Silongan became part of the MILF-led regional government. She was among the first set of members of appointed to the Bangsamoro Transition Authority Parliament in February 2019. Silongan was a nominee of the MILF; the other major group was the nominees of the Philippine national government. The Bangsamoro Parliament held its inaugural session on 29 March 2019 in Cotabato City.

She served as a member of the 1st and 2nd interim meetings of the Bangsamoro Parliament. Her tenure ended on March 15, 2025, when President Bongbong Marcos reorganized the parliament and appointed a new set of members.

==== Ministry of Science and Technology ====
Silongan was named to head the Ministry of Science and Technology and currently held the science ministry role while acting as a member of parliament. In May 27, 2025, Jehan Usop took over the portfolio under an acting capacity.

=== Bangsamoro Parliament (2026–) ===
Aida Silongan ran under the United Bangsamoro Justice Party (UBJP) of the MILF for the women's sectoral seat in the 2026 Bangsamoro Parliament election on September 14, 2026. She is poised to return to the regional legislature after she was proclaimed as the winner by the Commission on Elections.

== Personal life ==
Aida Macalimpas Silongan is from Matalam, Cotabato. She is a holder of civil engineering degree. She is a Maguindanaon.
