= Mohammad Zainoden Bato =

Moro revolutionary and politician (died 2021)

Member of the Bangsamoro Transition Authority Parliament
- In office March 29, 2019 – August 15, 2021
- Nominated by: Moro Islamic Liberation Front
- Appointed by: Rodrigo Duterte
- Chief Minister: Murad Ebrahim

Personal details
- Born: 1944 or 1945
- Died: August 15, 2021 (aged 76)
- Citizenship: Filipino
- Education: Al-Azhar University
- Known for: Co-founder of MILF
- Military career
- Allegiance: MILF
- Conflicts: Moro conflict

Mohammad Zainoden Panganting Bato was a Moro revolutionary and politician. He was a member of the Moro Islamic Liberation Front (MILF) and the Interim Bangsamoro Parliament.

A native of Piagapo, Lanao del Sur and educated at the Al-Azhar University in Cairo, Egypt, Bato was among the founding members of the Moro Islamic Liberation Front (MILF) in the 1960s. He became the head of the group's central committee and its Mujlis as-Shura or consultative council.

After the establishment of the Bangsamoro autonomous region in 2019, he became part of the Interim Bangsamoro Parliament as one of the 41 nominees of the MILF. He co-authored at least 13 legislative bills and was part of five committees.

He died in office on August 15, 2021, at age 76.
