= Abdulkarim Misuari =

Filipino politician

Ustadz Abdulkarim Misuari
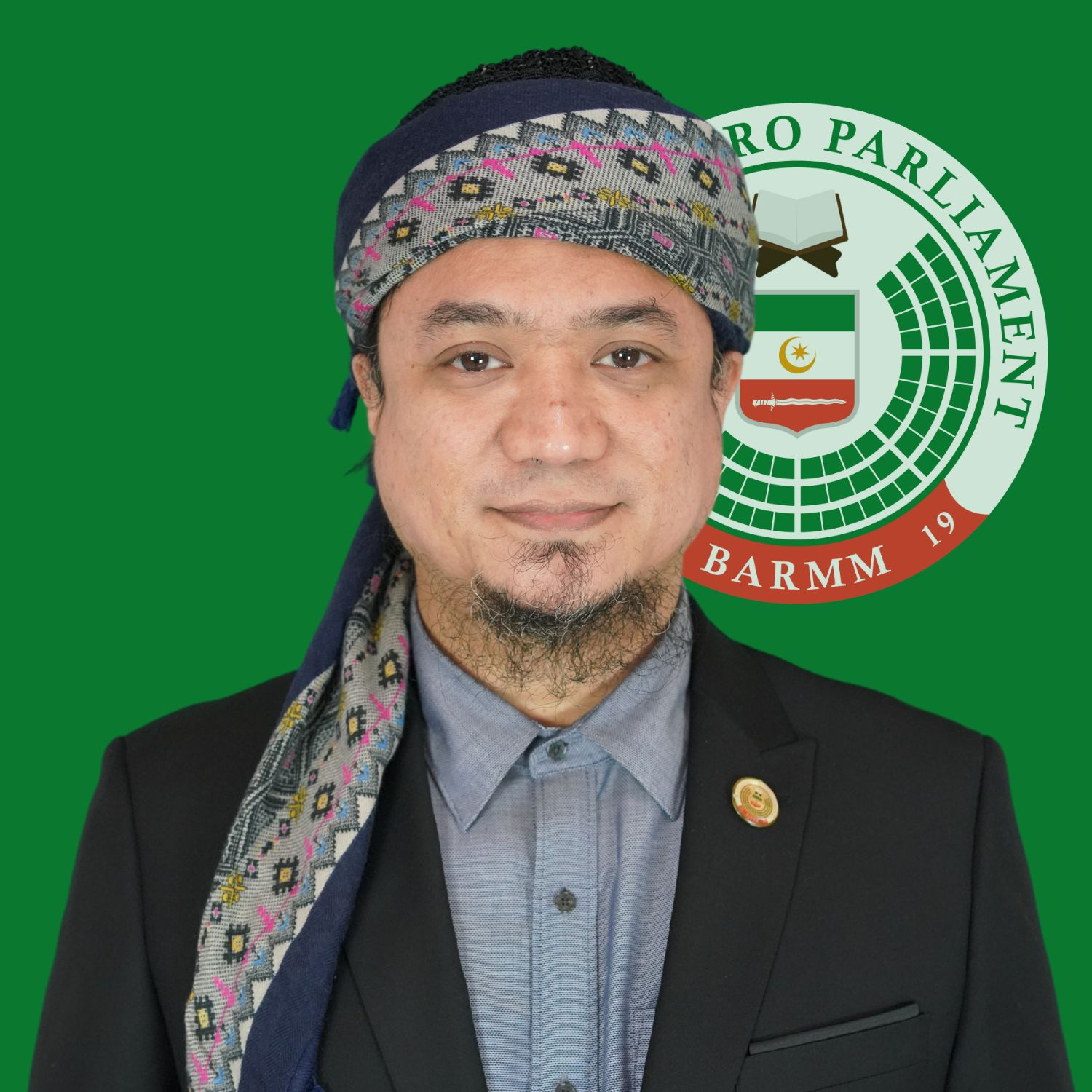

Member of the Bangsamoro Transition Authority Parliament
- Incumbent
- Assumed office September 15, 2022
- Nominated by: Philippine national government
- Appointed by: Bongbong Marcos
- Chief Minister: Murad Ebrahim

Personal details
- Born: December 1974 (age 51) Malaysia
- Party: Mahardika
- Parent(s): Nur Misuari; Desdemona Tan

Ustadz Abdulkarim "Kharz" Tan Misuari is a Moro Filipino who is a member of the Bangsamoro Transition Authority Parliament.

== Early life ==
He is the eldest son of six children of Moro National Liberation Front (MNLF) founder Nur Misuari and Desdemona Tan of Sulu. Kharz Misuari was born in December 1974 in Malaysia on the first year of his parents' life in exile which would last for at least two decades. He would spend his life outside the Philippines; in Libya, Egypt, Pakistan, Saudi Arabia and Syria.

== Career ==
=== Moro National Liberation Front ===
Misuari served as Vice Chair of the MNLF under the leadership of his father. He initially trained as a commander to fight for the MNLF but became an ustad instead following the wish of his mother. He also served as chief liaison officer in the Gulf States for the MNLF.

=== Bangsamoro government ===
Misuari along with his half-sister Nurredha Ibrahim Misuari was appointed to the Bangsamoro Transition Authority Parliament by President Bongbong Marcos on August 12, 2022.
