= Kauswagan =

Municipality in Lanao del Norte, Philippines

- Municipality
- Municipality of Kauswagan
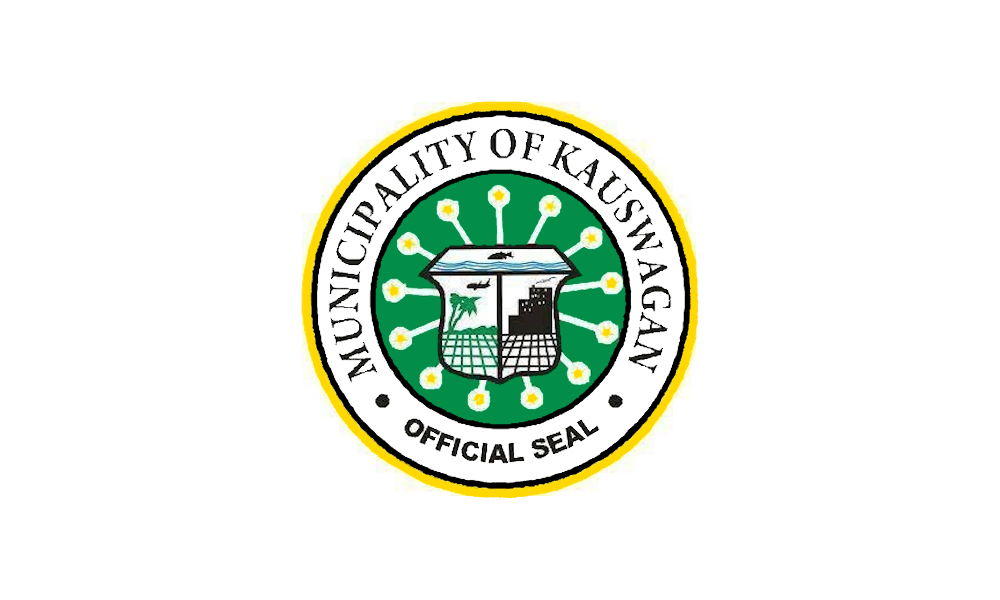
- Flag Seal
- Anthem: "Salomang Kauswaganon"
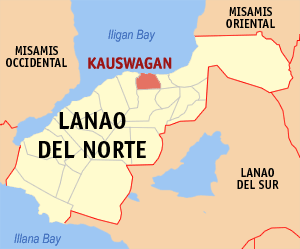
- Map of Lanao del Norte with Kauswagan highlighted
- Interactive map of Kauswagan
- Location within the Philippines
- Coordinates: 8°11′30″N 124°05′05″E
- Country: Philippines
- Region: Northern Mindanao
- Province: Lanao del Norte
- District: 1st district
- Founded: August 1, 1948
- Barangays: 13 (see Barangays)

Government
  - Type: Sangguniang Bayan
  - Mayor: Rommel C. Arnado
  - Vice Mayor: Dr. Maximo C. Arnado
  - Representative: Mohamad Khalid Q. Dimaporo
  - Municipal Council: Members: Aga S. Dimakuta; Sultan Camlon T. Moner; Malic O. Macabato; Abdul Wahid Mananggolo; Leah O. Bandejon; Alde O. Tan; Nazar V. Roble; Desiderio N. Ayuno
  - Electorate: 14,940 voters (2025)

Area
  - Total: 60.37 km^{2} (23.31 sq mi)
- Elevation: 57 m (187 ft)
- Highest elevation: 242 m (794 ft)
- Lowest elevation: 0 m (0 ft)

Population (2024 census)
  - Total: 25,515
  - Density: 422.6/km^{2} (1,095/sq mi)
  - Households: 5,665

Economy
  - Income class: 1st municipal income class
  - Poverty incidence: 34.09% (2023)
  - Revenue: ₱ 377.1 million (2024)
  - Assets: ₱ 1,576 million (2024)
  - Expenditure: ₱ 266.9 million (2024)
  - Liabilities: ₱ 737.5 million (2024)

Service provider
  - Electricity: Lanao del Norte Electric Cooperative (LANECO)
- Time zone: UTC+8 (PST)
- ZIP code: 9202
- PSGC: 1003507000
- IDD : area code: +63 (0)63
- Native languages: Maranao; Cebuano; Binukid; Tagalog
- Website: kauswagan.net

Kauswagan, officially the Municipality of Kauswagan (Maranao: Inged a Kauswagan, Cebuano: Lungsod sa Kauswagan, Tagalog: Bayan ng Kauswagan), is a municipality in the province of Lanao del Norte, Philippines. According to the 2024 census, it has a population of 25,515 people.

== History ==
Kauswagan was organized into a municipality through President Manuel Roxas's Executive Order No. 126, s. 1948 which separated the barrio of Kauswagan and the sitios of Linamon, Magoong, Purakan, Rebukon, Samburun, Lapayan, Takub and Kawit from the then municipality of Iligan.

Kauswagan was one of the municipalities that suffered in Lanao del Norte during the martial law and Ilaga war against the Moro. In March 2000, then-President Joseph Estrada declared all-out-war against MILF when it was led by Abdullah Macapaar "Commander Bravo" bin Sabbar fought the Philippine Army.

=== Settlement ===
Initially and before Spain Invasion and later American invasion, most people living in Kauswagan are Maranao Tribe. A folk story from the elders said that during Spain's occupation, some of the leaders from the interior areas of Lanao del Norte usually crossed the beaches of now the Municipality of Kolambugan to the beaches of now Ozamiz City. By boat, they captured some of the people living on the other side of the sea and enslaved most of these captured people; these people were called Bisaya in Maranaw.

In extended living and social process and sometimes in 1935 – 1944, under the National Land Settlement Administration (NLSA), During the Commonwealth Government, there was a House Representatives proposal to take land from the Island of Mindanao to use for settlement to help the Commonwealth Government, but in opposition of Congressman Datu Salipada Khalid Pendatun; The proposal was approved and signed by President Manuel L. Quezon.

The settlers are composed of different people from the Islands of the Visayas and Island Luzon that have knowledge and experience of agriculture, technical, farming, lumber, carpenter, and other skills necessary for settlement. The first settlers settled in Areas:

- Some parts of Zamboanga
- Misamis Occidental
- Lanao del Norte
- Misamis Oriental
- Some part of Surigao
- Some part of Davao
- Some Part of Cotabato

In Lanao del Norte, the transport of settlers was peacefully successful due to the smooth negotiations with the Maranao Tribal Leaders and Land Lords. As a Welcome sign, the Landlords had donated a piece of their land (The piece of land being more than 5 hectares) to start the settlers' life as the beginning of living in the area. In the long run and process, the family of settler works to the landowners, and as a gift, since they are excellent workers, the landlord gave the small piece of their land. Some say that settlers traded and made the business to the landlord just a few item exchange of lands. Some landlords marry their workers' daughters, which results in the majority living in Lanao del Norte and Misamis Occidental having the blood of Maranao Tribe (Muslim Blood).

On the other hand, the settlement has been a problem, and conflict between non-Muslims and Muslims continues even until the implementation of martial law.

=== "Barracudas" Occupation of Kauswagan ===
During martial law and Ilaga group against Moro "Maranao Tribe" in Lanao del Norte. The Ilaga Group had ambushed the Passenger Jeep (Francisco Motors), where the most prominent older families in Barangay Delabayan, including the mother (Bae Iba) of Commander Tagoranao, were massacred.

In the aftermath of being ambushed, the "Bae Iba" was still breathing and could still talk, and she said to some of the Ilaga group when they approached the Jeep, she would report to them what they did to his Son Commander Tagoranao. However, instead, the group leaves the four trigger men return to her and fire (1 magazine) in one direction to her, which results in the body of "Bae Iba" lying in blood.

There was a negotiation between the Mayor of Kauswagan and Commander Tagoranao not to put himself to Justice but instead to submit and surrender the four trigger men to "Barracuda" Lanao del Norte. Shariah Law has confirmed death for the four suspects and commanded by Commander Tagoranao was executed. However, one of them did not execute instead of cutting the two legs and freed because he used his two legs to step forward to Jeep and as a message to the Ilaga group.

After the dropped of Sharia Law for the four trigger men, Commander Tagoranao had received the order from Late Aleem Aziz Mimbantas ("Barracudas" Lanao del Norte and Lanao del Sur Commander) to lead the (200) "Barracudas" selected militants.

And then, he was ordered to invade and massacre all the Ilaga group members living in Kauswagan, Lanao del Norte. During the Invasion, most civilians died in the sea because they did not know how to swim, and some died because of the sunk boat overloaded.

During the "Barracudas" invasion, the "Barracudas" controlled the key locations of Kauswagan and held the Municipal Hall in four hours in order to demand the Mayor for Justice of all Moro victims who had been killed. Places Held:

- Bagumbayan (Poblacion)
- Kawit Occidental
- Kawit Oriental
- Libertad
- Poblacion
- Tacub
- Tugar

To avenged the massacre of Ilaga members and Christian civilians in Kauswagan, Ilaga from different parts of Lanao del Norte raided the Maranaos living in Bacolod, Baroy, Kapatagan, Kolambugan, Maigo, Tubod and Sapad resulting the deaths of hundreds of Maranao people and hundreds of houses razed.

== Geography ==
=== Barangays ===
Kauswagan is politically subdivided into 13 barangays and 1 sitio. Each barangay and sitio consists of puroks.

- Poblacion (including Guiwanon)
- Bagumbayan (including sitio Dalicanan)
- Tacub (from the word "Taklub" pronounced by Maranaos as "Takob" meaning cover/cap from which is based on "Takob sa Kawa"; A Cauldron's Cover)
- Kawit Occidental (West Kawit)
- Kawit Oriental (East Kawit) (from the word "Kawit" which means a bamboo tuba container with a hook on top, ultimately from "Kaw-it"; Hook)
- **Upper Tugar
- **Lower Tugar (endonym; Bandol)
- Baraason
- Cayontor
- Delabayan
- Inudaran
- Libertad (endonym; Lapayan)
- Paiton
- Tingin-Tingin

*Six of the 13 Barangays of Kauswagan are populated by the Maranao Ethnicity in Baraason, Cayontor, Delabayan, Inudaran, Paiton and Tingin-Tingin.

** Tugar is considered as one Barangay

=== Climate ===
Climate data for Kauswagan, Lanao del Norte
Month	Jan	Feb	Mar	Apr	May	Jun	Jul	Aug	Sep	Oct	Nov	Dec	Year
Mean daily maximum °C (°F)	29 (84)	29 (84)	30 (86)	31 (88)	30 (86)	30 (86)	30 (86)	30 (86)	30 (86)	30 (86)	30 (86)	29 (84)	30 (86)
Mean daily minimum °C (°F)	24 (75)	24 (75)	24 (75)	25 (77)	26 (79)	26 (79)	25 (77)	25 (77)	25 (77)	25 (77)	25 (77)	25 (77)	25 (77)
Average precipitation mm (inches)	159 (6.3)	143 (5.6)	166 (6.5)	183 (7.2)	357 (14.1)	414 (16.3)	333 (13.1)	309 (12.2)	289 (11.4)	285 (11.2)	253 (10.0)	166 (6.5)	3,057 (120.4)
Average rainy days	18.4	17.2	20.6	23.4	29.3	29.2	29.9	29.4	27.7	28.7	25.5	19.9	299.2
Source: Meteoblue

== Demographics ==
Population census of Kauswagan
Year	Pop.	±% p.a.
1948	11,095	—
1960	12,636	+1.09%
1970	12,316	−0.26%
1975	9,556	−4.96%
1980	13,875	+7.74%
1990	16,961	+2.03%
1995	18,349	+1.48%
2000	15,364	−3.73%
2007	23,087	+5.78%
2010	24,006	+1.43%
2015	26,278	+1.74%
2020	24,193	−1.72%
2024	25,515	+1.29%
Source: Philippine Statistics Authority

=== Language ===
The lingua franca/common language of this town is Bisaya, specifically the Cebuano language, while Tagalog is used in rare occasions. Cebuano and Maranao commonly used in households.

== Economy ==
Poverty incidence of Kauswagan (%)

Source: Philippine Statistics Authority

Kauswagan is known as the coconut industry center of the interior Lanao del Norte. It also produce fishing, rice, corn and other vegetables.

In 2019, the Kauswagan Power Plant, a 552-megawatt coal-fired power plant, opened. It was built in 5 years. The power plant is owned by GNPower Kauswagan, a joint venture between Ayala Corporation and Power Partners Ltd. The plant provides power to Lanao del Norte.

== Transportation ==
=== Transport Terminals ===
- Kauswagan Integrated Public Terminal

=== Seaport ===
The former port of Kauswagan is located along the northern central coastal area facing Iligan Bay, is now turned into a tourist spot.

=== Public transportation ===
The public modes of transportation within the town are motorcycles, tricycles, and recently introduced modern tricycles or colloquially called in town as "baja" and "racal".

== Government ==
=== Elected officials ===
Members of the Kauswagan Municipal council (2025–2028):

- Municipal Mayor: Hon. Sonia A. Arnado
- Vice Mayor: Hon. Rommel C. Arnado
- SB Secretary: Marjune C. Carballo
- SB Member: Hon. Leah Q. Bandejon
- SB Member: Hon. Maximo C. Arnado Jr.
- SB Member: Hon. Leah S. Tan
- SB Member: Hon. Jurdine Kit M. Asencion
- SB Member: Hon. Cairoding D. Ungca
- SB Member: Hon. Alikhan P. Asum
- SB Member: Hon. Nazar V. Roble
- SB Member: Hon. Abdul Wahid Mananggolo
- ABC President: Hon. Coco Mananggulo
- SK Federated President: Hon. Warren Albert B. Tabanao

=== List of mayors ===
- Mr. Jose Q. Balazo: April 25, 1948, to March 1950 (appointed first mayor of Kauswagan)
- Mr. Santiago Ramirez: March 1950 to April 20, 1950
- Capt. Joseph T. Sanguila Sr.: May 1950 to August 1951
- Mr. Vicctoriano Rafols: September 1951 to December 31, 1951
- Capt. Joseph T. Sanguila Sr.: January 1952 to 1955
- Mr. Teodulfo D. Maslog Sr.: January 1956 to 1959
- Capt. Joseph T. Sanguila Sr.: January 1960 to 1963
- Dr. Maximo P. Arnado Sr.: February 15, 1979, to April 15, 1986
- Maj. Valentine E. Tarroza Sr.: May 1974 to February 12, 1979
- Dr. Maximo P. Arnado Sr.: February 15, 1979 to April 15, 1986
- Atty. Myron B. Rico: April 15, 1986, to December 1, 1987
- Mr. Joseph M. Sanguila Jr.: December 2, 1987, to Jan 3, 1988
- Mr. Pantaleon T. Hontiveros Sr. | January 4, 1988, to February 10, 1988
- Atty. Myron B. Rico: February 11, 1988, to June 1998
- Hon. Mohammad Moamar Jack S. Maruhom: July 1, 1998, to May 11, 2007
- Hon. Yasser Hadji Hasan Samporna: June 30, 2007, to June 30, 2010
- Hon. Rommel C. Arnado: July 1, 2010, to June 30, 2025
- Hon. Sonia A. Arnado (incumbent, May 1, 2025)

== Education ==
=== Elementary schools ===
- Kauswagan Central Elementary School (public)
- Tacub Elementary School (public)
- Jose Balazo Memorial Elementary School (public)
- Libertad Elementary School (public)
- Kawit Occidental Elementary School (public)
- Tingin-Tingin Elementary School (public)
- Paiton Primary School (public)
- Baraason Integrated School (public)
- Cayontor Primary School (public)
- Upper Tugar Elementary School (public)

=== High schools ===
- St. Vincent's Academy (private, sect.)
- Marcela T. Mabanta National High School (public)
- Doña Laureana Rosales School for Practical Organic Agriculture (senior high school)

=== Integrated schools ===
- Sultan Dimasangcay Mananggolo Integrated School (Delabayan Elementary School) (public)
- Kawit Oriental Integrated School of Fisheries (public)
