= Abdullah Hashim =

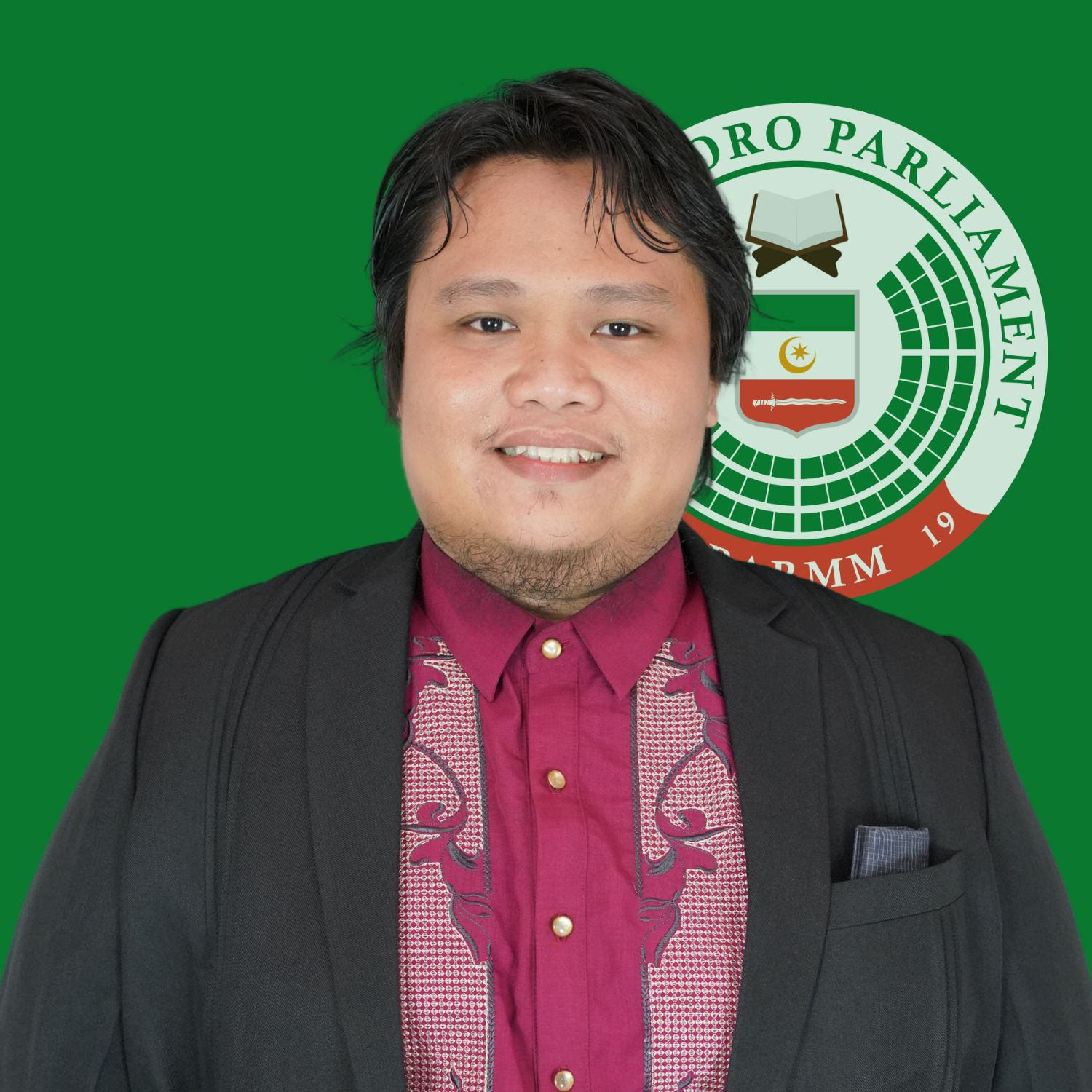

Member of the Bangsamoro Transition Authority Parliament
- Incumbent
- Assumed office February 11, 2020
- Appointed by: Rodrigo Duterte
- Chief Minister: Murad Ebrahim

Personal details
- Born: December 10, 1987 (age 38) Manila, Philippines
- Parent: Salamat Hashim (father)

Abdullah Biston Hashim is a Moro Filipino who is a member of the Bangsamoro Transition Authority Parliament.

== Early life and education ==
Hashim was born on December 10, 1987, in Manila, Philippines. He is the eldest child of Moro Islamic Liberation Front (MILF) founder Salamat Hashim. He used a different surname when he attended elementary and high school classes for his own safety. Hashim stayed in urban areas during school months and stayed at Camp Abubakar during vacation time. He only got to use his real surname when he attended Notre Dame University in Cotabato City, pursuing a bachelor's degree in secondary education, major in math. A Muslim he also studied at the Wisdom Islamic School in Davao City.

== Career ==
Hashim was appointed as a member of the Bangsamoro Transition Authority Parliament by on February 11, 2020, by President Rodrigo Duterte, filling the vacated seat Abdul Dataya who died in office. He secured a new mandate when he was reappointed by President Bongbong Marcos on August 12, 2022.

Hashim has acknowledged expectations to live up with his father's legacy but he would want to build his own reputation. Though he has stated that he would not hesitant to take advantage of his relation with his father when needed, such as when as member of parliament denounced the MILF Salamat Wing faction.

== Personal life ==
Hashim is a Muslim and was inspired to study Islam by his father. He is a member of various Muslim student organizations such as the Muslim Youth Religious Organization (MYRO) and Tabligh Risala Organization (TRO).
