= Bangsamoro Human Rights Commission =

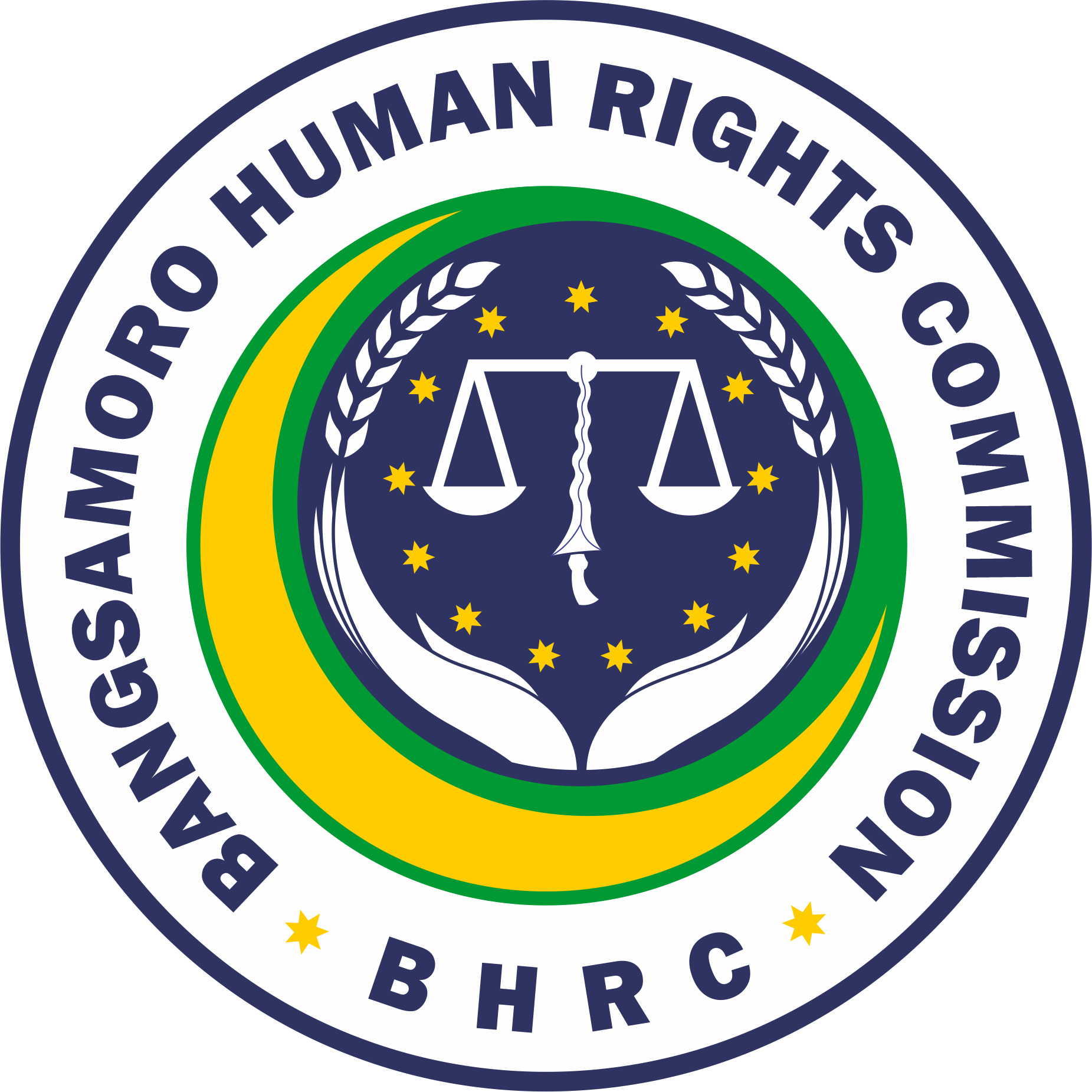

Agency overview
- Formed: 2020
- Jurisdiction: Bangsamoro Autonomous Region in Muslim Mindanao, Philippines

The Bangsamoro Human Rights Commission (BHRC) is a government agency on human rights with jurisdiction over the Bangsamoro Autonomous Region in Muslim Mindanao (BARMM) in the Philippines.

== History ==
The predecessor of the Bangsamoro Autonomous Region in Muslim Mindanao (BARMM), the Autonomous Region in Muslim Mindanao had a local human rights body which was known as the Regional Human Rights Commission (RHRC). The RHRC was created through Muslim Mindanao Autonomy Act (MMAA) No. 288.

When the charter for a Bangsamoro region was being drafted. One of the many contentious provisions was the establishment of a regional equivalent of the national Commission on Human Rights (CHR). The provision was eventually included in the regional charter, the Bangsamoro Organic Law (BOL).

Following the establishment of the BARMM in 2019, the RHRC would have to be made defunct as part of the transition process causing concern that there would be no other organization that would fulfill the RHRC's role if the Bangsamoro Human Rights Commission (BHRC) as mandated by the BOL.

The Bangsamoro Human Rights Commission (BHRC) was institutionalized by virtue of Bangsamoro Autonomy Act No. 4 which was passed by the Bangsamoro Parliament on December 20, 2019 and was signed into law by Chief Minister Murad Ebrahim on January 14, 2020.
