= Abdullah Makapaar =

Former Moro rebel

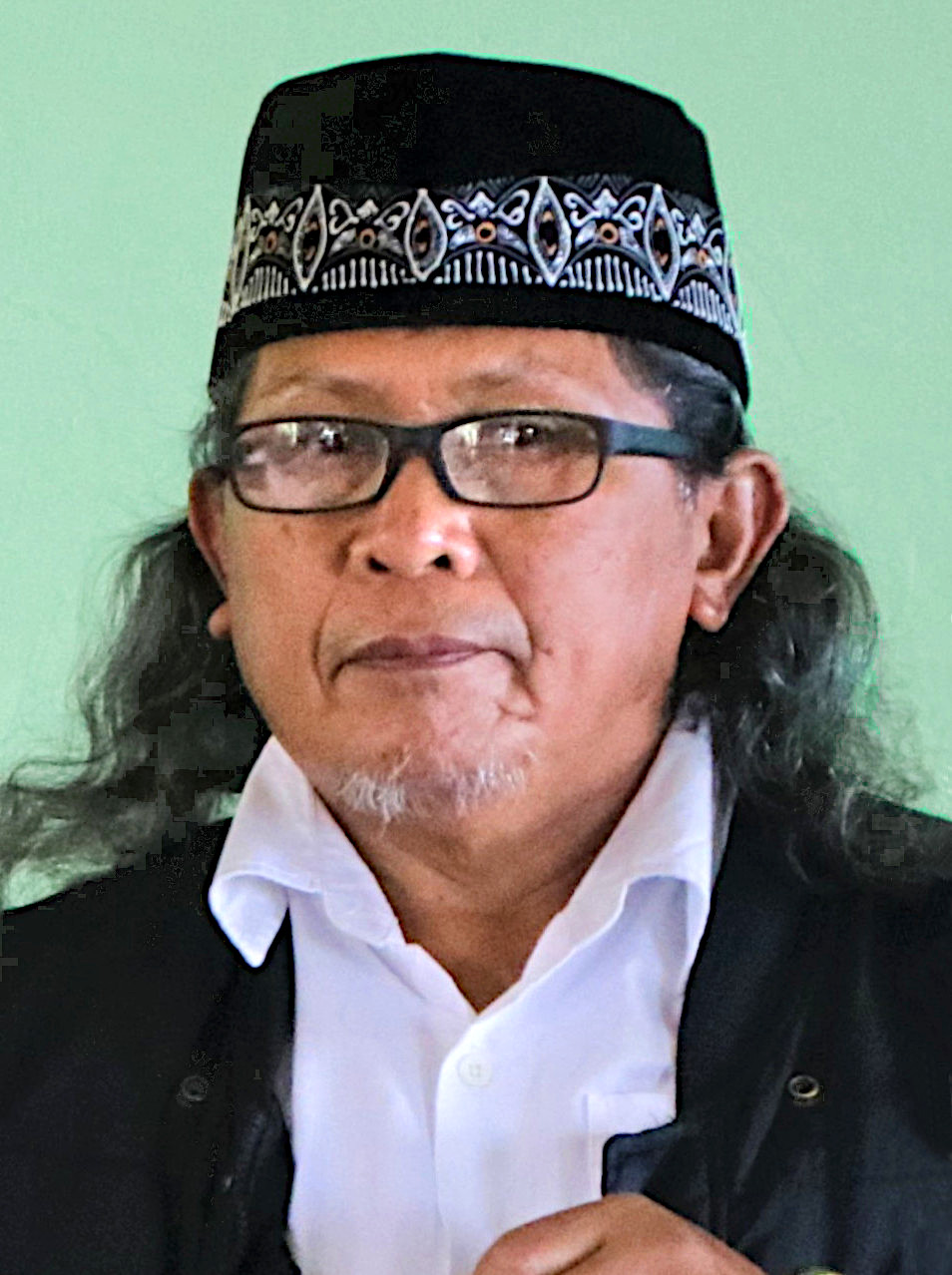

Member of the Bangsamoro Transition Authority Parliament
- Incumbent
- Assumed office 29 March 2019
- Nominated by: Moro Islamic Liberation Front
- Appointed by: Rodrigo Duterte
- Chief Minister: Murad Ebrahim

Personal details
- Born: Abdullah Goldiano Makapaar bin Sabbar; 1960 or 1961 (age 65–66) Delabayan, Kauswagan, Lanao del Norte, Philippines
- Relations: Tagoranao (brother)
- Nickname: Commander Bravo

Military service
- Allegiance: Moro National Liberation Front (formerly); Moro Islamic Liberation Front
- Rank: Brigadier General (MILF)
- Commands: MILF Northwest Mindanao Command
- Battles/wars: Soviet-Afghan War; Moro conflict

Abdullah Goldiano Makapaar bin Sabbar (born 1960 or 1961), commonly known by his nom de guerre Commander Bravo, was a former Moro rebel in the Philippines who fought under the Moro Islamic Liberation Front (MILF) as a commander.

Makapaar is now a politician and member of the Bangsamoro Transition Authority Parliament.

== Early life and education ==
Abdullah Makapaar was born in 1960 or 1961 in Delabayan, Kauswagan, Lanao del Norte, Philippines. He is of Maranao heritage and is the youngest of six children of Sultan Makapaar and Habiba Goldiano. He grew up in the village of Delabayan in Kauswagan in Lanao del Norte. In 1971, he was forced to drop out of elementary school after clashes between the Moro group Barracuda and the government-aligned Christian group Ilaga broke out in Lanao del Norte. This also led his family to flee to the forest after their home was destroyed and some of their relatives were killed due to the conflict.

He went to Saudi Arabia to pursue religious studies while working as a taxi driver. Makapaar also went to Pakistan to study at the Islamic Academy where he had Hashim Salamat, the founder of the Moro secessionist group Moro Islamic Liberation Front (MILF), as his mentor.

== Militant career ==
After the Barracuda–Ilaga clashes, Makapaar along one of his brothers joined the Moro conflict and became a member of the Moro National Liberation Front. In 1973, as part of his rebel training, he adopted the nom de guerre "Bravo", in reference to a radio drama called Diego Salvador since the name meant "victory" to him. He was also came to be known as "James Bond 007 the second", after the death of his brother who was known as Commander James Bond.

Makapaar also fought in the Soviet–Afghan War joining the mujahideen which fought against the Soviet Union and the Soviet-backed Afghan government in the early 1980s. Makapaar has said he learned guerilla tactics from Osama bin Laden within his two years of staying in Afghanistan. Upon his return to the Philippines, he assumed command of the Moro Islamic Liberation Front's northwestern command from his brother who goes by the nom de guerre, Commander James Bond. As commander he launched a "war on drugs" within the organization and imposed Islamic discipline on its members. He held the rank of Brigadier General within the MILF.

He was implicated to have been behind attacks in Lanao del Norte in 2008, after a negotiations for a deal that would create a Bangsamoro Juridical Entity (BJE) was dropped. Makapaar has denied having a direct role on the attacks saying that non-MILF affiliated mujahideen were responsible and maintained that his forces would have retaliated have Philippine government forces attack MILF positions.

In November 2016, Makapaar was accused of being involved in illegal drugs and of setting up his own "government" in Lanao by President Rodrigo Duterte. A month later, he met up with Presidential Adviser on Overseas Filipino Workers and Muslim Concerns Secretary Abdullah Mama-o to reject the accusations with Makapaar saying his activities were in fact supportive of the Duterte administration's war on drugs and that drug syndicates might have given him "wrong information" to frame him.

== Political career ==
Abdullah Makapaar as a member of the MILF campaigned for a "yes" vote in the 2019 Bangsamoro autonomy plebiscite which proposed the creation of the Bangsamoro Autonomous Region in Muslim Mindanao (BARMM) which would replace the Autonomous Region in Muslim Mindanao (ARMM). Part of the plebiscite also called for the inclusion of select towns in Lanao del Norte, which Makapaar advocated for. While voters approved the creation of BARMM in the plebiscite, the joining of the towns in Lanao del Norte was unable to secure votes from the rest of the province to be able to join BARMM.

Abdullah Makapaar was nominated by the MILF in February 2019 to be part of the Bangsamoro Transition Authority Parliament which serves as an interim legislature for the then-newly formed BARMM. In January 2020, he publicly said that he wants to abandon conflict and has urged to push for peace moving forward.

Makapaar ran as the 22nd nominee of the United Bangsamoro Justice Party in the 2026 Bangsamoro Parliament election but lost after the party won only 15 seats.
