= Akmad Abas =

Filipino politician

The Honorable Akmad Abas
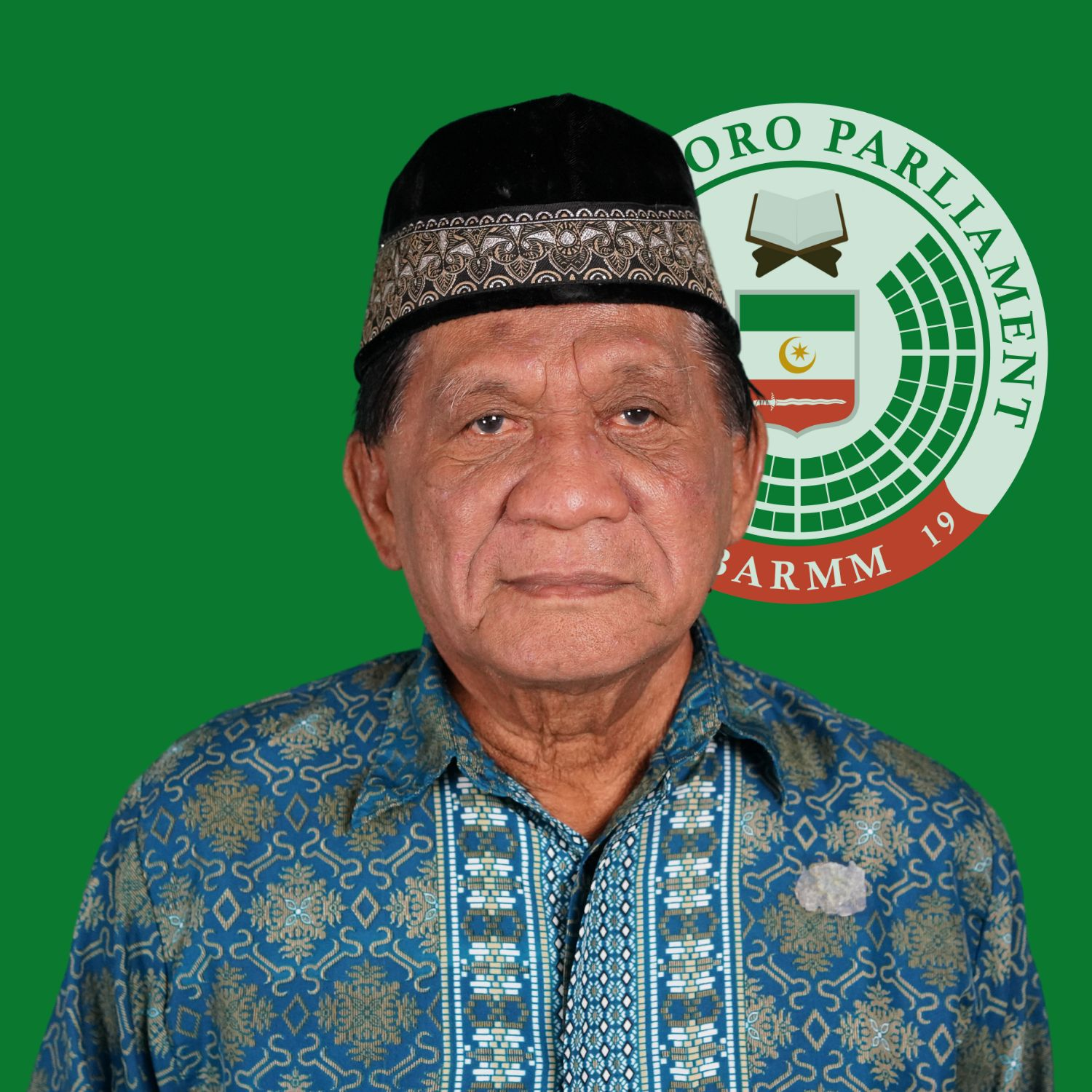
- Official portrait as MP

Member of the Bangsamoro Transition Authority Parliament
- Incumbent
- Assumed office March 29, 2019
- Nominated by: Moro Islamic Liberation Front
- Appointed by: Rodrigo Duterte; Bongbong Marcos

Personal details
- Born: Akmad Indigay Abas
- Education: Central Mindanao College
- Nickname: Commander Jack

Akmad Indigay Abas, commonly known by his nom de guerre Commander Jack, is a Filipino politician, currently serving as a member of the interim Bangsamoro Parliament since 2019. He was a former Moro rebel in the Philippines who fought as a commander under the Moro Islamic Liberation Front (MILF).

== Military career ==
Abas is the commander of the Eastern Mindanao Front of the Bangsamoro Islamic Armed Forces, the military wing of the MILF. He is also a representative of the MILF in the Board of Directors of the Independent Decommissioning Body, a body created by the Philippine government and the MILF responsible for overseeing the decommissioning process of MILF forces and weapons.

== Political career ==
Abas was nominated by the MILF to serve as a member of the 1st Bangsamoro Transition Authority Parliament, and thereafter appointed by President Rodrigo Duterte in 2019. He was re-appointed to the Parliament in 2025 by President Bongbong Marcos.
