= Lanang Ali Jr. =

Filipino politician

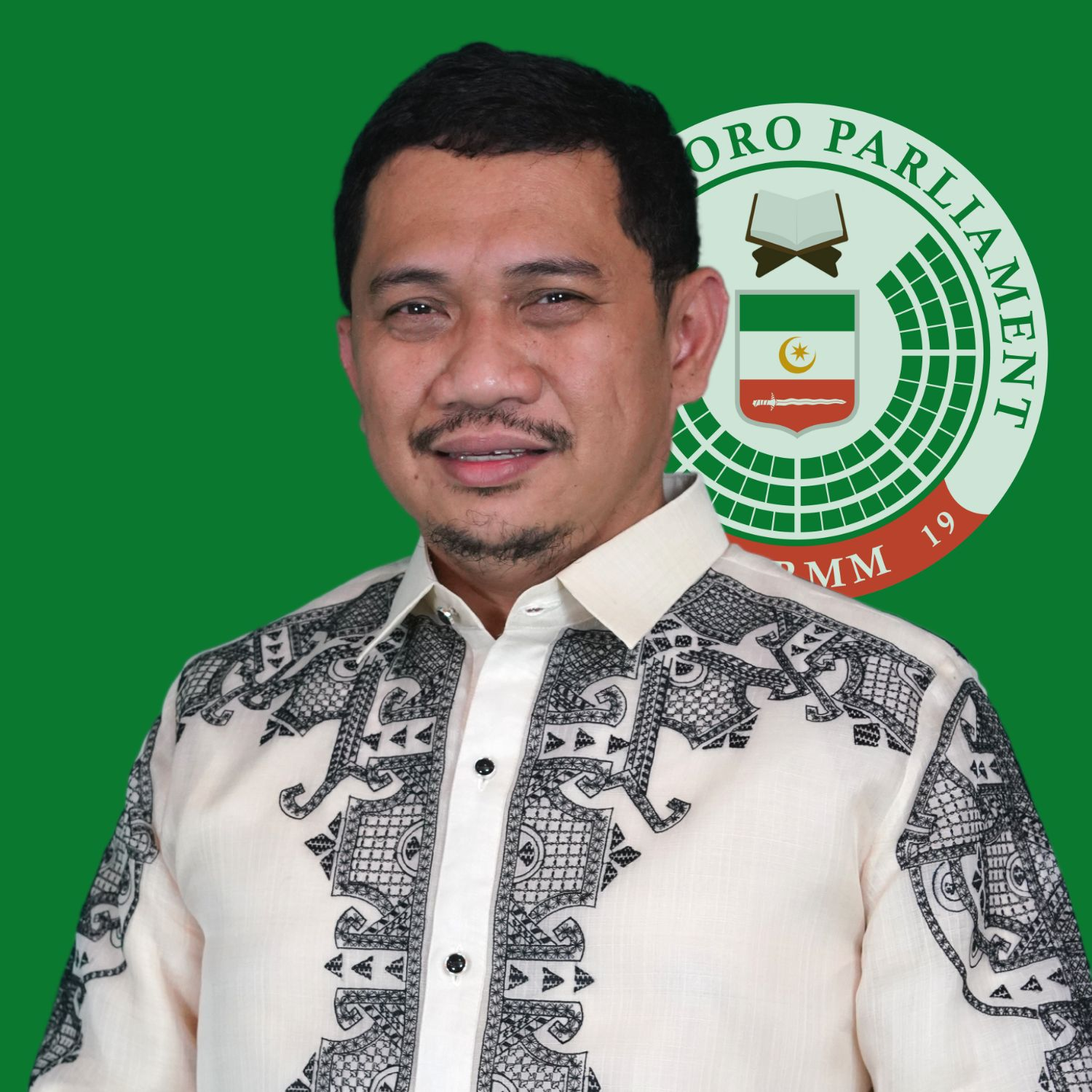

Majority Leader of the Bangsamoro Transition Authority Parliament
- In office March 29, 2019 – September 15, 2022
- Nominated by: Bangsamoro Transition Authority
- Chief Minister: Murad Ebrahim
- Preceded by: Office established
- Succeeded by: Sha Elijah Dumama-Alba

Member of the Bangsamoro Transition Authority Parliament
- Incumbent
- Assumed office 29 March 2019
- Nominated by: Moro Islamic Liberation Front
- Appointed by: Rodrigo Duterte
- Chief Minister: Murad Ebrahim

Personal details
- Born: Sultan Kudarat, Maguindanao del Norte
- Occupation: Lawyer, politician

Lanang Tapodoc Ali Jr. is a Filipino politician and lawyer who is a member of the interim Bangsamoro Parliament. He is also the Majority Leader of the regional parliament.

== Background ==
Ali was born in Sultan Kudarat, Maguindanao del Norte. He obtained both his bachelor's degree in political science and law degree at the Lyceum of the Philippines University.

== Legal career ==
As a lawyer he represented the Moro Islamic Liberation Front.

== Bangsamoro Parliament ==
Ali ran unopposed for the position of Majority leader of the Bangsamoro Transition Authority Parliament and was elected to the position on March 29, 2019. At the beginning of the 2nd interim parliament on September 12, 2022, Ali was re-elected again as Majority leader.
