= Mohagher Iqbal =

Filipino politician, former rebel leader, and peace negotiator

- Official portrait, 2026

Member of the Bangsamoro Parliament
- Incumbent
- Assumed office 30 October 2026

Member of the Bangsamoro Transition Authority Parliament
- In office 22 February 2019 – 30 October 2026
- Nominated by: Moro Islamic Liberation Front
- Appointed by: Rodrigo Duterte
- Chief Minister: Murad Ebrahim
Ministerial offices
Minister of Basic, Higher and Technical Education
In office 26 February 2019 – 18 May 2026
Chief Minister	Murad Ebrahim
Preceded by	Office established
Succeeded by	Abdulraof Macacua (caretaker)

Personal details
- Born: 1947 or 1948 (age 78–79) Cotabato City, Philippines
- Party: United Bangsamoro Justice Party
- Occupation: Politician, peace negotiator

Military service
- Allegiance: Moro National Liberation Front (1972–1977); Moro Islamic Liberation Front (1977–2019)
- Years of service: 1972–2019
- Battles/wars: Moro conflict

Datucan M. Abas (born in Cotabato City), better known by his nom de guerre of Mohagher Iqbal, a Filipino politician and former revolutionary leader who was the chief peace negotiator of the Moro Islamic Liberation Front (MILF) and was a principal signatory of the 2012 Framework Agreement on the Bangsamoro and the 2014 Comprehensive Agreement on the Bangsamoro, which paved the way for the creation of the Bangsamoro Autonomous Region in Muslim Mindanao (BARMM). Since February 2019, he has served as the first MBHTE minister and as a member of the Bangsamoro Transition Authority Parliament.

== Early life and education ==
Iqbal was born around 1947 or 1948 in Cotabato City and grew up in what is now Datu Odin Sinsuat, Maguindanao del Norte. He earned a Bachelor of Science in Political Science with a minor in History in 1969 and a Master of Arts in political science in 1972 from Manuel L. Quezon University in Manila; his graduate thesis was titled The Muslim Secession Movement in the Philippines.

== Revolutionary career ==
=== Entry into the Moro movement ===
After the declaration of martial law in 1972, Iqbal joined the Moro National Liberation Front (MNLF) as a foot soldier in Cotabato and later chaired the Kutawato Revolutionary Committee's propaganda arm. Following the 1977 schism, he joined the Moro Islamic Liberation Front, chaired its Committee on Information from 1979, and was elected to the Central Committee.

=== MILF negotiator ===
In July 2003, the MILF leadership appointed Iqbal chair of its peace negotiating panel with the Government of the Philippines, overseeing ceasefire and normalization mechanisms and representing the MILF in formal talks.

== Role in the peace process ==
Iqbal was a principal signatory to:

- the Framework Agreement on the Bangsamoro, signed 15 October 2012;
- the Comprehensive Agreement on the Bangsamoro, signed 27 March 2014 at Malacañang Palace, which formally concluded peace negotiations between the GPH and the MILF.

He chaired the Bangsamoro Transition Commission (BTC), which drafted the Bangsamoro Basic Law, from 2013 to 2016, and returned as a commissioner when the BTC was expanded in 2017.

== Political career ==
=== Bangsamoro Transition Authority Parliament ===
Iqbal took his oath as a member of the Bangsamoro Transition Authority (BTA) on 22 February 2019; the BTA Parliament held its inaugural session on 29 March 2019 in Cotabato City.

=== Minister of MBHTE ===
Following ratification of the Bangsamoro Organic Law, President Rodrigo Duterte appointed Iqbal the inaugural Minister of Basic, Higher and Technical Education on 26 February 2019. The MBHTE consolidated regional functions for basic and higher education and technical–vocational training. As minister, Iqbal has led sectoral coordination and programs on school infrastructure, teacher development, and learning resources across the region.

He has also pursued partnerships with national universities. In 2022, the MBHTE and the University of the Philippines signed accords on teacher training and graduate education.

In November 2024, Iqbal highlighted MBHTE's achievements at the Second Bangsamoro Education Summit, including over 1.1 million enrolled students, expansion of the AKAP program for remote learners, and growth of madrasah education and teacher hiring.

In 2025, MBHTE launched “Project Iqbal” to distribute learning kits and devices to ensure no Bangsamoro learner is left behind, and rolled out Peace and Justice Education modules with Save the Children and EU support.

In August 2025, the Commission on Audit ordered a special audit of MBHTE's ₱2.2 billion worth of alleged anomalous disbursements, including ₱1.77 billion paid in a single day and ₱449 million to one supplier.

On 11 May 2026, Chief Minister Abdulraof Macacua ordered Iqbal to tender his resignation until 18 May on which he would have deemed "resigned". Iqbal confirmed his removal on 22 May but disputed the manner of his removal alleging he was not given a chance to properly turned over the ministry. Macacua took over the education ministry.

== Names and authorship ==
Mohagher Iqbal has been associated with multiple names. Iqbal itself is his nom de guerre as an MILF member. In 2015, a Senate hearing raised the allegation that his real name is Datucan M. Abas. Iqbal declined to publicly confirm the claim, saying noms de guerre were commonly used in revolutionary contexts and that the government knew his identity. Iqbal co-signed key agreements with government panel chair Miriam Coronel-Ferrer, who later affirmed that Iqbal's identity was known to and accepted by the government.

Writing under the pen name Salah Jubair, Iqbal has authored several works on the Bangsamoro struggle and the peace process, including:

- Bangsamoro: A Nation Under Endless Tyranny (multiple editions)
- The Long Road to Peace: Inside the GRP–MILF Peace Process
- Negotiating Peace: An Insider Perspective of the Bangsamoro Struggle for Self-Determination (2018).

As of 2026, Mohagher Iqbal remains the name he primarily uses in public, including on official documents he signs. Datucan M. Abas has also been publicly associated with him and appears in the United Bangsamoro Justice Party's list of nominees for the first Bangsamoro parliamentary elections.

== See also ==
- Moro conflict
- Hashim Salamat
- Murad Ebrahim
