= Laisa Alamia =

Filipino politician and lawyer

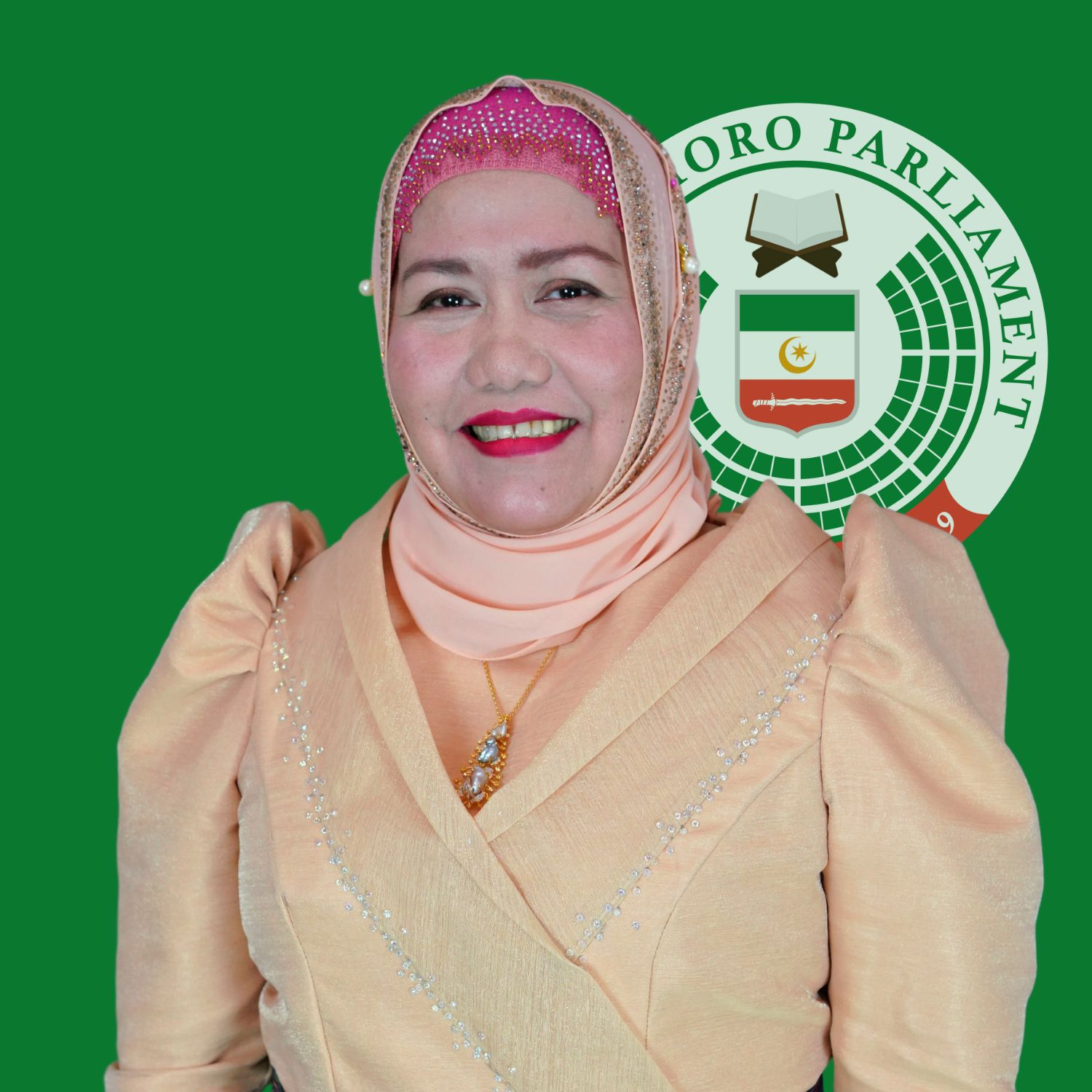

Minority Leader of the Bangsamoro Transition Authority Parliament
- In office March 29, 2019 – September 15, 2022
- Nominated by: Bangsamoro Transition Authority
- Chief Minister: Murad Ebrahim
- Preceded by: Office established
- Succeeded by: Office abolished

Member of the Bangsamoro Transition Authority Parliament
- Incumbent
- Assumed office March 29, 2019
- Nominated by: Philippine national government
- Appointed by: Rodrigo Duterte
- Chief Minister: Murad Ebrahim

Personal details
- Born: 1971 or 1972 (age 54–55)
- Education: Ateneo de Zamboanga University; Western Mindanao State University
- Occupation: Politician, lawyer, activist

Laisa Masuhud Alamia (born 1971 or 1972) is a Filipino politician and lawyer who is a member of the interim Bangsamoro Parliament. She is also the Minority Leader of the regional parliament.

A lawyer, she was Executive Secretary of the defunct Autonomous Region in Muslim Mindanao (ARMM), ARMM Social Welfare Secretary, and is the first ARMM Regional Human Rights Commission chairperson. She is also a Tausug from Basilan.

Alamia was nominated for the position of Speaker of the Bangsamoro Transition Authority Parliament. She lost to Pangalian Balindong and became Minority Leader of the regional parliament on March 29, 2019.

She was appointed as chair of the Task Force for Decommissioned Combatants and their Communities (TFDCC) which is tasked to oversee the decommissioning of the Moro Islamic Liberation Front.
