= Fatmawati Salapuddin =

Filipino politician

Fatmawati Salapuddin is a Filipino politician and director of the Sulu-based Lupah Sug Bangsamoro Women's Association.
