= Bangsamoro Organic Law =

2018 Philippine law establishing the Bangsamoro autonomous region

Congress of the Philippines
- Long title: An Act Providing for the Organic Law for the Bangsamoro Autonomous Region in Muslim Mindanao, Repealing for the purpose Republic Act No. 6734, Entitled "An Act providing an Organic Act for the Autonomous Region in Muslim Mindanao", as amended by Republic Act No. 9054, Entitled "An Act to strengthen and expand the Organic Act for the Autonomous Region in Muslim Mindanao"
- Citation: Republic Act No. 11054
- Territorial extent: Plebiscite: Autonomous Region in Muslim Mindanao; Cotabato City; Isabela, Basilan; 6 municipalities in Lanao del Norte; 39 barangays in Cotabato; And areas contiguous to the above; Post ratification: Bangsamoro
- Passed by: House of Representatives of the Philippines
- Passed: July 24, 2018
- Passed by: Senate of the Philippines
- Passed: July 23, 2018
- Signed by: President Rodrigo Duterte
- Signed: July 26, 2018
- Effective: August 10, 2018

Legislative history

Initiating chamber: House of Representatives of the Philippines
- Bill title: Providing for the Basic Law for the Bangsamoro and Abolishing the Autonomous Region in Muslim Mindanao, Repealing for the Purpose Republic Act No. 9054, Entitled "An Act to Strengthen and Expand the Organic Act for the Autonomous Region in Muslim Mindanao", and Republic Act No. 6734, Entitled, "A Act Providing for an Organic Act for the Autonomous Region in Muslim Mindanao"
- Bill citation: House Bill No. 6475
- Introduced by: Speaker Pantaleon Alvarez, Majority Leader Rodolfo Fariñas, Minority Leader Danilo Suarez et al.
- First reading: October 3, 2017
- Second reading: May 30, 2018
- Third reading: May 30, 2018

Revising chamber: Senate of the Philippines
- Bill title: Basic Law for the Bangsamoro
- Bill citation: Senate Bill No. 1717
- Member(s) in charge: Senate President Aquilino Pimentel III et al.
- First reading: February 28, 2018
- Second reading: May 31, 2018
- Third reading: May 31, 2018
- Conference committee bill passed by House of Representatives of the Philippines: July 24, 2018
- Conference committee bill passed by Senate of the Philippines: July 23, 2018
- Status: In force

The Bangsamoro Organic Law (BOL; Filipino: Batayang Batas para sa Rehiyong Awtonomo ng Bangsamoro), also known as the Bangsamoro Basic Law (BBL), and officially designated as Republic Act No. 11054, is a Philippine law that provided for the establishment of the Bangsamoro Autonomous Region in Muslim Mindanao (BARMM).

Legislative efforts for the establishment of a Bangsamoro autonomous region was first proposed and deliberated upon by the 16th Congress of the Philippines but failed to pass into law. The issue was taken up once again in the 17th Congress. The legislation was ratified by both the Senate and the House of Representatives on July 23 and 24, 2018 respectively. The bill was finally signed into law by President Rodrigo Duterte on July 26, 2018. The provisions of the law became effective on August 10, 2018.

As an organic act, the basic law abolished the Autonomous Region in Muslim Mindanao (ARMM) and provided for the basic structure of government for Bangsamoro, following the agreements set forth in the Comprehensive Agreement on the Bangsamoro peace agreement signed between the government of the Philippines and the Moro Islamic Liberation Front in 2014.

A two-part plebiscite was held on January 21 (for ARMM areas) and February 6 (for Cotabato and the six municipalities in Lanao del Norte, including areas who petitioned to join the region), creating Bangsamoro and formally abolishing the ARMM.

== Parts of the proposed law ==
The various portions of BBL as proposed by the Bangsamoro Transition Commission which had been assigned to draft the bill include sections covering (but not limited to) Bangsamoro identity, Bangsamoro territory, Bangsamoro government, Bangsamoro justice system, Bangsamoro basic rights, Bangsamoro economic, financial, and fiscal framework and provisions relating transition to the proposed Bangsamoro Autonomous Region.

== Legislative history ==
=== 16th Congress ===
Following the signing of the Framework Agreement on the Bangsamoro after talks between the government and the Moro Islamic Liberation Front (MILF) in 2012, the Bangsamoro Transition Commission (BTC) was instituted by President Benigno Aquino to create a draft for a Bangsamoro Basic Law. In March 2014, the Comprehensive Agreement on the Bangsamoro was signed which would serve as basis for the BBL. In August, the BTC's second draft was handed over to President Aquino.

The draft of the law was submitted by President Benigno Aquino III to Congress leaders on September 10, 2014. An ad hoc committee assigned to the bill by the House of Representatives passed its version of the bill, House Bill No. 5811, on May 20, 2015.

In the Senate, a revised version of the BBL, known as the Bangsamoro Autonomous Region Law (Senate Bill No. 2894), was presented on August 11, 2015 after lengthy deliberations on the BBL in the Committee on Local Government, and was due for interpellation on August 17, 2015. Due to the length and complexity of the bill, however, the Senate temporarily deferred the period of interpellation for the bill. The 16th Congress went on recess without passing the bill on February 2, 2016.

==== Mamasapano clash and public reaction ====
On Sunday, January 25, 2015, three platoons of the elite Special Action Force (SAF) under the Philippine National Police entered the guerrilla enclave of Tukanalipao, Mindanao, Philippines, with the goal of detaining two high-ranking Jemaah Islamiyah-affiliated, improvised-explosive-device experts, Zulkifli Abdhir (also known as Marwan) and Abdul Basit Usman. The SAF troops raided the hut where they believed Marwan was located, and the man they believed to be Marwan engaged them in a firefight and was killed. However, the shooting alerted armed forces in the area. What followed was a bloody encounter that left 44 SAF, 18 MILF, and 5 BIFF dead, where the 44 SAF members were trapped with little ammunition between the rogue BIFF and a group of MILF fighters. A video was released afterwards which showed MILF fighters shooting the feet of a SAF member then shooting the head twice while taking the video.

Supposedly as a result of the negative media coverage arising from the Mamasapano incident, the March 2015 survey conducted by public opinions polling group Pulse Asia found that 44% of Filipinos were opposed to the Bangsamoro Basic Law's passage, with only 22% supporting its passage. Opposition to the law was strongest among the poor (45% in Class D, 43% in Class E) and among those living in Mindanao (62%). Awareness of the law was high, at 88%.

With the collapse in popularity of the bill, House Speaker Feliciano Belmonte, Jr. acknowledged the prospect that the bill might be rejected by Congress in the face of stiff public opposition, and hoped that the government would produce a "Plan B".

=== 17th Congress ===
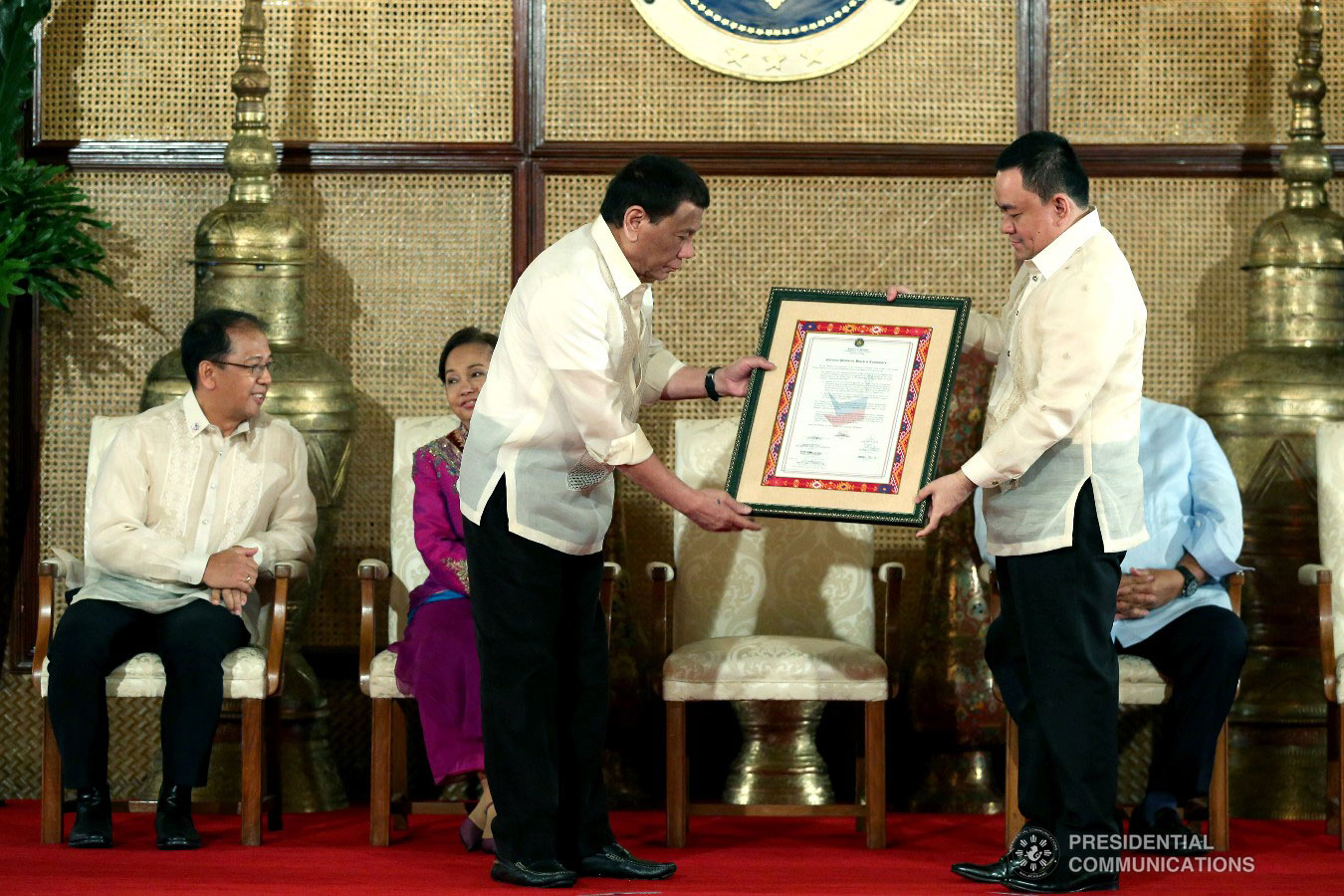
President Rodrigo Duterte (standing, left) receives the result of the plebiscite for the Bangsamoro Organic Law from COMELEC Chairman Sheriff Abas during a ceremony at the Malacañan Palace on February 22, 2019.

The passage of BBL was not initially set to be tackled by the 17th Congress. After being pushed by President Rodrigo Duterte, the Congress began reading BBL for the first time in the House of Representatives (as House Bill No. 6475) and the Senate (as Senate Bill No. 1717) on October 3, 2017, and February 28, 2018, respectively. BBL passed the second and third readings in both the House and the Senate on May 30 and 31, 2018.

Both bills were supposed to be enacted before the third State of the Nation Address (SONA) by President Duterte, with the Senate ratified the bicameral conference committee report on the morning of July 23, 2018, but the House, under the speakership of Pantaleon Alvarez, failed to ratify the bicameral conference committee report before SONA. While the Palace was dismayed by the delayed ratification of the report by the House, Alvarez was ousted from the Speaker's seat and replaced by former President Gloria Macapagal-Arroyo. As promised by Arroyo once she took the Speaker's seat, the report was ratified on July 24, 2018, paving the way for both Bills of the House and the Senate to be transmitted to the President for enactment.

President Duterte signed the Bangsamoro Organic Law on July 26, 2018, after asking for 48 hours during his SONA to review the bill.

== Relevant agreements ==
=== The Framework Agreement on the Bangsamoro ===
On October 15, 2012, a preliminary peace agreement was signed in the Malacañan Palace between the Moro Islamic Liberation Front and the Government of the Philippines. This was the Framework Agreement on the Bangsamoro, which called for the creation of an autonomous political entity named Bangsamoro, replacing the Autonomous Region in Muslim Mindanao.

The signing came at the end of peace talks held in Kuala Lumpur in Malaysia from October 2–6. These talks were the last of 32 peace talks between the two parties, which spanned a period of nine years.

==== Annexes and Addendum ====
The Framework Agreement was later fleshed out by four Annexes and an addendum:

- The Annex on Transitional Modalities and Arrangements – established the transitional process for the establishment of the Bangsamoro, and detailed the creation of the Bangsamoro Transition Commission, the Bangsamoro Transition Authority, and the Bangsamoro Basic Law. This Annex was signed on February 27, 2013.
- The Annex on Revenue Generation and Wealth Sharing – enumerated the sources of wealth creation and financial assistance for the new Bangsamoro entity. This Annex was signed on July 13, 2013.
- The Annex on Power Sharing – discussed intergovernmental relations of the central government, the Bangsamoro government and the local government units under the Bangsamoro. This Annex was signed on December 8, 2013.
- The Annex on Normalization – paved the way for the laying down of weapons of MILF members and their transition to civilian life. Normalization is the process through which the communities affected by the conflict in Mindanao can return to peaceful life and pursue sustainable livelihood. This Annex was signed on January 25, 2014.
- The Addendum on the Bangsamoro Waters and Zones of Joint Cooperation – Signed on January 25, 2014, this addendum detailed the scope of waters under the territorial jurisdiction of the Bangsamoro (12 nautical miles from the coast), and Zones of Joint Cooperation or bodies of water (Sulu Sea and Moro Gulf) within the territory of the Philippines but not within the Bangsamoro.

=== The Comprehensive Agreement on the Bangsamoro ===
On March 27, 2014, a final peace agreement fully fleshing out the terms of the framework agreement and annexes, known as the Comprehensive Agreement on Bangsamoro (CAB) was signed between the two parties. Under the agreement, the Islamic separatists would turn over their firearms to a third party, which would be selected by the rebels and the Philippine government. The MILF had agreed to decommission its armed wing, the Bangsamoro Islamic Armed Forces (BIAF). In return, the government would establish an autonomous Bangsamoro. Power sharing was a central point to the autonomy redesign.

== Issues concerning BBL ==
=== Indigenous rights ===
Numerous indigenous groups in the Bangsamoro region do not adhere to Catholicism nor Islam, making them vulnerable to exploitation in a proposed Muslim-controlled regional government. In 2015, various indigenous people groups rejected the formation of the Bangsamoro due to lack of consultation with all stakeholders, especially the non-Muslim indigenous people who form a huge minority in the proposed region, Meaning, they oppose the possible enforcement of the Sharia Law.

=== Application of Shariah ===
On July 12, 2018, a bicameral conference committee approved the application of Shariah law to all Muslims in the Bangsamoro Autonomous Region. The Islamic laws shall not apply on non-Muslims, but they "may volunteer to submit to the jurisdiction of Shari'ah courts."

=== Christian concerns ===
Roman Catholics and numerous Christian groups form a huge presence in several areas in the proposed Bangsamoro and surrounding areas, notably in Basilan, Cotabato City, the Cotabato region, Zamboanga City, Zamboanga provinces, and Lanao del Norte. Various cities and municipalities, notably Isabela City in Basilan and Zamboanga City have rejected their inclusion in the Bangsamoro region.

=== Constitutionality ===
The Philippine Constitution Association believes that the Bangsamoro Organic Law will lead to the destruction and dismemberment of the Philippines. They also view the provision as unconstitutional saying that the constitution must be amended since it only consent to one autonomous region in Mindanao viewing the Bangsamoro Autonomous Region as a distinct political entity to the Autonomous Region in Muslim Mindanao. It also criticized the powers given to the Bangsamoro regional legislature which it says are originally reserved to the Philippine Congress. It also objects to some revenue from taxation going straight to the Bangsamoro region which it says gives "unfair" advantage over other regions.

== See also ==
- Moro Islamic Liberation Front
- Moro National Liberation Front
- Bangsamoro Human Rights Commission
