= Bangsamoro Transition Authority =

Interim regional government of Bangsamoro, Philippines

- Parliament seal (Note: The Bangsamoro Transition Authority has no insignia of its own but uses the seal of the Bangsamoro Parliament.)

Overview
- Established: February 22, 2019
- Dissolved: October 30, 2026
- Country: Philippines
- Polity: Bangsamoro Autonomous Region in Muslim Mindanao
- Leader: Chief Minister
- Appointed by: President of the Philippines; members are nominated by both the Moro Islamic Liberation Front (MILF) and the Philippine government
- Main organ: Cabinet
- Responsible to: Parliament (itself serving as the interim parliament)
- Headquarters: BTA Parliament Building, Bangsamoro Government Center, Cotabato City
- Website: parliament.bangsamoro.gov.ph

The Bangsamoro Transition Authority (BTA) was the interim government of the Bangsamoro Autonomous Region in Muslim Mindanao (BARMM) in the Philippines from 2019 to 2026. During the Bangsamoro transition period, it exercised the region's executive and legislative powers.

== History ==
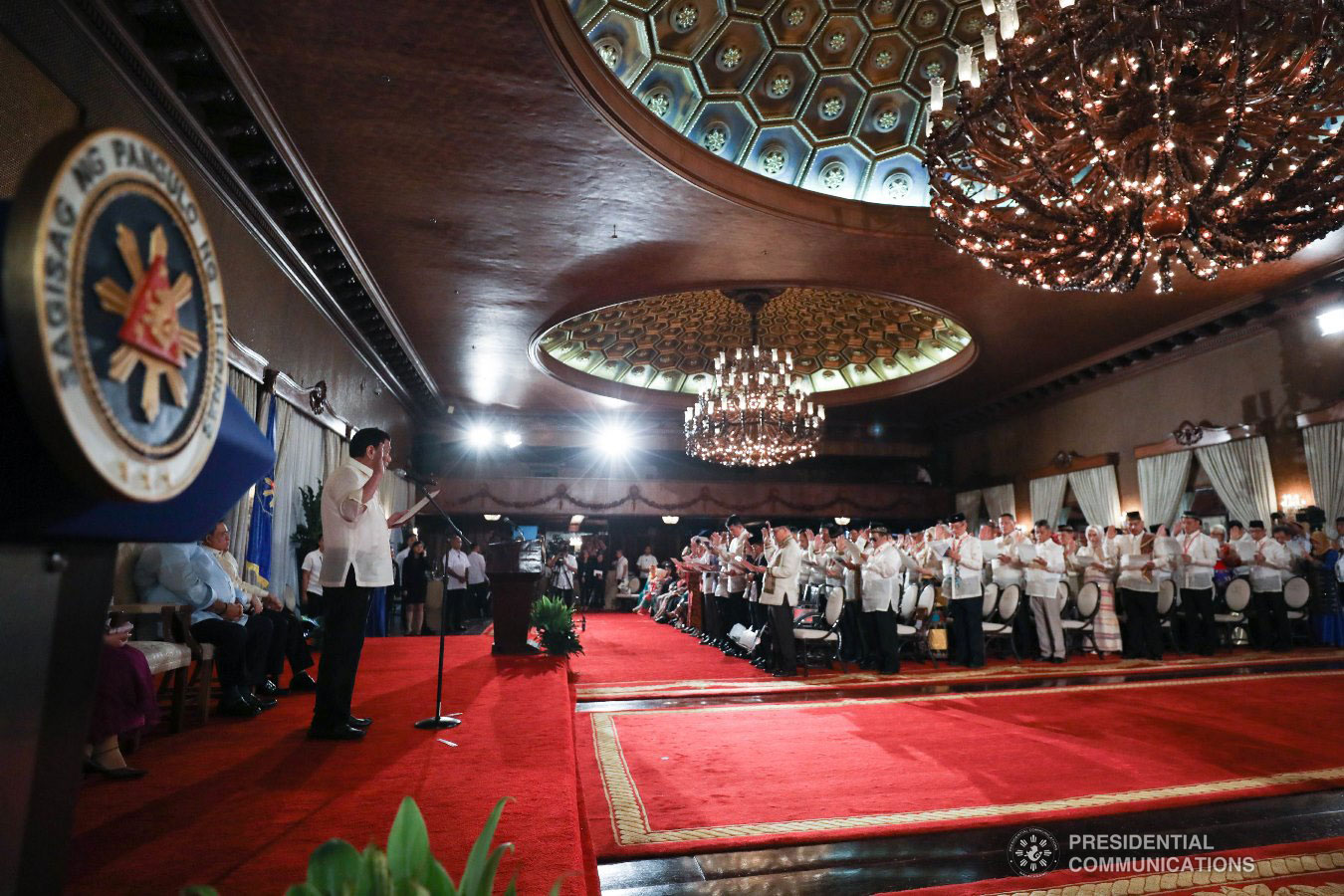
President Rodrigo Duterte administers the oath to the members of the Bangsamoro Transition Authority during a ceremony at the Malacañang Palace on February 22, 2019.

With the ratification of the Bangsamoro Organic Law following a plebiscite on January 21, 2019, the abolition process of the Autonomous Region in Muslim Mindanao (ARMM) began, paving the way for the formal creation of the Bangsamoro Autonomous Region. Under the law, a transition body, the Bangsamoro Transition Authority (BTA), was to be organized pending the election of the new region's government officials in 2022.

The BTA was planned to be constituted in February 2019. It was projected that the transition body would be composed of a total of 105 members (80 appointed members and 25 elected officials of the ARMM) until June 30, 2019. After that date, the body would be composed of only 80 members.

Until the BTA was constituted, Section 5 of Article XVI of the Bangsamoro Organic Law provided for a caretaker body consisting of the same 25 ARMM officials as well as the original 20 members of the Bangsamoro Transition Commission.

The 80 appointed members of the BTA took their oath on February 22, 2019, while the official turnover of the ARMM to the Bangsamoro Autonomous Region occurred on February 26, 2019. The transition authority also had a legislative function during the transition period, with the BTA first convening as the interim Bangsamoro Parliament on March 29, 2019.

== Transition work ==
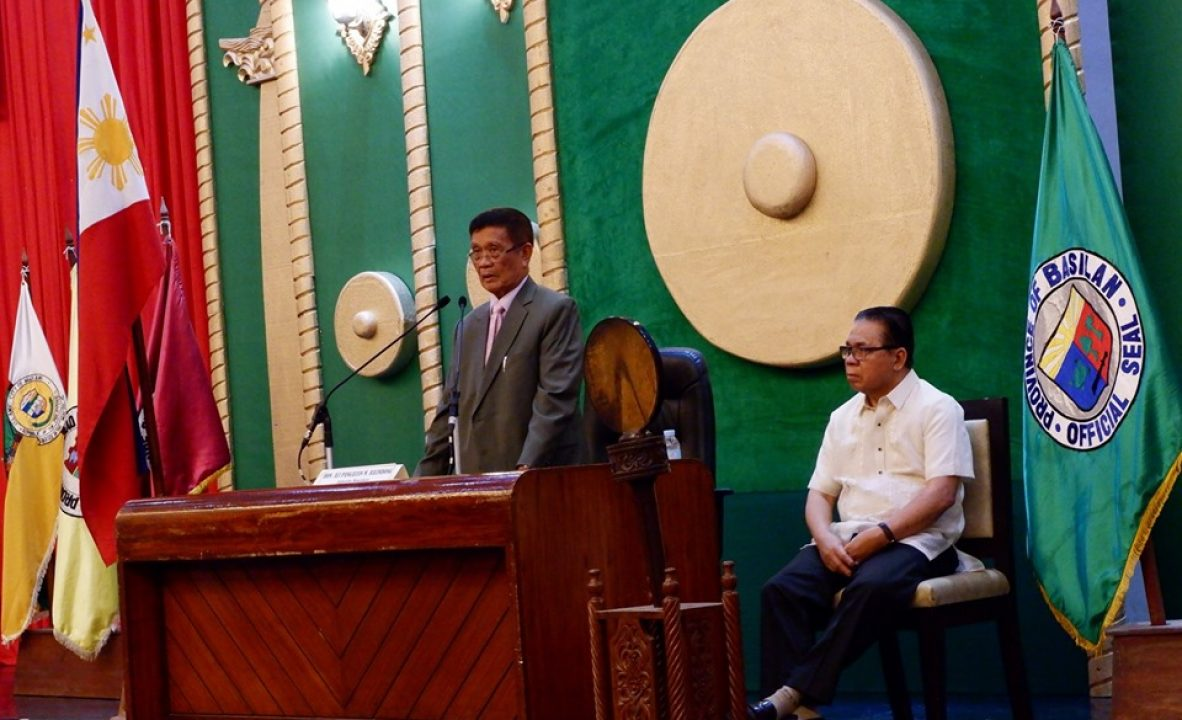
The BTA as the interim parliament holding a special session.

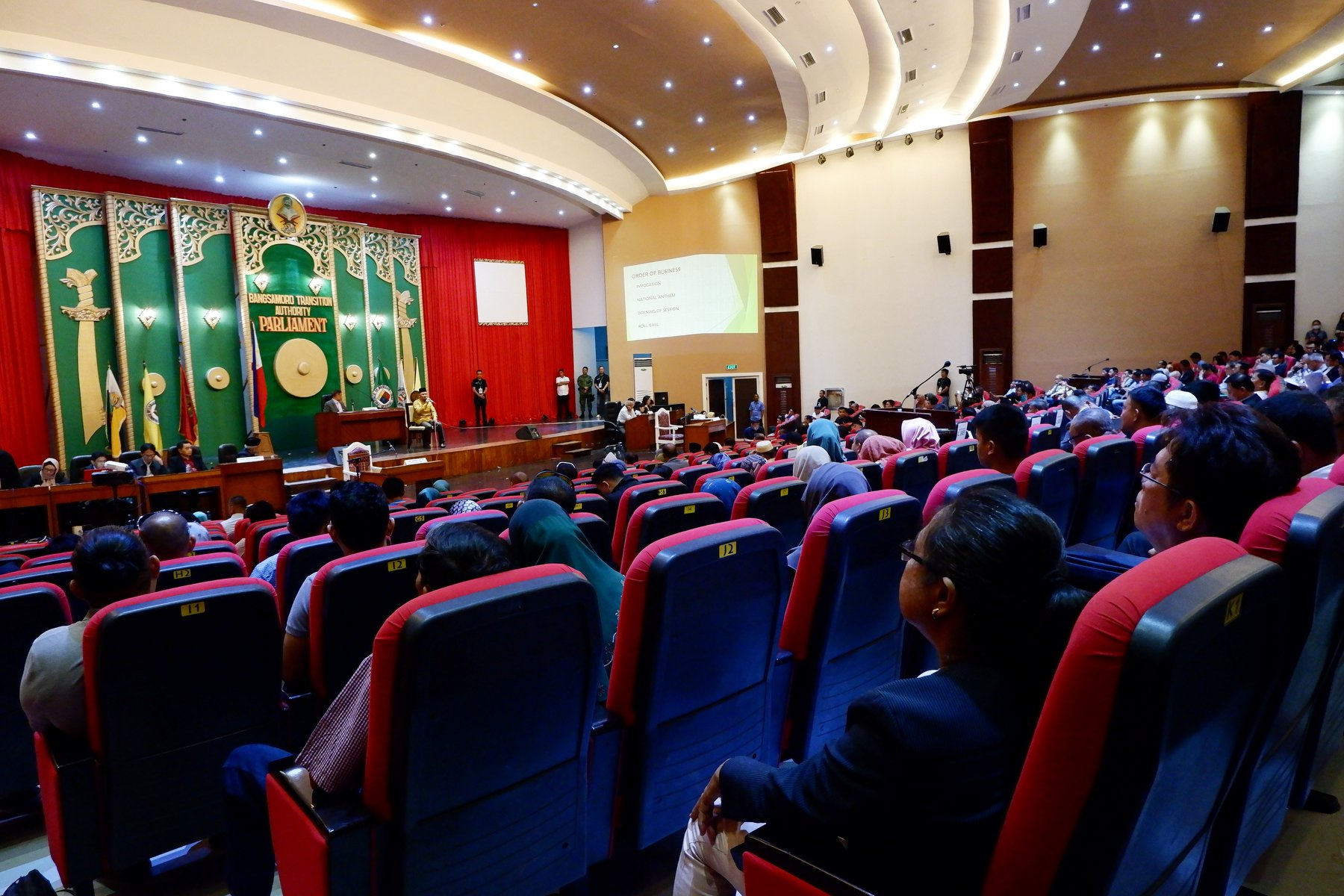
The BTA as the interim parliament holds office at the Shariff Kabunsuan Cultural Complex.

During the transition period, the BTA, acting as the interim parliament, had obligations to fulfill.

=== Transition plan ===
The Bangsamoro Organic Law mandates the interim chief minister to submit to the BTA, within the first 60 days of the transition period, a transition plan containing the Bangsamoro government's "proposed organizational plan, as well as, the schedule for implementation therefor." It also requires the BTA to approve or take action on the proposed plan within 10 days of its submission. If the BTA fails to act upon the plan within 10 days, the plan would be automatically approved and implemented within 15 days. According to Chief Minister Murad Ebrahim, the start of the transition period for the purpose of submitting the transition plan was March 29, the date of the inaugural session of the interim parliament. The plan's deadline was stated to be in May 2019.

The transition plan was then submitted to the Bangsamoro Parliament on June 17, 2019, and was approved by the legislature the following day.

=== Priority laws ===
The BTA, as the interim Bangsamoro Parliament, was also required to pass into law the "priority legislation" enumerated in the Bangsamoro Organic Law. Following the fourth session of the parliament, eight ad hoc committees were formed to draft the priority legislation.

== Interim Parliament ==
The Bangsamoro Transition Authority has acted as the Bangsamoro Parliament on an interim basis. There have been two parliaments under the BTA acting as the interim parliament: the 1st (2019–2022) and the 2nd parliament (2022–present).

| Parliament | First appointment (of BTA members) | First session | Chief minister |
|---|---|---|---|
| 1st | February 22, 2019 | March 29, 2019 | Murad Ebrahim |
| 2nd | August 12, 2022 | September 15, 2022 | Murad Ebrahim |

== See also ==
- Cabinet of Murad Ebrahim
