= Bangsamoro transition period =

2019–2026 transition to the Bangsamoro autonomous region

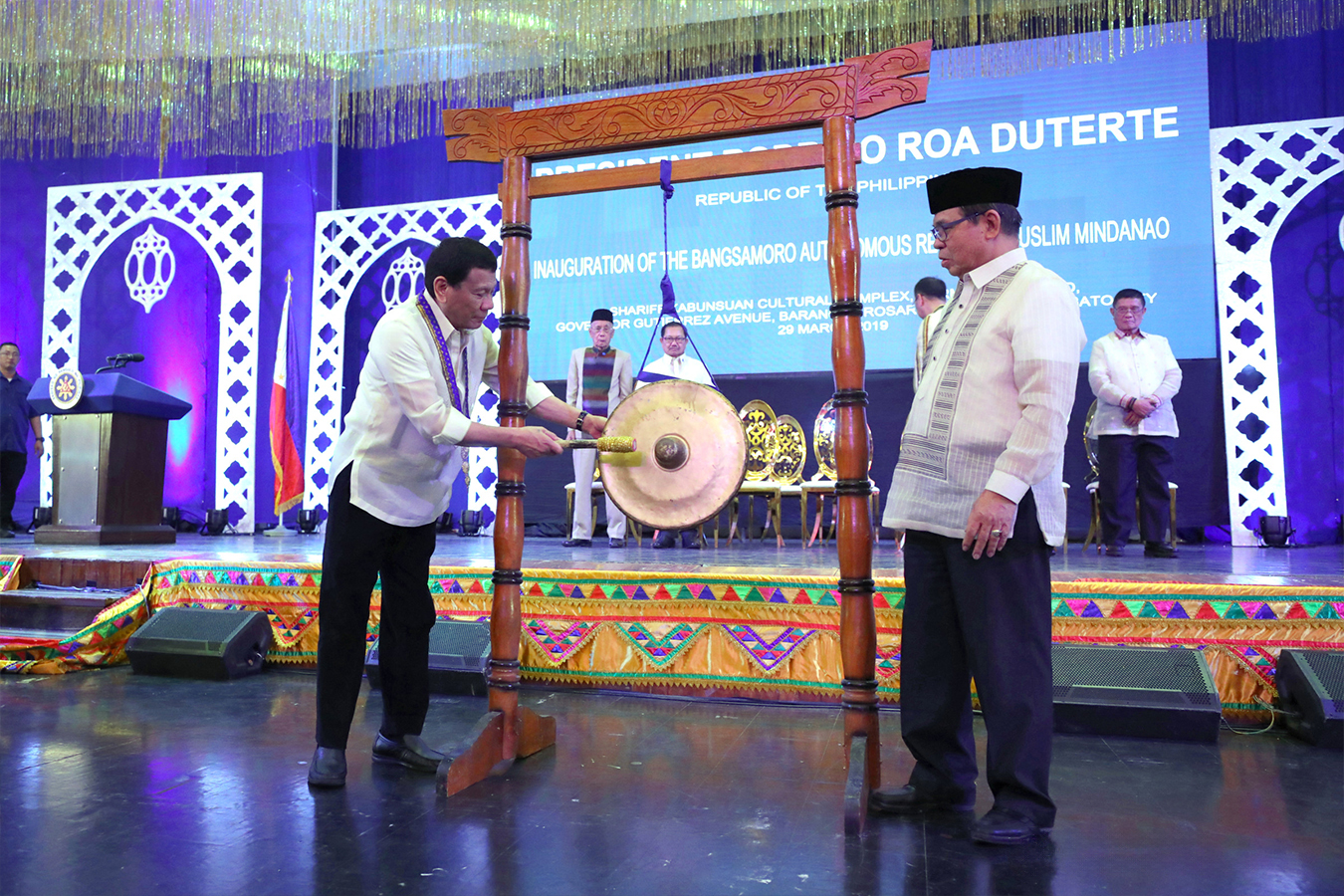
President Rodrigo Duterte rings the agong with interim Chief Minister Murad Ebrahim nearby as part of the inauguration of the Bangsamoro region.

The Bangsamoro transition period was the transition of the now-defunct Autonomous Region in Muslim Mindanao (ARMM) into the Bangsamoro Autonomous Region in Muslim Mindanao (BARMM), which lasted seven years and nine months. It began when the Bangsamoro Organic Law was ratified in a two-part plebiscite held in January and February 2019. It ended on October 30, 2026, upon the dissolution of the Bangsamoro Transition Authority (BTA) following the September 2026 Bangsamoro Parliament election and the election and qualification of Chief Minister Abdulraof Macacua.

== Background ==
The BARMM was created after residents of the then-existing ARMM voted to ratify the Bangsamoro Organic Law in January 2019. Cotabato City and 67 barangays in Cotabato province also voted to join Bangsamoro in the second part of the plebiscite in February 2019.

The initial members of the Bangsamoro Transition Authority (BTA) were sworn in by President Rodrigo Duterte on February 22, 2019, and the ARMM was officially turned over to the BARMM on February 26, 2019. The BARMM was inaugurated almost a month later on March 29, 2019, when the BTA, as the interim Bangsamoro Parliament, also held its first session. The Bangsamoro transition plan was then adopted by the Bangsamoro Parliament on June 18, 2019.

The transition work was hampered by financial constraints with members of the BTA only receiving their salaries on the first week of July 2019. By that time, the BTA is still negotiating for a transition fund from the Department of Budget and Management and the slow transition work has led to President Rodrigo Duterte appointing Manny Piñol who resigned from his post as Agriculture secretary as a point man for the national government in dealing with the Bangsamoro regional government.

The impact of the COVID-19 pandemic in the region has also impacted the work of the transition period which was originally scheduled to end on June 30, 2022. The pandemic was cited as one reason for the non-passage of a Bangsamoro Electoral Code leading the Bangsamoro regional government to lobbying the national government to postpone the first regular elections in the region. The campaign was successful after President Rodrigo Duterte signed a law on October 28, 2021 postponing the elections, and consequentially the end of the transition period, to 2025. The transition was extended again in 2026 when President Bongbong Marcos signed Republic Act No. 12317 which reset the first regular election for the Bangsamoro government to the second Monday of September 2026 (September 14) and provided for the continuation of the Bangsamoro Transition Authority during the extension.

== Transition plan and priority laws ==
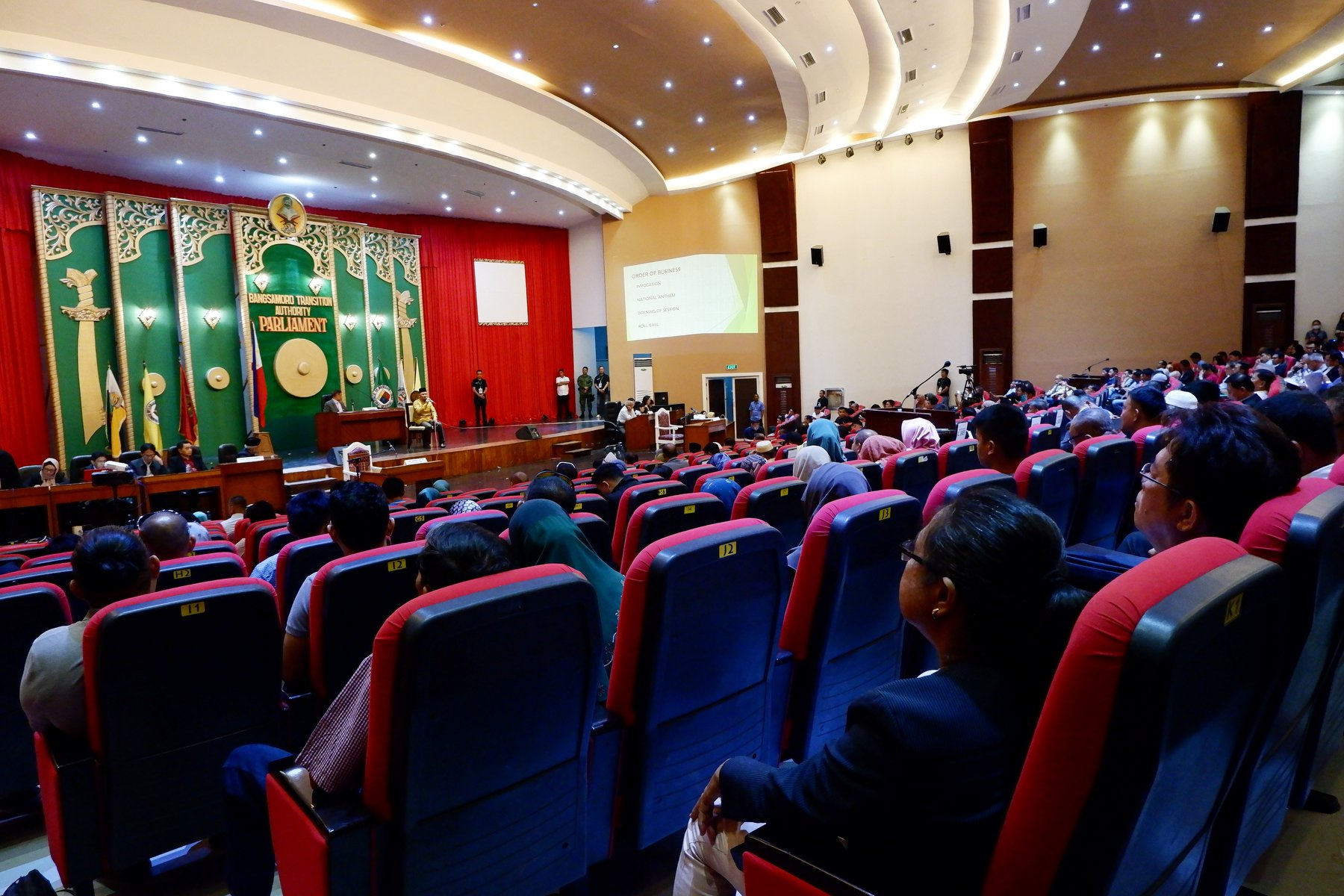
The Bangsamoro Parliament convenes.

During the transition period, the Bangsamoro Transition Authority as the interim parliament had obligations to complete.

=== Transition plan ===
The Bangsamoro Organic Law mandates interim Chief Minister Murad Ebrahim to submit to the BTA within the first 60 days of the transition period a transition plan containing the Bangsamoro government's "proposed organizational plan, as well as, the schedule for implementation therefor." It also requires the approval or action of the BTA on the proposed plan within 10 days upon its submission. If there is failure to act upon the plan within 10 days, the plan would be automatically approved and implemented within 15 days. According to Murad the start of the transition period for the purpose of submitting the transition plan was on March 29, or the inaugural session of the interim parliament. The plan's deadline is stated to be in May 2018.

The transition plan was then submitted to the Bangsamoro Parliament on June 17, 2019, and was approved by the legislature the following day.

=== Priority laws ===
The BTA as the interim Bangsamoro parliament is also required to pass into law "priority legislation" enumerated in the Bangsamoro Organic Law. Following the fourth session of the parliament, eight ad hoc committees were formed to draft the priority legislations. These committees were eventually dissolved and by August 2019, the interim Cabinet are working on the drafts instead. These drafts are still to be reviewed for adoption by the parliament.

The first three of the six priority codes; namely the Administrative, Civil Service, and Local Government Codes were filed before the Bangsamoro Parliament on July 22, 2020 while the Education Code was filed on October 28, 2020.

The Administrative Code was the first to be approved by the Parliament. The code as proposed under Cabinet Bill No. 60 was passed on October 28, 2020 and was signed into law by Chief Minister Murad Ebrahim on November 5, 2020. The Civil Service Code was passed by the Parliament and was signed into law on February 24, 2021. The Education Code became law on May 18, 2021. The Electoral Code became law on March 9, 2023. The Local Government Code became law on September 28, 2023.

Code	Legislation No.	Status
Bangsamoro Administrative Code	Bangsamoro Autonomy Act No. 13	Approved and signed into law
Bangsamoro Internal Revenue Code	—N/a	To be legislated
Bangsamoro Civil Service Code	Bangsamoro Autonomy Act No. 17	Approved and signed into law
Bangsamoro Electoral Code	Bangsamoro Autonomy Act No. 35	Approved and signed into law
Bangsamoro Local Government Code	Bangsamoro Autonomy Act No. 49	Approved and signed into law
Bangsamoro Education Code	Bangsamoro Autonomy Act No. 18	Approved and signed into law

== Inter-governmental relations bodies ==
The Bangsamoro Organic Law provides for the creation of Inter-governmental relations bodies (IGR) which would facilitate inter-governmental relations between the Bangsamoro regional government and the Philippine national government. Five IGRs including the National Government-Bangsamoro Government Intergovernmental Relations Body has been constituted as of September 2020.

Inter-governmental relations body	Foundation or First meeting
National Government-Bangsamoro Government Intergovernmental Relations Body	December 16, 2020
Intergovernmental Fiscal Policy Board	May 29, 2020
Intergovernmental Infrastructure Development Board	Constituted (First meeting to be held in October 2020)
Joint Body for the Zones of Joint Cooperation	June 26, 2020
Intergovernmental Energy Board	Constituted
Philippine Congress-Bangsamoro Parliament Forum	To be constituted
Council of Leaders	January 18, 2021
Bangsamoro Sustainable Development Board	To be constituted

== Reorganization of government agencies ==
=== Ministries ===
When the ARMM was succeeded by the Bangsamoro Autonomous Region in Muslim Mindanao (BARMM) in 2019, the regional departments of the former Autonomous Region in Muslim Mindanao were reconfigured into ministries of Bangsamoro.

Preceding agency or agencies (ARMM regional office unless otherwise stated)	Ministry
Department of Agriculture, Department of Agrarian Reform	Ministry of Agriculture, Fisheries and Agrarian Reform
Department of Education, Commission on Higher Education, Technical Education and Skills Development Authority	Ministry of Basic, Higher and Technical Education
Department of Environment and Natural Resources, Department of Energy	Ministry of Environment, Natural Resources and Energy
Department of Health	Ministry of Health
Department of Public Works and Highways	Ministry of Public Works

=== Bangsamoro police ===
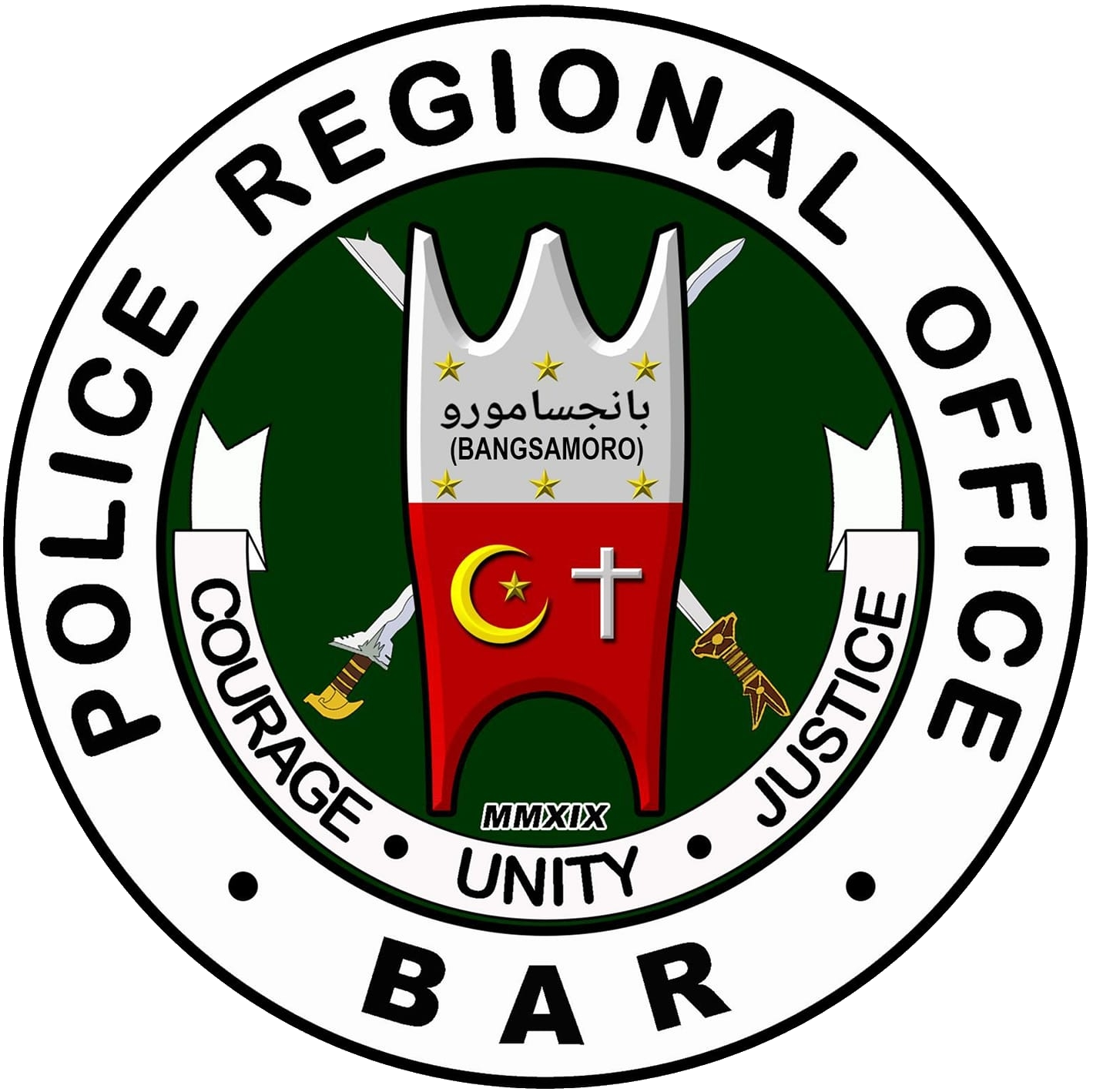
PRO BAR insignia

The Police Regional Office Autonomous Region in Muslim Mindanao (PRO ARMM) of the Philippine National Police (PNP) was organized sometime in 2019 as the Police Regional Office Bangsamoro Autonomous Region (PRO BAR). Since the Bangsamoro autonomous region had a slightly larger scope than its predecessor, the new police regional office had to expand its jurisdiction as well. They were previous proposals to create an independent police force for the region, but did not materialize.

By April 2019, the PRO BARMM had started its gradual takeover of additional areas. They started supervising the Cotabato City Police which is still administratively under the control of Police Regional Office 12. They also began planning on how to put the barangays in Cotabato that are part of Bangsamoro under their jurisdiction.

An agreement was signed on July 5, 2019, that would allow former fighters of the Moro Islamic Liberation Front (MILF) and Moro National Liberation Front (MNLF) rebel groups to join the PNP with age, height, and education requirements waived. However applicants through this process must attain the necessary educational requirements within 15 years after joining the police force.

The integration progress began in April 2022 when the Bangsamoro government signed an agreement with the National Police Commission (Napolcom) regarding the Special Qualifying Eligibility Examination for ex-MILF and MNLF members.

== Integration of local government units ==
=== Barangays in Cotabato province ===
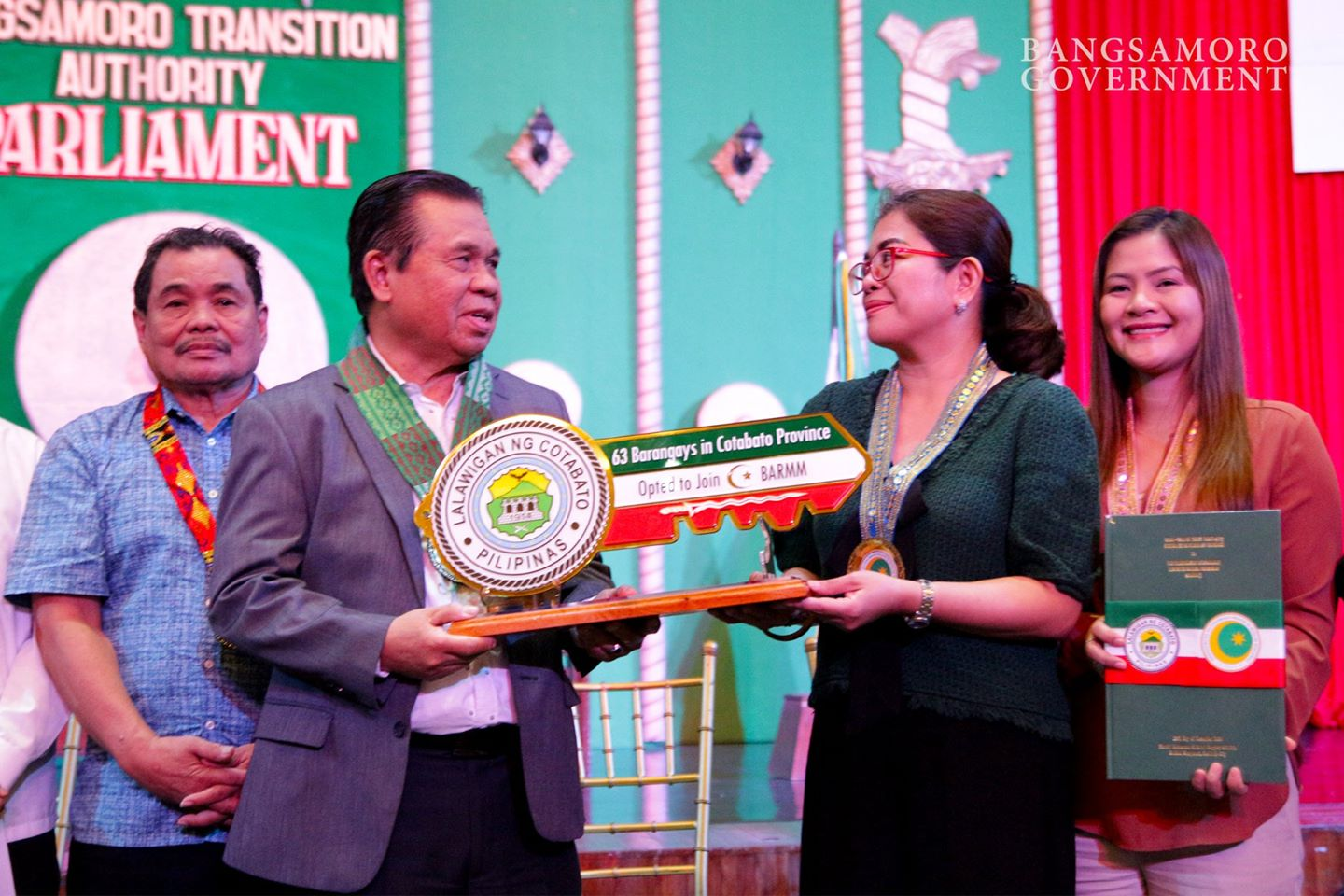
Turnover ceremony of the 63 barangays in Cotabato to the BARMM. November 20, 2019.

Upon the effective foundation of the new Bangsamoro autonomous region, the 63 barangays in Cotabato province which voted to become part of Bangsamoro remained part of their parent municipalities. Their residents voted for municipal officials of their parent municipalities and Cotabato provincial officials in the 2019 Philippine general election. The barangays could be reorganized into one or more municipalities or merged with any of the neighboring municipalities of Maguindanao.

These barangays were still not under the effective control of Bangsamoro as of July 2019 since they were not yet officially turned over to Bangsamoro regional government which was initially set to occur once a local government code is passed by the Bangsamoro Parliament.

With the local government code still pending, the official turnover took place on November 20, 2019. The Sangguniang Panlalawigan of Cotabato passed a resolution concerning the transfer. Amidst budgetary concerns, the barangays were assured that they will still receive their Internal Revenue Allocation directly from the Department of Budget and Management after the transfer takes place. The Bangsamoro government later administered the 63 barangays through interim area clusters pursuant to BARMM Executive Order No. 001, Series of 2020. After the 2024 plebiscites that ratified the creation of eight municipalities from the barangays, the Philippine Statistics Authority updated the Philippine Standard Geographic Code to change the interim province name to Special Geographic Area.

=== Cotabato City ===
The formal turnover of Cotabato City to the Bangsamoro regional government has met opposition from Cotabato City mayor Cynthia Guiani-Sayadi. Cotabato City voted in favor of its inclusion to the Bangsamoro region in the 2019 plebiscite but Sayadi had expressed intent to file electoral protest claiming irregularities in the conduct of the plebiscite in here city. A resident filed a protest. The Bangsamoro regional government has pushed for the formal turnover of Cotabato City to the region as soon as possible while Mayor Sayadi has formally requested President Rodrigo Duterte to defer the transfer of the city to Bangsamoro until June 30, 2022, when it is expected that the "BARMM bureaucracy would have been fully operational" or the original formal end of the transition period. Sayadi was informed that the Department of Interior and Local Government has deferred the transfer to at least December 2020.

The formal turnover of Cotabato City to the Bangsamoro regional government took place on December 15, 2020. The turnover was scheduled after President Rodrigo Duterte had decided to follow the agreement with the Bangsamoro regional government.

Shortly prior to the turnover, Cotabato City Mayor Sayadi alleged that she has received death threats which she cited as the reason her non-attendance to the turnover ceremony. One sender reportedly threatened the lives who openly rejected the integration of the city to Bangsamoro, and another warned that they would bomb the city. Bangsamoro Interior Minister and spokesperson Naguib Sinarimbo, in response under the assumption that the MILF is being alleged as behind the threats, said that the rebel group has nothing to gain from issuing threats given that Cotabato City has voted for its inclusion to the Bangsamoro region. Bangsamoro Chief Minister Murad Ebrahim has called for an investigation regarding the matter.

== Decommissioning of the MILF ==
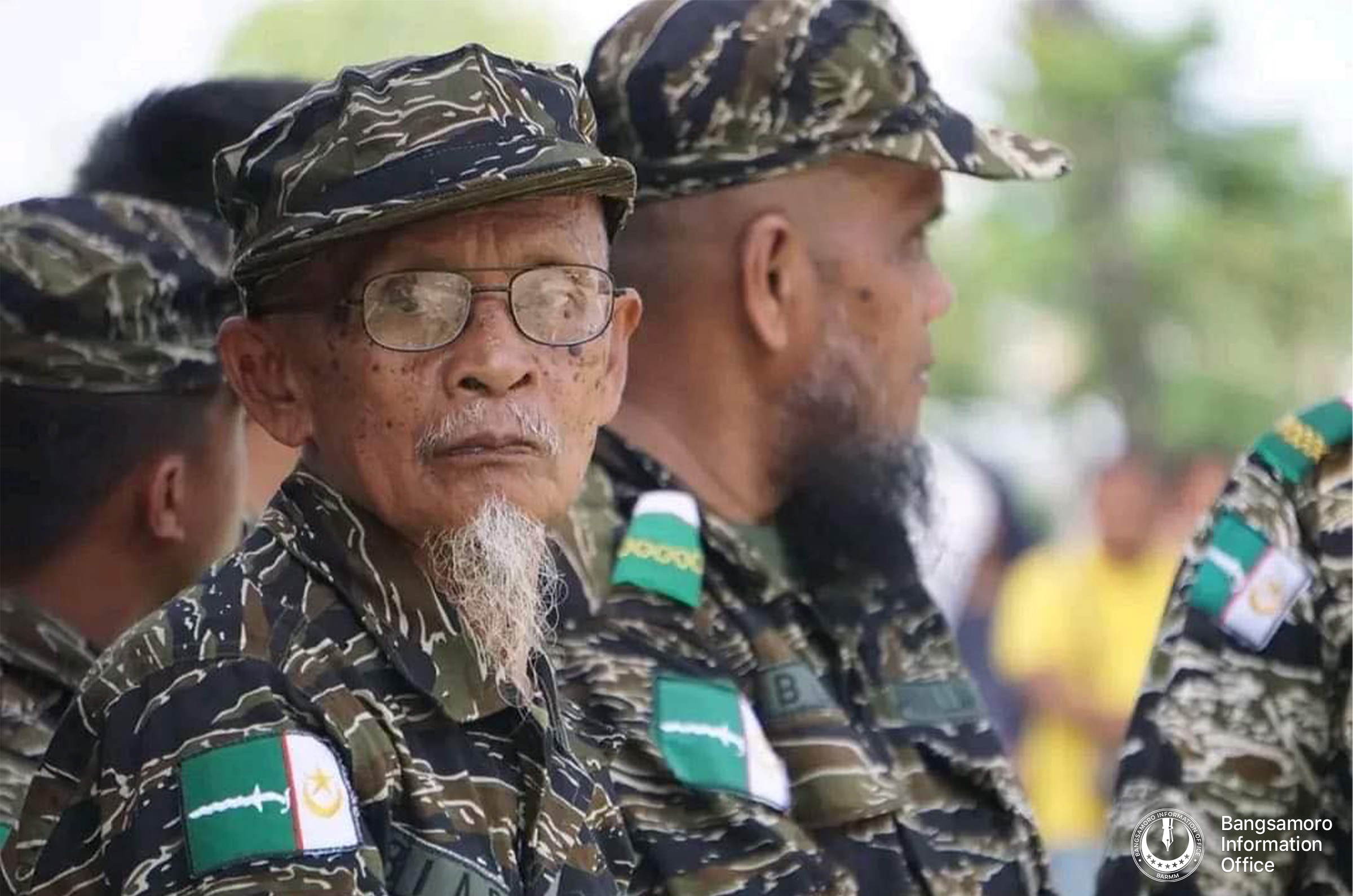
A MILF fighter.

Under the Comprehensive Agreement on the Bangsamoro signed between the Moro Islamic Liberation Front (MILF) and the Philippine national government in 2014, the rebel group would start to decommission its forces once the Bangsamoro autonomous region is set up. The decommissioning process is to be oversaw by the Independent Decommissioning Body in coordination with the Joint Normalization Committee and the Task Force for Decommissioned Combatants. The MILF started the first phase of the process when it submitted a list of its weapons and combatants for decommissioning to the government. The list accounts for 12,000 militants or a third of the MILF's forces.

The MILF will field candidates in the 2022 local elections through its political wing, the United Bangsamoro Justice Party.

== Government employees ==
By December 2019, about 5,000 government employees of the former Autonomous Region in Muslim Mindanao lost their jobs. Under the Bangsamoro Organic Law, workers hired on a permanent, temporary, casual or contractual basis and with appointments attested by the Civil Service Commission were entitled to certain retirement or separation benefits. Employees working in the education, health, and social welfare sectors, which are deemed as significant sectors were absorbed by the Bangsamoro government.

== Timeline ==
- January 21, 2019 – First part of the Bangsamoro autonomy plebiscite where voters voted on the ratification of the Bangsamoro Organic Law.
- January 25, 2019 – The Commission on Elections announced that the Bangsamoro Organic Law is "deemed" ratified.
- February 6, 2019 – Second part of the Bangsamoro autonomy plebiscite to determined potential additional areas for the then-proposed Bangsamoro autonomous region.
- February 22, 2019 – First set of members of the Bangsamororo Transition Authority took oath. including first and interim Chief Minister, Murad Ebrahim.
- February 26, 2019 – Official turnover of the Autonomous Region in Muslim Mindanao to the Bangsamoro Autonomous Region in Muslim Mindanao.
- March 29, 2019 – Inauguration of the new Bangsamoro regional government., first ever session of the Bangsamoro Parliament. and appointment of Khalipa Usman Nando as first Wali of Bangsamoro.
- June 18, 2019 – Bangsamoro transition plan approved by the Bangsamoro Parliament.
- November 20, 2019 – Formal turnover of the 63 barangays in Cotabato to the Bangsamoro regional government.
- December 16, 2019 – National Government-Bangsamoro Government Intergovernmental Relations Body held its first meeting.
- December 15, 2020 – Formal turnover of Cotabato City to the Bangsamoro regional government.
- June 30, 2025 – Originally-scheduled last day of the Bangsamoro transition period following the first extension of the BTA.
- September 14, 2026 – First Bangsamoro Parliament election
- October 30, 2026 – Schedule start of the term of office of the officials first elected in the first election.

== Comparisons ==
Body	Autonomous Region in Muslim Mindanao	Bangsamoro Autonomous Region in Muslim Mindanao	Republic of the Philippines (National government only)
Constitutional document	ARMM Organic Act (Republic Act No. 6734)	Organic Law for the Bangsamoro Autonomous Region (Republic Act No. 11054)	Constitution of the Philippines
Head of the region or territory	Regional Governor of the ARMM	Wali of Bangsamoro	President of the Philippines
Head of government	Regional Governor of the ARMM	Chief Minister of Bangsamoro	President of the Philippines
Executive	Executive departments of the ARMM	Bangsamoro Cabinet	Executive departments of the Philippines
Legislative	Regional Legislative Assembly	Bangsamoro Parliament	Bicameral Congress (Senate and House of Representatives)
Judiciary	None (under Supreme Court)	Bangsamoro Shari'ah court system (ultimately under Supreme Court)	Supreme Court
Legal Supervisory or Prosecution	None (under Philippine government)	Planned (before 2016)	Department of Justice (DOJ)
Police Force(s)	Police Regional Office Autonomous Region in Muslim Mindanao (PRO ARMM) (under the Philippine National Police)	Police Regional Office Bangsamoro Autonomous Region (PRO BAR) (under the PNP)	Philippine National Police (PNP)
Shariah law	Yes, for Muslims only		"Code of Muslim Personal Laws of the Philippines" issued in 1977 under Presidential Decree No. 1083
