= COVID-19 pandemic in Bangsamoro =

Ongoing COVID-19 viral pandemic in Bangsamoro, Philippines

- Disease: COVID-19
- Pathogen: SARS-CoV-2
- Location: Bangsamoro
- First outbreak: Wuhan, Hubei, China
- Index case: Lanao del Sur
- Arrival date: March 11, 2020 (6 years, 2 months and 6 days)
- Confirmed cases: 27,745
- Recovered: 26,931
- Deaths: 595

Government website
- covid19.bangsamoro.gov.ph

The COVID-19 pandemic in Bangsamoro is part of the worldwide pandemic of coronavirus disease 2019 (COVID-19) caused by severe acute respiratory syndrome coronavirus 2 (SARS-CoV-2). The virus reached the Bangsamoro Autonomous Region in Muslim Mindanao on March 11, 2020, when the first case of the disease was confirmed in Lanao del Sur. Cases has been confirmed in Lanao del Sur, Maguindanao, and the independent city of Cotabato.

== Timeline ==
The first overall COVID-19 case in Mindanao is a resident of Lanao del Sur who went home from San Juan, Metro Manila. The case was that of a 54-year-old man who was admitted at the Adventist Medical Center in his home province and was referred to the Northern Mindanao Medical Center on March 8, a health facility outside the region in Cagayan de Oro after he is suspected to have COVID-19. The case was confirmed on March 11. The man had no known travel history abroad and was suspected to have contracted the disease while he was in Metro Manila. The patient died on March 13 becoming the first COVID-19 death outside Metro Manila.

From March 26 to April 1, three cases were confirmed in Cotabato City which is linked to a cockfighting derby in Matina, Davao City. The first case in Maguindanao which was confirmed on April 6 is also linked to the Matina cluster. The Matina cluster accounts for at least 40 other confirmed COVID-19 cases in Mindanao as of April 22.

A leaked advisory from the Bangsamoro regional government dated April 1, listed Lanao del Sur and Marawi as one of the areas in the whole country to "with local transmission/under enhanced community quarantine". The region's Ministry of Health later issued a clarification that the document is still unofficial and not final and dispelled rumors arising from the leak that the two localities have already have local transmission of COVID-19.

No additional cases in the region, not accounting for Cotabato City, were reported after the first case in Maguindanao was confirmed. The region recorded an additional case on April 18 bringing the total COVID-19 cases in the region excluding Cotabato City to nine cases.

Sulu is the first among the three island provinces of Bangsamoro to confirm a COVID-19 case. The province confirmed its first case on May 1, that of a 63-year-old male in Indanan who died on April 19. Basilan recorded its first case on May 27, when a Tipo-Tipo resident tested positive for COVID-19 who was referred to a hospital in Zamboanga City. Tawi Tawi recorded its first case on July 5, that of a 44 year old police officer from Bongao. He is a locally stranded individual who returned to the province from Quezon City by transiting through Zamboanga City and Basilan.

In October 2020, Lanao del Sur, including Marawi, were under modified enhanced community quarantine; the highest level of community quarantine imposed in the Philippines at the time.

== Impact ==
The COVID-19 pandemic has caused a delay on the Bangsamoro transition process due to suspension of the Bangsamoro Parliament which is tasked to legislate priority codes, the region's Administrative, Revenue, Electoral, Local Government, and Educational Code.

Class participation rates in the region declined due to the pandemic. On the official first day of classes for the 2020–21 school year on October 5, 2020, it was reported that Bangsamoro had a class participation rate of 70 percent across both public and private schools in the region.

== Response ==
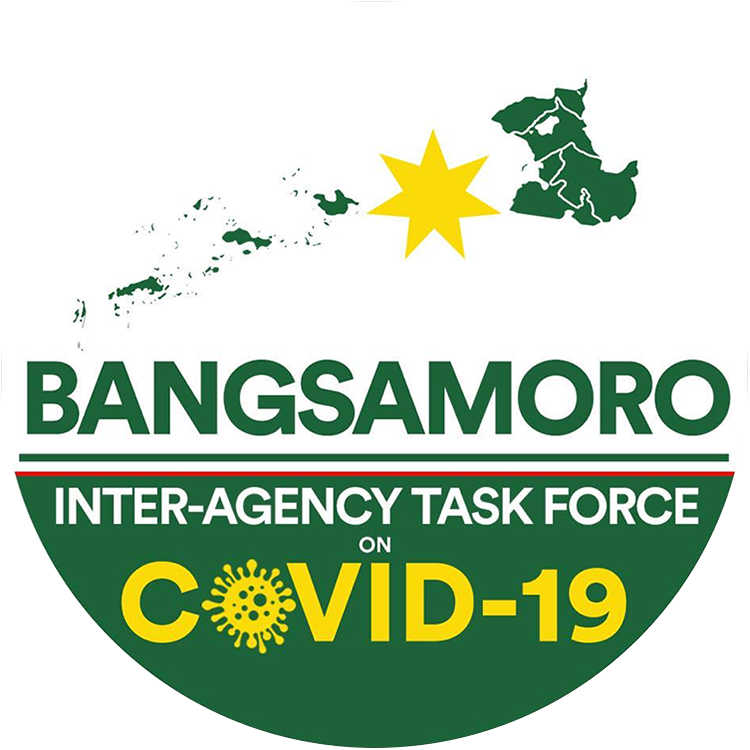
Logo of the Bangsamoro IATF on COVID-19.

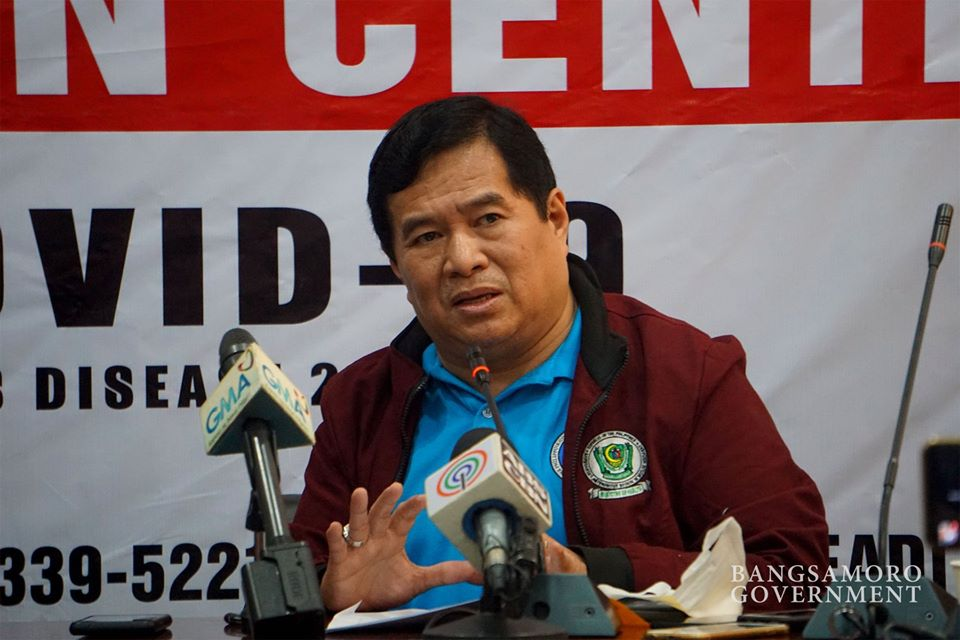
BARMM Minister of Health Saffrulah Dipatuan speaks on March 31, 2020, on plans to convert hospitals in BARMM into COVID-19 dedicated health facilities.

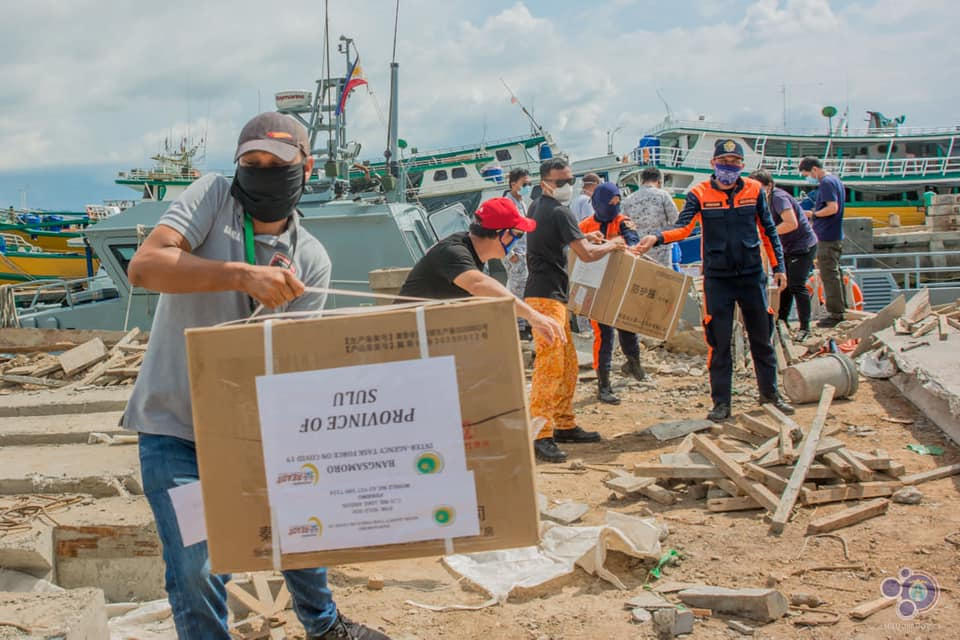
Medical supplies being delivered to Sulu by the Philippine Navy.

The Inter-Agency Task Force for the Management of Emerging Infectious Diseases (IATF-EID) of the Philippine national government in April 2020, has appointed Bangsamoro Chief Minister Murad Ebrahim to lead the regional inter-agency task group for Bangsamoro. The Bangsamoro regional government has allotted at least ₱1.9 billion for its response against the COVID-19 pandemic in the region. The regional government allocated ₱155 million to its local government units. The aid allocated to the Cotabato City was not received due to its city government not submitting the pertinent documents.

In March 2020, Lanao del Sur and Marawi were placed under enhanced community quarantine (ECQ). Tawi Tawi and Cotabato City were likewise placed under ECQ by April 2020. The whole of Bangsamoro transitioned to a general community quarantine on May 1 with request to extend ECQ imposition in Lanao del Sur and Marawi rejected by the national IATF-IED.

=== Hospital equipment ===
There were only three ventilators in the whole Bangsamoro region as of April 2020, all of which are used by the Maguindanao Provincial Hospital. Through the United Nations Development Programme an additional of at least 15 ventilators are being installed in health facilities across the region.

As of early June 2020, the region already has 19 mechanical ventilators.

=== Testing and quarantine facilities ===
The Cotabato Regional Medical Center in Cotabato City has a reverse transcription-polymerase chain reaction (RT-PCR) testing facility which test suspected COVID-19 cases in the Bangsamoro and Soccsksargen regions. The Bangsamoro regional government has provided ₱14 million aid to the hospital to fund the upgrade of its laboratory and training of its staff. The hospital received accreditation to conduct test in May 2020.

The Bangsamoro region's Ministry of Health and Ministry of Public Works has constructed a 100-bed capacity COVID-19 isolation facility near the Cotabato Sanitarium Hospital in Sultan Kudarat, Maguindanao. Another facility is being set up in Datu Blah Sinsuat Hospital

The capacity of the region's isolation facilities across all of its five provinces is 4,360 beds.

=== Parliament sessions ===
When the Bangsamoro Parliament resumed its session on June 16, 2020, some of its members participated via video conferencing and those who were physically present wore masks and observed social distancing by seating two seats apart from each other.

=== Religious sector ===
Muslim worship in the region has been affected by the pandemic. The Regional Darul Ifta' of Bangsamoro has suspended all congregational prayers in the Bangsamoro region from March 19 to April 10, 2020. The Islamic advisory body has also issued a fatwa further suspending congregational prayers in mosques during the whole Ramadan period and has advised Muslims to hold Taraweeh prayers in their residences. The Darul Ifta' released another advisory clarifying that congregational prayers are still suspended even as the whole Bangsamoro region was placed under general community quarantine starting May 1. The suspension on congregational prayers were provisionally lifted from June 1 to 15, provided that mosques will be used 50 percent of its capacity at most per prayer session.
