= Zones of Joint Cooperation (Mindanao) =

- Location within Mindanao Location within Philippines Location within Southeast Asia
- Location: Sulu Sea and Moro Gulf of Celebes Sea
- Coordinates: 8°N 120°E; 6°51′N 123°00′E
- Basin countries: Philippines

The Zones of Joint Cooperation refers to a proposed non-contiguous areas covering much of the Sulu Sea and Moro Gulf ( part of Celebes Sea ) to be managed by both the autonomous regional government of Bangsamoro and the national government of the Philippines. The existence of the maritime area is mandated by the Bangsamoro Organic Law, the charter legislation of Bangsamoro. The area is distinct from the Bangsamoro waters and is not part of the territorial jurisdiction of Bangsamoro.

The area as per law is to be managed by an ad hoc body composed of representatives of the Department of Environment and Natural Resources and the National Mapping and Resource Information Authority of the national government and representatives from "appropriate agencies" of the Bangsamoro regional government.

The Bangsamoro Parliament passed a resolution on July 31, 2019 urging for the establishment of such ad hoc body. The National Government-Bangsamoro Government Intergovernmental Relations Body convened online in mid-2020 regarding the set up of inter-government bodies including the Joint Body for the Zones of Joint Cooperation.

== See also ==
- Exclusive economic zone of the Philippines
