= Saffrullah Dipatuan =

Filipino politician, doctor and civil leader

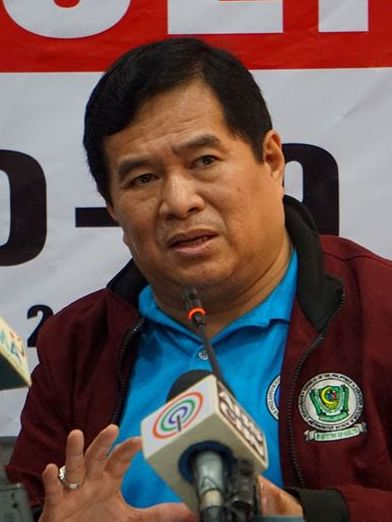
- Dipatuan in 2020

Member of the Bangsamoro Transition Authority Parliament
- In office 29 March 2019 – August 12, 2022
- Appointed by: Rodrigo Duterte
- Chief Minister: Murad Ebrahim

Bangsamoro Minister of Health
- In office 26 February 2019 – 2020
- Succeeded by: Bashary Latiph

Personal details
- Citizenship: Filipino
- Education: Far Eastern University; Philippine Muslim-Christian College Of Medicine Foundation; Mindanao State University; Southwestern University
- Occupation: Doctor, civic leader

Saffrullah Dipatuan is a Filipino politician, doctor, and civic leader who was a member of the Bangsamoro Transition Authority Parliament and chair of the parliament's Committee on Health. He formerly also headed the Bangsamoro Ministry of Health.

== Early career ==
Dipatuan was a civic-leader based in Marawi catering to displaced people in Central Mindanao during the Moro conflict.

== Bangsamoro Development Agency ==
Dipatuan was the chair of the Bangsamoro Development Agency which crafted the Bangsamoro Development Plan prior to the establishment of the Bangsamoro autonomous region. He is a member of the Philippine Medical Association and the Lanao del Sur Medical Society and also served as the medical director of the SMD General Hospital in Marawi. He also headed the SMD Foundation, Inc., a charity organization established in honor of philanthropist Sheikh Macapantao Dipatuan.

== Minister of Health of the Bangsamoro ==
Dipatuan was appointed as the first minister of Bangsamoro Ministry of Health on February 26, 2019 by the region's interim Chief Minister Murad Ebrahim. As minister, he launched a polio immunization program for the region's youth and oversaw the regional government's response to the COVID-19 pandemic. Dipatuan himself contracted COVID-19 although he was asymptomatic.

By late 2020, Dipatuan was succeeded by Ameril Usman who took over the ministry as an Officer in Charge. Usman in turn was succeeded by Bashary Latiph who became the new regular Health Minister on March 31, 2021.

== Minister of the Bangsamoro Parliament ==
As a member of the Bangsamoro Transition Authority, Dipatuan became part of the Bangsamoro Transition Authority Parliament when it was established in 2019. His term, along with the rest of the BTA Parliament, was extended in 2022 when the first BARMM elections to 2025 due to complications brought about by the COVID-19 pandemic in Bangsamoro.

When President Bongbong Marcos appointed a new set of members for the BTA in August 2022, Dipatuan was not among the reappointees.
