= COVID-19 pandemic in Soccsksargen =

Ongoing COVID-19 viral pandemic in Soccsksargen, Philippines

- Disease: COVID-19
- Pathogen: SARS-CoV-2
- Location: Soccsksargen
- First outbreak: Wuhan, Hubei, China
- Index case: Cotabato City (City part of Bangsamoro; as per DOH Region 12 records)
- Arrival date: March 11, 2020 (6 years, 5 months and 3 weeks)
- Confirmed cases: 83,050
- Recovered: 81,189
- Deaths: 1,327

Government website
- ro12.doh.gov.ph

The COVID-19 pandemic in Soccsksargen is part of the worldwide pandemic of coronavirus disease 2019 (COVID-19) caused by severe acute respiratory syndrome coronavirus 2 (SARS-CoV-2). The virus reached Soccsksargen on March 17, 2020, when the first case of the disease was confirmed in Cotabato City. The patient was officially recorded as the first case of the region. Cases has been confirmed in all component local government units of the region.

== Timeline ==
The first officially recorded case in Soccsksargen was patient number 145 who was confined at the Cotabato Regional and Medical Center in Cotabato City. The patient was a preacher who attended the Tablighi Jamaat religious event in Malaysia. The case was confirmed by the Soccsksargen field office of the Department of Health (DOH Region-12) on March 17. The region previously included cases in Cotabato City prior to its turnover to the Bangsamoro regional government.

The second confirmed case in the region was Sultan Kudarat province's first case which involved a man who died from respiratory disease on March 14. The patient was posthumously confirmed to have had COVID-19 infection.

South Cotabato announced that it has confirmed its first case on March 31.

Cotabato province announced its first case on April 6, that of a 46-year-old male who attended a cockfighting derby in Matina, Davao City A day later, the city of General Santos reported its first case, also an attendee of the event in Davao City.

COVID-19 has been confirmed to have spread to all component local government units in the region, with the confirmation of Sarangani's first case, that of a resident of Maitum, on May 18.

On the last week of August, there was a surge of a cases in South Cotabato, Sarangani and General Santos. More than 100 persons were tested positive throughout the SOCSARGEN area and most of the infected individuals were fish vendors or had a history travel to General Santos Fish Port. The RIATF then ordered the temporary shutdown of the fish port.

== Response ==
=== South Cotabato ===
The provincial government of South Cotabato, through the Balik Probinsya Program and the Provincial Tourism Office organized sweeper flights and sea vessels that brought home 8,938 Locally Stranded Individuals (LSI) and 1,860 Returning Overseas Filipinos (ROF) from Metro Manila, other cities and countries for a total of 10,798 as of August 27. Out of 1,632 repatriates as of June 13, 5 of them (0.3%) tested positive for COVID-19.

As part of safety protocols, the decontamination team of the province led by the Bureau of Fire Protection immediately geared up to conduct decontamination procedures upon the arrival of the returning residents who were stranded in different cities and provinces. The procedure is part of the measures to at least minimize or prevent the spread of COVID-19 in the province. LSIs and ROFs are then endorsed to their respective local government units for mandatory 14-day quarantine either at home or in LGU-designated facility.

South Cotabato was the first LGU in Soccsksargen to charter flights and sea vessels for its returning residents.

On September 16, South Cotabato was reverted to GCQ in response to a sudden spike in the number of cases throughout the province.
