= KCC Mall of Cotabato =

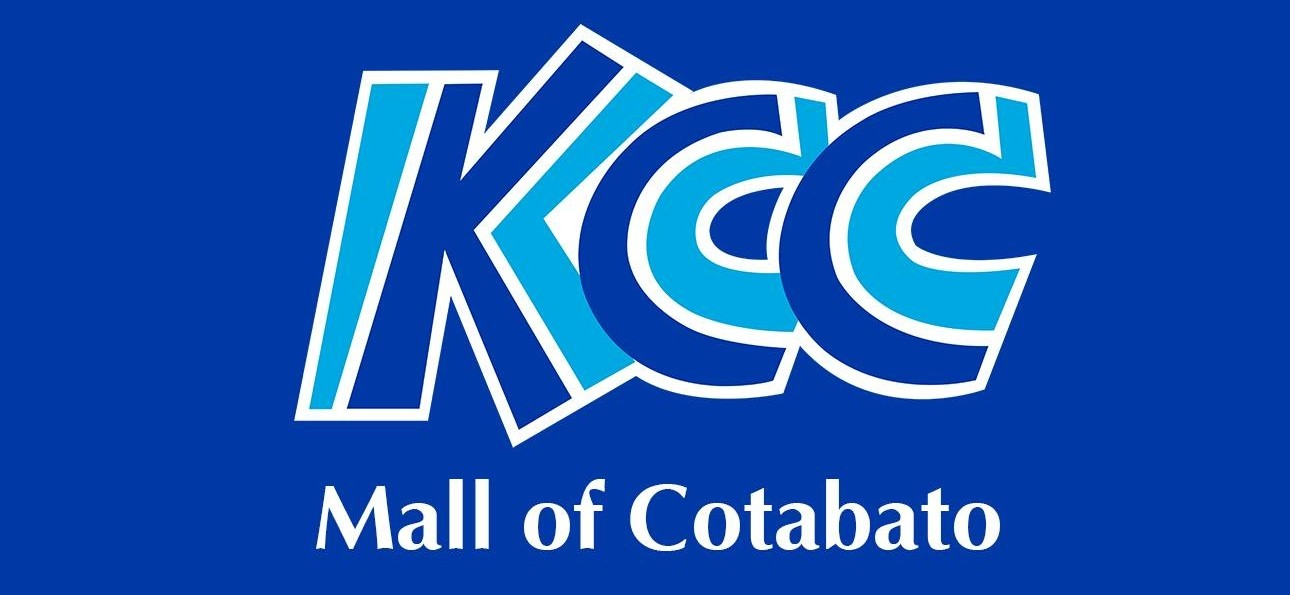

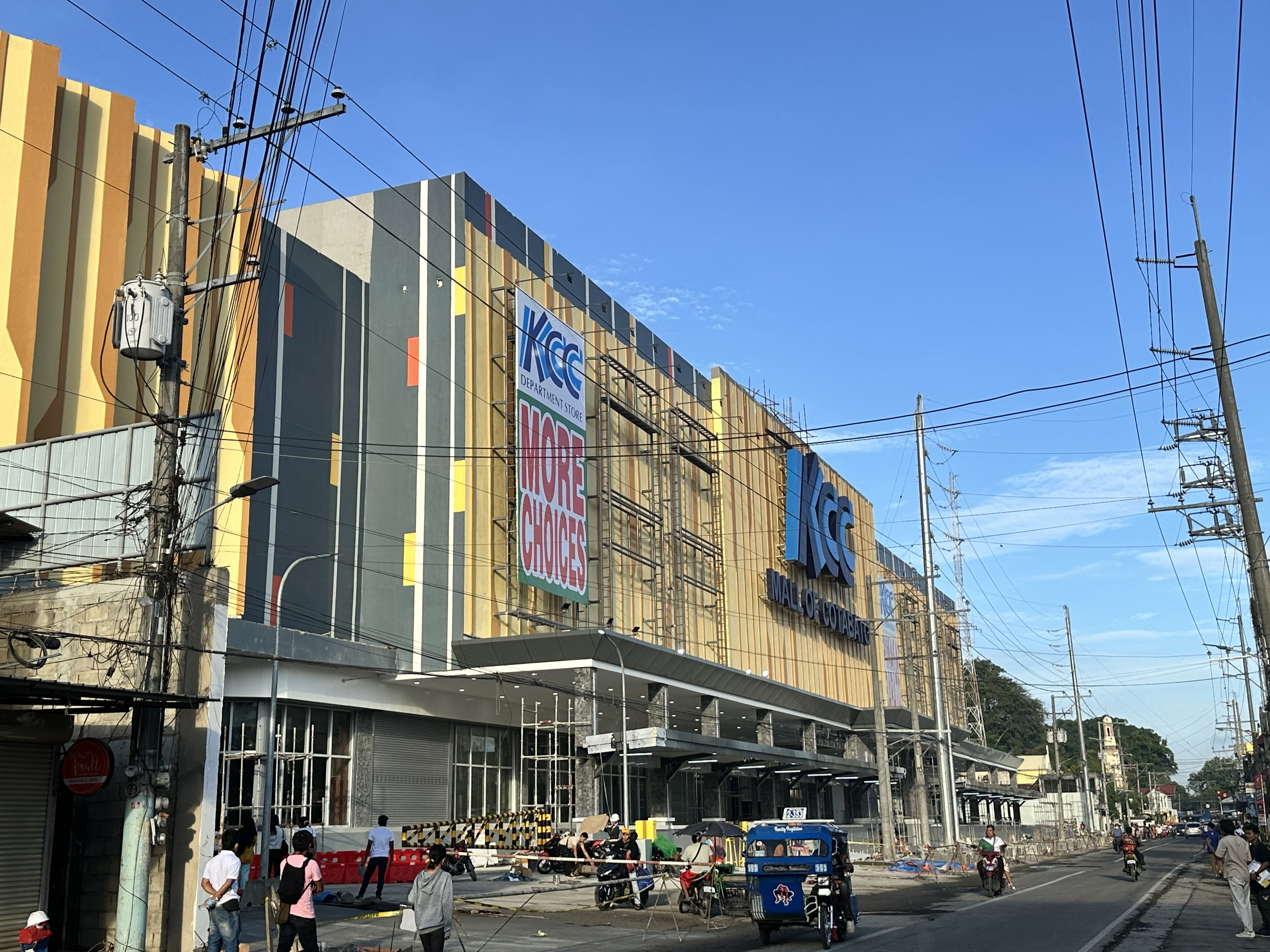
- Quezon Avenue entrance
- Location: Cotabato City, Philippines
- Coordinates: 7.220367812623804°N 124.24819499999998°E
- Address: 10 Quezon Avenue, Rosary Heights 2, Cotabato City
- Opened: April 2, 2025; 19 months ago
- Developer: KCC Malls, China State Construction Engineering Corporation
- Manager: KCC Malls
- Owner: TCKI
- Num. of stores: 500+
- Num. of anchor tenants: 8
- Floor area: 180,020 m^{2} (1,937,700 sq ft)
- Floors: 4 (Shopping Mall); 7 (Parking Area); 3 (Warehouse); 11 (Hotel, soon to rise)
- Parking: 1,200 (four-wheel vehicles); 1,600 (Motorcycles); Total = 2,800
- Public transit: Awang to Parang Road ORC to College via ND Avenue Ext Hiway to Super via Parang Road; College to Parang Road ORC to Parang Road; Cotabato Airport - Super Sinsuat Avenue Notre Dame Avenue Extension
- Website: KCC Malls

KCC Mall of Cotabato is a shopping mall owned by KCC Malls with a gross floor area of 180,020 m^{2} (1,937,700 sq ft). It is the largest KCC Mall in its 4 branches, and third largest mall in Mindanao, and the 24th largest mall in the Philippines. The four storey mall lies within a 6-hectares space in a 19 hectares commercial complex, additionally the Mall complex has an annex building for warehouse with 20,000 sqm floor area lies in a 3-hectare lot located along Jose Lim Senior Street. It is located along Sinsuat Avenue corner Quezon Avenue, Cotabato City, Bangsamoro Region, Philippines. The total investments to build the KCC Mall of Cotabato was 10 billion pesos.

== History ==
In 2016, clearing operations has already been ongoing for a future KCC Malls in Cotabato City.

The KCC Mall of Cotabato City had its groundbreaking ceremony on October 28, 2018, during the term of Mayor Cynthia Guiani-Sayadi. The residents of the area were relocated at a housing community known as Cynthia Village in Barangay Tamontaka II. Construction was temporarily halted for the conduct of the 2019 Philippine elections.

The mall was inaugurated on April 1, 2025, and was opened to the public the following day.

== Features ==
The mall anchors KCC Department Store, KCC Supermarket, Kainan sa KCC, KCC Home, KCC Pharmacy, KCC Events and Convention Center. The mall features eight state-of-the-art cinemas capable for 3D movies, including a Dolby Atmos Cinema (C5) and a VIP Cinema.

Cinema Featuring 6 regular cinema, 1 Dolby Atmos Cinema and 1 VIP Cinema with Lazy Boy Coach.

Cinema 1–4, 6-7: Regular Cinema Cinema 5: Dolby Atmos cinema Cinema 8: VIP a Directors Lounge with Lazy-boy Chairs

Convention and Events Center Largest convention center in Cotabato City with an area of 3,400 square meters that can accommodate of up to 4,300 audience or 1,800 seating capacity and 2,500 standing audience.

One of the recent artist performed in the Convention Center is the international singer David Pomeranz, P-Pop group BGYO, PBB Collab Kapamilya Housemates, PBB Collab 2.0 Kapamilya Housemates, Donny Pangilinan, and Belle Mariano.

== Gallery ==
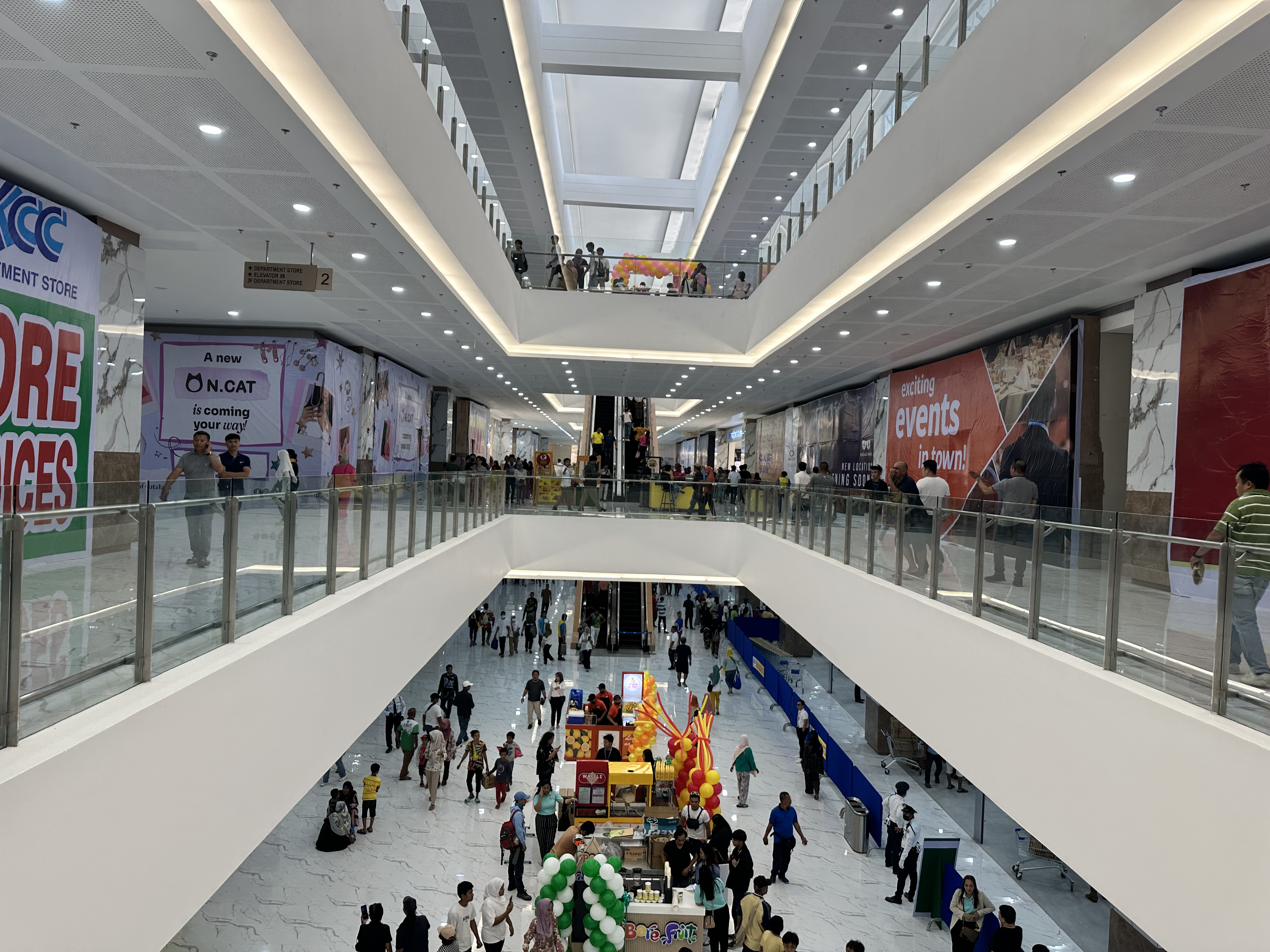
Scenic view of the mall

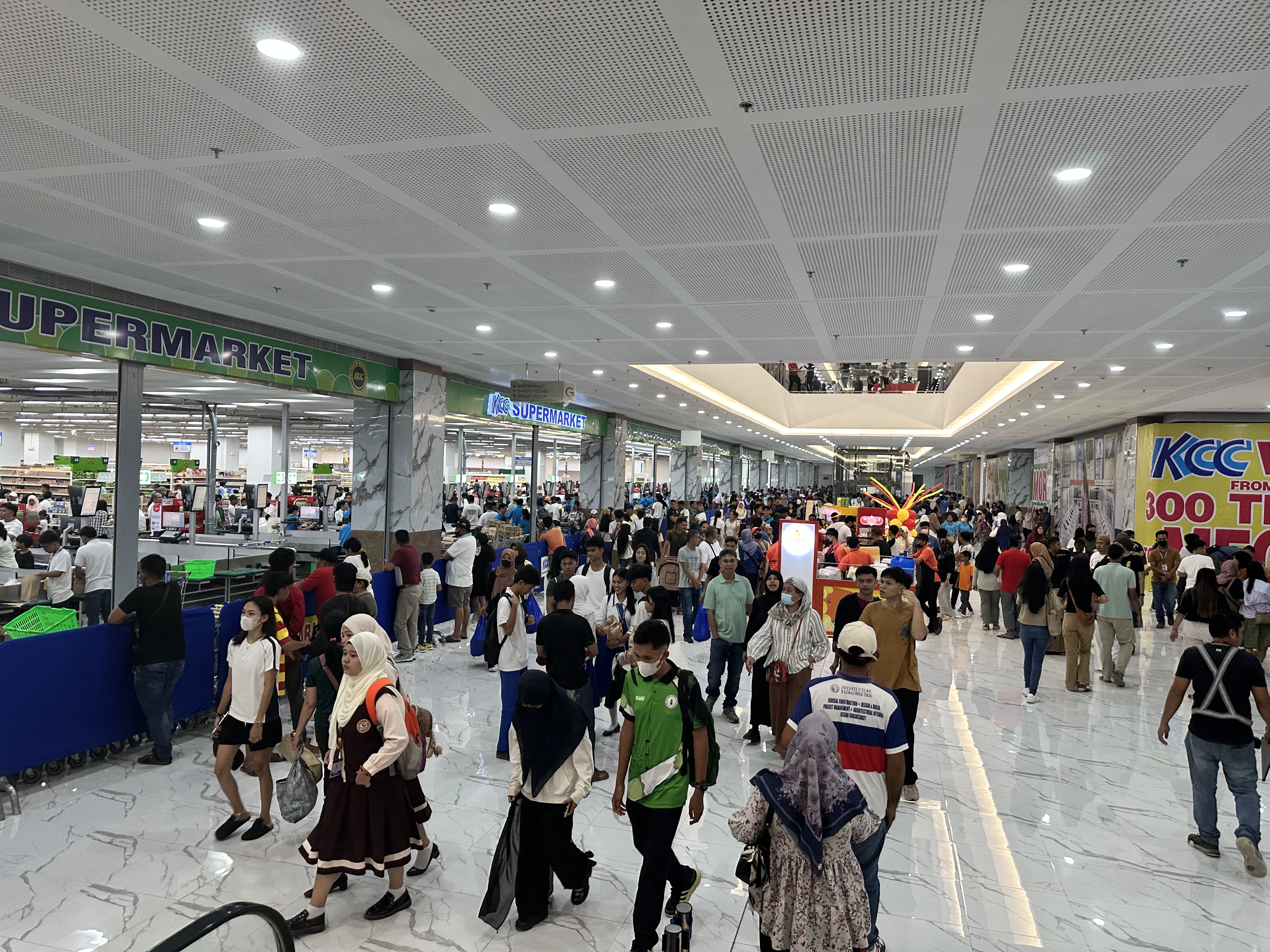
Ground floor of the mall

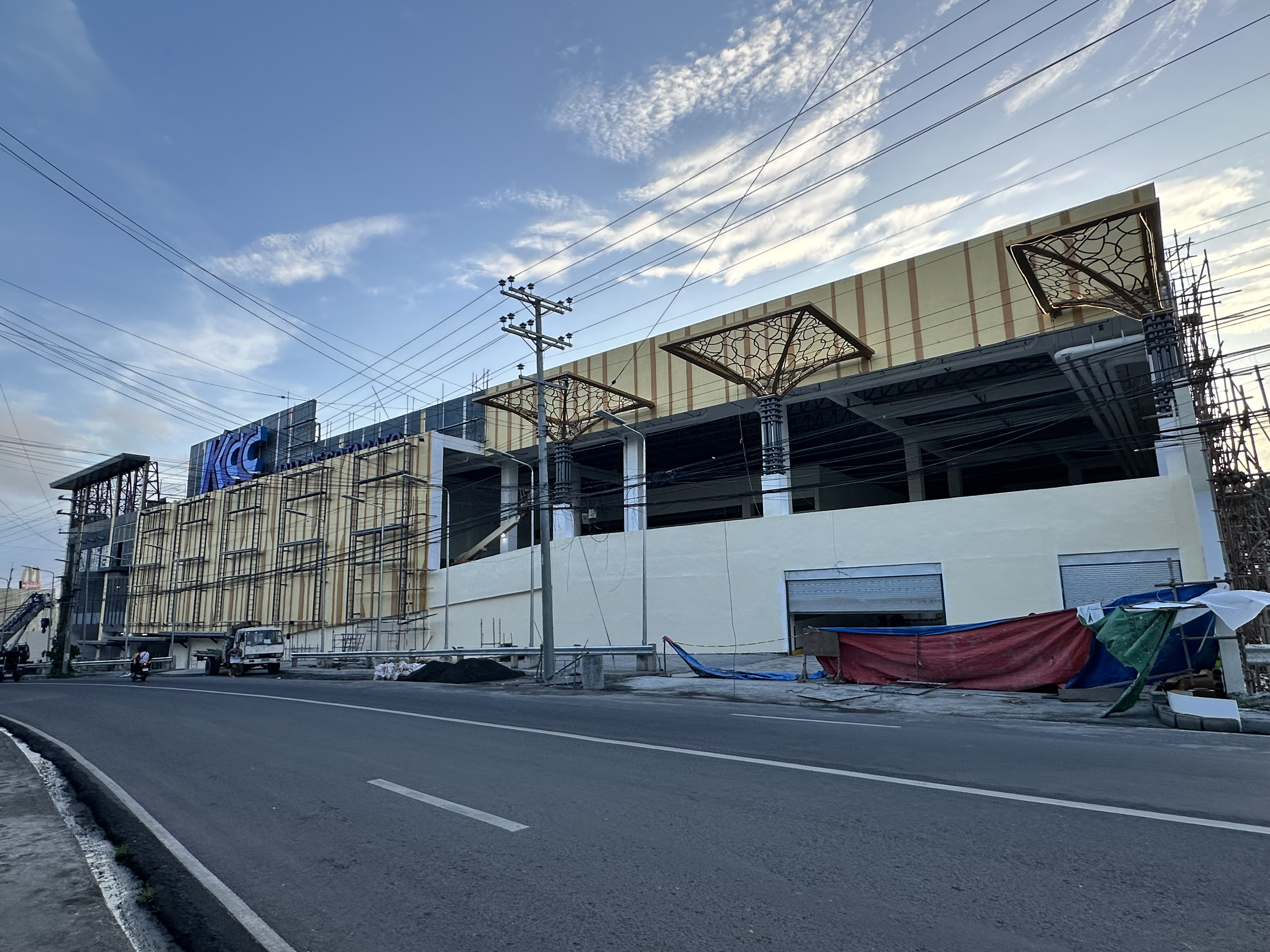
Mall entrance along Sinsuat Avenue (March 2025)

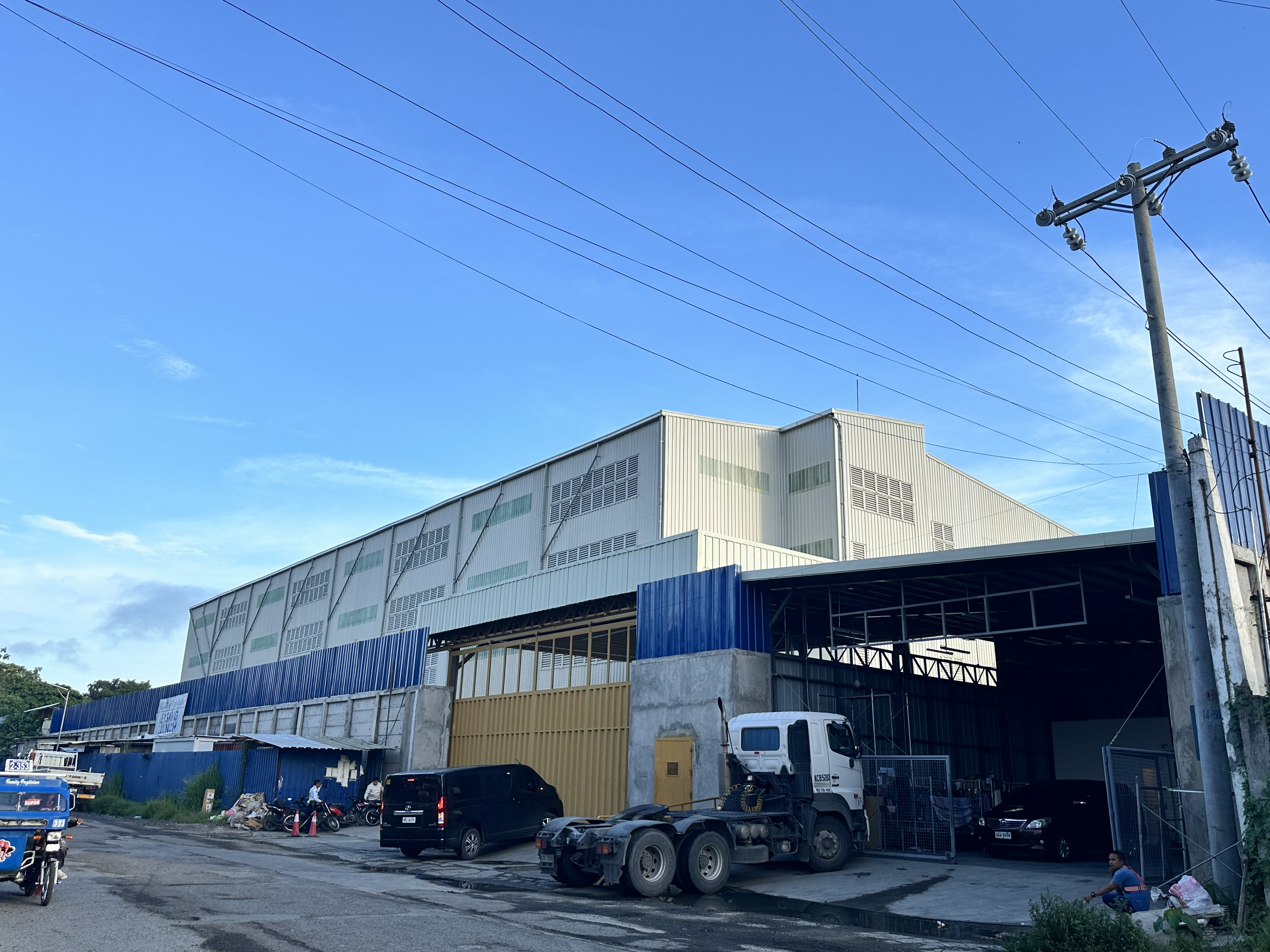
3 floor level of KCC Mall Warehouse along Jose Lim Sr. Street

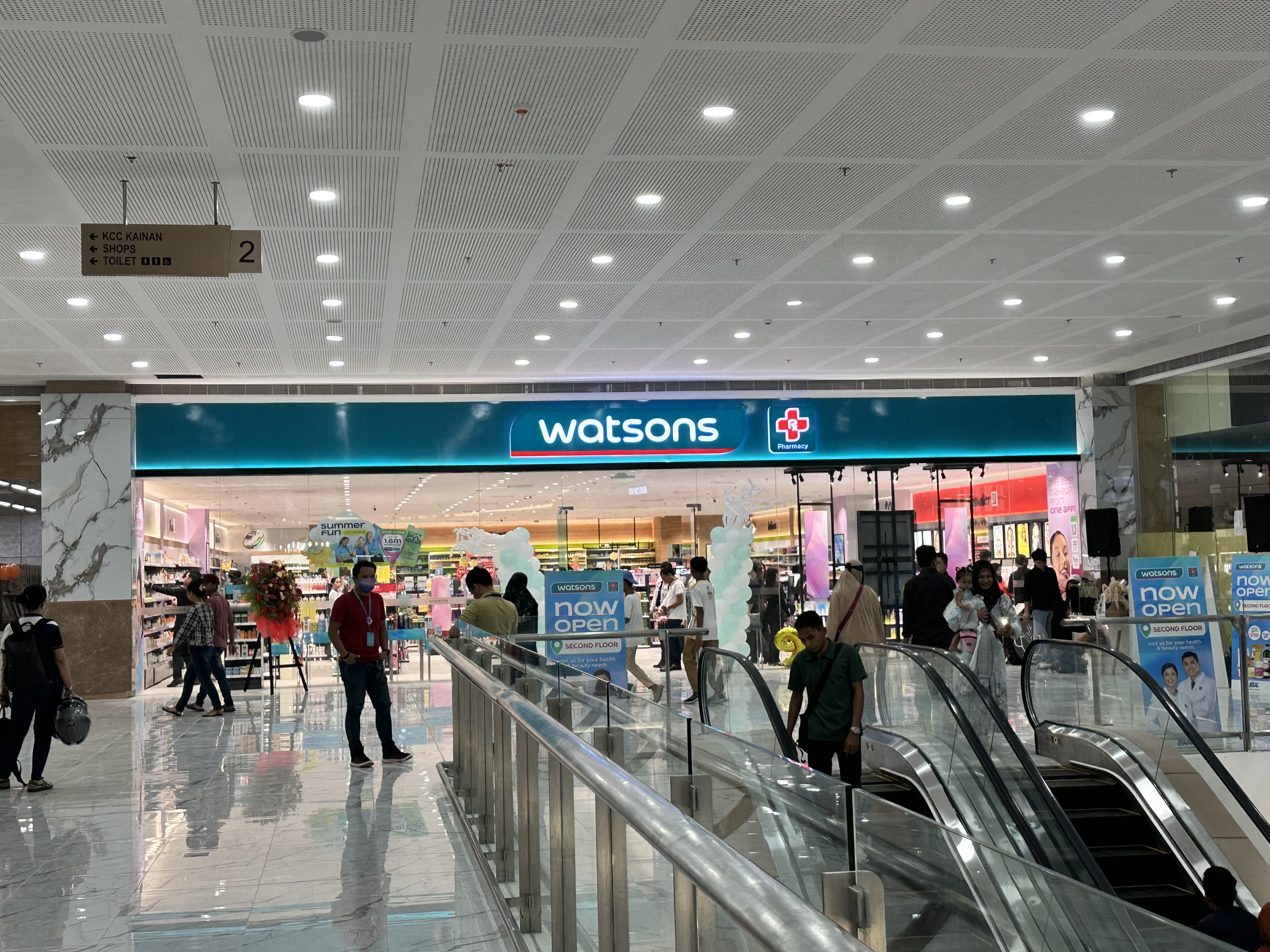
2nd floor of the mall

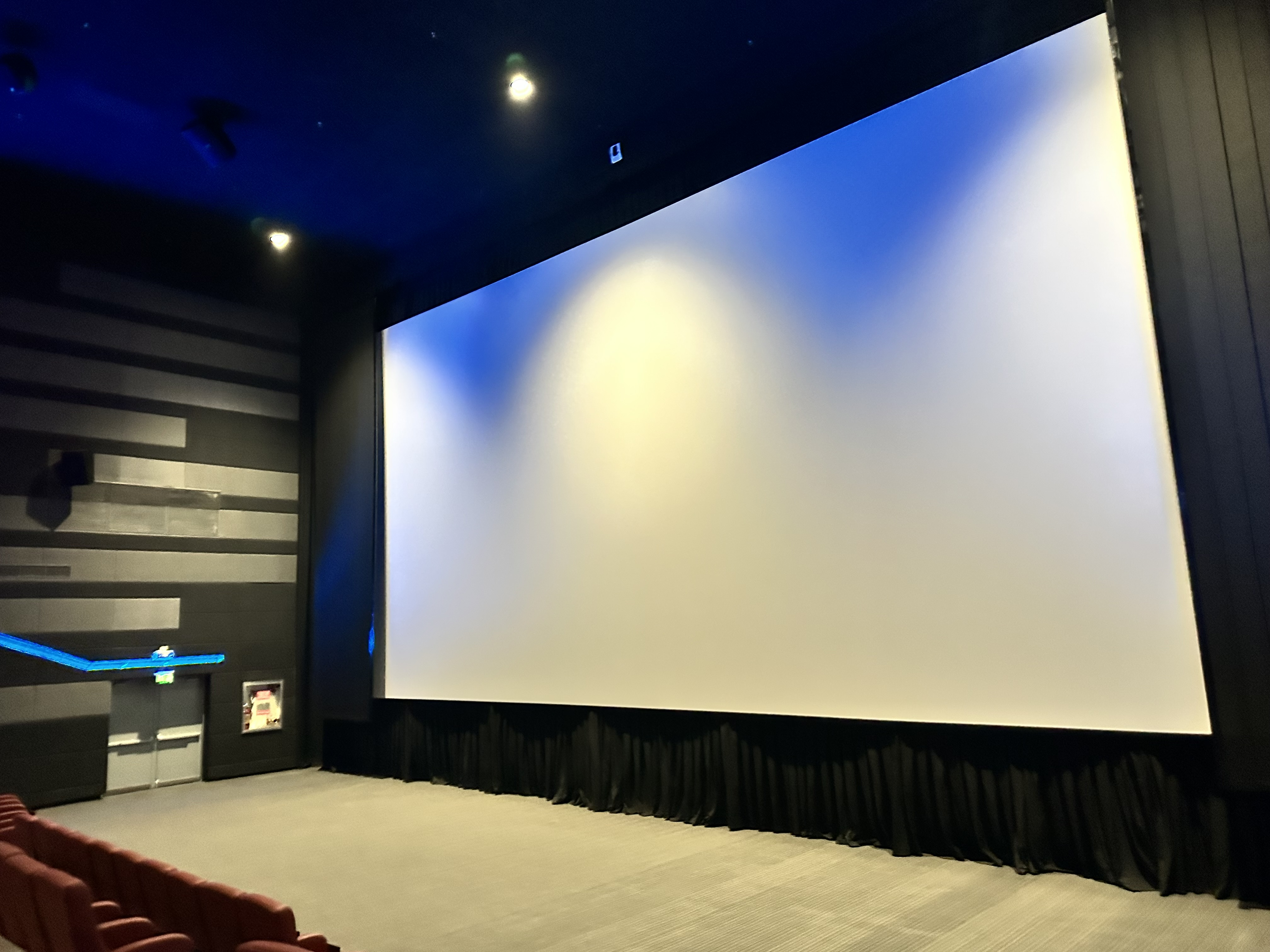
Cinema 5 features ATMOS Dolby

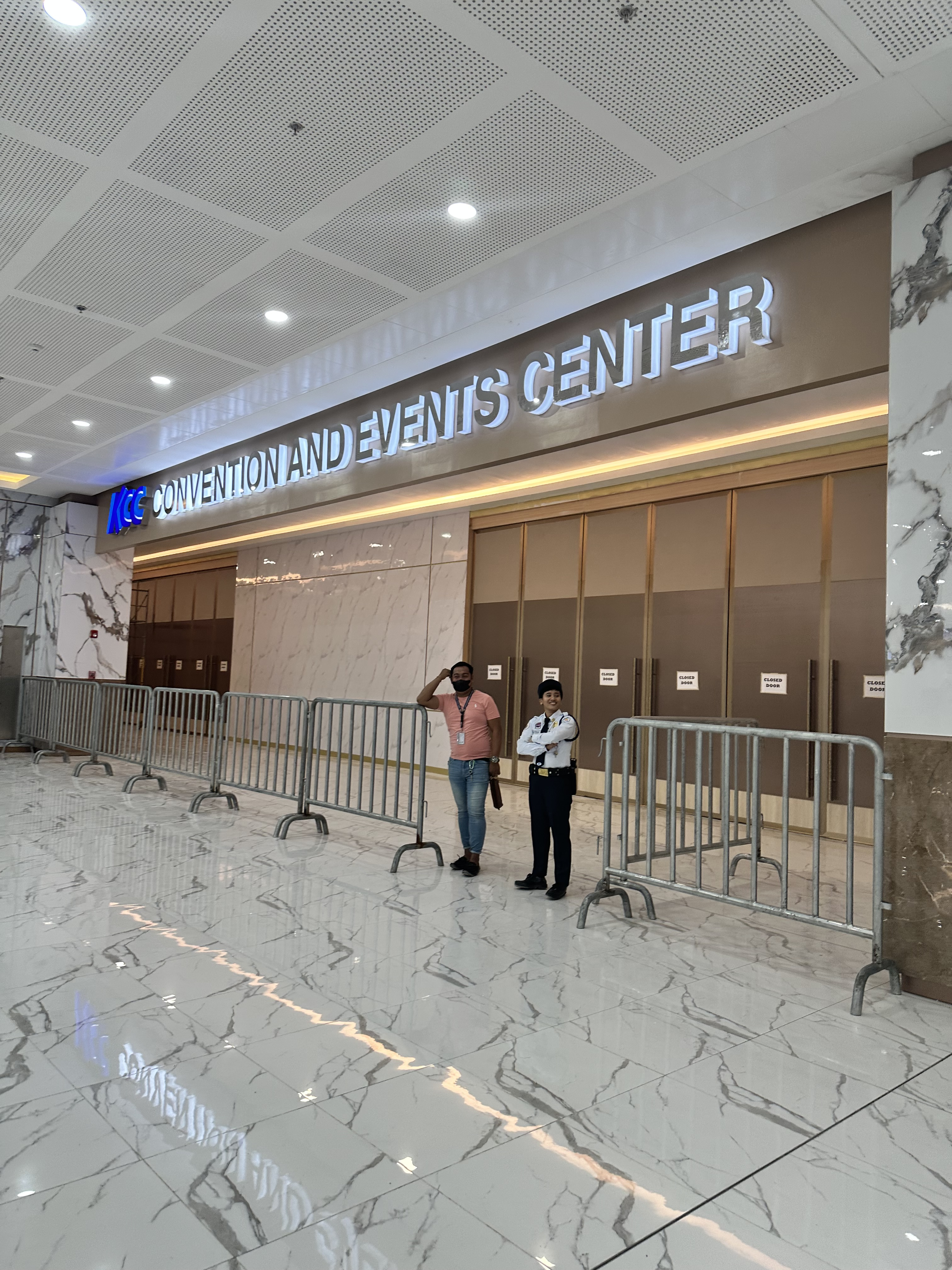
Convention and Events Center

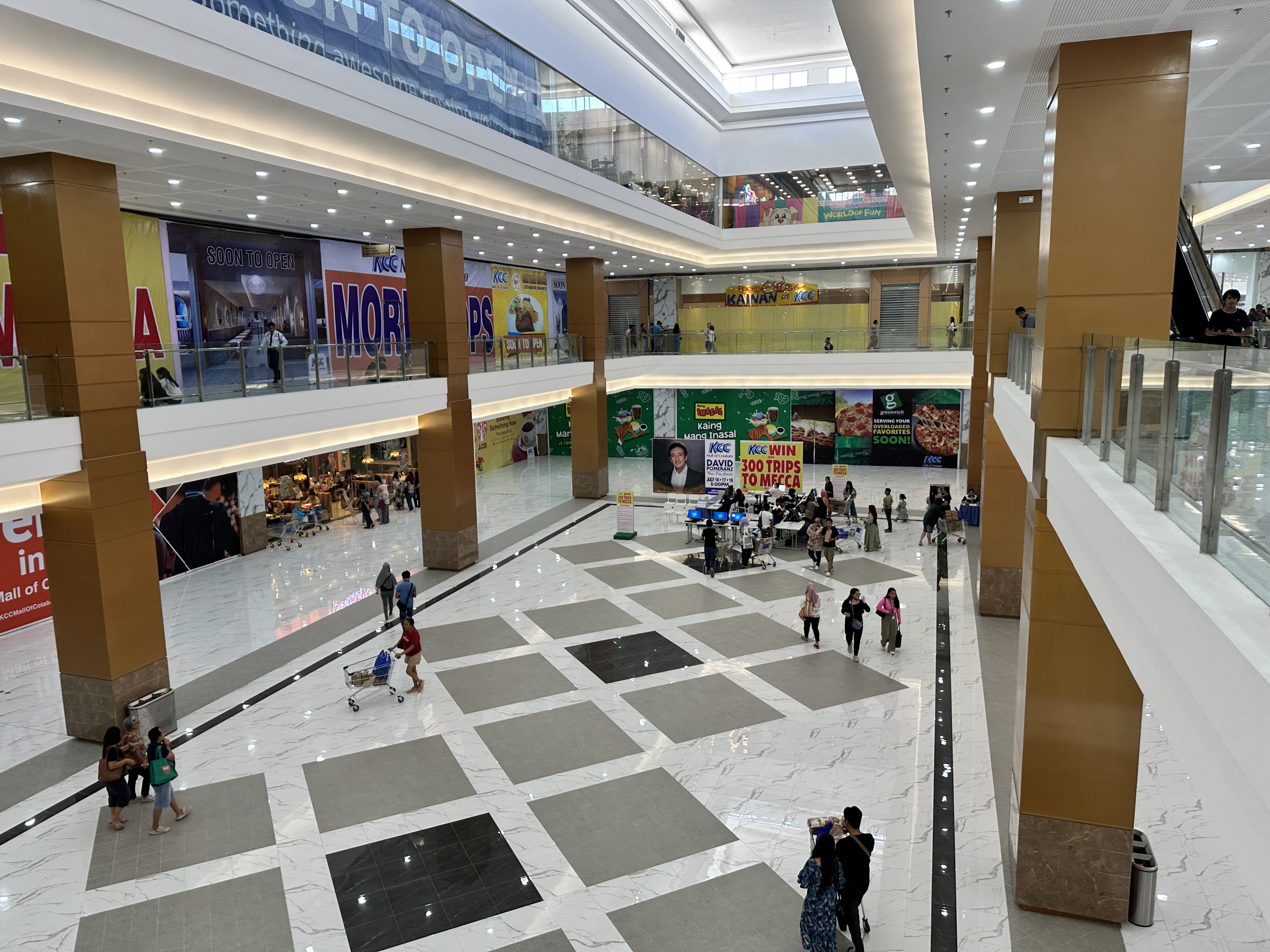
Atrium or the Activity Center
