= 2025 Cotabato City local elections =

Local election in Cotabato City, Maguindanao del Norte

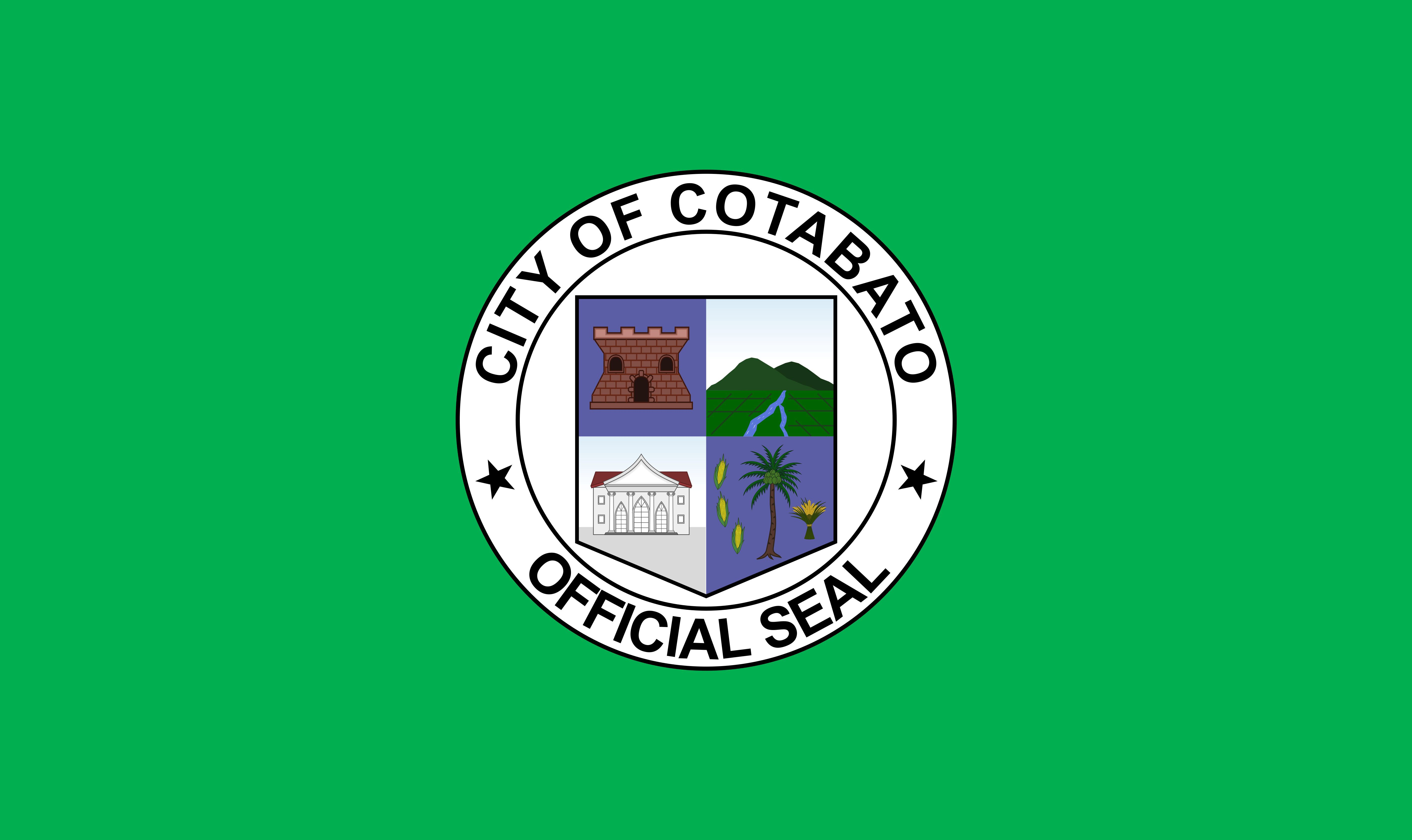
- May 12, 2025
- Registered: 135,999
- Turnout: 65.94% ▲8.79 pp
- Mayoral election
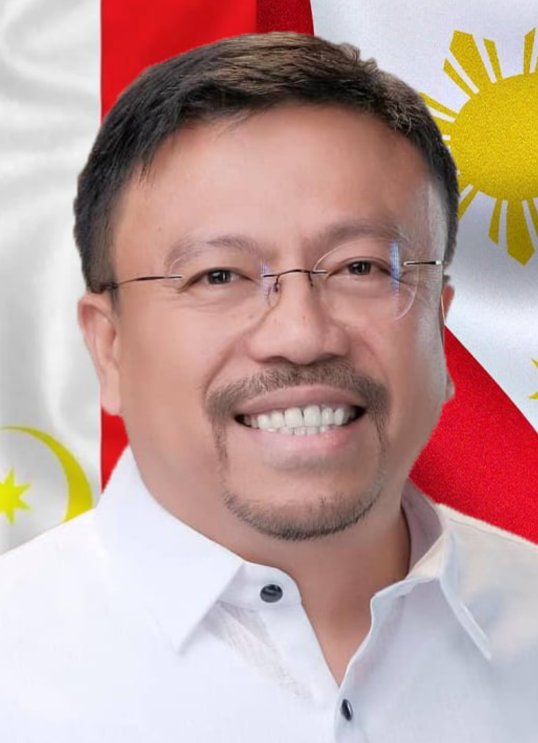
		LAKAS	NPC
Candidate	Bruce Matabalao	Butch Abu	Frances Cynthia Guiani
Party	UBJP	Lakas	NPC
Running mate	Johair Madag	Datu Bimbo Pasawiran	Jayjay Guiani III
Popular vote	45,578	28,642	12,688
Percentage	52.35%	32.9%	14.57%
Mayor before election
Bruce Matabalao
UBJP
Elected mayor
Bruce Matabalao
UBJP
- Vice mayoral election
	UBJP	LAKAS	NPC
Candidate	Johair Madag	Datu Bimbo Pasawiran	Jayjay Guiani III
Party	UBJP	Lakas-CMD	NPC
Popular vote	38,528	32,233	14,683
Percentage	45.09%	37.72%	17.18%
Vice Mayor before election
Butch Abu
Lakas
Elected Vice Mayor
Johair Madag
UBJP
- City council

10 of the 14 seats in the Cotabato City Council 6 seats needed for a majority
	First party	Second party
Party	UBJP	Lakas
Seats won	10	0
Seat change	▲3	New
Popular vote	333,377	259,995
Percentage	47.17%	36.79%
Swing	▼2.14 pp	New
	Third party	Fourth party
Party	NPC	Independent
Seats won	0	0
Seat change	▼3	0
Popular vote	72,718	40,663
Percentage	10.29%	5.75%
Swing	▼32.77 pp	▼4.32 pp

Local elections were held in Cotabato City, Maguindanao del Norte on May 12, 2025, within the 2025 Philippine general election. The voters of Cotabato City elected for all of elective local posts in the city which are the mayor, vice mayor, and the ten electable city councilors of the Cotabato City Council. Voters also voted for Maguindanao del Norte's at-large congressional district as the city is a part of the congressional district. This is the first election in Cotabato City after the splitting of Maguindanao to Maguindano del Norte and del Sur.

All elective positions in the city was won by the United Bangsamoro Justice Party, a party formed by the Moro Islamic Liberation Front in 2014.

== Background ==
Incumbent mayor Bruce Matabalao was elected in the 2022 Philippine general election defeating incumbent mayor Cynthia Guiani. A petition was filed by Guiani against Matabalao for alleged vote buying saying that Matabalao's camp gave rice aid and P1,000 per individual in exchange for their votes for election day. The Commission on Elections (COMELEC) junked the petition after the election, however on April 23, 2025, COMELEC's 2nd division declared Guiani as the winner in 2022 after nullifying 36 clustered precincts in the city citing voting fraud. COMELEC then set aside the 2022 proclamation of Matabalao but he refused to step down saying that the decision is not final.

== Electoral system ==
The voters of Cotabato City vote for the mayor and vice mayor using first-past-the-post voting where voters can choose one candidate and the candidate that receives the most votes will get elected to the position despite not achieving the majority of the votes. 10 out of the 14 city councilors of Cotabato City are elected using plurality block voting where the top ten candidates will get elected, voters may choose up to ten candidates but not more than ten.

== Tickets ==
Source: COMELEC

=== Administration coalition ===
United Bangsamoro Justice Party (UBJP) Ticket
Position	#	Candidate	Political Party (Note: Nationally, they are all members of the Partido Federal ng Pilipinas.)
For Mayor	4.	Mohammad Ali "Bruce" Matabalao	UBJP
For Vice Mayor	2.	Johair Madag	UBJP
For Councilors	6.	Shalimar Candao	UBJP
For Councilors	8.	Michael Datumanong	UBJP
For Councilors	10.	Faidz Edzla	UBJP
For Councilors	12.	Florante "Popoy" Formento	UBJP
For Councilors	22.	Anwar Malang	UBJP
For Councilors	24.	Mohamad Ali Mangelen	UBJP
For Councilors	25.	Guiadzuri Midtimbang II	UBJP
For Councilors	26.	Nasrudin "Kap Jonas" Mohammad	UBJP
For Councilors	27.	Joven Pangilan	UBJP
For Councilors	34.	Mohammad Abu Jihad "Datu Raiz" Sema	UBJP

=== Primary opposition coalitions ===
Nationalist People's Coalition (NPC) Ticket
Position	#	Candidate	Political Party
For Mayor	3.	Frances Cynthia Guiani	NPC
For Vice Mayor	1.	Japal "Jayjay" Guiani III	NPC
For Councilors	11.	Hervey Emberga	NPC
For Councilors	16.	Danda Juanday	NPC
For Councilors	18.	Romeo Lidasan	NPC
For Councilors	19.	Moksal Lokua	NPC
For Councilors	20.	Henry Macion	NPC
For Councilors	23.	Dumugkao Mangelen	NPC
For Councilors	30.	Eduardo Rabago	NPC
For Councilors	32.	Alshamir Santiago	NPC
For Councilors	33.	Abdullah Sekak	NPC
For Councilors	40.	Sukarno Utto	NPC

Lakas-Christian Muslim Democrats (LAKAS) Ticket
Position	#	Candidate	Political Party (Note: Additionally, they are all members of the SIAP Party.)
For Mayor	1.	Johari "Butch" Abu	Lakas
For Vice Mayor	3.	Datu Bimbo Pasawiran	Lakas
For Councilors	1.	Hunyn Abu	Lakas
For Councilors	2.	Henjie Monte Ali	Lakas
For Councilors	5.	Baby Ayunan	Lakas
For Councilors	17.	Abubakar "Bobby" Katambak	Lakas
For Councilors	28.	Maraouf Pasawiran	Lakas
For Councilors	31.	Freddie Ridao	Lakas
For Councilors	35.	Sukarno "Suk" Sema	Lakas
For Councilors	36.	Norhassim Sinarimbo	Lakas
For Councilors	37.	Kusin Taha	Lakas
For Councilors	38.	Abdulrakim "Gabby" Usman	Lakas

=== Independents ===
Independent candidates
Position	#	Candidate	Political Party
For Mayor	2.	Hailah Dilangalen	Independent
For Councilors	3.	Arman Aman	Independent
For Councilors	4.	Analie Anastacio	Independent
For Councilors	7.	Christina Chua	Independent
For Councilors	9.	Nor-Aiyne "Bai Lorna Tingog" Ebrahim	Independent
For Councilors	13.	Rizaldy Dick Verde Garcia	Independent
For Councilors	14.	Mohaimen "James" Guiaman	Independent
For Councilors	15.	Macmod Guiapar	Independent
For Councilors	21.	Kagui Hammed Maguing	Independent
For Councilors	29.	Parido Pigkaulan	Independent
For Councilors	39.	Naut Usman	Independent

== Mayoral election ==
Incumbent mayor Bruce Matabalao of the United Bangsamoro Justice Party (UBJP) ran for re-election to a second term. There were 3 other candidates that he faced, they are former mayor and previous opponent Cynthia Guiani of the Nationalist People's Coalition (NPC), incumbent vice mayor and 2022 running mate Butch Abu of Lakas–CMD (Lakas) and doctor Hailah Dilangalen, an independent.

=== Candidates ===
==== Declared ====
- Butch Abu (Lakas), incumbent vice mayor of Cotabato City since 2022
- Hailah Dilangalen (Independent), doctor
- Cynthia Guiani (NPC), former mayor of Cotabato City (2016-2022)
- Bruce Matabalao (UBJP), incumbent mayor of Cotabato City since 2022

=== Results ===
2025 Cotabato City mayoral election results
Party	Candidate	Votes	%	±%
UBJP	Bruce Matabalao (incumbent)	45,578	52.35%	−1.99%
Lakas	Butch Abu	28,642	32.9%	N/A
NPC	Frances Cynthia Guiani	12,688	14.57%	−31.08%
Independent	Hailah Dilangalen	153	0.18%	N/A
Total votes		87,061	100.00%	
UBJP hold				

== Vice mayoral election ==
Incumbent vice mayor Butch Abu of Lakas was eligible for re-election to a second term but ran for mayor, he was previously affiliated with the UBJP. 3 candidates ran to replace Abu, UBJP nominated former Barangay Poblacion 2 kagawad Johair Madag who ran against incumbent councilor Jayjay Guiani III of the NPC and Barangay Kalanganan chairman Datu Bimbo Pasawiran of Lakas.

=== Candidates ===
==== Declared ====
- Jayjay Guiani III (NPC), incumbent councilor since 2019
- Johair Madag (UBJP), former barangay kagawad of Barangay Poblacion 2
- Datu Bimbo Pasawiran (Lakas), incumbent barangay chairman of Barangay Kalanganan since 2023

=== Results ===
2025 Cotabato City vice mayoral election results
Party	Candidate	Votes	%	±%
UBJP	Johair Madag	38,528	45.09%	−5.87
Lakas	Datu Bimbo Pasawiran	32,233	37.72%	N/A
NPC	Jayjay Guiani III	14,683	17.18%	−25.07
Total votes		85,444	100.00%	
UBJP gain from Lakas				

== City council election ==
=== Summary ===
Party	Votes	%	Seats	+/–
United Bangsamoro Justice Party	333,377	47.17	10	+3
Lakas–CMD	259,995	36.79	0	New
Nationalist People's Coalition	72,718	10.29	0	–3
Independent	40,663	5.75	0	0
Total	706,753	100.00	10	0
Total votes	89,673	–		
Registered voters/turnout	135,999	65.94		
Source: Rappler

=== Retiring incumbents ===
- Abdillah Lim (NPC)

=== Incumbents who ran for another post ===
- Jayjay Guiani III (NPC), ran for vice mayor

=== Results ===
2025 Cotabato City Council election results
Party	Candidate	Votes	%
UBJP	Popoy Formento (incumbent)	41,350	30.40%
UBJP	Kap Jonas Mohammad	36,352	26.73%
UBJP	Datu Raiz Sema	34,591	25.43%
UBJP	Michael Datumanong	34,162	25.12%
UBJP	Anwar Malang	33,868	24.90%
UBJP	Faidz Edzla	31,890	23.45%
UBJP	Guiadzuri Midtimbang II (incumbent)	31,532	23.19%
UBJP	Mohamad Ali Mangelen	30,775	22.63%
UBJP	Joven Pangilan	29,632	21.79%
UBJP	Shalimar Candao	29,225	21.49%
Lakas	Hunyn Abu (incumbent)	28,362	20.85%
Lakas	Baby Ayunan	27,907	20.52%
Lakas	Marouf Pasawiran (incumbent)	27,032	19.88%
Lakas	Suk Sema	26,978	19.84%
Lakas	Norhassim Sinarimbo	26,327	19.36%
Lakas	Freddie Ridao	25,573	18.80%
Lakas	Kusin Taha (incumbent)	24,900	18.31%
Lakas	Gabby Usman (incumbent)	24,558	18.06%
Lakas	Henjie Ali (incumbent)	24,206	17.80%
Lakas	Bobby Katambak	24,152	17.76%
Independent	Bai Lorna Tingog Ebrahim	12,467	9.17%
NPC	Eduardo Rabago	11,528	8.48%
NPC	Danda Juanday (incumbent)	11,051	8.13%
NPC	Henry Macion	10,319	7.59%
Independent	Analie Anastacio	8,230	6.05%
NPC	Dumugkao Mangelan	7,505	5.52%
NPC	Hervy Emberga	7,004	5.15%
NPC	Romeo Lidasan	7,000	5.15%
NPC	Sukarno Utto	6,926	5.09%
Independent	Christina Chua	6,344	4.66%
NPC	Alshamir Santiago	4,491	3.30%
NPC	Abdullah Sekak	3,934	2.89%
Independent	Dick Garcia	3,227	2.37%
NPC	Moksal Lokua	2,960	2.18%
Independent	Kagui Hammed Maguing	2,882	2.12%
Independent	Macmod Guiapar	2,415	1.78%
Independent	Naut Usman	1,756	1.29%
Independent	Arman Aman	1,330	0.98%
Independent	James Guiaman	1,049	0.77%
Independent	Parido Pigkaulan	963	0.71%
Total votes		706,753	100.00%
