= 2022 Cotabato City local elections =

Philippine election

- May 9, 2022
- Registered: 120,221
- Turnout: 57.15%
- Mayoral election
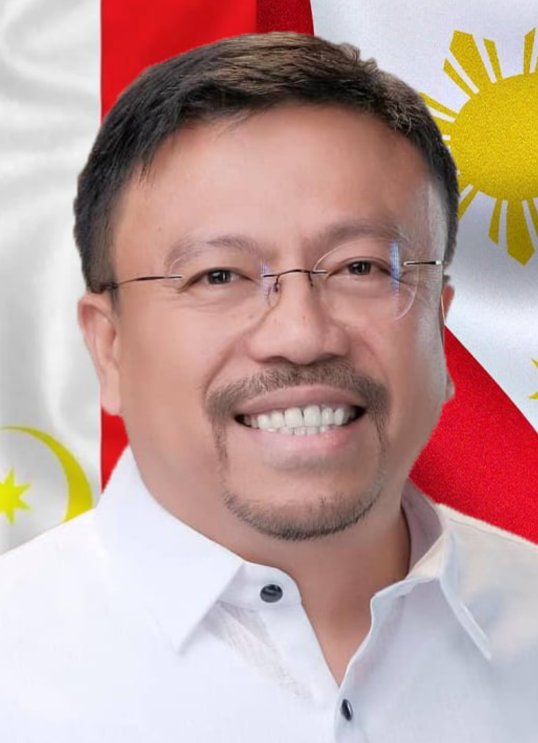
		NPC
Candidate	Bruce Matabalao	Frances Cynthia Guiani
Party	UBJP	NPC
Popular vote	36,151	30,373
Percentage	54.34%	45.65%
Mayor before election
Frances Cynthia Guiani
NPC
Elected mayor
Bruce Matabalao
UBJP
- Vice mayoral election
	UBJP	NPC
Candidate	Butch Abu	Graham Nazer Dumama
Party	UBJP	NPC
Popular vote	33,050	27,401
Percentage	50.96%	42.25%
Vice mayor before election
Graham Nazer Dumama
NPC
Elected Vice mayor
Butch Abu
UBJP

Local elections took place in Cotabato City on May 9, 2022 within the Philippine general election. Registered voters of the city elected candidates for the following elective local posts: mayor, vice mayor. The city is also within Maguindanao's 1st district.

== Background ==
The mayoral elections was contested between incumbent Mayor Cynthia Guiani-Sayadi of the Nationalist People's Coalition (NPC) and former journalist and city councilor Bruce Matabalao of the United Bangsamoro Justice Party (UBJP), a political party affiliated with the Moro Islamic Liberation Front (MILF). Members of the MILF forms a significant part of the current government of the Bangsamoro autonomous region which was formed in 2019 through a plebiscite. Cotabato City, formerly part of Soccsksargen opted to be included in Bangsamoro.

The two parties are at odds at each other. Guiani-Sayadi campaigned against the inclusion of Cotabato City in Bangsamoro in the 2019 plebiscite but most residents voted in favor of the city joining the newly formed region. Guiani-Sayadi has challenged the result.

On May 7, 2022, the delivery of vote counting machines (VCMs) to the Cotabato City Central Pilot Elementary School supposedly for final testing was blocked by supporters from both camps. Tensions ended when the Commission on Elections (COMELEC) and the two parties agreed to allow soldiers and police officers to transport the VCMs. The two parties also agreed to an arrangement to have 500 police officers serve as Electoral Board (EB) members on election day.

Among the incidents reported during election day include: a malfunctioning VCM at a precinct in San Vicente Academy, harassment of voters in Sero Elementary School, armed men opening fire in Pagalamatan Elementary School in Tamontoka III injuring two people, and a man in Vilo Central Elementary School being mauled by a group of people trying to open the school gate.

The UBJP dominated the Cotabato City local elections. Matabalao and his running mate Butch Abu were proclaimed by the COMELEC Board of Canvassers as winners on May 10, 2022. The board also proclaimed the winning city councilors the following day namely: Florante Formento, Hunyn Abu, Maroup Pasawiran, Jay Jay Guiani, Abdulrakim Usman, Guiadzuri Midtimbang, Kusin Taha, Henjie Ali, Danda Juanday, and Abdilla Lim. All were from UBJP except for Guiani, Juanday and Lim who were part of incumbent mayor Guiani-Sayadi's slate.

== Mayoral election ==
Incumbent mayor Cynthia Guiani-Sayadi is running for another term.

Cotabato City mayoral election
Party	Candidate	Votes	%
UBJP	Bruce Matabalao	29,812	56.51
NPC	Cynthia Guiani-Sayadi	22,939	43.49
Total votes		52,751	100.00
UBJP gain from NPC			

== Vice mayoral election ==
Incumbent vice mayor Graham Nazer Dumama is running for another term.

Cotabato City vice mayoral election
Party	Candidate	Votes	%
UBJP	Johari "Butch" Abu	27,117	52.74
NPC	Graham Nazer Dumama	20,730	40.32
Independent	Nasrudin Mohammad	3,568	6.94
Total votes		51,415	100.00
UBJP gain from NPC			
