= Narciso Yu Ekey =

Filipino businessman (born 1958)

Member of the Bangsamoro Transition Authority Parliament
- In office March 29, 2019 – September 15, 2022
- Nominated by: Moro Islamic Liberation Front
- Appointed by: Rodrigo Duterte
- Chief Minister: Murad Ebrahim

Personal details
- Born: Narciso Co Yu Ekey; Cotabato, Cotabato, Philippines April 18, 1958 (age 68)

Narciso "Ongpin" Co Yu Ekey is a Filipino businessman and accountant who was a member of the Bangsamoro Transition Authority Parliament.

== Early life and education ==
Narciso Co Yu Ekey, better known as Ongpin, was born on April 18, 1958, in modern-day Cotabato City. Yu Ekey attended the Cotabato Chinese School for his elementary education before going to the United States to study at the Central Bucks East High School East in Pennsylvania. He took up bachelors degree in commerce-accountancy and psychology simultaneously at the De La Salle University graduating in 1979. He also obtained a law degree at the Notre Dame University in 1987.

== Career ==
=== Bangsamoro Parliament ===
When the Bangsamoro autonomous region was established in 2019, Yu Ekey became part of the regional government led by the Moro Islamic Liberation Front (MILF). He was among the first set of members of appointed to the Bangsamoro Transition Authority Parliament in early 2019. He was nominated by the MILF and appointed by President Rodrigo Duterte to the legislature to represent the settlers' community in the region.

When President Bongbong Marcos, Duterte's successor, appointed a new set of members for the parliament on August 12, 2022, Yu Ekey was not among the reappointees.

=== Cotabato City deputy mayor ===
On July 8, 2022, Yu Ekey was appointed as one of the four deputy mayors of Cotabato City by the locality's mayor Mohammad Ali Matabalao. He is tasked to represent the Chinese-Filipino community of the city.

== Personal life ==
Yu Ekey's father Moya Ekey is a close relative of former Cotabato City Mayor Cynthia Guiani-Sayadi. The Yu Ekeys are a wealthy family in Cotabato City who runs a reputed hardware business.
