= National Government–Bangsamoro Government Intergovernmental Relations Body =

- IGRB

Agency overview
- Formed: December 16, 2019
- Jurisdiction: Bangsamoro, Philippines
- Agency executive: Mohagher M. Iqbal Amenah F. Pangandaman, Co-Chairpersons

The National Government–Bangsamoro Government Intergovernmental Relations Body (IGRB) is an intergovernmental body which deals with relations between the Bangsamoro regional government and the Philippine national government.

== History ==
The Bangsamoro Organic Law, the basis legislation of the Bangsamoro Autonomous Region in Muslim Mindanao (BARMM or Bangsamoro) mandates the creation of Intergovernmental Relation (IGR) bodies that would manage the autonomous region's relations with the central Philippine government. The concept of the National Government–Bangsamoro Government Intergovernmental Relations Body (IGRB) was made during the negotiations for the Comprehensive Agreement on the Bangsamoro between the Moro Islamic Liberation Front (MILF) and Philippine national government. The body was envisioned as a platform for discussion and dispute resolution for intergovernmental issues between the then-proposed Bangsamoro autonomous region and the national government.

The BARMM was established in early 2019 after the BOL was ratified in a two-part plebiscite replacing the Autonomous Region in Muslim Mindanao (ARMM).

In July 2019, Bangsamoro Chief Minister Murad Ebrahim met with President Rodrigo Duterte with the two agreeing to form an intergovernmental body for cooperation of the Bangsamoro regional government and the national government. At that time there was no set date for the first meeting.

The few months prior to the IGRB's creation caused confusion regarding the relation of the national government's executive departments and the Bangsamoro region's government. The responsibility of the Department of Public Works and Highways of funding national road projects within the jurisdiction of the Bangsamoro region has been unclear and proposals to create a "National DPWH" was objected by the Bangsamoro regional government believing they now have jurisdiction over the matter. The Bangsamoro Parliament also raised concern over the memorandum issued by Eduardo Año of the national government's Department of the Interior and Local Government (DILG) regarding the usage of mobile phones by local executives. The document was interpreted to have lumped the Bangsamoro Chief Minister with the same level as the Bangsamoro Local Government Minister and provincial governors and mayors. It was unclear whether a secretary of an national executive body could issue a memorandum addressed to the Chief Minister of Bangsamoro.

Officials of the National Government-Bangsamoro Government IGRB met for the first time in Davao City on December 16, 2019. Officials of the body convened at least three more times in 2020; on May 29, August 28 and October 9.

== Role ==
The National Government-Bangsamoro Government IGRB is an intergovernmental body which provides an institutional mechanism for sustained cooperation and coordination between the agencies established by the BARMM and those of the Philippine National Government.

== Composition ==
The following is the composition of the National Government–Bangsamoro Government Intergovernmental Relations Body:

National Government–Bangsamoro Government Intergovernmental Relations Body
BARMM	National Government
Education Minister Mohagher Iqbal (Co-chair); Bangsamoro Parliament Speaker Ali Pangalian M. Balindong; Senior Minister Abunawas L. Maslamama; Cabinet Secretary Mohammad Asnin K. Pendatun; Interior and Local Government Minister Sha Elijah B. Dumama-Alba; Public Works Minister Eduard U. Guerra; Social Services Minister Raissa H. Jajurie; Agriculture, Fisheries and Agrarian Reform Minister Mohammad S. Yacob; Transportation and Communications Minister Paisalin P. Tago; Environment, Natural Resources, and Energy Minister Akmad A. Brahim	Budget and Management Secretary Amenah F. Pangandaman (Co-chair); Presidential Adviser on Peace, Reconciliation and Unity Carlito G. Galvez Jr.; Socioeconomic Planning Secretary Arsenio M. Balisacan; Interior Secretary Juanito Victor C. Remulla; Defense Secretary Gilberto C. Teodoro, Jr.; Public Works Secretary Manuel M. Bonoan; Energy Secretary Raphael P.M. Lotilla; Agriculture Secretary Francisco Tiu Laurel, Jr.; Transportation Secretary Vince Dizon; Special Assistant to the President Antonio Ernesto F. Lagdameo Jr
National Government IGRB Secretariat: Office of the Presidential Adviser on Peace, Reconciliation and Unity (OPAPRU) Bangsamoro Government IGRB Secretariat: Bangsamoro Attorney General's Office (BAGO)
