= Dickson Hermoso =

Filipino government and military official

Bangsamoro Minister of Transportation and Communications
- In office July 15, 2019 – September 23, 2022
- Succeeded by: Paisalin Tago

Personal details
- Citizenship: Filipino
- Military career
- Allegiance: Philippines
- Branch: Philippine Army
- Service years: ?–2016
- Unit: 6th Infantry Division
- Conflicts: Moro conflict

Dickson Peñas Hermoso is a Filipino government official and former military official who served as the head of the Ministry of Transportation and Communications of Bangsamoro. He was also known for being part of the Philippine Army's 6th Infantry Division which was involved in the Moro conflict.

== Military career ==
A native of Cotabato, Hermoso served for about three decades in the Armed Forces of the Philippines. As part of the Philippine Army, he was part of the 6th Infantry Division (6th ID) which fought against the Moro Islamic Liberation Front (MILF) in Mindanao until the signing of the Comprehensive Agreement on the Bangsamoro in 2014 between the national government and the MILF. He was also simultaneously involved in the Mindanao peace process. In 2004, as an Army major, he became the head of the national government's Coordinating Committee on the Cessation of Hostilities and in 2013 as a colonel and 6th ID spokesperson managed to accomplish an absence of hostilities between the military and the MILF. He also led offensives against the Bangsamoro Islamic Freedom Fighters such as Operation Darkhorse in 2014.

He was also involved in peace negotiations with the Rebolusyonaryo Partido Manggagawa ng Pilipinas/Revolutionary Proletarian Army/Alex Boncayao Brigade (RPM-P/RPA/ABB) and the Cordillera People's Liberation Army (CPLA) as part of the government's technical working groups.

He was also spokesperson for the 6th ID. He retired from service in 2016 as inspector general of the 6th ID.

== Government ==
President Rodrigo Duterte appointed Hermoso as assistant spokesperson of the Office of the Presidential Adviser on the Peace Process in January 2017.

Hermoso became part of the MILF-led Bangsamoro regional government when Chief Minister Murad Ebrahim appointed him as head of the region's Ministry of Transportation and Communications on July 15, 2020. He became the region's first Christian minister. As transport minister, he resolved a leadership dispute in the Maritime Industry Authority's Tawi Tawi provincial office. He also oversaw the transfer of six airports in the region managed by the Civil Aviation Authority of the Philippines to the Bangsamoro Airport Authority.

Hermoso tendered courtesy resignation on February 16, 2022 as per a directive by Ebrahim as part of a wider reorganization of the regional head's cabinet. Ebrahim decided to keep him two days later, rejecting his resignation. He would serve for a few more months until the appointment of Paisalin Tago as his successor on September 23, 2022.
