= Ministry of Transportation and Communications (Bangsamoro) =

Department responsible for affairs regarding communications and transportation

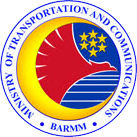

Agency overview
- Jurisdiction: Regional government of Bangsamoro
- Minister responsible: Paisalin Tago, Minister of Transportation and Communications
- Website: motc.bangsamoro.gov.ph

The Ministry of Transportation and Communications (MOTC) is the regional executive department of the Bangsamoro Autonomous Region in Muslim Mindanao (BARMM) responsible for affairs related to communications and transportation in the region.

Chief Minister Murad Ebrahim appointed former Philippine Army officer Dickson Hermoso on July 15, 2020 as the first transportation and communications minister. Hermoso became the region's first Christian minister.

The MOTC was organized from the sectoral offices of the national government's Department of Transportation (DOTr) in the now defunct Autonomous Region in Muslim Mindanao. In September 2019, the DOTr facilitated the transfer of the Land Transportation Franchising and Regulatory Board's (LTFRB) Region 12 facilities to the MOTC. The DOTr also formally transferred its assets and functions to the MOTC on March 27, 2021.

== Sectoral offices ==
- Bangsamoro Airport Authority
- Civil Aeronautics Board –Civil Aeronautics Board of the Bangsamoro
- Land Transportation Franchising and Regulatory Board – Bangsamoro Land Transportation Franchising and Regulatory Board
- Land Transportation Office – Bangsamoro Land Transportation Office
- Maritime Industry Authority – Bangsamoro Maritime Industry Authority
- National Telecommunications Commission – Bangsamoro Telecommuications Commission
- Philippine Ports Authority – Bangsamoro Port Management Authority

== Ministers ==
#	Minister	Term began	Term ended	Chief Minister
1	Dickson Hermoso	July 15, 2019	September 23, 2022	Murad Ebrahim
2	Paisalin Tago	September 23, 2022	incumbent	Murad Ebrahim
