= Police Regional Office Bangsamoro Autonomous Region =

Police of Bangsamoro

Philippine National Police Police Regional Office Bangsamoro Autonomous Region
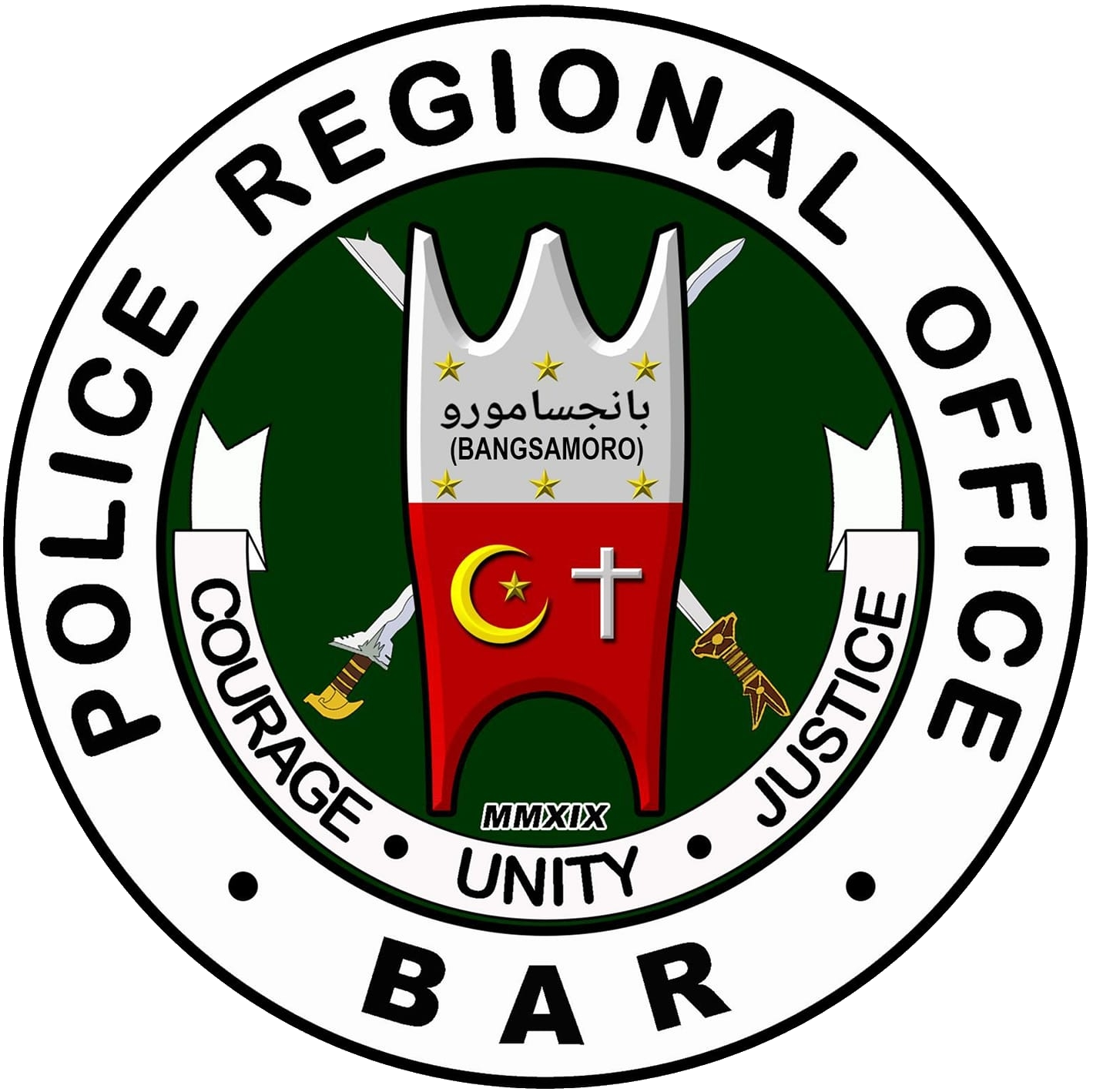
- Seal
- Abbreviation: PNP PRO BAR
- Motto: Courage, Unity, Justice

Jurisdictional structure
- Operations jurisdiction: Bangsamoro (excluding 63 Bangsamoro barangays in Cotabato), Philippines
- General nature: Local civilian police

Operational structure
- Agency executive: PBGEN Christopher M. Abecia, Regional Director
- Parent agency: Philippine National Police

Website
- proarmm.pnp.gov.ph

The Police Regional Office Bangsamoro Autonomous Region (PRO BAR), also known as the Bangsamoro Police, is the regional office of the Philippine National Police meant to cover the whole Bangsamoro autonomous region.

== History ==
=== Autonomous Region in Muslim Mindanao ===
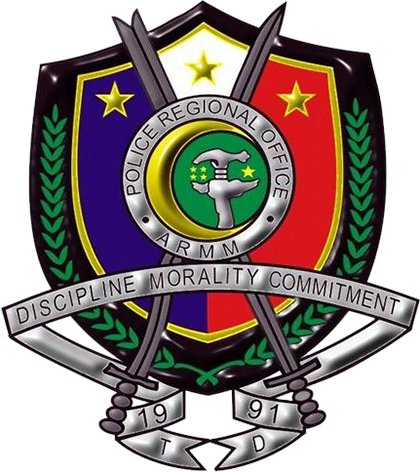
Logo as the PNP PRO ARMM.

The history of the Police Regional Office Bangsamoro Autonomous Region is traced back to the establishment of the Fourth Philippine Constabulary Zone of the Philippine Constabulary in 1971. In the same year, the headquarters of the constabulary unit, Camp Brigadier General Salipada K Pendatun was set up which would later be the main camp of the PRO BARMM. In 1990, the Autonomous Region in Muslim Mindanao (ARMM) was formed and the Police Regional Office Autonomous Region in Muslim Mindanao (PRO ARMM) was activated the following year.

=== Bangsamoro ===
When the Bangsamoro Autonomous Region in Muslim Mindanao (BARMM) succeeded the ARMM, the PRO ARMM was reorganized as the Police Regional Office Bangsamoro Autonomous Region in Muslim Mindanao (PRO BARMM). Since the Bangsamoro autonomous region had a slightly larger scope than its predecessor, the new police regional office had to expand its jurisdiction as well. They were previous proposals to create an independent police force for the region, but did not materialized.

On April 29, 2019, the PRO BARMM had started its gradual takeover of additional areas. They started supervising the Cotabato City Police which is still administratively under the control of Police Regional Office 12. They also began planning on how to put the barangays in Cotabato that are part of Bangsamoro under their jurisdiction.

The National Police Commission approved the reorganization of the police department into the Philippine Regional Office Bangsamoro Autonomous Region (PRO BAR) in September 2019 which also placed the Cotabato City police under the department's jurisdiction. The municipal police over the 63 Bangsamoro barangays in Bangsamoro remains outside the scope of the Bangsamoro police until the barangays are reorganized into new municipalities or merged with existing municipalities in Bangsamoro.

== Divisions ==
=== Provincial and City Offices ===
The PNP PRO BAR has five police provincials under it. Among the localities in Bangsamoro and Cotabato City are the only localities to have a dedicated police district.

Current Seal	Provincial and City	Jurisdiction
	Basilan Police Provincial Office (Basilan PPO)	11 Municipalities; Isabela; Lamitan
	Lanao del Sur Police Provincial Office (Lanao del Sur PPO)	39 Municipalities; Marawi
	Maguindanao del Norte Police Provincial Office (Maguindanao del Norte PPO)	12 Municipalities
	Maguindanao del Sur Police Provincial Office (Maguindanao del Sur PPO)	24 Municipalities
	Tawi-Tawi Police Provincial Office (Tawi-Tawi PPO)	11 Municipalities
	Cotabato City Police Office (Cotabato CPO)	Cotabato City

== List of Regional Directors ==
- John Guyguyon (2022–2023)
- Francis Gorobia Tria (2023–present; OIC)
