= Cotabato Regional and Medical Center =

Government hospital in Cotabato City, Philippines

- Department of Health
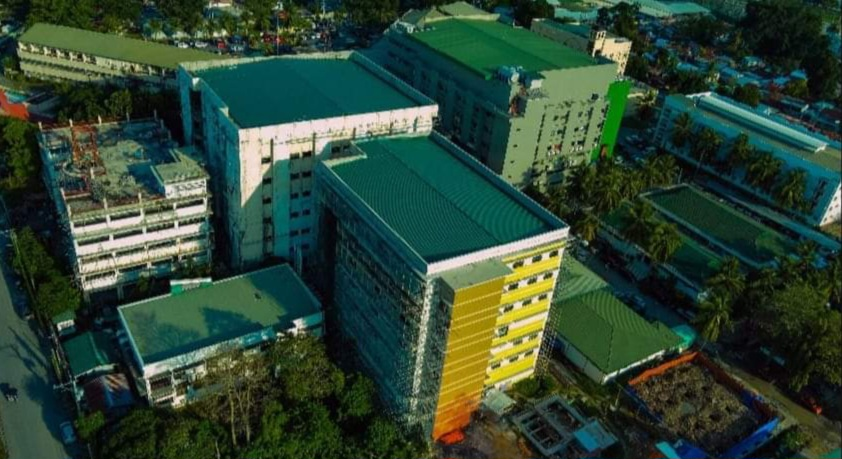
- Cotabato Regional and Medical Center Main Building

Geography
- Location: Cotabato City, Bangsamoro, Philippines
- Coordinates: 7°12′01″N 124°14′12″E

Organization
- Care system: Public, Philippine Health Insurance Corporation (PhilHealth) accredited
- Type: Tertiary

Services
- Standards: Philippine Department of Health
- Beds: 600

History
- Former names: Cotabato Hospital; Cotabato Regional Hospital
- Founded: 1916

Links
- Website: www.crmc.doh.gov.ph

The Cotabato Regional and Medical Center (CRMC) is a government-owned hospital situated in Cotabato City which serves both the main land Bangsamoro region and Central Mindanao of the Philippines.

== History ==
The Cotabato Regional and Medical Center was established in 1916 as the Cotabato Hospital which had a capacity of 12 beds in a house in the then municipality of Cotabato. The hospital was transferred to PC Hill and was funded by the Insular Government. On October 7, 1917, Dr. Vicente Kierulf became the head of the hospital. He was the first civilian District Health Officer of Cotabato province.

The hospital gradually expanded its capacity to 150 beds. The hospital was closed in 1942 after a series of burning and in 1944 when American Forces started bombing the town of Cotabato. In February 1973 Health Secretary Clemente Gatmaitan issued DOH-DO No. 60-B, s.1973 upgrading Cotabato Hospital to a 200-bed capacity facility and accredited it as a Tertiary, Teaching, and Training hospital.

Gatmaitan approved the acquisition of a new site in 1975 which had an area of 101,611 m^{2} (1,093,730 sq ft; 10.1611 ha) from the Canizares Estate. Construction of new buildings were started in 1980 and completed and occupied on November 3, 1983.

By virtue of Republic Act 8316, the hospital was again upgraded into a 400-bed capacity medical center and named Cotabato Regional and Medical Center and was approved as Level IV Tertiary, Teaching, and Training hospital.

Through the years the actual implementing be was 350 beds to 375 beds with the same budgetary allocation for 200 beds. In 1994, due to increasing demands in health services, the CRMC underwent health facility improvement with the construction of an annex where the emergency room, orthopedic ward, operating and recovery rooms, and delivery rooms are located.

In 2010, the 25 bed Mental Health Unit Building for in-patient and out-patient mental health services was completed. Further health facility enhancement was accomplished by the construction of Oxygen Generating Plant and the DILANGALEN Cancer Care Center. The Emergency Room was expanded to 35-stretcher bed in 2011, with centralized air conditioning.

In May 2014, the Sec. Enrique T. Ona Wing with 25 single (standard and suite) rooms and an elevator shaft was completed. With the AO 2012-0012 dated July 18, 2012, DOH new classification of hospitals and other health facilities in the Philippines, the Cotabato Regional and Medical Center is classified as a Level III Teaching and Training Hospital.
