= Ministry of Health (Bangsamoro) =

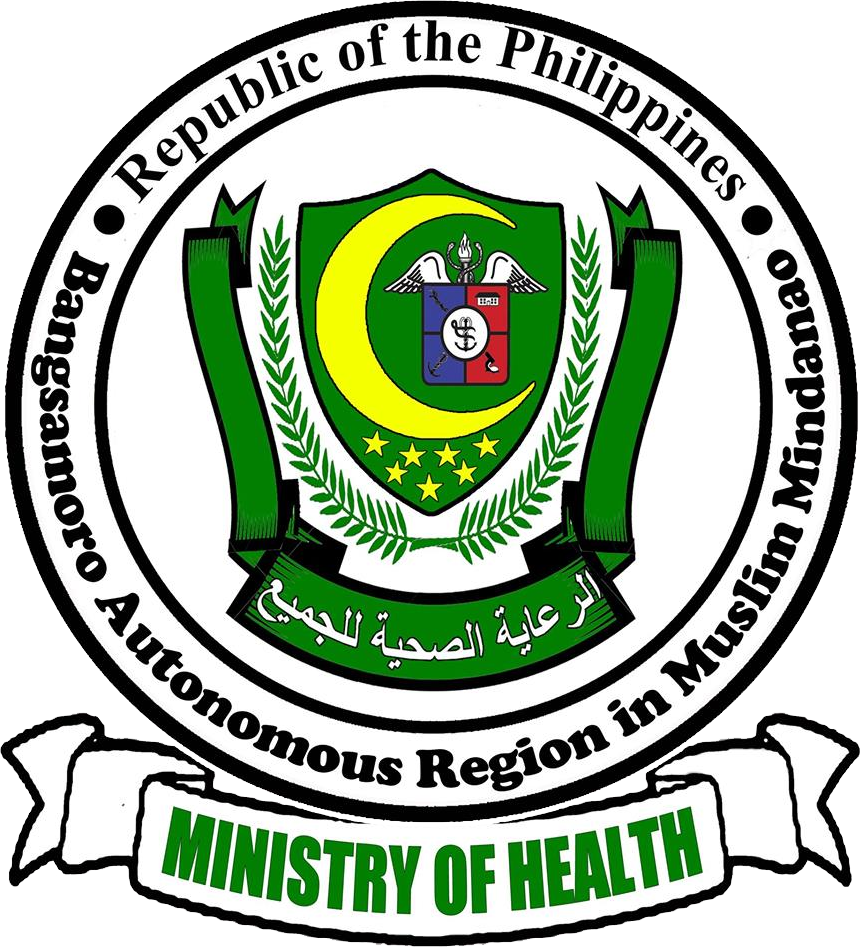

Agency overview
- Jurisdiction: Regional government of Bangsamoro
- Minister responsible: Kadil Sinolinding Jr., Minister of Health
- Website: moh.bangsamoro.gov.ph

The Ministry of Health (MOH) is the regional executive department of the Bangsamoro Autonomous Region in Muslim Mindanao (BARMM) for health affairs in the region.

The ministry was reorganized from the former regional office of the Department of Health in the former Autonomous Region in Muslim Mindanao (ARMM). The first Minister is Safrullah Dipatuan who was appointed by Murad Ebrahim on February 26, 2019.

== Ministers ==
#	Minister	Term began	Term ended	Chief Minister
1	Saffrullah Dipatuan	February 26, 2019	2020	Murad Ebrahim
Ameril S. Usman was OIC Minister from late 2020 to March 31, 2021
2	Bashary Latiph	March 31, 2021	2022 (Note: In February 8, 2022, ministers were directed to tender courtesy resignation as part of a cabinet reshuffle.)	Murad Ebrahim
Zul Qarneyn Abas is OIC from early 2022 (Note: Abas appointment was publicized on March 14, 2022.) until Piang's appointment
3	Rizaldy Piang	November 9, 2022	2024	Murad Ebrahim
4	Kadil Sinolinding Jr.	May 6, 2024	incumbent	Murad Ebrahim
4	Kadil Sinolinding Jr.	May 6, 2024	incumbent	Abdulraof Macacua
