= Ministry of Public Works (Bangsamoro) =

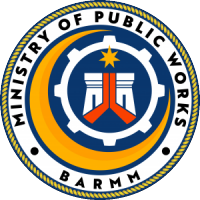

Agency overview
- Preceding agency: DPWH–ARMM
- Jurisdiction: Regional government of Bangsamoro
- Headquarters: BARMM Complex, Cotabato City
- Minister responsible: Eduard Guerra, Minister of Public Works
- Website: mpw.bangsamoro.gov.ph

The Ministry of Public Works (MPW) is the regional executive department of the Bangsamoro Autonomous Region in Muslim Mindanao (BARMM) responsible for affairs relating to the construction and maintenance of government infrastructure in the region.

== History ==
When the ARMM was succeeded by the Bangsamoro Autonomous Region in Muslim Mindanao (BARMM) in 2019, the regional departments of the former Autonomous Region in Muslim Mindanao were reconfigured into ministries of Bangsamoro. The Ministry of Public Works succeeded from the ARMM regional office of the Department of Public Works and Highways.

Bangsamoro Interim Chief Minister Murad Ebrahim appointed himself as Minister of Public Works. Murad took over the DPWH–ARMM, which was reorganized into the Ministry of Public Works on February 26, 2019 in an official turnover ceremony. On November 11, 2019 as part of a cabinet reshuffle, Ebrahim transferred Finance Eduard Guerra to the MPW and named him as Public Works Minister.

== Role ==
The Ministry of Public Works is responsible for affairs relating to public works particularly the construction maintenance of infrastructure related to roads, ports, flood control and shore protection, and water resource development system in Bangsamoro. It also issues safety regulation covering both public and private structures in the region.

== Organization ==
The ministry's operation is aided by eight District Engineering Offices, four each in the Basulta and Mainland areas, and four Area Equipment Services.

=== District Engineering Offices ===
Basulta

- Basilan District Engineering Office
- Sulu 1st District Engineering Office
- Sulu 2nd District Engineering Office
- Tawi-Tawi District Engineering Office

Mainland

- Maguindanao 1st District Engineering Office
- Maguindanao 2nd District Engineering Office
- Lanao del Sur 1st District Engineering Office
- Lanao del Sur 2nd District Engineering Office

=== Area Equipment Services ===
- Sulu Area Equipment Services
- Tawi-Tawi Area Equipment Services
- Maguindanao Area Equipment Services
- Lanao Area Equipment Services

== Ministers ==
| # | Minister | Term began | Term ended | Chief Minister |
|---|---|---|---|---|
| 1 | Murad Ebrahim | February 26, 2019 | November 11, 2019 | Himself |
| 2 | Eduard Guerra | November 11, 2019 | incumbent | Murad Ebrahim |
