= Cynthia Guiani =

Filipino politician

Mayor of Cotabato City
- In office September 23, 2016 – June 30, 2022
- Preceded by: Japal Guiani Jr.
- Succeeded by: Mohammad Ali Matabalao

Personal details
- Born: Frances Cynthia Guiani; 1964 or 1965 (age 61–62)
- Spouse: Umbra Sayad
- Children: 3
- Education: University of Mindanao

Frances Cynthia Guiani-Sayadi is a Filipino politician who was mayor of Cotabato City from 2019 to 2022.

== Education ==
Guiani is a lawyer by profession, having obtained her law degree *cum laude* at the University of Mindanao in Davao City.

== Career ==
=== First term (2016–2019) ===
In the 2016 local elections, Guianiwas elected vice mayor of Cotabato City. Her brother, Japal Guiani Jr., was re-elected as mayor for a third term but he died a few months later on September 22, 2016 due to cardiac arrest. His sister took over as mayor as per local government succession rules and took oath the following day. She would serve the remaining term of herbrother.

Guiani would continue the policies of her brother while adding modifications. She aimed to improve the standards of living in her city. She had an iron fist policy in dealing with crime and illegal drug use in the city favoring night patrols or ronda and implementing a curfew for minors.

She was mayor of Cotabato City when the early 2019 two-round plebiscite which seek to establish the Bangsamoro autonomous region to be led by the Moro Islamic Liberation Front (MILF). Guiani campaigned against the inclusion of Cotabato City in the then proposed region but voters favored both the establishment of the new region and the inclusion of the city to it. After the results became known, she publicly expressed intention to file a formal protest to the Commission on Elections.

=== Second term (2019–2022) ===
Guani would run in the 2019 elections for mayor. Her bid was successful becoming the first ever woman to be elected as Cotabato City mayor. She vowed to continue her policy against crime, particularly her ronda program.

She would take a critical stance against the Bangsamoro regional government. The Bangsamoro regional government has pushed for the formal turnover of Cotabato City to the region as soon as possible while Mayor Guani has formally requested President Rodrigo Duterte to defer the transfer of the city to Bangsamoro until June 30, 2022, when it is expected that the "BARMM bureaucracy would have been fully operational" or the original formal end of the transition period. The ceremonial turnover of the city to the Bangsamoro regional government would take place on December 20, 2020, which she did not attend. She also opposed the extension of the transition period to 2025, when it was still a proposal.

She would take part in the 2022 elections to secure a second regular term. She filed a disqualification case against her political rival Mohammad Ali Matabalao alleging his campaign of engaging in vote buying Guani would lose to Matabalao. She filed the case before the Commission on Election en banc but withdrew it and instead filed it with the Second Division which dismissed it for lack of jurisdiction. The city council under Matabalao's administration formally affirmed the 2019 plebiscite which led to Cotabato City's inclusion to the Bangsamoro.

== Personal life ==
Guiani is married to Umbra Sayadi and they have three children. Her husband works for the National Food Authority.
