= Legislative districts of Maguindanao del Norte =

Legislative district

The legislative district of Maguindanao del Norte were the representations of the province of Maguindanao del Norte and the independent component city of Cotabato in the various national legislatures of the Philippines. The province and the city were represented in the lower house of the Congress of the Philippines through their lone congressional district.

== History ==
Before gaining separate representation, areas now under the jurisdiction of Maguindanao del Norte were represented under the Department of Mindanao and Sulu (1917–1935), Cotabato (1935–1972) and Maguindanao (1984–2007, 2010–2022).

The enactment of Presidential Decree No. 341 on November 22, 1973, created the province of Maguindanao out of Cotabato's Maguindanao-majority municipalities. The new province was represented in the Interim Batasang Pambansa as part of Region XII from 1978 to 1984.

Maguindanao del Norte (including Cotabato City) first gained separate representation in 1984, when it returned two representatives, elected at large, to the Regular Batasang Pambansa.

Under the new Constitution which was proclaimed on February 11, 1987, Maguindanao del Norte, including Cotabato City, was retained into one congressional district; each elected its member to the restored House of Representatives starting that same year.

The province of Shariff Kabunsuan, established with the passage of Muslim Mindanao Autonomy Act No. 201 and its subsequent approval by plebiscite, was created out of Maguindanao's western municipalities in 2006. Per Section 5 of MMA Act No. 201, Cotabato City was grouped with Shariff Kabunsuan to elect a congressional representative. It was this specific provision that became the subject of the Supreme Court case that ultimately voided MMA Act No. 201 for being unconstitutional, and leading to the disestablishment of the Shariff Kabunsuan in 2008 and the return of its territory to Maguindanao. In the brief period of Shariff Kabunsuan's existence, the First District of Maguindanao—Cotabato City was known as the Lone District of Shariff Kabunsuan—Cotabato City.

The enactment of Republic Act No. 11550 on May 28, 2021, separated the former province of Maguindanao into the provinces of Maguindanao del Norte and Maguindanao del Sur and its subsequent ratification by plebiscite on September 17, 2022, separated from Maguindanao's first district 1 city and 11 municipalities to create the province of Maguindanao del Norte. Per Section 9 of R.A. 11550, the new province was to comprise a single congressional district; voters began to elect the new province's separate representative beginning in 2025.

== Lone District ==
- City: Cotabato City
- Municipality: Barira, Buldon, Datu Blah T. Sinsuat, Datu Odin Sinsuat, Kabuntalan, Matanog, Northern Kabuntalan, Parang, Sultan Kudarat, Sultan Mastura, Upi
- Population: 926,037 (2020)
- Electorate: 484,349 (2022)

Period	Representative
19th Congress; 2022–2025	Sittie Shahara I. Mastura

== See also ==
- Legislative districts of Mindanao and Sulu
- Legislative districts of Cotabato
- Legislative districts of Maguindanao
