= Maguindanao's 1st congressional district =

Legislative district of the Philippines

- Former constituency for the House of Representatives of the Philippines
- Location of Maguindanao within the Philippines
- Province: Maguindanao
- Region: Bangsamoro
- Population: 821,475 (2015)
- Electorate: 484,349 (2022)
- Major settlements: 12 LGUs: Cities; Cotabato City; Municipalities; Barira; Buldon; Datu Blah T. Sinsuat; Datu Odin Sinsuat; Kabuntalan; Matanog; Northern Kabuntalan; Parang; Sultan Kudarat; Sultan Mastura; Upi
- Area: 3,988.82 km^{2} (1,540.09 sq mi)

Former constituency
- Created: 1987
- Abolished: 2022

Maguindanao's 1st congressional district was one of the two congressional districts of the Philippines in the province of Maguindanao. It was represented in the House of Representatives from 1987 to 2022. The district stretched along the Moro Gulf coast of western Maguindanao and includes Cotabato City, an independent port city. Barira, Buldon, Datu Blah T. Sinsuat, Datu Odin Sinsuat, Kabuntalan, Matanog, Northern Kabuntalan, Parang, Sultan Kudarat, Sultan Mastura and Upi are the district's constituent municipalities. From 2006 to 2008, the district was briefly replaced by the lone district of Shariff Kabunsuan, a short-lived province that was carved out of the same area in Maguindanao and which was eventually nullified by the Supreme Court. It was last represented in the 19th Congress by Sittie Shahara Mastura of Lakas-CMD, who was later redistricted to at-large district of the newly established province of Maguindanao del Norte in 2022.

== Representation history ==
| # | Image | Member | Term of office | | Congress | Party | Electoral history | Constituent LGUs |
| # | Image | Member | Start | End | Congress | Party | Electoral history | Constituent LGUs |
|---|---|---|---|---|---|---|---|---|
=== Maguindanao's 1st district for the House of Representatives of the Philippines ===
District created February 2, 1987 from Maguindanao's at-large district.
| 1 | | Michael O. Mastura | June 30, 1987 | June 30, 1995 | 8th | PDP–Laban | Elected in 1987. | 1987–1995; Barira, Buldon, Cotabato City, Dinaig, Kabuntalan, Matanog, Parang, Sultan Kudarat, Upi |
| 1 | | Michael O. Mastura | June 30, 1987 | June 30, 1995 | 9th | LDP | Re-elected in 1992. | 1987–1995; Barira, Buldon, Cotabato City, Dinaig, Kabuntalan, Matanog, Parang, Sultan Kudarat, Upi |
| 1 | | Michael O. Mastura | June 30, 1987 | June 30, 1995 | 9th | Lakas | Re-elected in 1992. | 1987–1995; Barira, Buldon, Cotabato City, Dinaig, Kabuntalan, Matanog, Parang, Sultan Kudarat, Upi |
| — | vacant | | June 30, 1995 | March 26, 1996 | 10th | – | Electoral protest by Michael Mastura (Lakas) delayed proclamation of 1995 election winner. | 1995–2004; Barira, Buldon, Cotabato City, Datu Odin Sinsuat, Kabuntalan, Matanog, Parang, Sultan Kudarat, Upi |
| 2 | | Didagen P. Dilangalen | March 26, 1996 | June 30, 2004 | 10th | PMP | Declared winner of 1995 election. | 1995–2004; Barira, Buldon, Cotabato City, Datu Odin Sinsuat, Kabuntalan, Matanog, Parang, Sultan Kudarat, Upi |
| 2 | | Didagen P. Dilangalen | March 26, 1996 | June 30, 2004 | 11th | LAMMP | Re-elected in 1998. | 1995–2004; Barira, Buldon, Cotabato City, Datu Odin Sinsuat, Kabuntalan, Matanog, Parang, Sultan Kudarat, Upi |
| 2 | | Didagen P. Dilangalen | March 26, 1996 | June 30, 2004 | 12th | PMP | Re-elected in 2001. | 1995–2004; Barira, Buldon, Cotabato City, Datu Odin Sinsuat, Kabuntalan, Matanog, Parang, Sultan Kudarat, Upi |
| 3 | | Bai Sendig G. Dilangalen | June 30, 2004 | June 30, 2007 | 13th | PMP | Elected in 2004. | 2004–2007; Barira, Buldon, Cotabato City, Datu Odin Sinsuat, Kabuntalan, Matanog, Parang, Sultan Kudarat, Sultan Mastura, Upi |
District dissolved into Shariff Kabunsuan's at-large congressional district.
District re-created July 16, 2008.
| (2) | | Didagen P. Dilangalen | July 16, 2008 | June 30, 2010 | 14th | PMP | Redistricted from Shariff Kabunsuan's at-large district. | 2008–2022; Barira, Buldon, Cotabato City, Datu Blah T. Sinsuat, Datu Odin Sinsuat, Kabuntalan, Matanog, Northern Kabuntalan, Parang, Sultan Kudarat, Sultan Mastura, Upi |
| 4 | | Bai Sandra Sema | June 30, 2010 | June 30, 2019 | 15th | Liberal | Elected in 2010. | 2008–2022; Barira, Buldon, Cotabato City, Datu Blah T. Sinsuat, Datu Odin Sinsuat, Kabuntalan, Matanog, Northern Kabuntalan, Parang, Sultan Kudarat, Sultan Mastura, Upi |
| 4 | | Bai Sandra Sema | June 30, 2010 | June 30, 2019 | 16th | Liberal | Re-elected in 2013. | 2008–2022; Barira, Buldon, Cotabato City, Datu Blah T. Sinsuat, Datu Odin Sinsuat, Kabuntalan, Matanog, Northern Kabuntalan, Parang, Sultan Kudarat, Sultan Mastura, Upi |
| 4 | | Bai Sandra Sema | June 30, 2010 | June 30, 2019 | 17th | PDP–Laban | Re-elected in 2016. | 2008–2022; Barira, Buldon, Cotabato City, Datu Blah T. Sinsuat, Datu Odin Sinsuat, Kabuntalan, Matanog, Northern Kabuntalan, Parang, Sultan Kudarat, Sultan Mastura, Upi |
| 5 | | Roonie Q. Sinsuat Sr. | June 30, 2019 | June 30, 2022 | 18th | PDP–Laban | Elected in 2019. | 2008–2022; Barira, Buldon, Cotabato City, Datu Blah T. Sinsuat, Datu Odin Sinsuat, Kabuntalan, Matanog, Northern Kabuntalan, Parang, Sultan Kudarat, Sultan Mastura, Upi |
| 5 | | Roonie Q. Sinsuat Sr. | June 30, 2019 | June 30, 2022 | 18th | UBJP | Elected in 2019. | 2008–2022; Barira, Buldon, Cotabato City, Datu Blah T. Sinsuat, Datu Odin Sinsuat, Kabuntalan, Matanog, Northern Kabuntalan, Parang, Sultan Kudarat, Sultan Mastura, Upi |
| 6 | | Sittie Shahara I. Mastura | June 30, 2022 | September 18, 2022 | 19th | Lakas | Elected in 2022. Redistricted to Maguindanao del Norte's at-large district. | 2008–2022; Barira, Buldon, Cotabato City, Datu Blah T. Sinsuat, Datu Odin Sinsuat, Kabuntalan, Matanog, Northern Kabuntalan, Parang, Sultan Kudarat, Sultan Mastura, Upi |
District dissolved into Maguindanao del Norte's at-large congressional district.

== See also ==
- Legislative districts of Maguindanao
- Maguindanao del Norte's at-large congressional district
