= 2006 Shariff Kabunsuan creation plebiscite =

- October 28, 2006
- Do you approve of the creation of the province of Shariff Kabunsuan, into a distinct and independent province comprising the municipalities of Barira, Buldon, Datu Odin Sinsuat, Kabuntalan, Matanog, Parang, Sultan Kudarat, Sultan Mastura, Upi and Datu Blah T. Sinsuat in the province of Maguindanao, pursuant to MMA Act No. 201?

Results
Choice	Votes	%
Yes	285,372	97.01%
No	8,802	2.99%
Total votes	294,174	100.00%

The Shariff Kabunsuan creation plebiscite was a plebiscite on the creation of the Province of Shariff Kabunsuan in the Philippines. The plebiscite was conducted on October 28, 2006 and results were announced on October 31, 2006.

The proposed province — named after Sharif Mohammed Kabungsuwan, an Arab-Malay Islamic preacher who introduced Islam to central Mindanao in the 16th century, — was established under Muslim Mindanao Autonomy Act No. 201 which was signed into law by ARMM Regional Governor Zaldy Ampatuan on September 7, 2006. MMAA 201 provided for the creation of a new province comprising the nine municipalities of Barira, Buldon, Datu Odin Sinsuat, Kabuntalan, Matanog, Parang, Sultan Kudarat, Sultan Mastura, and Upi, all of the first legislative district of the province of Maguindanao. A tenth municipality, Datu Blah T. Sinsuat, was created within the proposed province on September 16, 2006, weeks prior to the actual plebiscite for the creation of the province.

Maguindanao Governor Datu Andal Ampatuan Sr. originally pushed for the creation of the new province to "decentralize governance and maximize development in poor Muslim communities, most of which have been areas of armed conflict for decades." He and his son ARMM Regional Governor Zaldy Ampatuan, campaigned for the creation of Shariff Kabunsuan to better extend government services to residents, particularly those in the "precipitous" parts of the area.

== Referendum question ==
The Shariff Kabunsuan creation plebiscite was supervised and officiated by the COMELEC pursuant to Resolution No. 7727.

The question of the said plebiscite was:

DO YOU APPROVE OF THE CREATION OF THE PROVINCE OF SHARIFF KABUNSUAN, INTO A DISTINCT AND INDEPENDENT PROVINCE COMPRISING THE MUNICIPALITIES OF BARIRA, BULDON, DATU ODIN SINSUAT, KABUNTALAN, MATANOG, PARANG, SULTAN KUDARAT, SULTAN MASTURA, UPI AND DATU BLAH T. SINSUAT IN THE PROVINCE OF MAGUINDANAO, PURSUANT TO MMA ACT NO. 201?

== Results ==
Do you approve the creation of the Province of Shariff Kabunsuan?
Choice	Votes	%
For	285,372	97.01
Against	8,802	2.99
Required majority		50.00
Total	294,174	100.00
Source: Philippine Information Agency

The following municipalities seceded from Maguindanao and formed the new province. All of them were from the first legislative district of Maguindanao.

- Barira
- Buldon
- Datu Blah T. Sinsuat
- Datu Odin Sinsuat
- Kabuntalan
- Matanog
- Parang
- Sultan Kudarat
- Sultan Mastura
- Upi

Datu Odin Sinsuat was designated the capital of the new province, per Section 1 of MMA Act 201.

The province was the first to be created under Republic Act No. 9054 or the Expanded ARMM law.

== Aftermath ==
By 2008, in Sema v. COMELEC and Dilangalen, the Supreme Court ruled the creation of the province as unconstitutional, as the constitution only gives Congress the power of creating legislative districts; this means that provinces and cities, which are made up of legislative districts, can only be created by a Republic Act made by Congress. This led to the province being reverted to Maguindanao.

== See also ==
- 2021 Maguindanao division plebiscite
