= Sema v. COMELEC and Dilangalen =

Philippine legal case

- Court: Supreme Court of the Philippines en banc

Full case name
- Bai Sandra S. A. Sema v. Commission on Elections and Didagen P. Dilangalen Perfecto F. Marquez v. COMELEC
- Decided: July 16, 2008
- G.R. numbers: 177597 and 178628
- Citation: 580 Phil. 623; 558 SCRA 700

Case history
- Subsequent action(s): Motion for reconsideration denied January 9, 2009
- Ponente: Antonio Carpio
- Concurrence: 7 C.J. Puno, Quisumbing, Austria-Martinez, Corona, Carpio Morales, Nachura and J. Reyes
- Dissent: 6 Ynares-Santiago, Azcuna, Tinga, Chico-Nazario, Leonardo-De Castro and Brion

Sema v. COMELEC and Dilangalen, 580 Phil. 623 (2008), is a court case that was ruled on by the Supreme Court of the Philippines on July 16, 2008. It was consolidated with Marquez v. COMELEC (G.R. No. 178628). It held that the Regional Assembly of the Autonomous Region in Muslim Mindanao does not have the power to create provinces and cities. Thus, the creation of the province of Shariff Kabunsuan was unconstitutional ab initio and that province no longer exists as a political entity in the Philippines. All its employees and officials, elected or otherwise, were declared as not holding validly created offices.

== The cases ==
These consolidated certiorari, prohibition, mandamus and declaratory relief petitions sought the annulment of Commission on Elections "Resolution No. 7902" (May 10, 2007), treating Cotabato City as part of the legislative district of Shariff Kabunsuan.

In G.R. No. 177597, Bai Sandra Sema (Sema), asked the COMELEC "to exclude from the canvassing the votes cast in Cotabato City for representative of the legislative district in question in the 2007 Philippine general election." In G.R. No. 178628, Perfecto Marquez, asked the Court "to order the COMELEC to conduct a special election for representative of the 'First District of Maguindanao with Cotabato City'".

== The facts ==
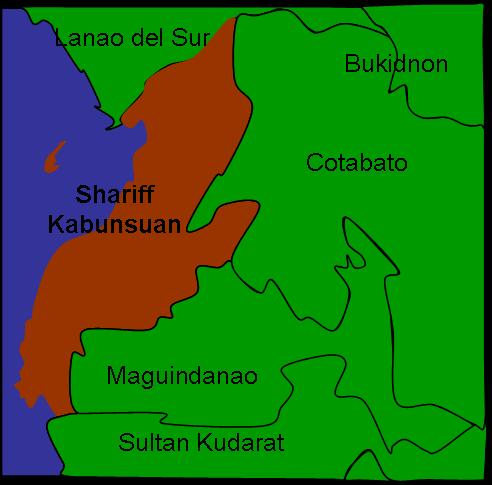
Shariff Kabunsuan

The Ordinance appended to the 1987 Constitution of the Philippines apportioned 2 legislative districts for Maguindanao. The first consists of Cotabato City and 8 municipalities. Maguindanao forms part of the Autonomous Region in Muslim Mindanao (ARMM), created under its Organic Act, Republic Act No. 6734 (RA 6734), as amended by Republic Act No. 9054 (RA 9054). Cotabato City, as part of Maguindanao's first legislative district, is not part of the ARMM but of Region XII (having voted against its inclusion in November 1989 plebiscite).

On August 28, 2006, the ARMM's legislature, the ARMM Regional Assembly, exercising its power to create provinces under Section 19, Article VI of RA 9054, enacted Muslim Mindanao Autonomy Act No. 201 (MMA Act No. 201) creating the Province of Shariff Kabunsuan composed of the 8 municipalities in the first district of Maguindanao.

Later, 2 new municipalities were carved out of the original 9, constituting Shariff Kabunsuan, resulting to total of 11. Cotabato City is not part of Maguindanao. Maguindanao voters ratified Shariff Kabunsuan's creation in an October 29, 2006, plebiscite.

On February 6, 2007, Cotabato City passed Board Resolution No. 3999, requesting the COMELEC to "clarify the status of Cotabato City in view of the conversion of the First District of Maguindanao into a regular province" under MMA Act No. 201. The COMELEC issued Resolution No. 07-0407 on March 6, 2007 "maintaining the status quo with Cotabato City as part of Shariff Kabunsuan in the First Legislative District of Maguindanao." Resolution No. 07-0407, adopted the COMELEC's Law Department recommendation under a Memorandum dated February 27, 2007. The COMELEC issued on March 29, 2007, Resolution No. 7845 stating that Maguindanao's first legislative district is composed only of Cotabato City because of the enactment of MMA Act No. 201.

On May 10, 2007, the COMELEC issued Resolution No. 7902 (subject of these cases), amending Resolution No. 07-0407 by renaming the legislative district in question as "Shariff Kabunsuan Province with Cotabato City (formerly First District of Maguindanao with Cotabato City)."

Meanwhile, the Shariff Kabunsuan creation plebiscite was supervised and officiated by the COMELEC pursuant to Resolution No. 7727.

Option	Votes
In favor for creation	285,372
Against the creation	8,802

The following municipalities seceded from Maguindanao and formed the new province. All of them were from the first legislative district of Maguindanao.

- Barira
- Buldon
- Datu Blah T. Sinsuat
- Datu Odin Sinsuat
- Kabuntalan
- Matanog
- Northern Kabuntalan
- Parang
- Sultan Kudarat
- Sultan Mastura
- Upi

Kabuntalan was chosen as the capital of the new province. The province was the first to be created under Republic Act No. 9054 or the Expanded ARMM law.

Sandra Sema questioned COMELEC Resolution 7902 which combined Shariff Kabunsuan and Cotabato City into a single legislative district during the 2007 Philippine general election. Sema lost to incumbent Congress representative of the Shariff Kabunsuan and Cotabato district, Didagen Dilangalen.

== Issues ==
The Court was asked to rule on "whether Section 19, Article VI of RA 9054, delegating to the ARMM Regional Assembly the power to create provinces, cities, municipalities and barangays, is constitutional; and if in the affirmative, whether a province created by the ARMM Regional Assembly under MMA Act No. 201 pursuant to Section 19, Article VI of RA 9054 is entitled to one representative in the House of Representatives without need of a national law creating a legislative district for such province."

Further, the High Tribunal had to render judgment on "whether COMELEC Resolution No. 7902 is valid for maintaining the status quo in the first legislative district of Maguindanao (as “Shariff Kabunsuan Province with Cotabato City [formerly First District of Maguindanao with Cotabato City]”), despite the creation of the Province of Shariff Kabunsuan out of such district (excluding Cotabato City)."

== Conclusion ==
On July 16, 2008, the Supreme Court of the Philippines's 33-page judgment (8-6) penned by Antonio Carpio annulled the "Muslim Mindanao Autonomy Act No. 201", which created Shariff Kabunsuan (carved out of Maguindanao, Autonomous Region in Muslim Mindanao). Justice Antonio Carpio opined: "We rule that (1) Section 19, Article VI of RA 9054 is unconstitutional insofar as it grants to the ARMM Regional Assembly the power to create provinces and cities; (2) MMA Act No. 201 creating the Province of Shariff Kabunsuan is void; and (3) COMELEC Resolution No. 7902 is valid."

Carpio stressed that “only Congress can create provinces and cities because the creation of provinces and cities necessarily includes the creation of legislative districts. Creation of province or a city inherently involves the power to create a legislative district. The Constitution mandates that a province or a city with at least 250,000 inhabitants is entitled to at least one representative."

The Court also declared unconstitutional the RLA’s power to create provinces and cities in the region but it did not pass upon the constitutionality of the creation of new municipalities and barangays. Under Republic Act No. 9140 or the Expanded ARMM Law, the RLA has the power to create new LGUs and to set its own criteria in creating, dividing, merging, or abolishing LGUs.

Carpio further ruled that "in the present 14th Congress, there are 219 district representatives out of the maximum 250 seats in the House of Representatives. Since party-list members shall constitute 20 percent of total membership of the House, there should at least be 50 party-list seats available in every election in case 50 party-list candidates are proclaimed winners. This leaves only 200 seats for district representatives, much less than the 219 incumbent district representatives. Thus, there is a need now for Congress to increase by law the allowable membership of the House, even before Congress can create new provinces."

=== Summary ===
Carpio tersely put the judgment in this manner: "In summary, we rule that Section 19, Article VI of RA 9054, insofar as it grants to the ARMM Regional Assembly the power to create provinces and cities, is void for being contrary to Section 5 of Article VI and Section 20 of Article X of the Constitution, as well as Section 3 of the Ordinance appended to the Constitution. Only Congress can create provinces and cities because the creation of provinces and cities necessarily includes the creation of legislative districts, a power only Congress can exercise under Section 5, Article VI of the Constitution and Section 3 of the Ordinance appended to the Constitution. The ARMM Regional Assembly cannot create a province without a legislative district because the Constitution mandates that every province shall have a legislative district. Moreover, the ARMM Regional Assembly cannot enact a law creating a national office like the office of a district representative of Congress because the legislative powers of the ARMM Regional Assembly operate only within its territorial jurisdiction as provided in Section 20, Article X of the Constitution. Thus, we rule that MMA Act No. 201, enacted by the ARMM Regional Assembly and creating the Province of Shariff Kabunsuan, is void.

Consequently, we hold that COMELEC Resolution No. 7902, preserving the geographic and legislative district of the First District of Maguindanao with Cotabato City, is valid as it merely complies with Section 5 of Article VI and Section 20 of Article X of the Constitution, as well as Section 1 of the Ordinance appended to the Constitution."

== Aftermath ==
The landmark ruling resulted in the Philippines' reverting to 80 provinces. The ruling also nullified the elections of the governor, vice governor and provincial board of Shariff Kabunsuan and the entire provincial bureaucracy is deemed scrapped as Shariff Kabunsuan reverts as integral part of Maguindanao.

Uncertainty loomed about the legal fate of local elected provincial officials in Shariff Kabunsuan. Among the proclaimed winners in the 2007 local election are 2 board members and the vice governor. Former Sultan Kudarat mayor and 2007 Shariff Kabunsuan gubernatorial candidate Tucao Mastura said: "What will happen to the elected governor, vice governor, and board members? We cannot afford to be under a governor not elected by the people of Shariff Kabunsuan." Rep. Didagen Dilangalen of Shariff Kabunsuan, meanwhile, said "there is a need to declare vacant the position of governor, vice-governor, and board members in new Maguindanao province. There is no election held for the purpose of electing officials in the undivided Maguindanao. The election held there (Maguindanao) is an exercise in futility."

Autonomous Region in Muslim Mindanao (ARMM) leaders on July 16, 2008, warned that the Court ruling would cause leadership problem and unemployment in the province, for it will cause some of the elected officials and government employees in Shariff Kabunsuan to lose their jobs. Sema v. Comelec reduced the number of provinces in ARMM to 5. ARMM is composed of Maguindanao (excluding Cotabato City), Tawi-Tawi, Sulu, Lanao del Sur, Basilan (excluding Isabela City) and the city of Marawi.

Maguindanao Gov. Datu Andal Ampatuan Sr, however, would welcome the judgment, for it reverted to the old province. Two crucial sources of income covered by Shariff Kabunsuan: the Parang seaport and Awang Airport in Datu Odin Sinsuat.

Shariff Kabunsuan Vice Governor Ibrahim Ibay said that "among those severely affected by the decision are the more than 400 government employees in his province, half of which used to work in the old Maguindanao provincial government. What will happen to them? We dreamed for a separate province and now it is voided."

The ruling also affected the conduct of automated elections in the region in August, since Shariff Kabunsuan and Maguindanao were expected to use different kinds of machine for the elections. Maguindanao was to use a direct recording electronic technology that uses a touch-screen technology for voting, while Shariff Kabunsuan, along with other ARMM provinces, was ti use optical mark reader technology, which required voters to use a paper-based ballot to be fed to a machine.

== See also ==
- Autonomous Region in Muslim Mindanao
- 2006 Shariff Kabunsuan creation plebiscite
- Commission on Elections
- Separate Concurring and Dissenting Opinion, J. Tinga
