= Legislative districts of Maguindanao =

Legislative districts in the Philippines

The legislative districts of Maguindanao were the representations of the province of Maguindanao and the independent component city of Cotabato in the various national legislatures of the Philippines. The province and the city were represented in the lower house of the Congress of the Philippines through their first and second congressional districts from 1987–2022.

== History ==
Prior to gaining separate representation, areas now under the jurisdiction of Maguindanao were represented under the Department of Mindanao and Sulu (1917–1935) and Cotabato (1935–1972).

The enactment of Presidential Decree No. 341 on November 22, 1973, created the Province of Maguindanao out of Cotabato's Maguindanao-majority municipalities. The new province was represented in the Interim Batasang Pambansa as part of Region XII from 1978 to 1984.

Maguindanao (including Cotabato City) first gained separate representation in 1984, when it returned two representatives, elected at large, to the Regular Batasang Pambansa.

Under the new Constitution which was proclaimed on February 11, 1987, the province, including Cotabato City, was reapportioned into two congressional districts; each elected its member to the restored House of Representatives starting that same year.

The province of Shariff Kabunsuan, established with the passage of Muslim Mindanao Autonomy Act No. 201 and its subsequent approval by plebiscite, was created out of Maguindanao's western municipalities in 2006. Per Section 5 of MMA Act No. 201, Cotabato City was grouped with Shariff Kabunsuan for the purpose of electing a congressional representative. It was this specific provision that became the subject of the Supreme Court case that ultimately voided MMA Act No. 201 for being unconstitutional, and leading to the disestablishment of the Shariff Kabunsuan in 2008 and the return of its territory to Maguindanao. In the brief period of Shariff Kabunsuan's existence the First District of Maguindanao—Cotabato City was known as the Lone District of Shariff Kabunsuan—Cotabato City, while the Second District was known as the Lone District of Maguindanao.

The districts were dissolved in 2022 following the division of Maguindanao and replaced by Maguindanao del Norte's at-large congressional district and Maguindanao del Sur's at-large congressional district

== 1st District (defunct) ==
- City: Cotabato City (Note: Independent from the province and does not vote for provincial officials. Only votes with Maguindanao for representation in the various national legislatures.)
- Municipalities: Barira, Buldon, Datu Odin Sinsuat, Kabuntalan, Matanog, Parang, Sultan Kudarat, Upi, Sultan Mastura (established 2003), Datu Blah T. Sinsuat (established 2006), Northern Kabuntalan (established 2006)
- Population (2020): 926,037

Period	Representative
8th Congress; 1987–1992	Michael O. Mastura
9th Congress; 1992–1995	Michael O. Mastura
10th Congress; 1995–1998	vacant
10th Congress; 1995–1998	Didagen Dilangalen (Note: Only took oath on March 26, 1996, following the resolution of legal battles surrounding the 1995 election results contested by Michael Mastura.)
11th Congress; 1998–2001	Didagen Dilangalen
12th Congress; 2001–2004	Didagen Dilangalen
13th Congress; 2004–2007	Bai Sendig G. Dilangalen
14th Congress; 2007–2010	Didagen P. Dilangalen (Note: Elected as representative of the district briefly designated as the Lone District of Shariff Kabunsuan—Cotabato City in 2007.)
15th Congress; 2010–2013	Bai Sandra A. Sema
16th Congress; 2013–2016	Bai Sandra A. Sema
17th Congress; 2016–2019	Bai Sandra A. Sema
18th Congress; 2019–2022	Datu Roonie Q. Sinsuat Sr.
19th Congress; 2022	Sittie Shahara I. Mastura

== 2nd District (defunct) ==
- Municipalities: Ampatuan, Buluan, Datu Paglas, Datu Piang, Pagalungan, Shariff Aguak, South Upi, Sultan sa Barongis, Talayan, General Salidapa K. Pendatun (established 1991), Mamasapano (established 1998), Talitay (established 1999), Datu Montawal (established 2000), Paglat (established 2001), Guindulungan (established 2003), Datu Saudi Ampatuan (established 2003), Datu Unsay (established 2003), Datu Abdullah Sangki (established 2004), Rajah Buayan (established 2004), Pandag (established 2006), Mangudadatu (established 2006), Datu Anggal Midtimbang (established 2006), Datu Hoffer Ampatuan (established 2009), Datu Salibo (established 2009), Shariff Saydona Mustapha (established 2009)
- Population (2020): 741,221

Period	Representative
8th Congress; 1987–1992	Guimid Matalam
9th Congress; 1992–1995	Simeon A. Datumanong (Note: Appointed Secretary of Public Works and Highways in 2001; seat remained vacant until the end of the 11th Congress.)
10th Congress; 1995–1998	Simeon A. Datumanong
11th Congress; 1998–2001	Simeon A. Datumanong
11th Congress; 1998–2001	vacant
12th Congress; 2001–2004	Guimid Matalam
13th Congress; 2004–2007	Simeon A. Datumanong (Note: Elected as representative of the district briefly designated as Lone District of Maguindanao in 2007.)
14th Congress; 2007–2010	Simeon A. Datumanong
15th Congress; 2010–2013	Simeon A. Datumanong
16th Congress; 2013–2016	Datu Zajid G. Mangudadatu
17th Congress; 2016–2019	Datu Zajid G. Mangudadatu
18th Congress; 2019–2022	Esmael G. Mangudadatu
19th Congress; 2022	Mohamad P. Paglas

== At-large (defunct) ==
Period	Representatives
Regular Batasang Pambansa; 1984–1986	Simeon A. Datumanong
Regular Batasang Pambansa; 1984–1986	Salipada K. Pendatun (Note: Died on January 27, 1985; seat remained vacant until the abolition of the Regular Batasang Pambansa in 1986.)

== See also ==
- Maguindanao del Norte's at-large congressional district
- Maguindanao del Sur's at-large congressional district
- Legislative district of Mindanao and Sulu
- Legislative district of Cotabato
