= Cotabato (historical province) =

Historical province of the Philippines

- Province of the Philippines
- 1914–1973
- Seal

- Location of the historical province of Cotabato.
- Capital: Cotabato City (1920-1966); Pagalungan (1966-1973)
- Area
- 24,916 km^{2} (9,620 sq mi)
- History
  - Established: 23 July 1914
  - Disestablished: 22 November 1973
- Political subdivisions: 38 (July 18, 1966 to November 22, 1973); Alamada; Ampatuan; Bagumbayan; Buldon; Buluan; Carmen; Columbio; Datu Paglas; Datu Piang; Dinaig; Esperanza; Isulan; Kabacan; Kalamansig; Kidapawan; Lebak; Libungan; Lutayan; Shariff Aguak; Magpet; Makilala; Mariano Marcos; Matalam; Midsayap; M'lang; Pagalungan; Palimbang; Parang; Pigcawayan; Pikit; President Quirino; President Roxas; Sultan Kudarat; Sultan sa Barongis; Tacurong; Tulunan; Kabuntalan; Upi; + 14; Banga; Cotabato City; General Santos; Glan; Kiamba; Koronadal; Maasim; Maitum; Norala; Polomolok; Surallah; Tampakan; Tantangan; Tupi; 5̅2̅ (before July 18, 1966)
Preceded by
Moro Province
Succeeded by
North Cotabato
South Cotabato
Maguindanao
Sultan Kudarat
- Today part of: · Cotabato · Maguindanao del Norte · Maguindanao del Sur · Sarangani · South Cotabato · Sultan Kudarat

Cotabato, also known as the Empire Province of Cotabato (Maguindanaon: Kutawatu, كوتوات), was a historical province of the Philippines established in 1914 that existed until its dissolution in 1973. The province's capital from 1920 to 1967 was Cotabato City (of the same name) while Pagalungan became its capital from 1967 to 1973.

Originally a district of the former Moro Province, on September 1, 1914, the defunct Department of Mindanao and Sulu provided with autonomous government through Act No. 2408 enacted on July 23, 1914, converted the district into a province along with other former Moro Province districts: Davao, Lanao, Sulu, Zamboanga, and its former sub-province Bukidnon. Davao, Lanao and Zamboanga were then later split and partitioned into different current provinces, Sulu was then later split and partitioned into the current provinces of Sulu and Tawi-Tawi, and Bukidnon mostly remain what it is today.

The province was one of the largest provinces of the Philippines, with an area of 2,296,791 hectares (22,967.91 km^{2}). It was dissolved on 1973, comprising what are now the provinces of Cotabato (North), South Cotabato, Maguindanao del Norte, Maguindanao del Sur, Sultan Kudarat, and Sarangani.

== History ==
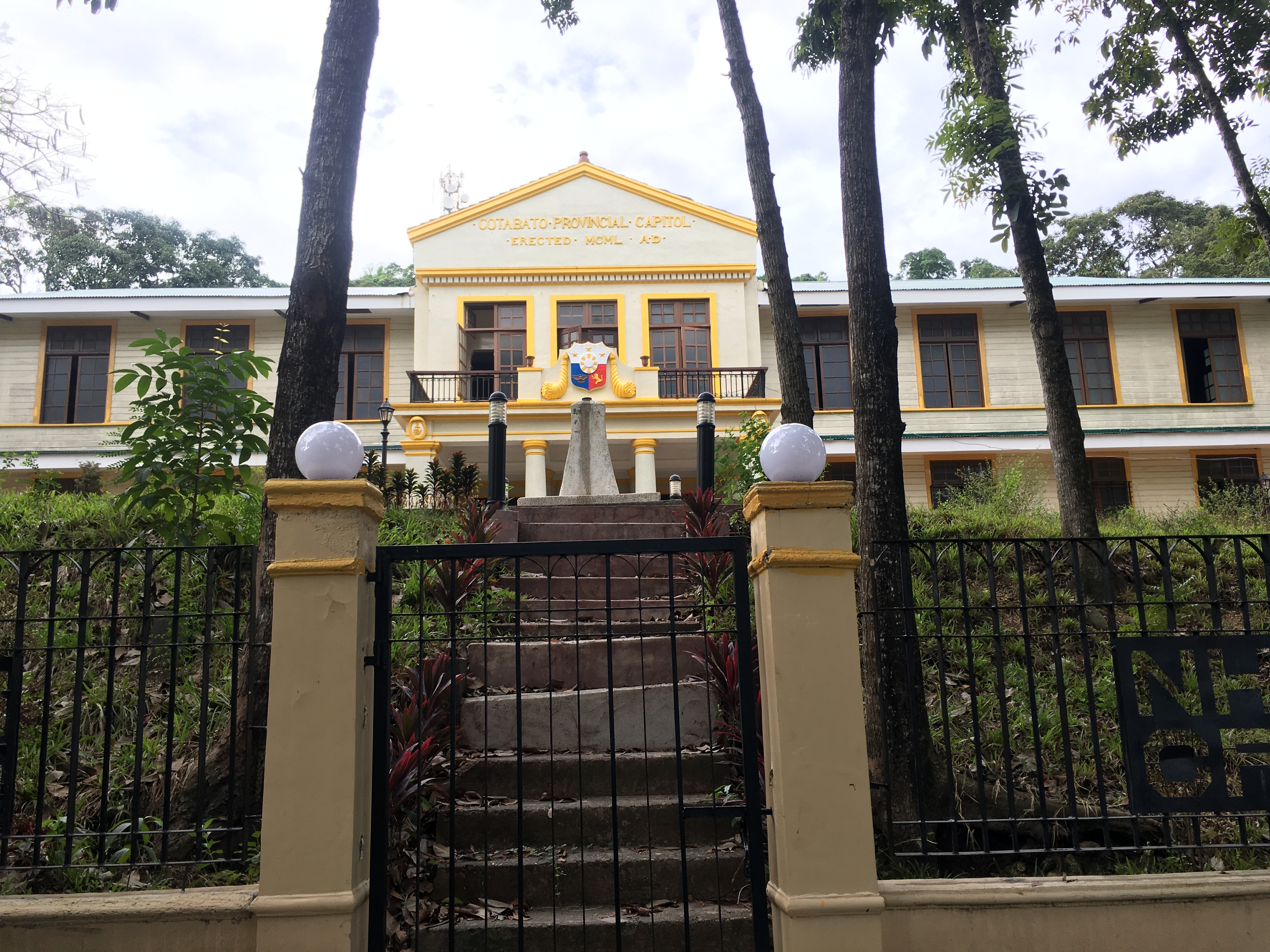
Old Cotabato Provincial Capitol, Located at PC Hill, Cotabato City

=== Establishment and composition ===
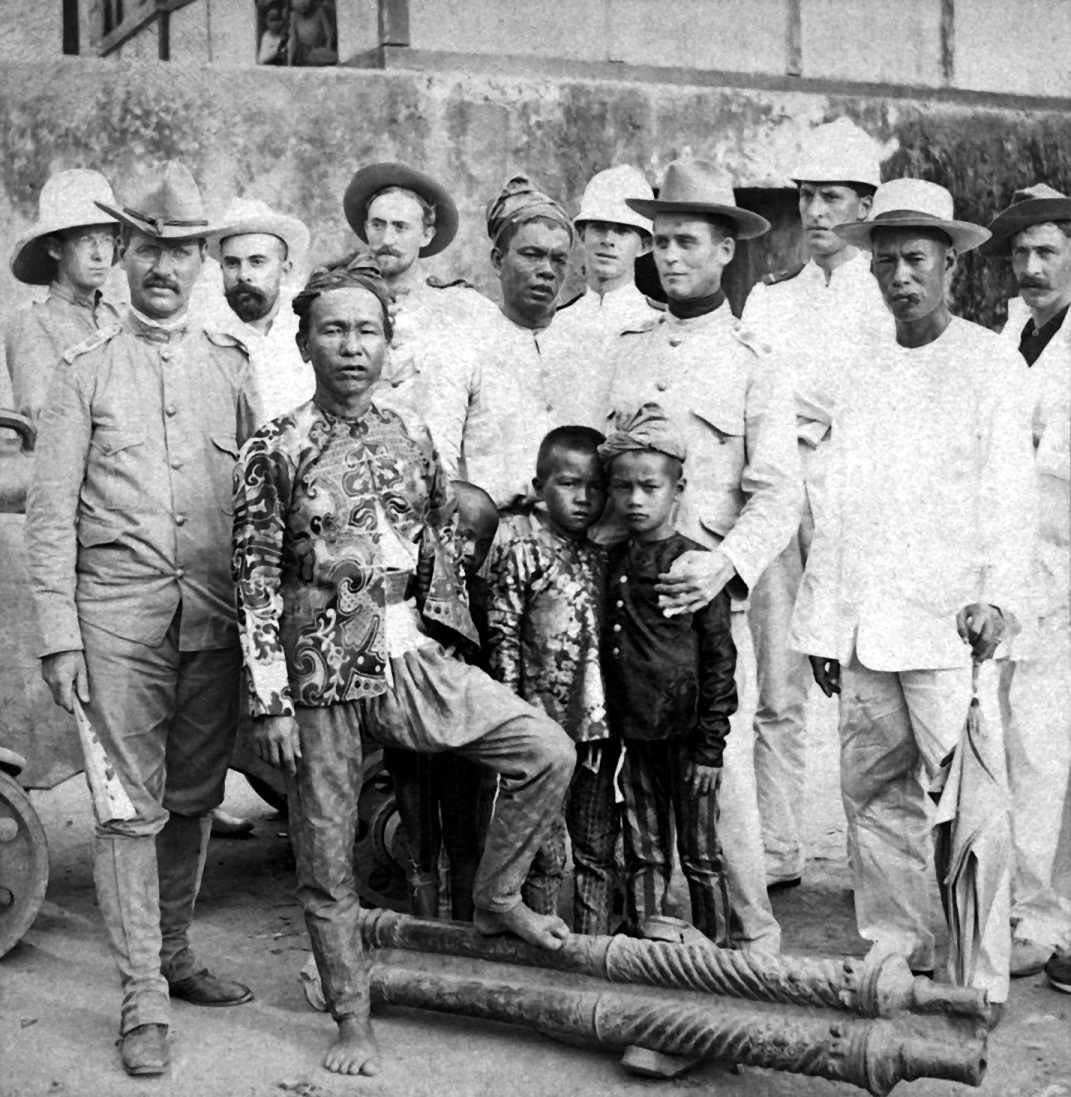
Datu Piang, fourth from the left, with American officers circa 1899.

Upon its separation from the Department of Mindanao and Sulu, Cotabato comprised the municipalities of Cotabato (the provincial capital), Dulawan, and Midsayap, and the following municipal districts:

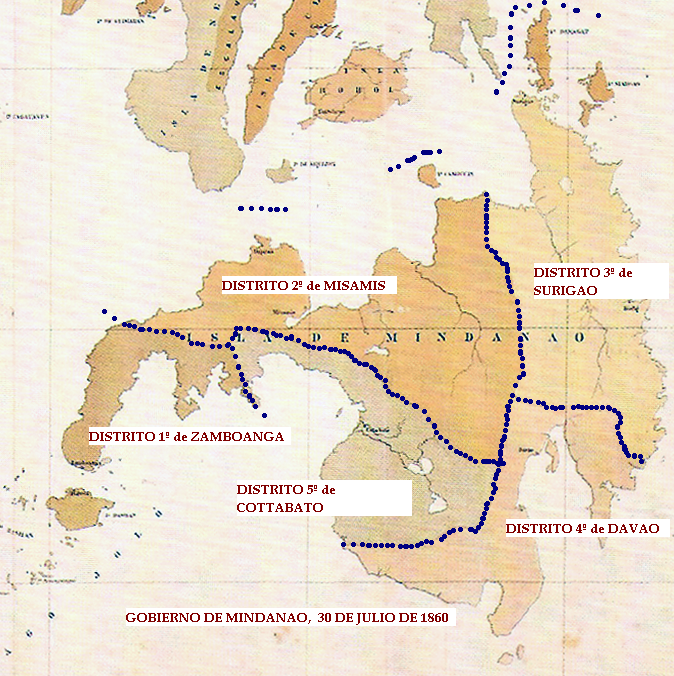
Gobierno de Mindanao: The 5 Districts created by Royal Decree of July 30, 1860.

- Awang
- Balatikan
- Balut
- Banisilan
- Barira
- Buayan
- Bugasan
- Buldun
- Buluan
- Carmen
- Daguma
- Dinaig
- Dulawan
- Gambar
- Glan
- Isulan
- Kabakan
- Kalanganan
- Kiamba
- Kidapawan
- Kitubud
- Kling
- Koronadal
- Lebak
- Libungan
- Liguasan
- Maganui
- Nuling
- Parang
- Pikit-Pagalungan
- Reina Regente
- Salaman
- Sebu
- Silik
- Subpangan
- Talayan
- Tumbau

On June 18, 1966, South Cotabato was separated from the province through Republic Act No. 4849. That very same day, the provincial capital was moved from Cotabato City to Pagalungan.

=== Dissolution ===
On November 22, 1973, the remaining territories of the Province of Cotabato was divided into North Cotabato, Maguindanao and Sultan Kudarat through Presidential Decree No. 341.

On March 7, 1984, North Cotabato was renamed to simply "Cotabato" through Batas Pambansa Blg. 660.

On March 16, 1992, the province of Sarangani was formed out of South Cotabato.

== See also ==
- Islam in the Philippines
