= Shariff Kabunsuan =

Former province of the Philippines

- Province of the Philippines
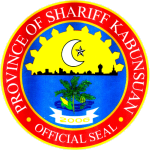
- Seal

- Location of the Short-lived Province of Shariff Kabunsuan.
- Capital: Datu Odin Sinsuat
- Area
  - Coordinates: 07°01′N 124°19′E
  - 2007: 4,028.57 km^{2} (1,555.44 sq mi)
- Population
  - 2007: 562,886
- Government
- Governor
  - June 30, 2007 – July 17, 2008: Datu Tucao O. Mastura (de facto)
  - Oct 8, 2007 – July 17, 2008: Ibrahim P. Ibay (acting)
- Officers-in-Charge
  - Nov 16, 2006 – May 14, 2007: Bimbo Q. Sinsuat
  - May 14, 2007 – October 8, 2007: Noraya S. Pasandalan
- History
  - Established: October 28, 2006
  - Disestablished: July 17, 2008
Preceded by	Succeeded by
Maguindanao	Maguindanao
- Today part of: Maguindanao del Norte

Shariff Kabunsuan was a short-lived province of the Philippines within the Autonomous Region in Muslim Mindanao (ARMM) that existed from 2006 to 2008. Its designated seat of government was Datu Odin Sinsuat. Initially comprising ten municipalities carved out of Maguindanao, Shariff Kabunsuan was created by virtue of Muslim Mindanao Autonomy Act No. 201; this law was nullified by the Supreme Court of the Philippines in 2008, thus disestablishing the province.

== History ==
Shariff Kabunsuan was established under Muslim Mindanao Autonomy Act No. 201 which provided for the creation of the new province comprising the nine municipalities of Barira, Buldon, Datu Odin Sinsuat, Kabuntalan, Matanog, Parang, Sultan Kudarat, Sultan Mastura, and Upi, all of the first legislative district of the mother province of Maguindanao. A tenth municipality, Datu Blah T. Sinsuat, was created within the proposed province on July 15, 2006, weeks prior to the actual plebiscite for the creation of the province.

The plebiscite for the creation of the province was held on October 28, 2006. Muslim Mindanao Autonomy Act No. 201 was ratified by the affirmative majority (285,372) votes cast in a plebiscite, thus establishing the province. Only 8,802 voted for its rejection.

The law establishing Shariff Kabunsuan was enacted by the Regional Assembly for the Autonomous Region in Muslim Mindanao, the first such province established by that local body, which had been so empowered under Republic Act No. 9054 or the Expanded ARMM law. Shariff Kabunsuan was the first province since Philippine independence that was not established through an Act of Congress.

At the time of its creation, Shariff Kabunsuan was the Philippines' 80th province and the sixth in the Autonomous Region in Muslim Mindanao. The province was named after Shariff Mohammed Kabungsuwan, an Arab-Malay Islamic preacher who introduced Islam to central Mindanao in the 16th century.

An eleventh municipality was established two months after: the creation of Northern Kabuntalan by virtue of Muslim Mindanao Autonomy Act No. 205 was affirmed in a plebiscite held on December 30, 2006.

Datu Odin Sinsuat was designated the capital of the new province, per Section 1 of MMA Act 201. Cotabato City, which is an independent city that does not vote for provincial officials, belongs to neither Maguindanao nor Shariff Kabunsuan. However, for the purposes of congressional representation the said city was grouped with Shariff Kabunsuan, as per Section 5 of MMA Act No. 201. This specific provision became the subject of the Supreme Court case that led to the disestablishment of the province.

=== Supreme Court case ===
On July 17, 2008, the Supreme Court, in Sema v. Comelec declared the creation of the province of Shariff Kabunsuan void and ruled that the power of ARMM's legislature to create provinces and cities is unconstitutional. The Supreme Court in particular held that only the Congress of the Philippines was empowered to create provinces and cities because the creation of such necessarily included the power to create legislative districts, which explicitly under the Philippine Constitution was within the sole prerogative of Congress to establish. Consequently, the Court also declared the power of the Regional Assembly to create provinces and cities within the Autonomous Region in Muslim Mindanao as unconstitutional.

Despite a motion for reconsideration filed by ARMM officials, the Supreme Court reaffirmed its ruling in January 2009, thereby rendering its decision as final.

The province would eventually be recreated in almost identical borders and with the same capital under the name Maguindanao del Norte, this time being created by Congress instead of a regional assembly and including Talitay (Sultan Sumagka).

== Administrative divisions ==
Shariff Kabunsuan was composed of 11 municipalities distributed between two Sangguniang Panlalawigan districts:

Historical municipalities of Shariff Kabunsuan
Municipality	District	No. of barangays
Barira	1st	14
Buldon	1st	15
Datu Blah T. Sinsuat	2nd	12
Datu Odin Sinsuat (Dinaig) †	2nd	34
Kabuntalan (Tumbao)	2nd	17
Matanog	1st	8
Northern Kabuntalan	2nd	11
Parang	1st	24
Sultan Kudarat (Nuling)	1st	39
Sultan Mastura	1st	13
Upi	2nd	23
† Provincial capital
Italicized names are former names.

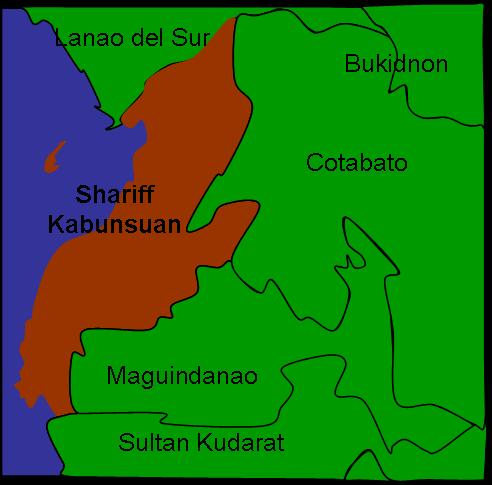

== See also ==
- Sema v. COMELEC and Dilangalen
- Maguindanao del Norte creation plebiscite
