= Sultan Kudarat, Maguindanao del Norte =

Municipality in Maguindanao del Norte, Philippines

Sultan Kudarat سلطان قدرات Nuling
- Municipality
- Municipality of Sultan Kudarat
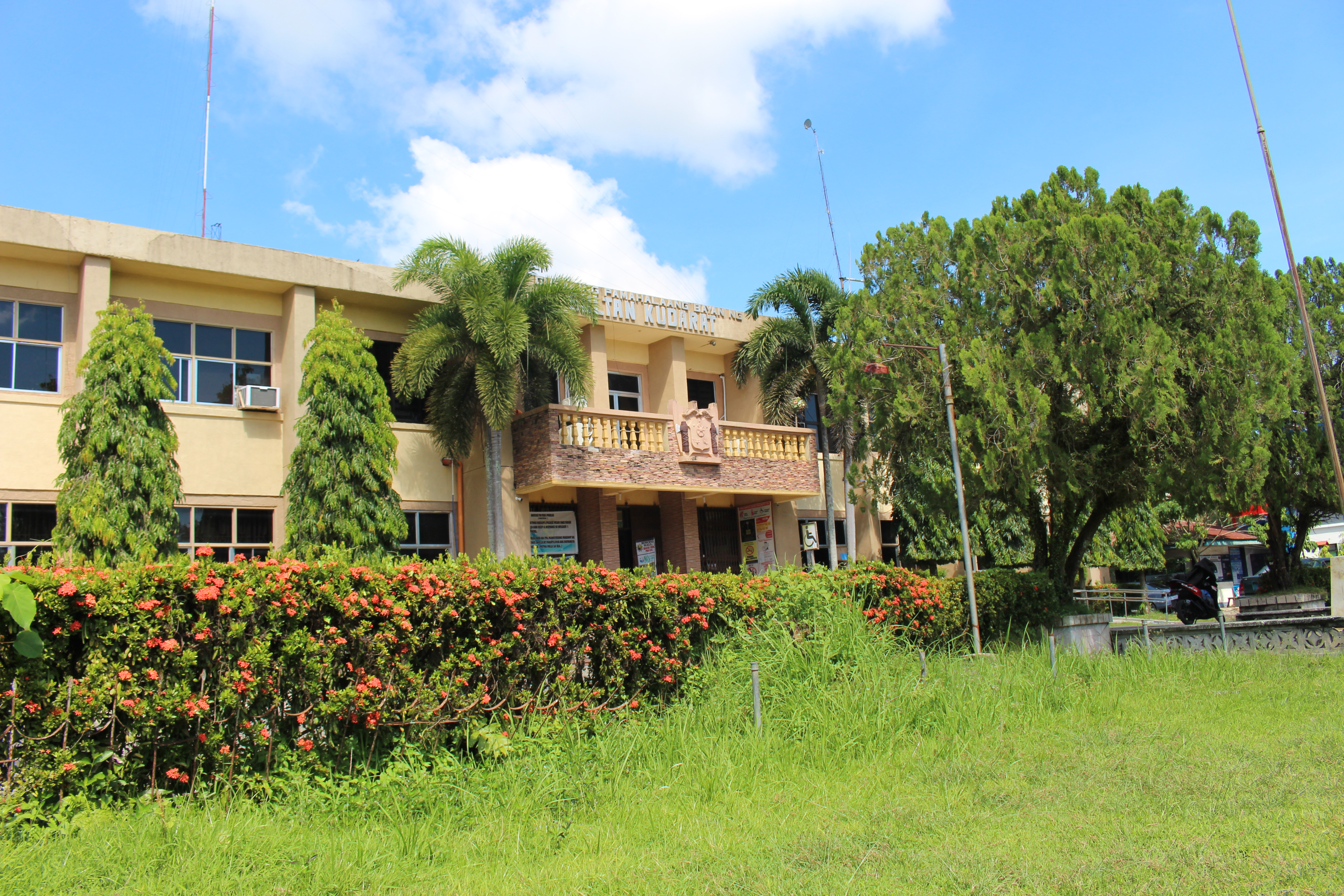
- Municipal Hall at Brgy. Dalumangcob

- Seal

- Map of Maguindanao del Norte with Sultan Kudarat highlighted
- Interactive map of Sultan Kudarat
- Location within the Philippines
- Coordinates: 7°14′N 124°15′E
- Country: Philippines
- Region: Bangsamoro Autonomous Region in Muslim Mindanao
- Province: Maguindanao del Norte
- House district: Lone district
- Parliamentary district: 3rd, 5th district
- Named for: Sultan Muhammad Dipatuan Kudarat
- Barangays: 39 (see Barangays)

Government
  - Type: Sangguniang Bayan
  - Mayor: Shameem B. Mastura
  - House Representative: Norhaina Mastura-Maik
  - Municipal Council: Members: Saman L. Abdul; Abas D. Ahmad; Brahim K. Ali; Omar K. Bakar; Norhana M. Maik; Mohammed A. Casim; Nasser A. Ali; Nor-ain M. Kunakon
  - Electorate: 63,504 voters (2025)

Area
  - Total: 712.91 km^{2} (275.26 sq mi)
- Elevation: 34 m (112 ft)
- Highest elevation: 160 m (520 ft)
- Lowest elevation: 5 m (16 ft)

Population (2024 census)
  - Total: 124,965
  - Density: 175.29/km^{2} (454.00/sq mi)
  - Households: 17,437

Economy
  - Income class: 1st municipal income class
  - Poverty incidence: 44.17% (2023)
  - Revenue: ₱ 435.3 million (2024)
  - Assets: ₱ 606.3 million (2024)
  - Expenditure: ₱ 402.8 million (2024)
  - Liabilities: ₱ 65.14 million (2024)

Service provider
  - Electricity: Maguindanao Electric Cooperative (MAGELCO)
- Time zone: UTC+8 (PST)
- ZIP code: 9605
- PSGC: 1903812000
- IDD : area code: +63 (0)64
- Native languages: Maguindanao; Iranun; Tagalog
- Website: www.sultankudarat-mag.gov.ph

Sultan Kudarat, officially the Municipality of Sultan Kudarat, (Note: Maguindanaon: Inged nu Sultan Kudarat; Iranun: Inged a Sultan Kudarat; Tagalog: Bayan ng Sultan Kudarat) is a municipality and seat of government of the province of Maguindanao del Norte, Philippines. According to the 2024 census, it had a population of 124,965.

Formerly known as Nuling, Sultan Kudarat became the capital of Maguindanao in 1977. From 2011 to 2022, it served as the province's legislative capital by housing the Maguindanao Provincial Board, while executive operations were based in Buluan. Following the division of the province under Republic Act 11550 in 2022, Datu Odin Sinsuat was designated the official capital of Maguindanao del Norte, though Sultan Kudarat remains its interim seat of government pending the construction of a new provincial capitol.

== History ==
The original seat of the Sultanate of Maguindanao was located at the mouth of the Maguindanao river (now Matampay) but later transferred to the nearby sitio at the bank of the Nuling Creek of Barangay Salimbao of this Municipality.

Sultan Mastura Kudarat, a royal lineage of the hero soldier Sultan Dipatuan Kudaratullah was appointed by American Governor Carpenter as President of the Municipal District of Nuling. The former declined and instead designated his son, Datu Mamadra Mastura for the position, who served from 1922 to 1923.

Nuling was a municipal district already prior to its reorganization as one of the twenty-eight, in the then-undivided Cotabato province, through Executive Order No. 9 issued by Department of Mindanao and Sulu acting governor Ponciano Reyes on March 8, 1917. It had six barrios then.

By virtue of Executive Order (EO) No. 82, issued by President Manuel Roxas on August 18, 1947, which organized the remaining municipal districts of the province into ten new municipalities, Nuling, Gubpañgan, and Balut, became part of the town bearing the name of the former, which would be its seat of government.

The boundary line with Parang was fixed twice through executive orders by President Elpidio Quirino, in 1949 and in 1953.

During the presidency of Carlos P. Garcia, the seat of municipal government was moved to Barrio Dalumangcob in 1957 through EO No. 267. Republic Act (RA) No. 3357, which became effective a year after its issuance in 1961, provided the conversion of ten sitios into barrios.

The municipality was renamed Sultan Kudarat through RA No. 5647, issued on June 21, 1969, in honor of Sultan of Maguindanao, Mohammad Dipatuan Kudarat.

In a plebiscite conducted on March 15, 2003, the electorate of the Municipality unanimously voted in favor of the creation of a new Municipality in the name of Sultan Mastura, being a son of Sultan Kudarat. The new Municipality of Sultan Mastura absorbed 13 barangays from the former leaving 39 for its mother town.

The town was part of the province of Shariff Kabunsuan from October 2006 until its nullification by the Supreme Court in July 2008.

On January 23, 2021, a joint police-military operation occurred, with twelve members of the Talusan group including a former village chief, as well as a Special Action Force member, killed in a shootout. The armed group was the "most wanted" in the municipality.

A plebiscite was scheduled to be held on September 7, 2024 to approve the creation of the municipality of Nuling from parts of Sultan Kudarat. However, the vote was shelved after the Supreme Court ruled on August 20 that provisions of the enabling act passed by the Bangsamoro government for the plebiscite were unconstitutional, particularly allowing only voters from barangays of the would-be municipality to participate in the exercise.

=== As the capital of Maguindanao ===
On July 11, 1977, Presidential Decree (PD) 1170, amending PD 341 that creating Maguindanao out of the divided Cotabato in 1973, moved the provincial seat from (now Shariff Aguak) to Sultan Kudarat, citing that the town "has more facilities to offer". Datu Sanggacala Baraguir, who served as the third provincial governor since that year, had a new provincial capitol built there, which was his hometown—at the present-day Simuay, situated near Camp Darapanan, the main camp of the Moro Islamic Liberation Front. His successor returned the provincial government's office to the original site; yet the designation remained until 2001 under the governorship of Andal Ampatuan Sr. of Shariff Aguak, citing security concerns.

Later, the provincial board temporarily held office at the Association of Barangay Captains (ABC) building in the municipal compound. On May 3, 2011, Resolution 078 was passed establishing Simuay as their official site; and on April 3, 2012, Resolution 132 provided the reiteration of Sultan Kudarat as the official provincial seat. Meanwhile, vice governor Ismael Mastura temporarily held office in his hometown—in the ABC building, also due to security reasons.

After the rehabilitation of the old Capitol in Simuay, on June 14, 2012, a rehabilitated structure was inaugurated as the new site of the provincial legislature. Such designation as the provincial legislative capital remained until the division of Maguindanao in 2022 by the virtue of RA No. 11550, which stated that the seat of Maguindanao del Norte, which now constitutes Sultan Kudarat, would be in Datu Odin Sinsuat.

Abdulraof Macacua, at the beginning of his term as OIC governor in April 2023, announced that his leadership seeks to establish the seat in Simuay.

== Geography ==
=== Barangays ===
Sultan Kudarat is politically subdivided into 39 barangays. Each barangay consists of puroks while some have sitios.

- Alamada
- Banatin
- Banubo
- Bulalo
- Bulibod
- Calsada
- Crossing Simuay
- Dalumangcob (Poblacion)
- Damaniog
- Darapanan
- Gang
- Inawan
- Kabuntalan
- Kakar
- Kapimpilan
- Katamlangan (Matampay)
- Katidtuan
- Katuli
- Ladia
- Limbo
- Maidapa
- Makaguiling
- Matengen
- Mulaug
- Nalinan
- Nara(Sultan Kudarat Mopakc)
- Nekitan
- Olas
- Panatan
- Pigcalagan
- Pigkelegan (Ibotegen)
- Pinaring
- Pingping
- Raguisi
- Rebuken
- Salimbao
- Sambolawan
- Senditan
- Ungap

=== Climate ===
Climate data for Sultan Kudarat, Maguindanao del Norte
Month	Jan	Feb	Mar	Apr	May	Jun	Jul	Aug	Sep	Oct	Nov	Dec	Year
Mean daily maximum °C (°F)	28 (82)	28 (82)	29 (84)	29 (84)	27 (81)	26 (79)	26 (79)	26 (79)	27 (81)	26 (79)	27 (81)	27 (81)	27 (81)
Mean daily minimum °C (°F)	19 (66)	19 (66)	19 (66)	20 (68)	21 (70)	20 (68)	20 (68)	20 (68)	20 (68)	20 (68)	20 (68)	19 (66)	20 (68)
Average precipitation mm (inches)	53 (2.1)	44 (1.7)	41 (1.6)	39 (1.5)	69 (2.7)	89 (3.5)	92 (3.6)	97 (3.8)	72 (2.8)	79 (3.1)	72 (2.8)	49 (1.9)	796 (31.1)
Average rainy days	15.3	13.5	16.3	16.9	22.3	23.5	22.5	23.1	19.4	21.5	20.6	17.5	232.4
Source: Meteoblue (modeled/calculated data, not measured locally)

== Demographics ==
Population census of Sultan Kudarat
Year	Pop.	±% p.a.
1918	6,603	—
1939	15,823	+4.25%
1948	15,127	−0.50%
1960	30,614	+6.05%
1970	40,377	+2.80%
1975	47,101	+3.14%
1980	48,383	+0.54%
1990	72,331	+4.10%
1995	76,125	+0.96%
2000	94,861	+4.83%
2007	121,324	+3.45%
2010	82,758	−13.00%
2015	95,201	+2.70%
2020	105,121	+2.11%
2024	124,965	+4.24%
Source: Philippine Statistics Authority

== Economy ==
Poverty Incidence of Sultan Kudarat

Source: Philippine Statistics Authority

The LGU had a poverty incidence of 35.1% or there are about 57,147 of the 181,419 population who are living below the ARMM's poverty threshold of 75,000 or an annual per capita income of P10,714 for the family size of 7. This poverty incidence is 1.4% lower than the National average of 32.9%.

Though Sultan Kudarat hosts seventy percent of the agro-industries of the Province of Shariff Kabunsuan, its main economy is derived from the agriculture sector.

The municipality of Sultan Kudarat hosts Lamsan, one of the largest corn products manufacturers in the Philippines. The company provides employment to hundreds of workers in the municipality and nearby towns of Maguindanao del Norte.

The Gross Domestic Product of the Municipality (2022) is 23,646,300,000(PHP).

=== Farming ===
The municipality has 23,152.263 hectares of agricultural lands. While based on the year 2005 MAO's report, only 10,035 hectares of which or forty percent (49%) have been productively used, reflecting a yield of 121.4, 13,282 and 7,820 metric tons for copra, rice and corn respectively, earning a gross income of P169,279,300.00 for the year 2005. Its High Value Commercial crops have so far covered 273 hectares and shared a total yield of 536 metric tons that earned P9, 357,000.00.

YEAR 2010 CROP PRODUCTION

- CROPS PLANTED AREA PLANTED IN HA.

Ave. / Yield, crop, ha (in Metric Tons) / Remarks

1. Rice / 12,000 / 3.5 / Mostly upland rice
2. Corn / 10,000 / 2.5
3. Coconut intercropped with corn and other crops / 12,000 / 2 (for coconut) 2,5 (for other crops)
4. Mango / 2,000 / 3
5. Banana / 5,000 / 5

TOTAL: 41,000 18.2

=== Fishing ===
The town possesses vast fishing grounds, the Maguindanao and Matampay Rivers, Illana Bay, lakes and its 1,393.4 hectares fishpond have been the major source of fish that supplies the fish requirements of the municipality and its neighboring towns. However, development programs have to be introduced to fully develop its potentials. The fish production reported is only 167,300 kilograms for the year 2005 which is not enough to supply the municipality's fish requirement of 3.9 million kilograms.

=== Livestock and poultry ===
In 2005, the Municipality of Sultan Kudarat has a total livestock population of 10,997 heads. The livestock species that are popularly raised in the municipality are carabao, cattle, and goat, probably because the town is thickly populated by the Islam believers. Its poultry population have totaled to 24,693 heads. The present livestock and poultry production of the municipality is not sufficient to supply the meat requirements of the municipality for it can only provide a total of 234,691 kilograms for the year 2005 which is very far behind the town's food requirements of about 3.7 million kilograms.

Livestock Production:

Livestock / Number of Heads / Percent to Total

1. Carabao / 3,120 / 17.4
2. Cattle / 4,387 / 24.4
3. Goat / 8,775 / 48.9
4. Swine / 960 / 5.3
5. Sheep / 136 / .75
6. Horse / 53 / .29
7. Others / 500 / 2.7

T O T A L: 17,931 100%

Poultry Production:

Livestock / Number of Heads / Percent (%) to Total

1. Chicken / 31,287 / 36.1
2. Ducks / 38,732 / 44.7
3. Turkeys / 6,751 / 7.79
4. Geese / 9,873 / 11.39

T O T A L: 86,643 100.00%

Source: DAF-ARMM, Sultan Kudarat, Maguindanao

== Social services ==
=== Education and literacy ===
About 79.2 percent of the municipality's school age population are literate, that is able to read and write, based on the 1995 census. The data likewise shows that 43% are in elementary level and 26% are in high school level. College undergraduate shared with 5.4%, and 2.4% are college graduate.

=== Health ===
There is one government hospital in the town, the Cotabato Sanitarium, but it caters only to specific health needs. There are about 26 Barangay Health Centers and 10 health personnel, composed of 1 medical doctor, 1 dental doctor, 6 midwives, 1 nurse and 1 sanitary inspector, serving the 39 barangays of the municipality. The health personnel are being augmented by 8 health workers and 39 trained hilots.

== See also ==
- List of renamed cities and municipalities of the Philippines
