= Upi, Maguindanao del Norte =

Municipality in Maguindanao del Norte, Philippines

Upi اوڤ
- Municipality
- Municipality of Upi
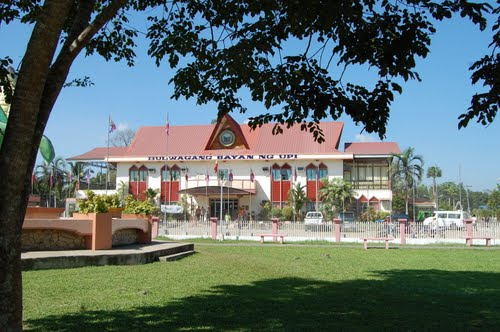
- Municipal Hall of Upi

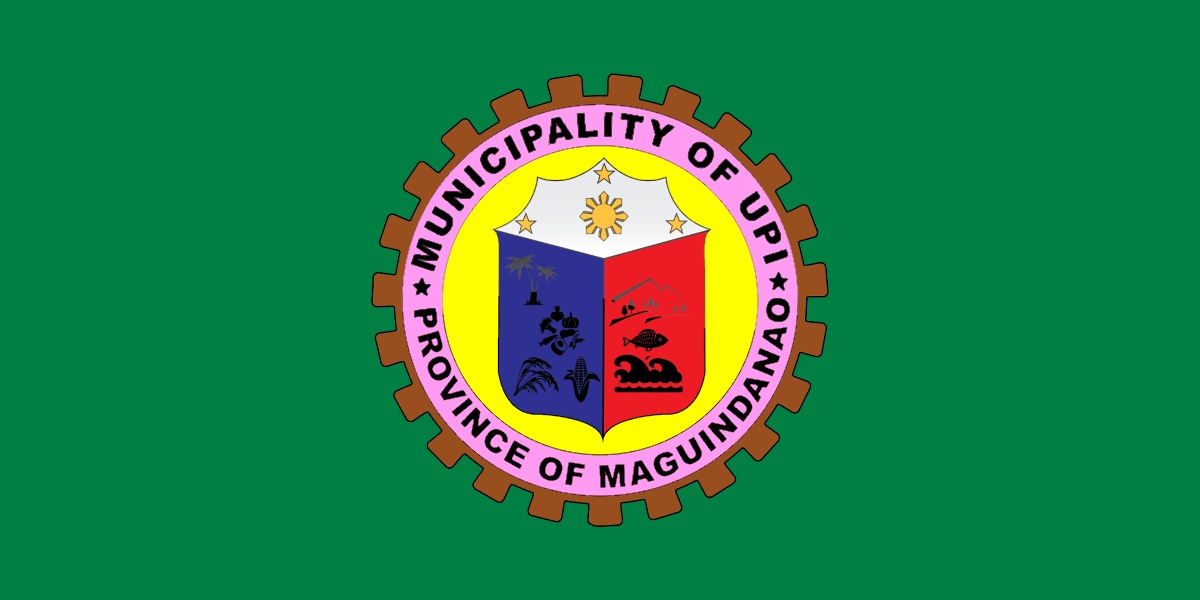
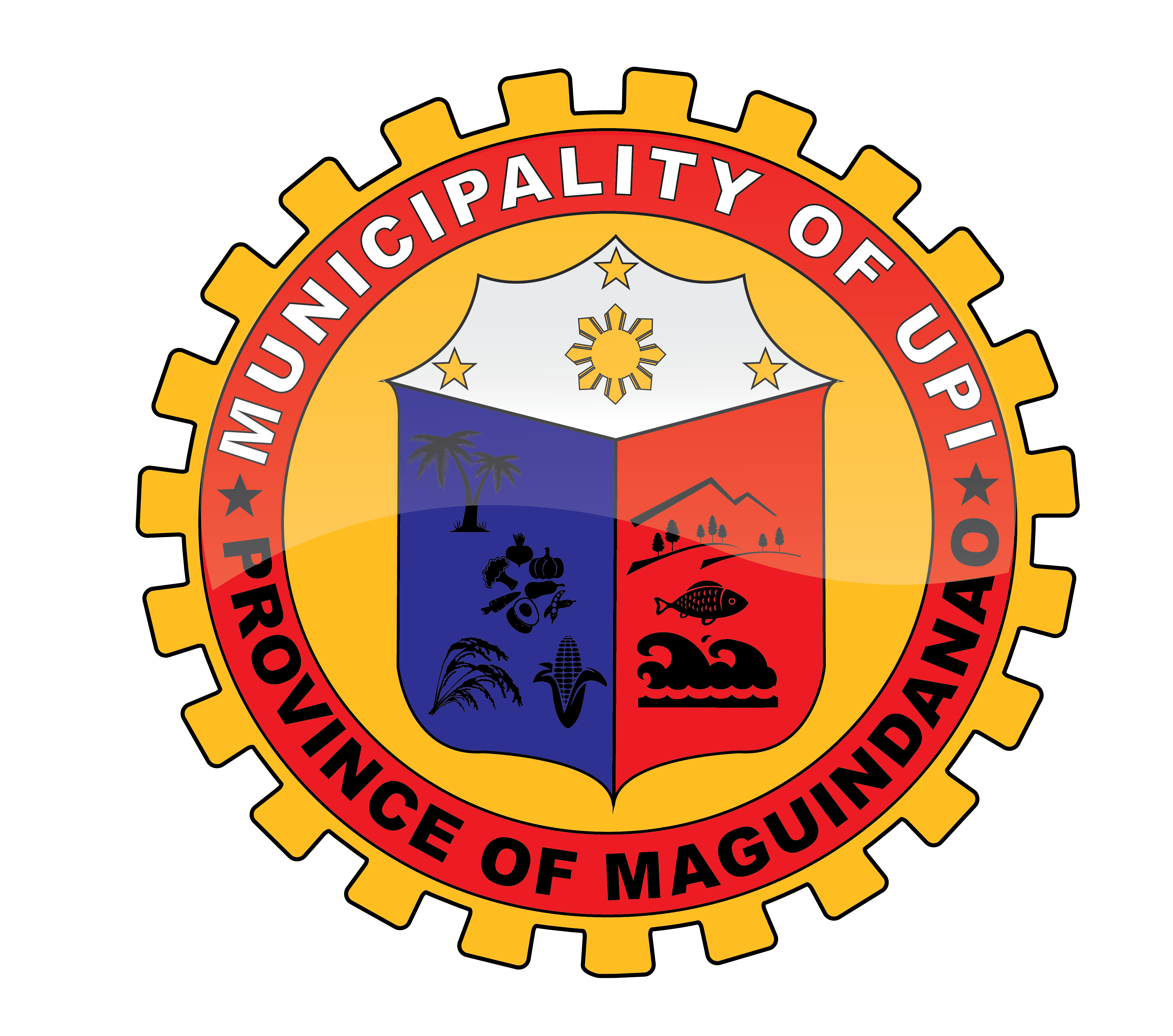
- Flag Seal

- Map of Maguindanao del Norte with Upi highlighted
- Interactive map of Upi
- Location within the Philippines
- Coordinates: 7°00′38″N 124°09′47″E
- Country: Philippines
- Region: Bangsamoro Autonomous Region in Muslim Mindanao
- Province: Maguindanao del Norte
- House district: Lone district
- Parliamentary district: 4th district
- Founded: June 10, 1955
- Barangays: 23 (see Barangays)

Government
  - Type: Sangguniang Bayan
  - Mayor: Ma. Rona Cristina P. Flores
  - Vice Mayor: Wilfredo T. Ibañez
  - House Representative: Sittie Shahara "Dimple" I. Mastura (PDPLBN)
  - Municipal Council: Members: Ariel M. Layson; Datu Jamshid Mashruk A. Sinsuat; Neil Christopher C. Platon; Saidie O. Lidasan; Geraldine G. Bacas; Alex A. Peñaloza; Nestor R. Tiban; Maria Elena T. Castro II
  - Electorate: 47,060 voters (2025)

Area
  - Total: 742.95 km^{2} (286.85 sq mi)
- Elevation: 537 m (1,762 ft)
- Highest elevation: 1,002 m (3,287 ft)
- Lowest elevation: 367 m (1,204 ft)

Population (2024 census)
  - Total: 65,363
  - Density: 87.978/km^{2} (227.86/sq mi)
  - Households: 11,596

Economy
  - Income class: 1st municipal income class
  - Poverty incidence: 43.92% (2023)
  - Revenue: ₱ 432 million (2022)
  - Assets: ₱ 546.7 million (2022)
  - Expenditure: ₱ 397.4 million (2022)
  - Liabilities: ₱ 53.06 million (2022)

Service provider
  - Electricity: Maguindanao Electric Cooperative (MAGELCO)
- Time zone: UTC+8 (PST)
- ZIP code: 9602
- PSGC: 1903815000
- IDD : area code: +63 (0)64
- Native languages: Maguindanao; Teduray; Tagalog
- Website: www.upi.gov.ph

Upi, officially the Municipality of Upi (Maguindanaon: Inged nu Upi; Jawi: ايڠد نو اوڤ Teduray: Inged Ufi; Tagalog: Bayan ng Upi) and commonly known by its proposed name North Upi, is a municipality in the province of Maguindanao del Norte, Philippines. According to the 2024 census, it had a population of 65,363.

The municipality was part of the province of Shariff Kabunsuan from October 2006 until its nullification by the Supreme Court in July 2008.

== Etymology ==
The name Upi probably derives from the term ufi. Ufi is a Teduray name for a certain tree (piper betel) that grew abundantly in the place in the early years. The bark of the ufi is used with betel nuts for chewing or mama in Teduray. The Teduray are the native inhabitants of present-day Upi.

== History ==
The beginning of Upi as a district geographical and political entity largely began from the early part of 1901 to 1910, when American forces set foot in the then Province of Cotabato.

An American Army Officer, Captain Irving Bryant Edwards, was assigned in Awang. Edwards showed great interest in bringing the government closer to the people by establishing schools in the far-flung areas. He reached the fertile valley of Upi and founded the Upi Agricultural School on August 19, 1919. From a USAFFE soldier, Capt. Irving Bryant Edwards turned educator.

Upi was formerly a barrio of Dinaig. It was separated from Dinaig by virtue of Republic Act No. 1248, which was approved on June 10, 1955. On December 16 of the same year, President Elpidio Quirino signed Executive Order No. 142, creating 42 barrios of Upi.

The first municipal mayor, vice mayor and councilors of Upi were appointed by the president of the Philippines. Maria Badoy was appointed as the first municipal mayor. In 1956, residents of the town were encouraged to participate in the political affairs of the local government, and there took place the first election wherein Mayor Ignacio Tenorio Labina, a Teduray leader, was the first elected mayor of Upi and held his office for four years.

The town was the site of the Battle of Upi in 1974 where Moro National Liberation Front rebels clashed with Philippine Army special forces in Nuro Elementary School in the town center during the Moro conflict.

In 2006, Upi lost about 147 square kilometres (57 sq mi) when the coastal barangays Kinimi, Laguitan, Lapaken, Matuber, Meti, Nalkan, Penansaran, Sedem, Sinipak, Resa, Tambak and Tubuan were separated from the municipality to create the new municipality of Datu Blah T. Sinsuat.

== Geography ==
Upi is a mountainous town situated in the south-western coastal portion of Maguindanao del Norte.

=== Barangays ===
Upi is politically subdivided into 23 barangays. Each barangay consists of puroks while some have sitios.

- Bantek
- Bayabas
- Blensong
- Borongotan
- Bugabungan
- Bungcog
- Darugao
- Ganasi
- Kabakaba
- Kibleg
- Kibucay
- Kiga
- Kinitaan
- Mirab
- Nangi
- Nuro (Poblacion)
- Ranao Pilayan
- Rempes
- Renede
- Renti
- Rifao
- Sefegefen
- Tinungkaan

=== Climate ===
Climate data for Upi, Maguindanao del Norte
Month	Jan	Feb	Mar	Apr	May	Jun	Jul	Aug	Sep	Oct	Nov	Dec	Year
Mean daily maximum °C (°F)	29 (84)	29 (84)	29 (84)	29 (84)	28 (82)	27 (81)	26 (79)	27 (81)	27 (81)	27 (81)	27 (81)	28 (82)	28 (82)
Mean daily minimum °C (°F)	18 (64)	19 (66)	19 (66)	20 (68)	21 (70)	21 (70)	20 (68)	20 (68)	20 (68)	20 (68)	20 (68)	19 (66)	20 (68)
Average precipitation mm (inches)	30 (1.2)	19 (0.7)	25 (1.0)	24 (0.9)	64 (2.5)	88 (3.5)	102 (4.0)	105 (4.1)	76 (3.0)	82 (3.2)	60 (2.4)	26 (1.0)	701 (27.5)
Average rainy days	9.8	8.5	11.3	11.9	21.6	23.9	24.1	24.5	20.9	21.8	16.8	11.8	206.9
Source: Meteoblue (modeled/calculated data, not measured locally)

== Demographics ==
Population census of Upi
Year	Pop.	±% p.a.
1960	27,616	—
1970	35,727	+2.61%
1975	39,010	+1.78%
1980	31,010	−4.48%
1990	45,957	+4.01%
1995	46,440	+0.20%
2000	51,141	+2.09%
2007	41,757	−2.76%
2010	45,444	+3.13%
2015	53,583	+3.19%
2020	59,004	+2.05%
2024	65,363	+2.49%
Source: Philippine Statistics Authority

== Economy ==
Poverty Incidence of Upi

Source: Philippine Statistics Authority

Gross Domestic Product

The Gross Domestic Product of the Municipality (2022) is 22,238,700,000(PHP).

== Government ==
The current mayor of Upi is Ma. Rona Cristina A. Piang-Flores, who was elected in 2022 during the National and Local Elections.

List of former mayors:

- Maria Badoy - 1955 to 1956 - Appointed Mayor
- Ignacio Tenorio Labina - 1956 to 1960 - First Elected Mayor
- Datu Abdullah "Ugcog" Sinsuat - 1960 to 1963 - Elected Mayor
- Datu Michael "Puti" P. Sinsuat - 1963 to 1980 - Elected Mayor
- Bai Fatima P. Sinsuat - 1980 to 1986 - Elected Mayor
- Datu Mohammad "Unting" Sinsuat - 1986 to 1987 - Appointed Mayor
- Datu Mohammad "Unting" Sinsuat - 1987 to 1992 - Elected Mayor
- Datu Michael "Puti" P. Sinsuat - 1992 to 2001 - Elected Mayor
- Ramon A. Piang, Sr. - 2001 to 2010 - Elected Mayor
- Ruben D. Platon - 2010 to 2011 - Elected Mayor
- Ramon A. Piang, Sr - 2011 to 2022 - Elected Mayor

== Culture ==
=== Meguyaya festival ===
Meguyaya, a Teduray term for thanksgiving for the bountiful harvest, is an annual festival celebrated every December. The festivities incorporate street dancing competition depicting the tri-people culture of the Teduray, Maguindanaon and Settlers. Other activities include the Cultural Nights, Local Government Unit Night, Ginoong Meguyaya male pageant, trade fair and Maisan Na. This is an activity in which a long stretch of grillers are placed by the roadside where everyone enjoys roasting corns, a symbol of togetherness and feasting.
