= Buldon =

Municipality in Maguindanao del Norte, Philippines

Buldon بولدون
- Municipality
- Municipality of Buldon
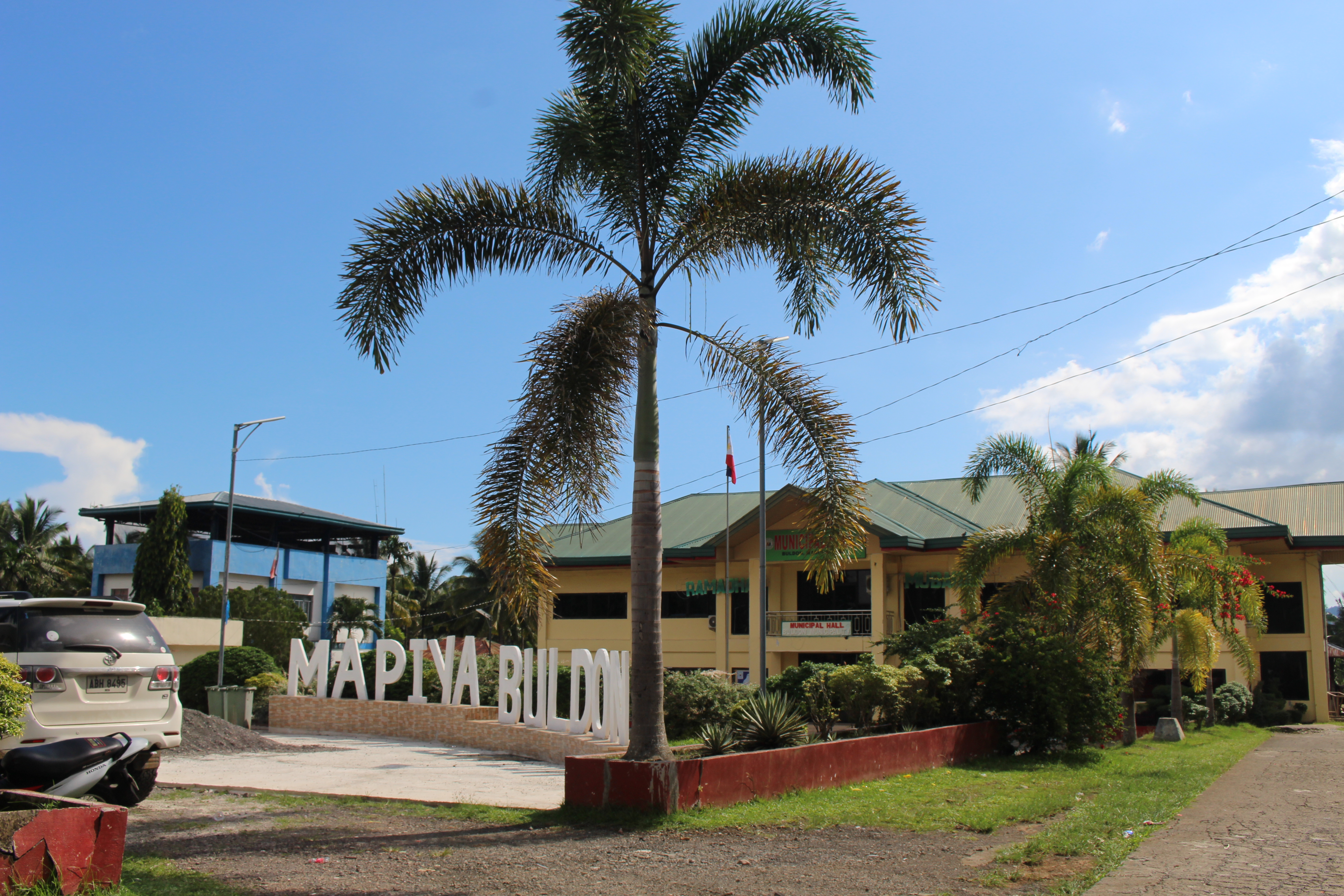
- Municipal Hall

- Seal

- Map of Maguindanao del Norte with Buldon highlighted
- Interactive map of Buldon
- Location within the Philippines
- Coordinates: 7°31′N 124°22′E
- Country: Philippines
- Region: Bangsamoro Autonomous Region in Muslim Mindanao
- Province: Maguindanao del Norte
- House district: Lone district
- Parliamentary district: 1st district
- Barangays: 15 (see Barangays)

Government
  - Type: Sangguniang Bayan
  - Mayor: Pahmia A. Manalao
  - Vice Mayor: Abolais A. Manalao
  - House Representative: Sittie Shahara "Dimple" I. Mastura
  - Municipal Council: Members: Cairoden P. Pangunotan; Anwar M. Abdullah; Esmail L. Diron; Manua B. Tomawis; McArthur M. Manalao; Monisa M. Saranga; Kusain D. Ali; Zuraida A. Mangoramas
  - Electorate: 23,025 voters (2025)

Area
  - Total: 392.61 km^{2} (151.59 sq mi)
- Elevation: 408 m (1,339 ft)
- Highest elevation: 809 m (2,654 ft)
- Lowest elevation: 198 m (650 ft)

Population (2024 census)
  - Total: 45,676
  - Density: 116.34/km^{2} (301.32/sq mi)
  - Households: 6,309

Economy
  - Income class: 1st municipal income class
  - Poverty incidence: 40.01% (2023)
  - Revenue: ₱ 249.8 million (2024)
  - Assets: ₱ 289 million (2024)
  - Expenditure: ₱ 245.7 million (2024)
  - Liabilities: ₱ 37.31 million (2024)

Service provider
  - Electricity: Maguindanao Electric Cooperative (MAGELCO)
- Time zone: UTC+8 (PST)
- ZIP code: 9615
- PSGC: 1903802000
- IDD : area code: +63 (0)64
- Native languages: Maguindanao; Maranao; Tagalog
- Website: www.buldon.gov.ph

Buldon, officially the Municipality of Buldon (Maguindanaon: Inged nu Buldun; Iranun and Mëranaw: Inged a Buldon; Tagalog: Bayan ng Buldon), is a municipality in the province of Maguindanao del Norte, Philippines.

The town was part of the province of Shariff Kabunsuan from October 2006 until its nullification by the Supreme Court in July 2008.

== History ==
=== Establishment and territorial changes ===
Buldon was established through Republic Act No. 3419, approved on June 18, 1961, when twelve barrios and twenty sitios of Parang, then part of Cotabato, were separated. The seat of government was designated at Barrio Nabalawag.

In 1977, through Presidential Decree No. 1188, part of its territory was constituted into a separate municipality of Barira, with eastern parts of barangays Nabalawag and Tugaig remained part of the mother municipality.

Former Huk members mainly composed the migrants who later inhabited in present-day Buldon, as well as in Parang and other Muslim-dominated towns in Mindanao. The Economic Development Corporation, at the time of its establishment in 1951 by President Ramon Magsaysay, opened two resettlement areas for them, both administered first by the Armed Forces of the Philippines. Gallego was turned over to the Land Authority in 1976; same as another, Barira, to the Department of Agrarian Reform in 1972, prior to becoming part of the municipality of Barira.

Buldon is among the municipalities inhabited mainly by the Iranun people, along with Matanog and Barira; much parts of these had constituted the Camp Abubakar, the main camp of the Moro Islamic Liberation Front (MILF) since the 1980s. The local government units had held office in either Cotabato City or Parang since the Marcos presidency, with the municipal halls in Buldon and Matanog being almost vacant.

=== Armed conflict ===
==== Early incidents ====
The municipality was among the sites of hostilities since early 1970s, and even during negotiations between the national government and the MILF in the late 1990s. The first recorded encounters occurred in Barangay Garigayan, where Bangon Aratuc led the Moro separatists in clashes with the Philippine Constabulary for more than a month, displacing thousands of civilians in the municipality.

In August 1971, a battle occurred in the town between Muslim armed bands, the Blackshirts, and the constabulary. This was settled through a peace pact between a team of government negotiators and the Muslims, which also led to receiving aid for rehabilitation projects. The Christian–Moro conflict was addressed in the 1980s, during the mayorship of Macarampat Manalao.

==== 1997 peace agreement ====
Buldon was the site of the first phase of ceasefire which was declared for the municipality through what would be the first agreement signed by both panels, on January 27, 1997, which was eventually elevated to a general ceasefire for Mindanao upon signing of the Buldon Ceasefire Agreement in July 27, although negotiations were left unfinished within the presidency of Fidel Ramos. However, before negotiating panels from both sides were to conduct peace talks, on January 16, the rebels fired at the military unit which escorting mayor Manalao, who attempted to visit the municipality where he had never held office since 1995, in Garigayan, as the latter reportedly entered the MILF defense perimeter at Camp Abubakar, leaving 22 people, including two soldiers, dead. Thereafter, clashes erupted in Barangays Kabayuan and Garigayan, and ended when a local agreement was eventually signed. At least 33 were killed from both sides.

On March 16, eleven people were killed in a shelling of an Islamic school by the Philippine Army. On June 19–20, 80 heavily armed members of the MILF launched an attack, government troops later retaliated. Among the casualties were a soldier and several guerillas. Clashes also occurred in Upper Minabay in 1998.

==== 2000 battles ====
Buldon, situated less than 10 kilometers from the camp, was among those municipalities where series of battles occurred, leading to the camp's fall in 2000.

==== Post-battle ====
After a ceasefire agreement was signed by both sides in Kuala Lumpur, Malaysia, in August 2001, on September 27, however, a hundred MILF fighters stormed a vacant military outpost; clashes with government troops followed, killing eight army soldiers and up to 36 MILF members.

== Geography ==
=== Barangays ===
Buldon is politically subdivided into 15 barangays. Each barangay consists of puroks while some have sitios.

- Ampuan
- Aratuc
- Cabayuan
- Calaan (Poblacion)
- Karim(Karim Mopak)
- Dinganen
- Edcor (Gallego Edcor)
- Kulimpang
- Mataya
- Minabay
- Nuyo
- Oring
- Pantawan
- Piers
- Rumidas

=== Climate ===
Climate data for Buldon, Maguindanao del Norte
Month	Jan	Feb	Mar	Apr	May	Jun	Jul	Aug	Sep	Oct	Nov	Dec	Year
Mean daily maximum °C (°F)	28 (82)	28 (82)	28 (82)	29 (84)	28 (82)	27 (81)	27 (81)	27 (81)	27 (81)	27 (81)	27 (81)	28 (82)	28 (82)
Mean daily minimum °C (°F)	22 (72)	22 (72)	22 (72)	23 (73)	23 (73)	23 (73)	22 (72)	22 (72)	22 (72)	22 (72)	23 (73)	22 (72)	22 (72)
Average precipitation mm (inches)	236 (9.3)	225 (8.9)	244 (9.6)	235 (9.3)	304 (12.0)	287 (11.3)	200 (7.9)	175 (6.9)	158 (6.2)	200 (7.9)	287 (11.3)	243 (9.6)	2,794 (110.2)
Average rainy days	24.3	22.3	26.0	27.2	28.3	27.2	25.8	24.8	22.2	25.4	27.2	25.8	306.5
Source: Meteoblue (modeled/calculated data, not measured locally)

== Demographics ==
Population census of Buldon
Year	Pop.	±% p.a.
1918	686	—
1939	2,693	+6.73%
1970	18,549	+6.42%
1975	16,383	−2.46%
1980	12,350	−5.49%
1990	22,730	+6.29%
1995	24,209	+1.19%
2000	26,903	+2.29%
2007	36,937	+4.47%
2010	33,729	−3.25%
2015	35,282	+0.86%
2020	39,684	+2.51%
2024	45,676	+3.43%
Source: Philippine Statistics Authority

== Economy ==
Poverty Incidence of Buldon

Source: Philippine Statistics Authority
