= Datu Blah T. Sinsuat, Maguindanao del Norte =

Municipality in Maguindanao del Norte, Philippines

Datu Blah T. Sinsuat داتو بلاه تي سينسوات West Upi
- Municipality
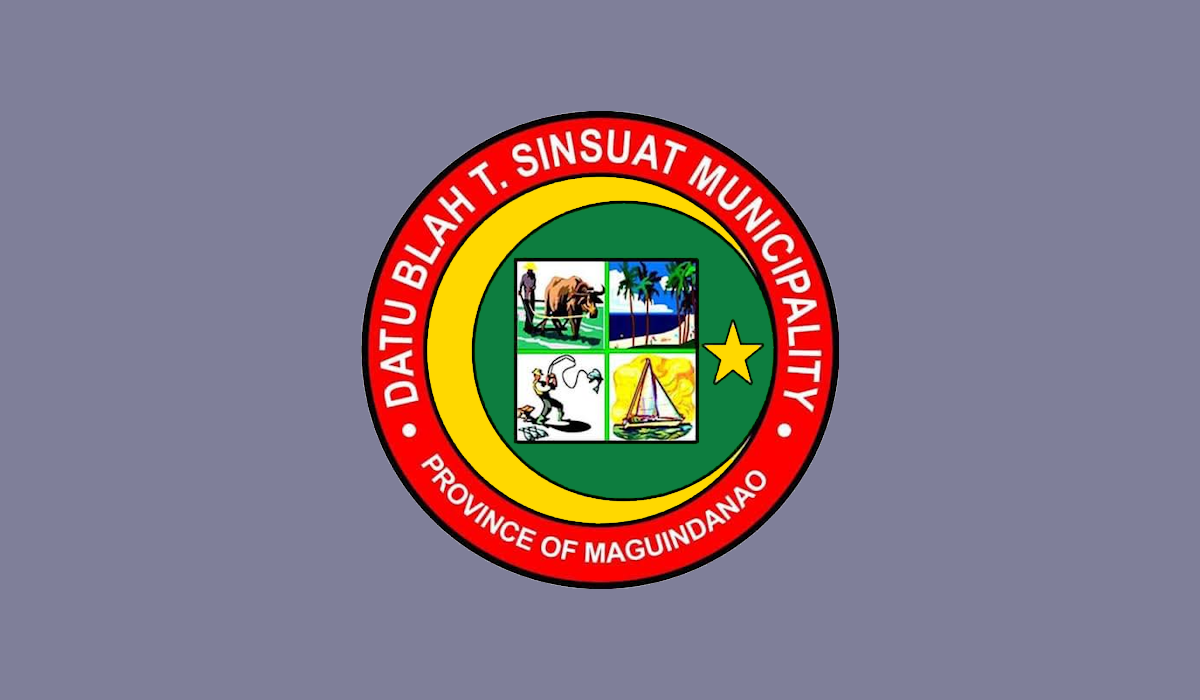
- Flag Seal
- Nickname: Fishing Capital of Maguindanao del Norte
- Map of Maguindanao del Norte with Datu Blah T. Sinsuat highlighted
- Interactive map of Datu Blah T. Sinsuat
- Location within the Philippines
- Coordinates: 7°04′04″N 124°01′09″E
- Country: Philippines
- Region: Bangsamoro Autonomous Region in Muslim Mindanao
- Province: Maguindanao del Norte
- House district: Lone district
- Parliamentary district: 4th district
- Founded: July 15, 2006
- Barangays: 13 (see Barangays)

Government
  - Type: Sangguniang Bayan
  - Mayor: Raida T. Sinsuat
  - Vice Mayor: Bai Mikhaela Marsha T. Sinsuat
  - House Representative: Sittie Shahara "Dimple" I. Mastura
  - Municipal Council: Members: Mikhaela Marsha T. Sinsuat; Allan M. Sinsuat; Datu Bilit S. Sinsuat; Shaidin A. Kuga; Gamassy J. Mustapha; Mantingan T. Talib; Datudido A. Mama; Aldrin M. Empal
  - Electorate: 13,912 voters (2025)

Area
  - Total: 147.21 km^{2} (56.84 sq mi)
- Elevation: 174 m (571 ft)
- Highest elevation: 1,016 m (3,333 ft)
- Lowest elevation: 0 m (0 ft)

Population (2024 census)
  - Total: 152,907
  - Density: 1,038.7/km^{2} (2,690.2/sq mi)
  - Households: 4,741

Economy
  - Income class: 3rd municipal income class
  - Poverty incidence: 53.06% (2023)
  - Revenue: ₱ 224 million (2024)
  - Assets: ₱ 414.8 million (2024)
  - Expenditure: ₱ 167.6 million (2024)
  - Liabilities: ₱ 77.49 million (2024)

Service provider
  - Electricity: Maguindanao Electric Cooperative (MAGELCO)
- Time zone: UTC+8 (PST)
- IDD : area code: +63 (0)64
- Native languages: Maguindanao; Teduray; Tagalog

Datu Blah T. Sinsuat, officially the Municipality of Datu Blah T. Sinsuat (Maguindanaon: Inged nu Datu Blah T. Sinsuat; Iranun: Inged a Datu Blah T. Sinsuat; Tagalog: Bayan ng Datu Blah T. Sinsuat) and commonly known by its proposed name West Upi, is a municipality in the province of Maguindanao del Norte, Philippines. According to the 2024 census, it had a population of 152,907.

== Etymology ==
Datu Blah T. Sinsuat was named after a legislator of the same name (1908–1981) who was Maguindanao's delegate to the 1935 Constitutional Convention and was Cotabato's lone representative in the House of Representatives during the 2nd Congress. The town is also known by the initials, D.B.S.

As the town was originally the western coast of the undivided municipality Upi, Datu Blah Sinsuat is also informally known as West Upi. In 2024, there are proposals to officially rename the town as West Upi.

== History ==
Formerly a part of the town of Upi, Datu Blah T. Sinsuat became another municipality after a plebiscite on July 15, 2006, and pursuant to the Muslim Mindanao Act No. 198 of the ARMM. On October 28, it became a new municipality of the newly created Shariff Kabunsuan province until its nullification by the Supreme Court in July 2008. The orphaned municipality was absorbed by the province of Maguindanao.

This municipality is named after Datu Blah T. Sinsuat (1908–1981), Maguindanao's delegate to the 1935 Constitutional Convention and Cotabato's Lone District Representative to the 2nd Congress of the Philippines.

== Geography ==
=== Barangays ===
Datu Blah T. Sinsuat is politically subdivided into 13 barangays. Each barangay consists of puroks while some have sitios.

- Matuber
- Pura
- Penansaran
- Tubuan
- Nalkan
- Tambak
- Kinimi
- Resa
- Sedem
- Lapaken
- Meti
- Sinipak
- Laguitan

=== Climate ===
Climate data for Datu Blah T. Sinsuat, Maguindanao del Norte
Month	Jan	Feb	Mar	Apr	May	Jun	Jul	Aug	Sep	Oct	Nov	Dec	Year
Mean daily maximum °C (°F)	31 (88)	31 (88)	32 (90)	31 (88)	30 (86)	29 (84)	29 (84)	29 (84)	30 (86)	30 (86)	30 (86)	31 (88)	30 (87)
Mean daily minimum °C (°F)	23 (73)	23 (73)	23 (73)	24 (75)	25 (77)	25 (77)	24 (75)	24 (75)	24 (75)	24 (75)	24 (75)	24 (75)	24 (75)
Average precipitation mm (inches)	119 (4.7)	99 (3.9)	132 (5.2)	147 (5.8)	256 (10.1)	291 (11.5)	287 (11.3)	286 (11.3)	228 (9.0)	227 (8.9)	208 (8.2)	135 (5.3)	2,415 (95.2)
Average rainy days	19.2	17.9	20.9	24.6	29.4	29.1	29.7	28.9	27.2	28.5	27.2	22.5	305.1
Source: Meteoblue (modeled/calculated data, not measured locally)

== Demographics ==
Population census of Datu Blah T. Sinsuat
Year	Pop.	±% p.a.
2007	22,656	—
2010	16,533	−10.83%
2015	25,024	+8.21%
2020	28,243	+2.58%
2024	152,907	+50.00%
Source: Philippine Statistics Authority

== Economy ==
Datu Blah T. Sinsuat is considered as the "fishing capital" of Maguindanao del Norte. Among the marine fauna caught by fishers include groupers, albacore, and blue marlins.

During Siba season, fishers of Datu Blah T. Sinsuat harvests Skipjack tuna off the shore of the town.

=== Gross Domestic Product ===
The Gross Domestic Product of the Municipality (2022) is 9,729,000,000(PHP).
