= Barira =

Municipality in Maguindanao del Norte, Philippines

Barira باريرا
- Municipality
- Municipality of Barira
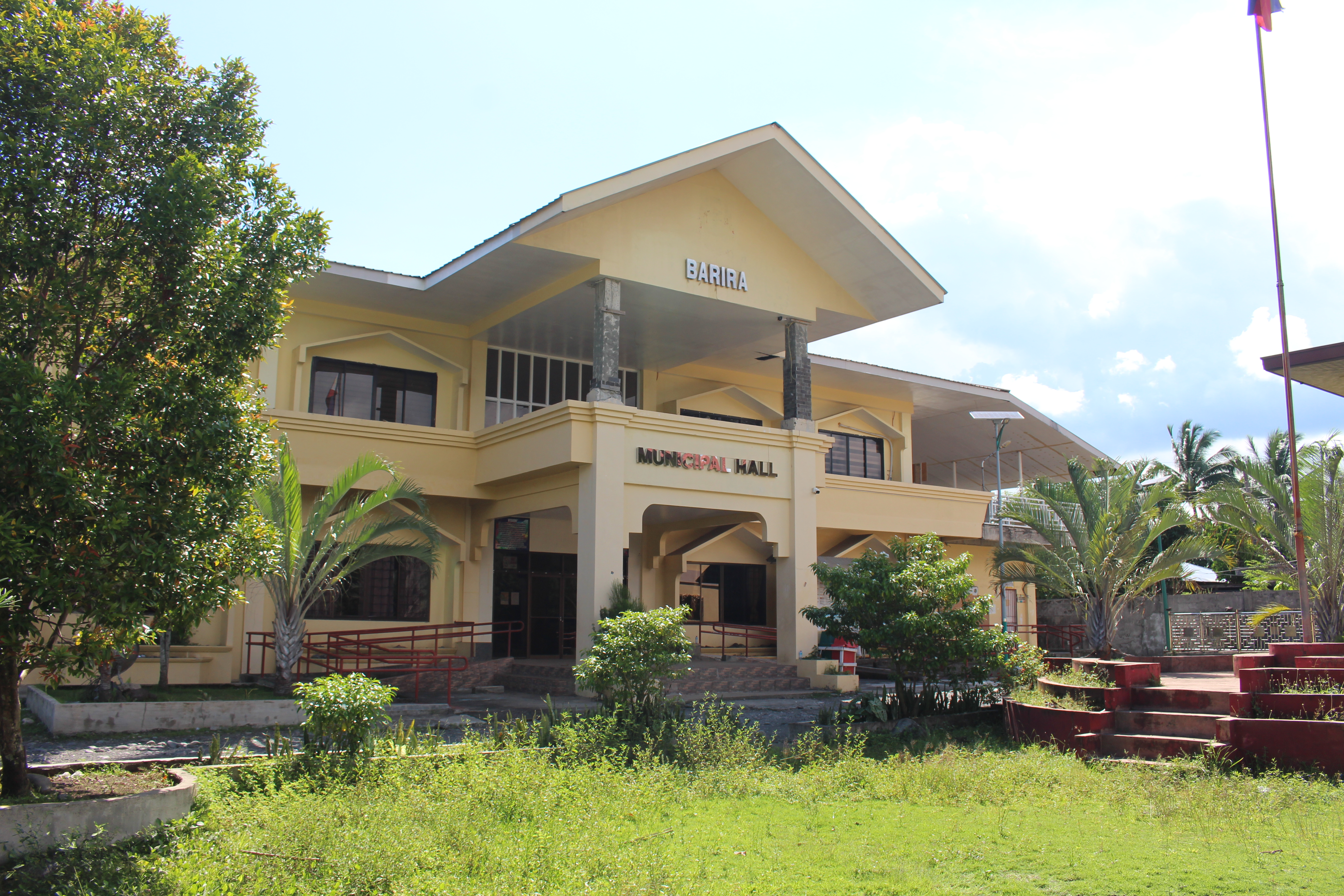
- Municipal Hall

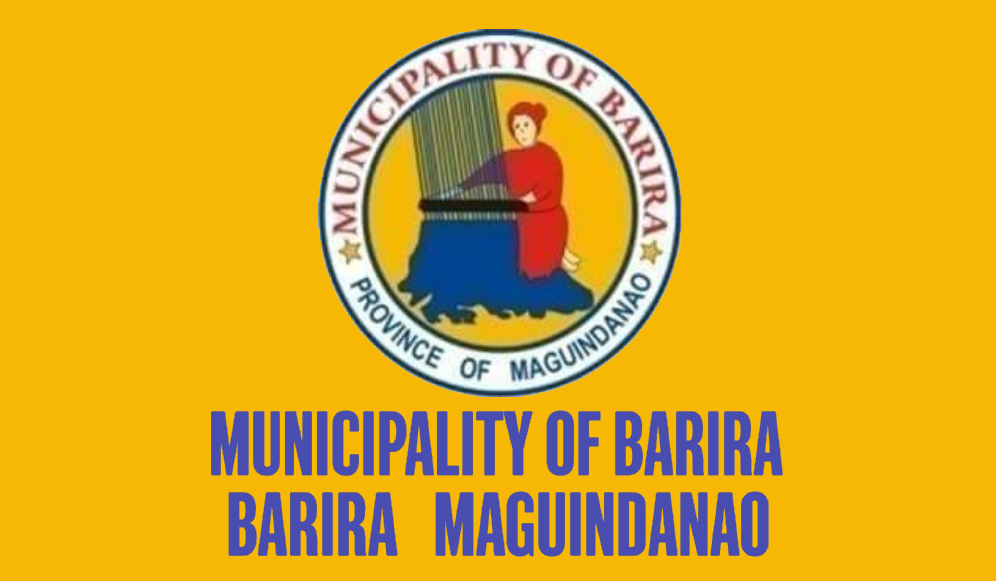
- Flag Seal

- Map of Maguindanao del Norte with Barira highlighted
- Interactive map of Barira
- Location within the Philippines
- Coordinates: 7°28′14″N 124°21′22″E
- Country: Philippines
- Region: Bangsamoro Autonomous Region in Muslim Mindanao
- Province: Maguindanao del Norte
- House district: Lone district
- Parliamentary district: 1st district
- Founded: August 29, 1977
- Barangays: 14 (see Barangays)

Government
  - Type: Sangguniang Bayan
  - Mayor: Abdul Rauf D. Tomawis
  - Vice Mayor: Bahrain M. Dagalangit
  - House Representative: Sittie Shahara "Dimple" I. Mastura
  - Municipal Council: Members: Rajib D. Hadjiracman; Jamel M. Macauyag; Mahadi D. Amatonding; Abdulgani R. Dimasangkay; Marohom B. Tomawis; Bocari P. Tomawis; Kalid A. Malambut; Norhaya S. Brie
  - Electorate: 19,156 voters (2025)

Area
  - Total: 392.61 km^{2} (151.59 sq mi)
- Elevation: 287 m (942 ft)
- Highest elevation: 557 m (1,827 ft)
- Lowest elevation: 139 m (456 ft)

Population (2024 census)
  - Total: 45,676
  - Density: 116.34/km^{2} (301.32/sq mi)
  - Households: 6,008

Economy
  - Income class: 2nd municipal income class
  - Poverty incidence: 46.14% (2023)
  - Revenue: ₱ 193.7 million (2024)
  - Assets: ₱ 895.7 million (2024)
  - Expenditure: ₱ 233.3 million (2024)
  - Liabilities: ₱ 101.8 million (2024)

Service provider
  - Electricity: Maguindanao Electric Cooperative (MAGELCO)
- Time zone: UTC+8 (PST)
- ZIP code: 9614
- PSGC: 1903818000
- IDD : area code: +63 (0)64
- Native languages: Maguindanao; Maranao; Iranun; Tagalog
- Website: www.barira.gov.ph

Barira, officially the Municipality of Barira (Maguindanaon: Inged nu Barira; Iranun and Mëranaw: Inged a Barira; Tagalog: Bayan ng Barira), is a municipality in the province of Maguindanao del Norte, Philippines. According to the 2024 census, it had a population of 45,676.

== History ==
=== Establishment ===
Barira was established through Presidential Decree No. 1188, signed by President Ferdinand Marcos on August 29, 1977, when ten barangays, two of them partially, and 45 sitios of Buldon were separated. The seat of government was designated at Sitio Pedtad, Barangay Lipawan.

The Economic Development Corporation, which was established in 1951 by President Ramon Magsaysay, opened in Barira a resettlement area for former Huk members. It was administered first by the Armed Forces of the Philippines (AFP) until being turned over to the Department of Agrarian Reform in 1972.

Barira is among the municipalities inhabited mainly by the Iranun people, along with Buldon and Matanog; and while the municipality is where Camp Abubakar, the main headquarters of the Moro Islamic Liberation Front (MILF), is situated, much parts of the other two had also constituted the camp since the 1980s. The local government units had held office either in Cotabato City or in Parang since the Marcos presidency; a municipal building was constructed by early 2000s.

=== 2000 battles and the fall of Camp Abubakar ===
Barira was the site of the last of the series of battles that led to the camp's fall on July 9, 2000, ending almost five months of military offensives in the central Mindanao area. On July 1, AFP launched Operation Terminal Velocity, leading to the capture of a number of rebel facilities within the Abubakar complex, with 12 counter-insurgents and 23 MILF fighters reportedly killed.

=== Post-battle ===
The town was part of the province of Shariff Kabunsuan from October 2006 until its nullification by the Supreme Court in July 2008.

== Geography ==
=== Barangays ===
Barira is politically subdivided into 14 barangays. Each barangay consists of puroks while some have sitios.

- Barira (Poblacion)
- Bualan
- Gadung (Mopak)
- Korosoyan
- Lamin
- Liong
- Lipa
- Lipawan
- Marang
- Nabalawag
- Panggao
- Rominimbang
- Togaig
- Minabay

=== Climate ===
Climate data for Barira, Maguindanao del Norte
| Month | Jan | Feb | Mar | Apr | May | Jun | Jul | Aug | Sep | Oct | Nov | Dec | Year |
|---|---|---|---|---|---|---|---|---|---|---|---|---|---|
| Mean daily maximum °C (°F) | 28 (82) | 28 (82) | 29 (84) | 29 (84) | 27 (81) | 26 (79) | 26 (79) | 26 (79) | 27 (81) | 26 (79) | 27 (81) | 27 (81) | 27 (81) |
| Mean daily minimum °C (°F) | 19 (66) | 19 (66) | 19 (66) | 20 (68) | 21 (70) | 20 (68) | 20 (68) | 20 (68) | 20 (68) | 20 (68) | 20 (68) | 19 (66) | 20 (68) |
| Average precipitation mm (inches) | 53 (2.1) | 44 (1.7) | 41 (1.6) | 39 (1.5) | 69 (2.7) | 89 (3.5) | 92 (3.6) | 97 (3.8) | 72 (2.8) | 79 (3.1) | 72 (2.8) | 49 (1.9) | 796 (31.1) |
| Average rainy days | 15.3 | 13.5 | 16.3 | 16.9 | 22.3 | 23.5 | 22.5 | 23.1 | 19.4 | 21.5 | 20.6 | 17.5 | 232.4 |
Source: Meteoblue (modeled/calculated data, not measured locally)

== Demographics ==
Population census of Barira
| Year | Pop. | ±% p.a. |
|---|---|---|
| 1980 | 7,724 | — |
| 1990 | 16,858 | +8.12% |
| 1995 | 17,825 | +1.05% |
| 2000 | 18,296 | +0.56% |
| 2007 | 27,607 | +5.84% |
| 2010 | 19,686 | −11.58% |
| 2015 | 30,004 | +8.36% |
| 2020 | 36,143 | +4.00% |
| 2024 | 45,676 | +5.78% |
Source: Philippine Statistics Authority

== Economy ==
Poverty Incidence of Barira

Source: Philippine Statistics Authority

Gross Domestic Product

The Gross Domestic Product of the Municipality (2022) is 11,074,500,000(PHP).
