= Matanog =

Municipality in Maguindanao del Norte, Philippines

Matanog Ingëd a Matanog Bayan ng Matanog ماتانوج
- Municipality
- Municipality of Matanog
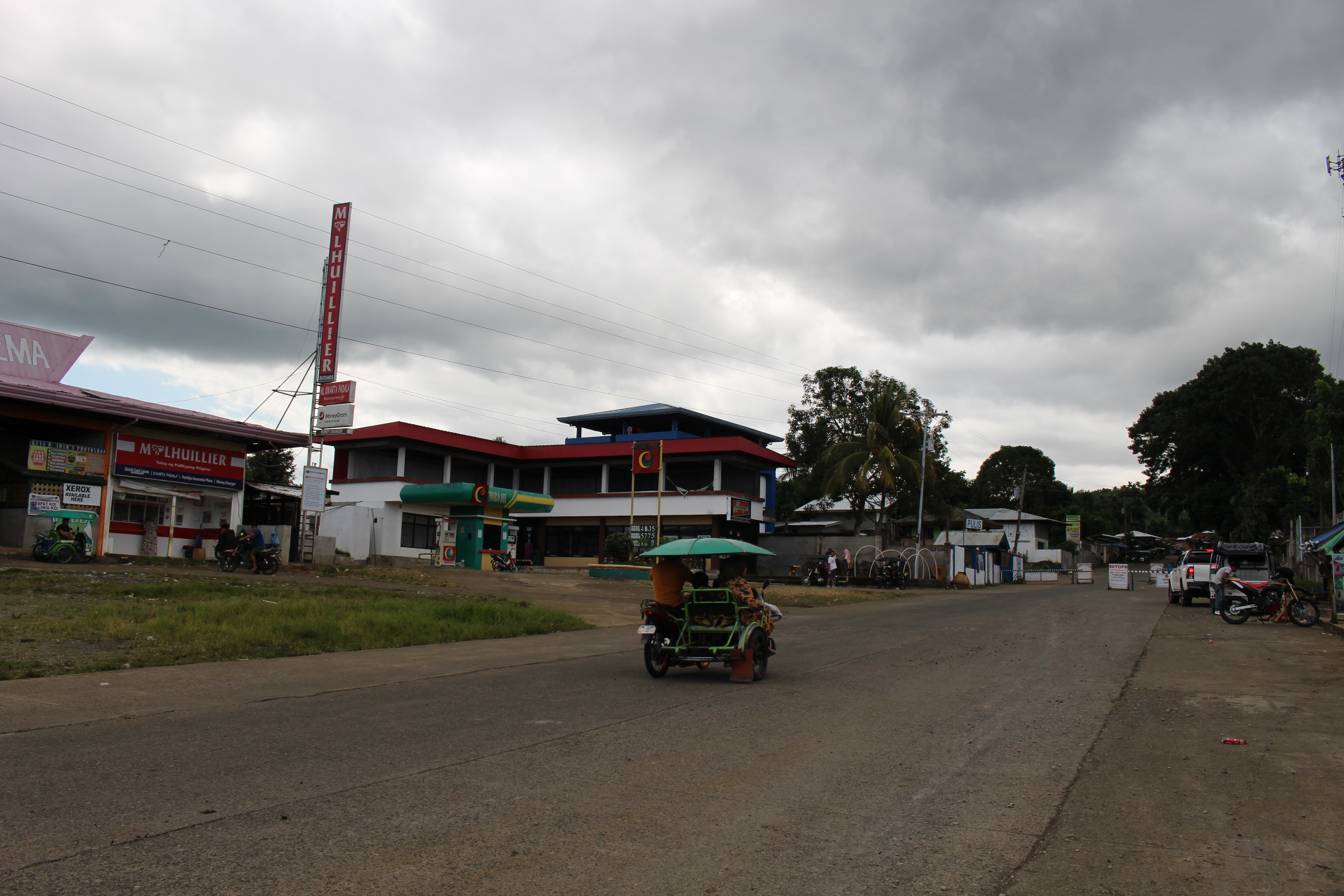
- Poblacion of Matanog

- Seal

- Map of Maguindanao del Norte with Matanog highlighted
- Interactive map of Matanog
- Location within the Philippines
- Coordinates: 7°28′01″N 124°15′33″E
- Country: Philippines
- Region: Bangsamoro Autonomous Region in Muslim Mindanao
- Province: Maguindanao del Norte
- House district: Lone district
- Parliamentary district: 1st district
- Founded: August 25, 1975
- Barangays: 8 (see Barangays)

Government
  - Type: Sangguniang Bayan
  - Mayor: Zohria S. Bansil-Guro
  - Vice Mayor: Sanaira I. Ali
  - House Representative: Sittie Shahara "Dimple" I. Mastura
  - Municipal Council: Members: Malik T. Pandi; Jamael B. Casanguan; Camlon M. Rauro; Zainodin M. Musa; Abdulla D. Macapeges; Suwaib D. Ampa; Abdul Aziz S. Lidasan; Mahde S. Guiamaludin
  - Electorate: 20,380 voters (2025)

Area
  - Total: 146.50 km^{2} (56.56 sq mi)
- Elevation: 328 m (1,076 ft)
- Highest elevation: 1,064 m (3,491 ft)
- Lowest elevation: 7 m (23 ft)

Population (2024 census)
  - Total: 36,034
  - Density: 245.97/km^{2} (637.05/sq mi)
  - Households: 5,711

Economy
  - Income class: 3rd municipal income class
  - Poverty incidence: 51.81% (2023)
  - Revenue: ₱ 170.4 million (2024)
  - Assets: ₱ 717.7 million (2024)
  - Expenditure: ₱ 151.7 million (2024)
  - Liabilities: ₱ 74.51 million (2024)

Service provider
  - Electricity: Maguindanao Electric Cooperative (MAGELCO)
- Time zone: UTC+8 (PST)
- ZIP code: 9613
- PSGC: 1903809000
- IDD : area code: +63 (0)64
- Native languages: Maguindanao; Maranao; Tagalog
- Website: www.matanog.gov.ph

Matanog, officially the Municipality of Matanog (Iranun and Mëranaw: Ingëd a Matanog; Maguindanaon: Inged nu Matanog; Filipino: Bayan ng Matanog; Arabic: بلدية ماتانوج), is a municipality in the province of Maguindanao del Norte, Philippines. According to the 2024 census, it had a population of 49,326.

== History ==
=== Establishment and early years ===
Matanog was established by virtue of Presidential Decree No. 780, signed by President Ferdinand Marcos on August 25, 1975, when six barangays of Parang in what was then Maguindanao were separated. The seat of government was designated at Barangay Langkong.

Matanog is among the municipalities inhabited mainly by the Iranun people, along with Buldon and Barira; much parts of these had constituted the Camp Abubakar, the main camp of the Moro National Liberation Front (MILF) since the 1980s. The local government units had held office either in Cotabato City or in Parang since the Marcos presidency, with the municipal halls in Matanog and Buldon being almost vacant.

Narciso Ramos Highway (Parang–Malabang Road), connecting the present-day provinces of Maguindanao del Norte and Lanao del Sur and was completed on April 15, 1996, was later extended to Langkong junction which became the access road leading to the rebel camp.

=== 2000 battles ===
Matanog was among those municipalities where series of battles occurred, leading to the camp's fall in 2000. Part of the Narciso Ramos Highway in the municipality was heavily fortified; as being the gateway to the camp, became easy for government armor assets to access. During the military's Operation Dominance from April 29 to June 3, MILF installations in eight barangays were captured; 63 soldiers and some 424 rebels were killed.

=== Post-battle ===
The recovery of the municipality following the war of 2000 became difficult due to political rivalry that caused rido between the two factions, Imam and Macapeges–Lidasan clans, one of the region's well-known disputes. The feud began when Nasser Imam defeated incumbent mayor Kahir Macapeges in 2001, with the election results being disputed. It worsened armed hostilities among political clans, especially in 2002; and left nine relatives and two others dead. In what would be the largest settlement, the families formally reconciled in Davao City on January 30, 2008.

The town was part of the province of Shariff Kabunsuan from October 2006 until its nullification by the Supreme Court in July 2008.

== Geography ==
=== Barangays ===
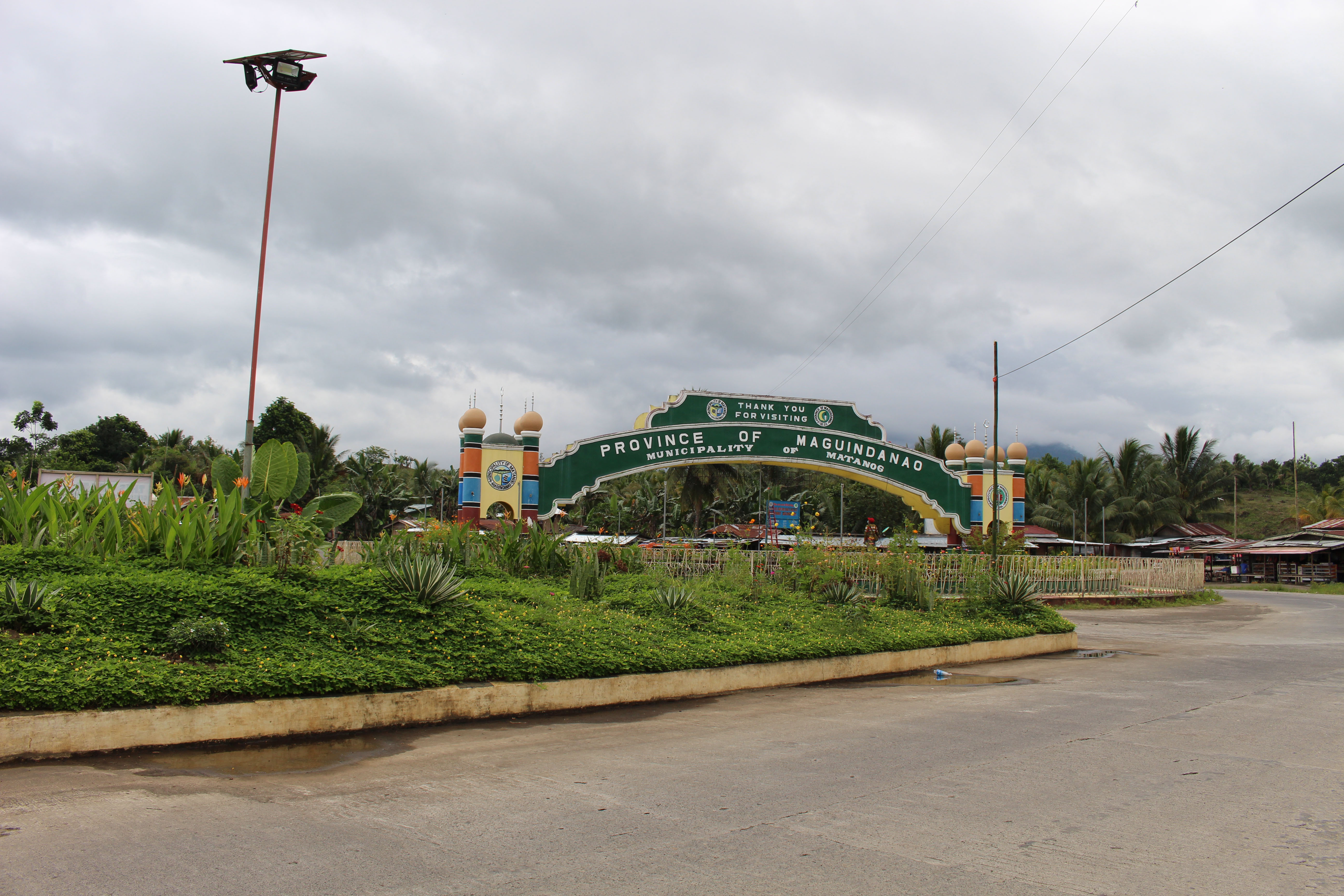
Archway sign near the Lanao del Sur–Maguindanao del Norte boundary

Matanog is politically subdivided into 8 barangays. Each barangay consists of puroks while some have sitios.

- Bayanga Norte
- Bayanga Sur
- Bugasan Norte
- Bugasan Sur (Poblacion)
- Kidama
- Sapad
- Langco
- Langkong

=== Climate ===
Climate data for Matanog, Maguindanao del Norte
Month	Jan	Feb	Mar	Apr	May	Jun	Jul	Aug	Sep	Oct	Nov	Dec	Year
Mean daily maximum °C (°F)	28 (82)	28 (82)	28 (82)	29 (84)	28 (82)	27 (81)	27 (81)	27 (81)	27 (81)	27 (81)	27 (81)	28 (82)	28 (82)
Mean daily minimum °C (°F)	22 (72)	22 (72)	22 (72)	23 (73)	23 (73)	23 (73)	22 (72)	22 (72)	22 (72)	22 (72)	23 (73)	22 (72)	22 (72)
Average precipitation mm (inches)	236 (9.3)	225 (8.9)	244 (9.6)	235 (9.3)	304 (12.0)	287 (11.3)	200 (7.9)	175 (6.9)	158 (6.2)	200 (7.9)	287 (11.3)	243 (9.6)	2,794 (110.2)
Average rainy days	24.3	22.3	26.0	27.2	28.3	27.2	25.8	24.8	22.2	25.4	27.2	25.8	306.5
Source: Meteoblue (modeled/calculated data, not measured locally)

== Demographics ==
Population census of Matanog
Year	Pop.	±% p.a.
1980	8,300	—
1990	14,759	+5.93%
1995	16,018	+1.55%
2000	19,006	+3.73%
2007	36,319	+9.34%
2010	23,269	−14.96%
2015	29,770	+4.80%
2020	36,034	+4.10%
2024	49,326	+7.83%
Source: Philippine Statistics Authority

== Economy ==
Poverty Incidence of Matanog

Source: Philippine Statistics Authority

Gross Domestic Product

The Gross Domestic Product of the Municipality (2022) is 9,128,700,000(PHP).
