= Sultan Mastura =

Municipality in Maguindanao del Norte, Philippines

Sultan Mastura سلطان مستورة
- Municipality
- Municipality of Sultan Mastura
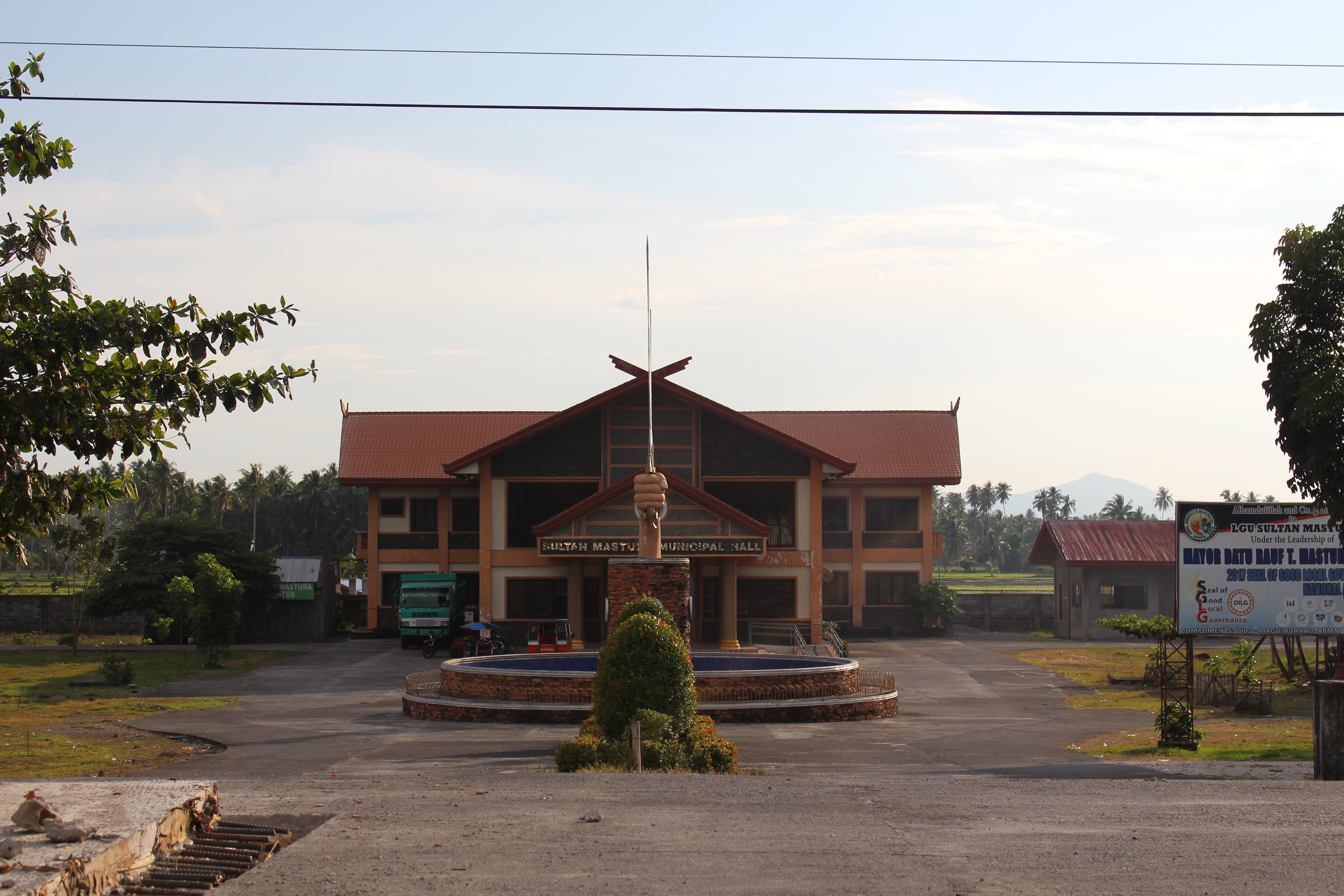
- Municipal Hall of Sultan Mastura

- Seal

- Map of Maguindanao del Norte with Sultan Mastura highlighted
- Interactive map of Sultan Mastura
- Location within the Philippines
- Coordinates: 7°17′00″N 124°18′00″E
- Country: Philippines
- Region: Bangsamoro Autonomous Region in Muslim Mindanao
- Province: Maguindanao del Norte
- House district: Lone district
- Parliamentary district: 5th district
- Founded: April 28, 2003
- Barangays: 13 (see Barangays)

Government
  - Type: Sangguniang Bayan
  - Mayor: Datu Armando T. Mastura Al hajj
  - Vice Mayor: Esmail V. Buradtong
  - House Representative: Sittie Shahara "Dimple" I. Mastura
  - Municipal Council: Members: Maulana Abdulhamid; Aslam Alongan; Esmail Siaman; Yusop Abbas; Swebb Mala; Sadat Odin; Johari Pangal; Paisal Mustapha
  - Electorate: 21,858 voters (2025)

Area
  - Total: 242.07 km^{2} (93.46 sq mi)
- Elevation: 29 m (95 ft)
- Highest elevation: 114 m (374 ft)
- Lowest elevation: 0 m (0 ft)

Population (2024 census)
  - Total: 30,828
  - Density: 127.35/km^{2} (329.84/sq mi)
  - Households: 4,445

Economy
  - Income class: 3rd municipal income class
  - Poverty incidence: 38.89% (2023)
  - Revenue: ₱ 144.2 million (2024)
  - Assets: ₱ 407.7 million (2024)
  - Expenditure: ₱ 144.9 million (2024)
  - Liabilities: ₱ 190.5 million (2024)

Service provider
  - Electricity: Maguindanao Electric Cooperative (MAGELCO)
- Time zone: UTC+8 (PST)
- ZIP code: 9605
- PSGC: 1903824000
- IDD : area code: +63 (0)64
- Native languages: Maguindanao; Iranun; Tagalog

Sultan Mastura, officially the Municipality of Sultan Mastura (Maguindanaon: Ingud nu Sultan Mastura; Iranun: Inged a Sultan Mastura; Tagalog: Bayan ng Sultan Mastura) and commonly known by its alternative name Subpangen, is a municipality in the province of Maguindanao del Norte, Philippines. According to the 2024 census, it had a population of 30,828.

It was created by virtue of the Muslim Mindanao Autonomy Act No. 89, carved from the municipality of Sultan Kudarat. The law was submitted on September 13, 1999, and lapsed into law on November 13, 1999. It was ratified by the people of Sultan Mastura through plebiscite on March 15, 2003. Its corporate existence started on April 28, 2003.

It was part of the province of Shariff Kabunsuan from October 2006 until its nullification by the Supreme Court in July 2008.

== Geography ==
=== Barangays ===
Sultan Mastura is politically subdivided into 13 barangays. Each barangay consists of puroks while some have sitios.

- Balut
- Boliok
- Bungabong
- Dagurongan
- Kirkir
- Macabico (Macabiso)
- Namuken
- Simuay/Seashore
- Solon
- Tambo
- Tapayan
- Tariken
- Tuka

=== Climate ===
Climate data for Sultan Mastura, Maguindanao del Norte
Month	Jan	Feb	Mar	Apr	May	Jun	Jul	Aug	Sep	Oct	Nov	Dec	Year
Mean daily maximum °C (°F)	28 (82)	28 (82)	29 (84)	29 (84)	27 (81)	26 (79)	26 (79)	26 (79)	27 (81)	26 (79)	27 (81)	27 (81)	27 (81)
Mean daily minimum °C (°F)	19 (66)	19 (66)	19 (66)	20 (68)	21 (70)	20 (68)	20 (68)	20 (68)	20 (68)	20 (68)	20 (68)	19 (66)	20 (68)
Average precipitation mm (inches)	53 (2.1)	44 (1.7)	41 (1.6)	39 (1.5)	69 (2.7)	89 (3.5)	92 (3.6)	97 (3.8)	72 (2.8)	79 (3.1)	72 (2.8)	49 (1.9)	796 (31.1)
Average rainy days	15.3	13.5	16.3	16.9	22.3	23.5	22.5	23.1	19.4	21.5	20.6	17.5	232.4
Source: Meteoblue (modeled/calculated data, not measured locally)

== Demographics ==
Population census of Sultan Mastura
Year	Pop.	±% p.a.
2007	25,741	—
2010	21,712	−6.01%
2015	22,261	+0.48%
2020	25,331	+2.76%
2024	30,828	+4.83%
Source: Philippine Statistics Authority

== Economy ==
Poverty Incidence of Sultan Mastura

Source: Philippine Statistics Authority

There is a proposal to build an international airport in Sultan Mastura.

The Gross Domestic Product of the Municipality (2022) is 7,955,700,000(PHP).
