= Datu Odin Sinsuat =

Capital of Maguindanao del Norte, Philippines

Datu Odin Sinsuat Dinaig
- Municipality
- Municipality of Datu Odin Sinsuat
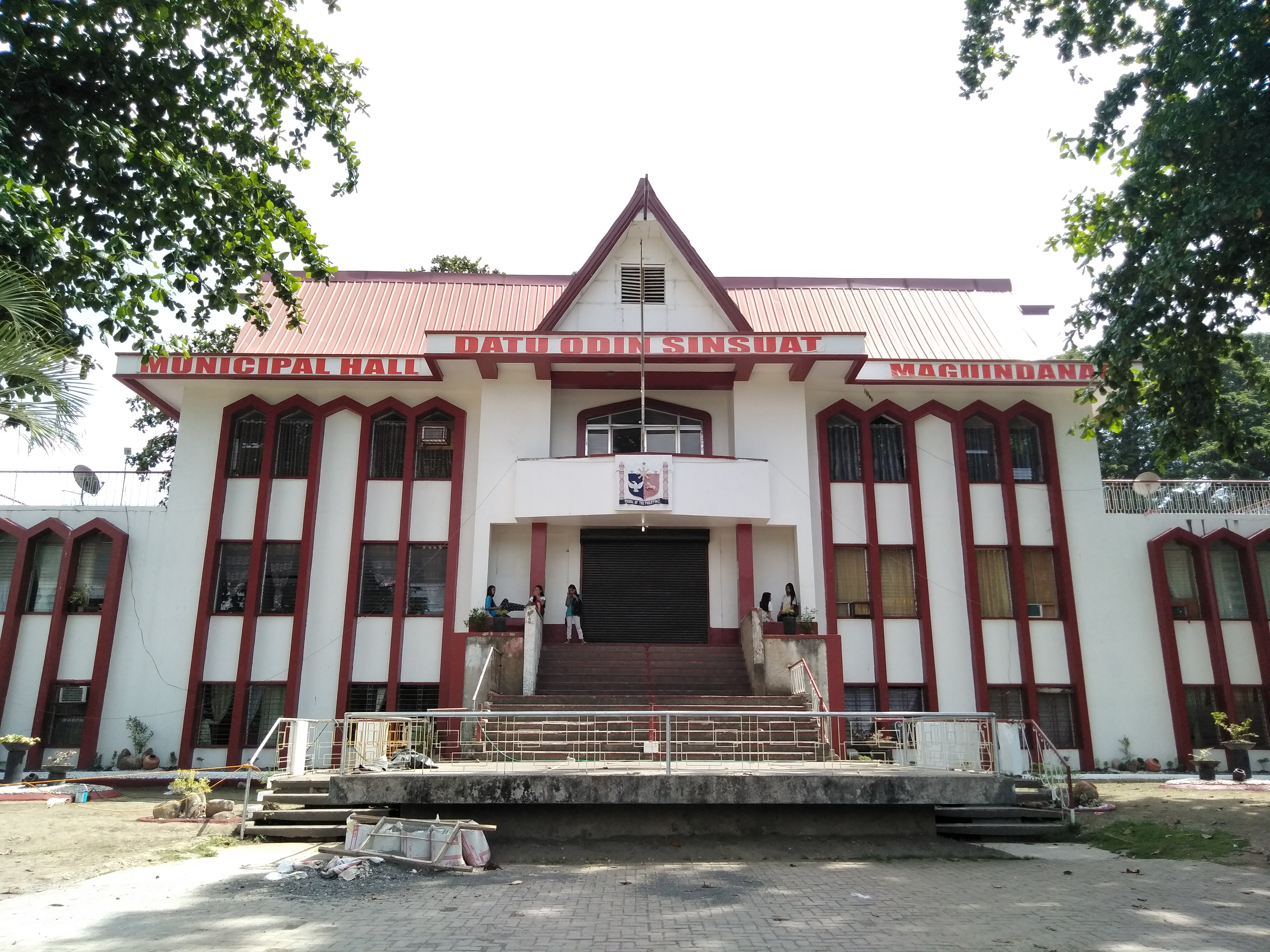
- Datu Odin Sinsuat Town Hall

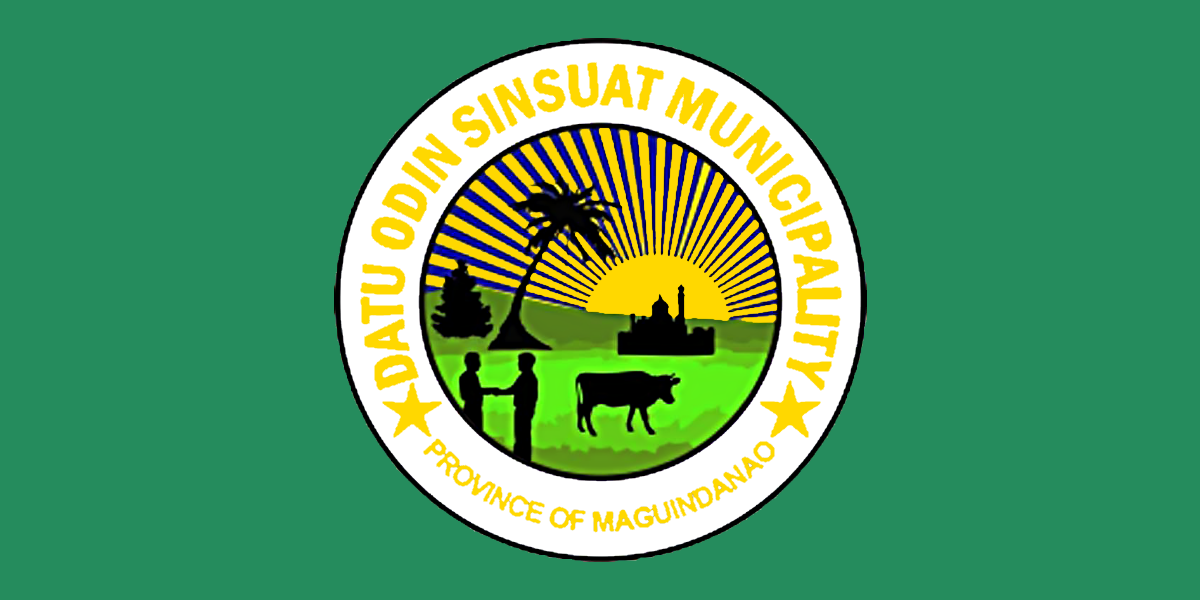
- Flag Seal

- Map of Maguindanao del Norte with Datu Odin Sinsuat highlighted
- Interactive map of Datu Odin Sinsuat
- Location within the Philippines
- Coordinates: 7°11′20″N 124°11′02″E
- Country: Philippines
- Region: Bangsamoro Autonomous Region in Muslim Mindanao
- Province: Maguindanao del Norte
- House district: Lone district
- Parliamentary district: 4th district
- Barangays: 34 (see Barangays)

Government
  - Type: Sangguniang Bayan
  - Mayor: Abdulmain "Baba" P. Abas Sr.
  - Vice Mayor: Datu Bobsteel Sinsuat
  - House Representative: Sittie Shahara I. Mastura
  - Municipal Council: Members: Datu Mohammad Yasser S. Sinsuat; Bai Thalia Zyra S. Biruar; Sophia M. Abas; Datu Alih Jabbar L. Sinsuat; Datu Umbra M. Ambolodto; Mokamad M. Nur; Andidatu S. Mohamad; Medzecail M. Pinguiaman
  - Electorate: 82,586 voters (2025)

Area
  - Total: 461.80 km^{2} (178.30 sq mi)
- Elevation: 68 m (223 ft)
- Highest elevation: 361 m (1,184 ft)
- Lowest elevation: 0 m (0 ft)

Population (2024 census)
  - Total: 152,907
  - Density: 331.11/km^{2} (857.57/sq mi)
  - Households: 20,284

Economy
  - Income class: 1st municipal income class
  - Poverty incidence: 39.79% (2023)
  - Revenue: ₱ 454.6 million (2024)
  - Assets: ₱ 273.9 million (2024)
  - Expenditure: ₱ 434.4 million (2024)
  - Liabilities: ₱ 125.4 million (2024)

Service provider
  - Electricity: Cotabato Light and Power Company (CLPC)
- Time zone: UTC+8 (PST)
- ZIP code: 9601
- PSGC: 1903807000
- IDD : area code: +63 (0)64
- Native languages: Maguindanao; Tagalog
- Website: www.datuodinsinsuat.gov.ph

Datu Odin Sinsuat, officially the Municipality of Datu Odin Sinsuat (Maguindanaon: Inged nu Datu Odin Sinsuat; Jawi: داتو أودين سينسوات; Tagalog: Bayan ng Datu Odin Sinsuat), is a municipality and capital of the province of Maguindanao del Norte, Philippines. According to the 2024 census, it had a population of 31,863.

The town's name was formerly known as Dinaig. It was changed to Datu Odin Sinsuat in 1994, by virtue of Muslim Mindanao Autonomy Act No. 29.

The municipality is home to the Awang Domestic Airport that serves the province and Cotabato City.

== History ==
Datu Odin Sinsuat (Dinaig) was organized as a municipality through Executive Order No. 82 signed by President Manuel Roxas on August 18, 1947. In 1955, the barrio of Upi was separated from Datu Odin Sinsuat to become the town of Upi.

The town was part of the province of Shariff Kabunsuan and served as its capital from October 2006 until its nullification by the Supreme Court in July 2008.

In 2023, there were proposals to create two new municipalities out of Datu Odin Sinsuat, which was met with opposition from town officials, who suggested the town be converted into a component city instead. On 2023, the Bangsamoro parliament approved Parliament Bill Nos. 190 and 191, both seeking to carve the proposed municipalities of Datu Balabaran Sinsuat and Sheik Abas Hamza from Datu Odin Sinsuat; the measure gained mixed reactions, with United Bangsamoro Justice Party (UBJP) and their supporters favoring and town officials and their supporters opposing. However, the vote was shelved after the Supreme Court ruled on August 20, 2024, that provisions of the enabling act passed by the Bangsamoro government for the plebiscite were unconstitutional, particularly allowing only voters from barangays of the would-be municipalities to participate in the exercise.

== Geography ==
=== Barangays ===
Datu Odin Sinsuat is politically subdivided into 34 barangays. Each barangay consists of puroks while some have sitios.

- Ambolodto
- Awang
- Badak
- Bagoenged
- Baka
- Benolen
- Bitu
- Bongued
- Bugawas
- Capiton
- Dados
- Dalican
- Datu Mustapha B. Ala
- Dinaig Proper
- Dulangan
- Kakar
- Kenebeka
- Kurintem
- Kusiong
- Labungan
- Linek
- Makir
- Margues
- Mompong
- Nekitan
- Semba
- Sibuto
- Sifaren (Sifaran)
- Tambak
- Tamontaka
- Tanuel
- Tapian
- Taviran
- Tenonggos

=== Climate ===
Climate data for Datu Odin Sinsuat, Maguindanao del Norte
Month	Jan	Feb	Mar	Apr	May	Jun	Jul	Aug	Sep	Oct	Nov	Dec	Year
Mean daily maximum °C (°F)	31 (88)	32 (90)	32 (90)	32 (90)	31 (88)	29 (84)	29 (84)	29 (84)	30 (86)	29 (84)	30 (86)	31 (88)	30 (87)
Mean daily minimum °C (°F)	21 (70)	21 (70)	21 (70)	23 (73)	23 (73)	23 (73)	23 (73)	23 (73)	23 (73)	23 (73)	23 (73)	22 (72)	22 (72)
Average precipitation mm (inches)	30 (1.2)	19 (0.7)	25 (1.0)	24 (0.9)	64 (2.5)	88 (3.5)	102 (4.0)	105 (4.1)	76 (3.0)	82 (3.2)	60 (2.4)	26 (1.0)	701 (27.5)
Average rainy days	9.8	8.5	11.3	11.9	21.6	23.9	24.1	24.5	20.9	21.8	16.8	11.8	206.9
Source: Meteoblue (modeled/calculated data, not measured locally)

== Demographics ==
Population census of Datu Odin Sinsuat
Year	Pop.	±% p.a.
1918	6,565	—
1939	14,196	+3.74%
1948	56,439	+16.57%
1960	44,164	−2.02%
1970	42,827	−0.31%
1975	53,593	+4.60%
1980	48,353	−2.04%
1990	52,370	+0.80%
1995	59,841	+2.53%
2000	71,569	+3.91%
2007	103,765	+5.26%
2010	76,332	−10.57%
2015	99,210	+5.12%
2020	116,768	+3.49%
2024	152,907	+6.69%
Source: Philippine Statistics Authority

== Economy ==
Poverty Incidence of Datu Odin Sinsuat

Source: Philippine Statistics Authority

Gross Domestic Product

As of 2022 the gross domestic product (GDP) of Datu Odin Sinsuat is ₱24,129,300,000.

== Tourism ==
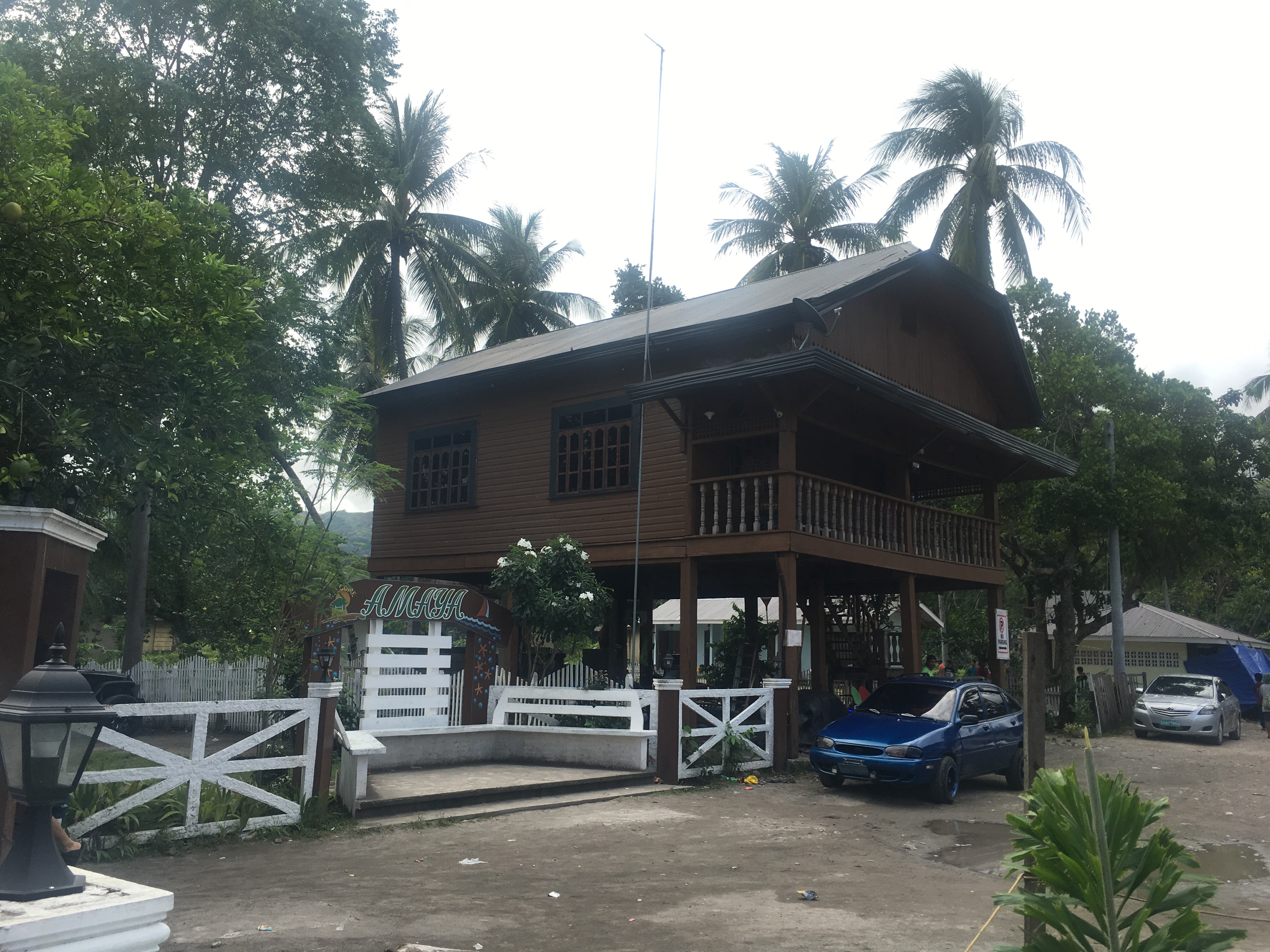
Amaya Beach Resort at Barangay Kusiong

- Mount Minandar is known for its green color due to being dominantly covered with grass. It is a two-hour hike from the foot to the summit of the mountain. It is located at the Barangay kusiong.
- Blue Lagoon is also known as Enchanted Lagoon because, according to the old people living nearby, there are enchantresses living in it. This deep lagoon situated at the Barangay Margues is the top tourist attraction of the municipality.
- Kusiong Beach is a grayish sand beach with a lot of resorts like Amaya Beach Resort, Sahara Beach Resort, and the newest Precious Cabana Resort. This is the nearest beach in Cotabato City.
- Masjid Datu Untong Balabaran of Taviran is a native pagoda-style mosque, one of the last pagoda-style mosques in the Philippines.

== See also ==
- Mado Hot Spring National Park
