= Mangudadatu =

Mangudadatu is a surname. Notable people with the surname include:

- Esmael Mangudadatu (born 1968), Filipino politician
- Dong Mangudadatu (born 1970), Filipino politician
- Mariam Mangudadatu (born 1973), Filipina politician
- Pax Mangudadatu, Filipino politician
- Pax Ali Mangudadatu (born 1997), Filipino politician
- Suharto Mangudadatu (born 1969), Filipino politician
