= 2022 Maguindanao division plebiscite =

- September 17, 2022
- Are you in favor in dividing the province of Maguindanao into two separate provinces that will be called Maguindanao del Norte and Maguindanao del Sur pursuant to Republic Act Number 11550?
- Outcome: Proposal accepted

Results
| Choice | Votes | % |
|---|---|---|
| Yes | 706,558 | 99.27% |
| No | 5,209 | 0.73% |
| Valid votes | 711,767 | 100.00% |
| Invalid or blank votes | 0 | 0.00% |
| Total votes | 711,767 | 100.00% |
| Registered voters/turnout | 818,790 | 86.93% |
- Results by municipality;

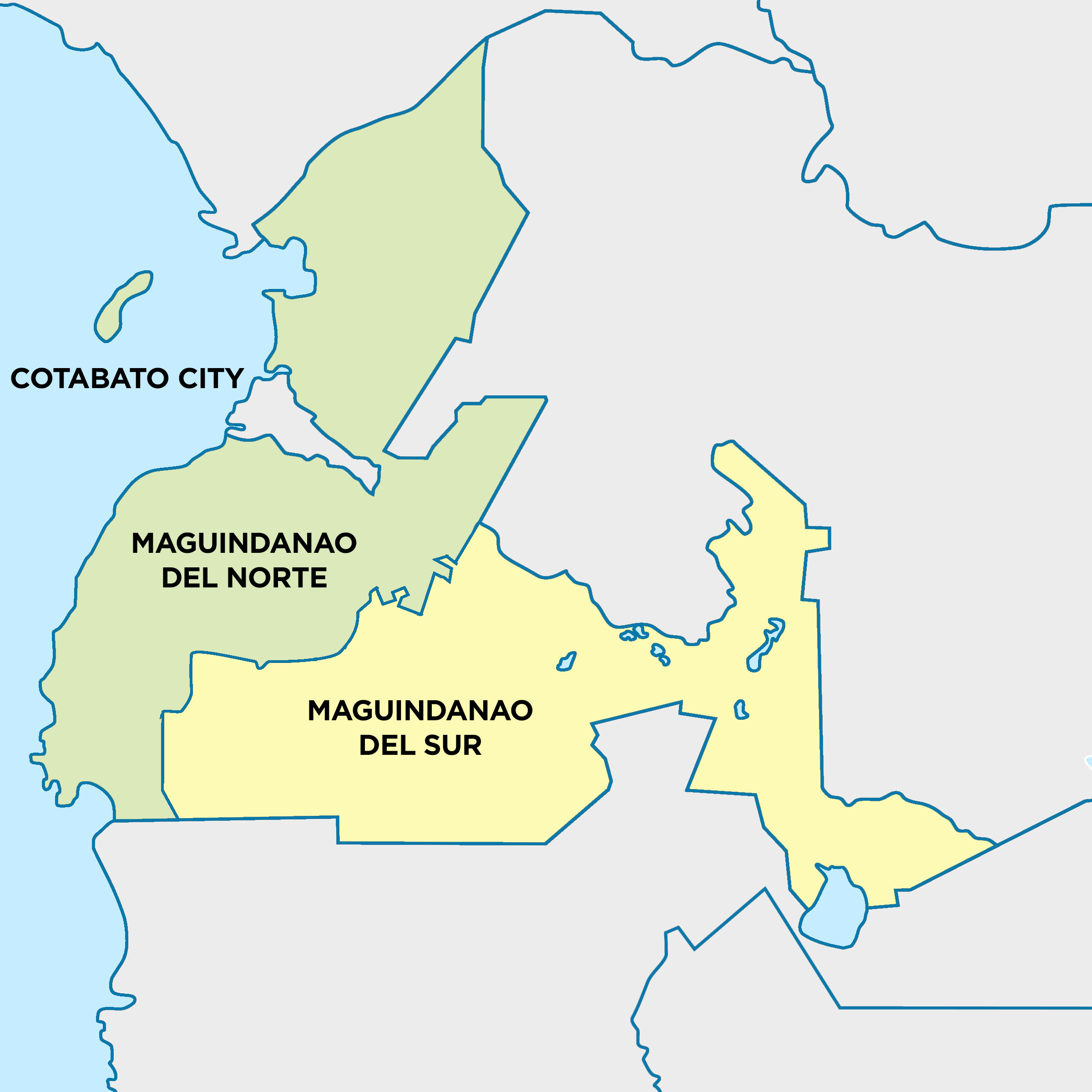
Map of Maguindanao divided into two: Maguindanao del Norte and Maguindanao del Sur

The Maguindanao division plebiscite was held in the province of Maguindanao, Philippines, on September 17, 2022, more than four months after the May 9 national and local elections, following its postponement from its originally scheduled date in or before August 2021. As required by Republic Act No. 11550, it was conducted to seek the consent of the residents of Maguindanao to divide the province into two separate provinces, Maguindanao del Norte and Maguindanao del Sur.

The proposal was approved by 99% of voters and officially took effect on September 18, 2022, paving the way for the division of the province.

== Background ==
=== Shariff Kabunsuan ===
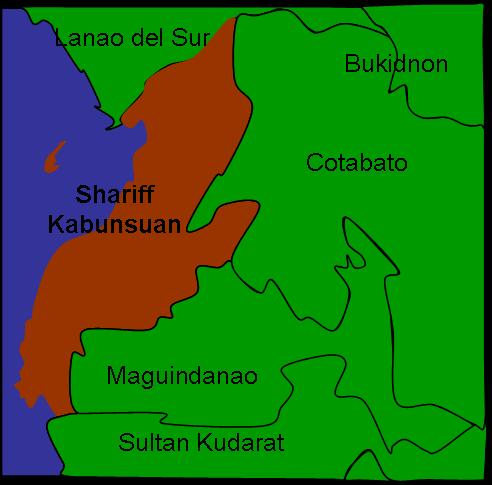
Map of Shariff Kabunsuan

The traces of the proposed division go back to the formation of Shariff Kabunsuan. The province was established by Muslim Mindanao Autonomy Act No. 201 of the ARMM Regional Legislative Assembly. It was composed of 11 municipalities: Barira, Buldon, Datu Blah T. Sinsuat, Kabuntalan, Matanog, Northern Kabuntalan, Parang, Sultan Kudarat, Sultan Mastura, and Upi, with Datu Odin Sinsuat as its designated capital. Cotabato City became part of Shariff Kabunsuan, but for geographical and statistical purposes only. However, the province was short-lived due to the Supreme Court case Sema v. COMELEC, citing that only Congress shall have the power to create legislative districts, and in turn, cities and provinces.

=== Legislative history ===
In 2017, Maguindanao 1st district representative Bai Sandra Sema filed House Bill No. 5185, which seeks to divide Maguindanao into two: Maguindanao North and Maguindanao South. Maguindanao North would have had the same composition as the former province of Shariff Kabunsuan, with Datu Odin Sinsuat as its designated capital. However, the bill did not get past the 17th Congress.

During the 18th Congress in August 2019, Maguindanao 2nd district representative Esmael Mangudadatu filed House Bill No. 3405 in order to create Maguindanao North. Its municipalities would have been composed of the former municipalities of Shariff Kabunsuan, along with Datu Anggal Midtimbang and Talitay (Sultan Sumagka). However, its designated capital was the municipality of Sultan Kudarat, which differed from the other bills filed.

In September 2019, Maguindanao 1st district Datu Roonie Sinsuat Sr. filed House Bill No. 4840 in order to create Western Maguindanao. It would also have been composed of the former municipalities of Shariff Kabunsuan, along with the additional municipalities of Talitay (Sultan Sumagka) and South Upi.

Consolidated as House Bill No. 6413, it became the final version of the act that would split Maguindanao into two: Northern Maguindanao and Southern Maguindanao. Northern Maguindanao would be consisted of 12 municipalities:

- Barira
- Buldon
- Datu Blah T. Sinsuat
- Datu Odin Sinsuat
- Kabuntalan
- Matanog
- Northern Kabuntalan
- Parang
- Sultan Kudarat
- Sultan Mastura
- Talitay (Sultan Sumagka)
- Upi

Meanwhile, Southern Maguindanao would be consisted of 24 municipalities:

- Ampatuan
- Buluan
- Datu Abdullah Sangki
- Datu Anggal Midtimbang
- Datu Hoffer Ampatuan
- Datu Montawal
- Datu Paglas
- Datu Piang
- Datu Salibo
- Datu Saudi Ampatuan
- Datu Unsay
- General Salipada K. Pendatun
- Guindulungan
- Mamasapano
- Mangudadatu
- Pagalungan
- Paglat
- Pandag
- Rajah Buayan
- Shariff Aguak
- Shariff Saydona Mustapha
- South Upi
- Sultan sa Barongis
- Talayan

Northern Maguindanao would resemble the original territory of Shariff Kabunsuan with the addition of Talitay (Sultan Sumagka). The final designated capital for Northern Maguindanao would be Datu Odin Sinsuat. The capital of Southern Maguindanao would be Buluan. The bill was passed by the 18th Congress on February 27, 2020. Senator Francis Tolentino co-sponsored the house bill in the Senate, citing the need for better delivery of government services within the province. Senator Migz Zubiri shared the same sentiment. The bill was amended by the Senate on March 9, 2021, and the amendments were concurred in by the House of Representatives on March 22, 2021.

=== Republic Act No. 11550 ===
On May 21, 2021, President Rodrigo Duterte signed Republic Act No. 11550.

- Section 54 of the law mandates all obligations, debts, and assets shall be shared or paid equally by the newly created provinces.
- Section 50 of the law makes Maguindanao del Sur the mother province and the elected governor of the original Maguindanao province shall assume as governor of Maguindanao del Sur. The vice governor or any highest-ranking official of the Maguindanao Provincial Board who is a resident of Maguindanao del Norte will serve as acting governor. In the event that a resident of Maguindanao del Norte is elected as governor of Maguindanao, he/she will only hold office until a resident of Maguindanao del Sur will take over through the next local election. All other vacancies in the provincial board will be appointed by the President of the Philippines.
- Section 48 states that the expense of the provincial division plebiscite shall be borne out of the budget of the original Maguindanao province and neither the BARMM government nor the national government.
- Section 11 mandates all elected officials to hold office in the designated provincial capital stated in Section 5. They may opt to hold office at any municipality outside the capital within the province for a period of not more than seven working days in any given month.
- Section 9 also states that Cotabato City, an independent-component city no longer under the jurisdiction of the undivided Maguindanao, is to be part of the congressional district of Maguindanao del Norte.

== Preparation ==
=== Scheduling ===
Presidential spokesperson Harry Roque announced that President Duterte signed into law the bill dividing Maguindanao on May 27, 2021. The Maguindanao provincial government later stated that they have set aside 120 million pesos for the plebiscite, and that they were waiting for the Commission on Elections to set the day of the plebiscite. The enabling law mandated that COMELEC should schedule the plebiscite around August 2021, but COMELEC decided to postpone it until after the 2022 general election.

On June 22, 2022, the COMELEC en banc approved the date for the plebiscite on September 17, 2022, to ratify the law dividing the province into Maguindanao del Norte and Maguindanao del Sur.

In August 2022, the commission started printing of ballots for this plebiscite and plebiscites in three other areas. A total of 818,790 ballots will be printed.

=== Question ===
The question is written in Filipino both in Latin letters and in Jawi or Arabic letters. Voters were opted to write in "yes" or "oo", or in Jawi as "وو" or "يِسْ" if they agree; or "no" or "hindi" or in Jawi as "هِنْدِ" or "نُ" if they oppose the proposal.:
In Filipino written in Latin Letters:

Pumapayag ka ba na hatiin ang probinsiya ng Maguindanao sa dalawang (2) hiwalay na probinsiya na kikilalanin bilang Maguindanao del Norte at Maguindanao del Sur alinsunod sa Batas Republika Bilang 11550?

In Filipino written in Jawi Letters:

فُمَفَيَغْ كَبَا نَا حَتِءنْ ااَنْغْ فْرُبِنْسِيَ نَنْغْ مَغِيِنْدانَاوْ سا دَلَوَنْغْ (2) هِوَالَيْ نَا فْرُبِنْسِيَ نَا قِكِلَلَنِنْ بِلَنْغْ مَغِيِنْدانَاوْ دِل نُرْتِ اَتْ مَغِيِنْدانَاوْ دِل سُوُرْ اَلِنْسُنُدْ سَا بَتَاسْ رِفُبْلِكَ بِلاَنْغْ 11550؟

English Translation:

Are you in favor in dividing the province of Maguindanao into two separate provinces that will be called Maguindanao del Norte and Maguindanao del Sur pursuant to Republic Act Number 11550?

== Campaign ==
Local officials, including representative from Maguindanao's 1st district Dimple Mastura, encouraged voters to vote for division. Provincial administrator Cyrus Torreña appealed to the members of the Maguindanao Provincial Board to support the division.

The United Bangsamoro Justice Party, the political arm of the Moro Islamic Liberation Front, announced it is for division. Mohagher Iqbal urged all of their members to vote "yes", saying "Dividing the province will bring the government closer to the people."

A week before the plebiscite a group called "The Interfaith for Peace and Clean Election" requested to the commission to postpone the election. Its coordinator Goldy Omelio said that many of the residents do not know of the upcoming plebiscite. Omelio added that politicians for division were aggressive in campaigning for division.

Meanwhile, the Roman Catholic Archdiocese of Cotabato's prelate Angelito Lampon encouraged the faithful to vote, without stating preference on whether to divide or not. Lampon said that the plebiscite is a mere formality due to lack of clear opposition to division. He stressed that what happens next, if the new provincial officials will be elected or appointed, "is more dangerous".

== Results ==
The Commission on Elections (COMELEC) reported that all voting precincts opened on time except one in Talayan, wherein it only opened thirty minutes late.

COMELEC reported no election-related incidents citing statements from law enforcement authorities. Poll watchdog National Citizens' Movement for Free Elections (NAMFREL), with other groups, described the plebiscite processes as smooth and peaceful; cited generally quick voting process in polling sites and transparency in counting and canvassing of votes.

While both NAMFREL and the poll watchdog Legal Network for Truthful Elections (LENTE) reported common problems encountered by voters, they observed in voting centers that COVID-19 protocols were not much enforced and followed.

As expected, results were announced by COMELEC on September 18. Majority of voters favored the division, according to the initial data. The voter turnout is the second highest for province-wide plebiscites, only behind that of the 1998 plebiscite creating and taking Compostela Valley from Davao del Norte. Meanwhile, the plebiscite is said to be the most participated in terms of number of registered and actual voters.

The voter turnout exceeded a prediction by COMELEC which was at least 60%. Earlier, NAMFREL observed a low voter turnout especially in Upi and Buluan; however in Talitay, about 80% of voters were reportedly already voted by morning and despite a report that some voters did not participate due to security reasons, the plebiscite had been peaceful. Observations from LENTE stated that voting influx peaked 30 minutes after the polling precincts opened, same duration later than expected.

Official results show eight municipalities, all from the proposed Maguindanao del Sur, unanimously voting for division: Ampatuan, Datu Abdullah Sangki, Datu Anggal Midtimbang, Datu Montawal, Mamasapano, Paglat, Shariff Saydona Mustapha and Talayan.

Are you in favor of dividing the province of Maguindanao into two separate provinces that will be called Maguindanao del Norte and Maguindanao del Sur?
| Choice | Votes | % |
|---|---|---|
| For | 706,558 | 99.27 |
| Against | 5,209 | 0.73 |
| Total | 711,767 | 100.00 |
| Valid votes | 711,767 | 100.00 |
| Invalid/blank votes | 0 | 0.00 |
| Total votes | 711,767 | 100.00 |
| Registered voters/turnout | 818,791 | 86.93 |
Source: COMELEC

=== By municipality ===
| Municipality | Yes | | No | | Valid votes |
| Municipality | Total | % | Total | % | Valid votes |
|---|---|---|---|---|---|
| Ampatuan | 16,821 | 100.00 | 0 | 0.00 | 16,821 |
| Barira | 18,876 | 99.46 | 102 | 0.54 | 18,978 |
| Buldon | 21,388 | 99.67 | 71 | 0.33 | 21,459 |
| Buluan | 20,331 | 99.85 | 30 | 0.15 | 20,361 |
| Datu Abdullah Sangki | 23,461 | 100.00 | 0 | 0.00 | 23,461 |
| Datu Anggal Midtimbang | 15,305 | 100.00 | 0 | 0.00 | 15,305 |
| Datu Blah T. Sinsuat | 11,208 | 98.66 | 152 | 1.34 | 11,360 |
| Datu Hoffer Ampatuan | 10,488 | 97.87 | 228 | 2.13 | 10,716 |
| Datu Montawal | 21,256 | 100.00 | 0 | 0.00 | 21,256 |
| Datu Odin Sinsuat | 80,256 | 100.00 | 1 | 0.00 | 80,257 |
| Datu Paglas | 22,374 | 99.98 | 4 | 0.02 | 22,378 |
| Datu Piang | 14,381 | 99.72 | 40 | 0.28 | 14,421 |
| Datu Salibo | 10,597 | 96.79 | 351 | 3.21 | 10,948 |
| Datu Saudi Ampatuan | 20,022 | 99.95 | 10 | 0.05 | 20,032 |
| Datu Unsay | 8,101 | 99.17 | 68 | 0.83 | 8,169 |
| General Salipada K. Pendatun | 19,506 | 99.95 | 10 | 0.05 | 19,516 |
| Guindulungan | 12,042 | 99.23 | 93 | 0.77 | 12,135 |
| Kabuntalan | 11,029 | 99.19 | 90 | 0.81 | 11,119 |
| Mamasapano | 14,443 | 100.00 | 0 | 0.00 | 14,443 |
| Mangudadatu | 12,346 | 99.95 | 6 | 0.05 | 12,352 |
| Matanog | 16,648 | 99.84 | 27 | 0.16 | 16,675 |
| Northern Kabuntalan | 10,377 | 99.72 | 29 | 0.28 | 10,406 |
| Pagalungan | 22,981 | 99.95 | 12 | 0.05 | 22,993 |
| Paglat | 10,873 | 100.00 | 0 | 0.00 | 10,873 |
| Pandag | 10,781 | 99.93 | 8 | 0.07 | 10,789 |
| Parang | 46,183 | 98.85 | 537 | 1.15 | 46,720 |
| Rajah Buayan | 13,385 | 99.94 | 8 | 0.06 | 13,393 |
| Shariff Aguak | 18,641 | 99.35 | 122 | 0.65 | 18,763 |
| Shariff Saydona Mustapha | 8,434 | 100.00 | 0 | 0.00 | 8,434 |
| South Upi | 24,252 | 92.71 | 1,907 | 7.29 | 26,159 |
| Sultan Kudarat | 59,395 | 99.87 | 75 | 0.13 | 59,470 |
| Sultan Mastura | 8,643 | 99.63 | 32 | 0.37 | 8,675 |
| Sultan sa Barongis | 11,360 | 99.08 | 105 | 0.92 | 11,465 |
| Talitay (Sultan Sumagka) | 15,120 | 99.02 | 150 | 0.98 | 15,270 |
| Talayan | 17,329 | 100.00 | 0 | 0.00 | 17,329 |
| Upi | 29,018 | 96.87 | 938 | 3.13 | 29,956 |
| Maguindanao | 707,651 | 99.27 | 5,206 | 0.73 | 712,857 |

Source: One News PH and CNN Philippines

=== By proposed province ===
| Proposed province | Yes | | No | | Valid votes |
| Proposed province | Total | % | Total | % | Valid votes |
|---|---|---|---|---|---|
| Maguindanao del Norte | 328,141 | 99.33 | 2,204 | 0.67 | 330,345 |
| Maguindanao del Sur | 379,510 | 99.22 | 3,002 | 0.79 | 382,512 |
| Maguindanao | 707,651 | 99.27 | 5,206 | 0.73 | 712,857 |

Source: One News PH and CNN Philippines

== Aftermath ==
After voters voted overwhelmingly for division, COMELEC will issue a legal opinion on who will be leading the two provinces. The position was issued on September 28, 2022, where the election body concluded that only the Department of the Interior and Local Government could appoint the first officials of the province. The organic act presupposes that the plebiscite was held after the 2022 local elections; however, due to COMELEC's preparation for that, the plebiscite was done after it. Chairman George Garcia said that COMELEC will not participate in determining who would be the new officials, saying that under the Local Government Code, it would be the Department of the Interior and Local Government (DILG).

=== Leadership crises ===
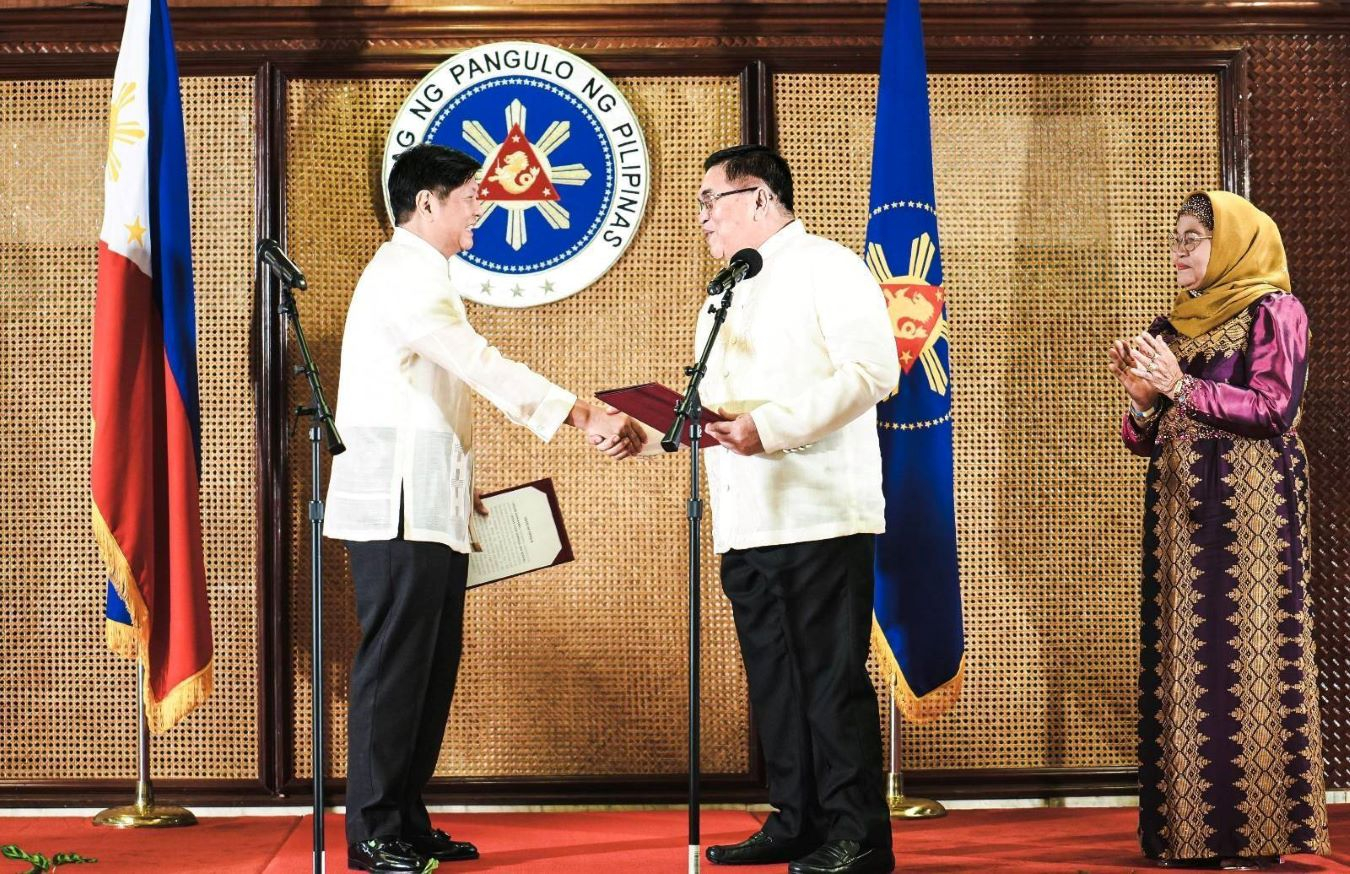
President Bongbong Marcos administering the oathtaking of Abdulraof Macacua as Maguindanao del Sur governor in April 2023

Leadership crises over the two provinces arose due to the complications of postponing the plebiscite. Former Maguindanao governor Mariam Mangudadatu unilaterally assumed the position of governor of Maguindanao del Sur, while her former vice governor, Ainee Sinsuat, assumed office as governor of Maguindanao del Norte in October 2022. The initial set of officials for the two new provinces would take the oath on October 13, 2022. However, the Bangsamoro regional government refused to recognized the officials, taking note the "legal controversy" arising from postponing the plebiscite.

Provision on the interim officials of Maguindanao del Norte

Officials of the Newly Created Provinces. - (a) The elective officials of the newly created provinces shall be elected on the second Monday of May 2022 national and local elections: Provided, That if this Act is approved and ratified within six (6) months or more prior to the 2022 national and local elections, the vice governor (Note: Ainee Sinsuat) and the next ranking elective member of the sangguniang panlalawigan of the present Province of Maguindanao, who are residents of the new Maguindanao del Norte shall assume as its acting governor and acting vice governor, respectively, and both shall continue to serve in office until their successors shall have been elected and qualified in the 2022 national and local elections.

— Section 50, Article IX: Transitory and Final Provisions, Republic Act No. 11550 (2021)

Provision on the interim officials of Maguindanao del Sur

The incumbent governor of the present Province of Maguindanao (Note: Mariam Mangudadatu) shall remain as governor of the Province of Maguindanao del Sur.

— Section 50d, Article IX: Transitory and Final Provisions, Republic Act No. 11550 (2021)

On January 9, 2023, a final ceremony for the old Maguindanao was held at the capitol grounds in Buluan, Maguindanao del Sur, marking as well the end of a 60-day transition period for the two new provincial governments. Separate official sessions and work later began.

On April 5, 2023, President Bongbong Marcos appointed his own Officer in Charge (OIC) officials in the two provinces.

==== Maguindanao del Norte ====
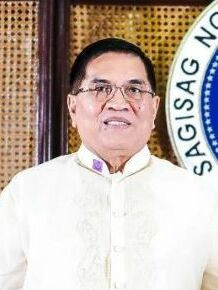
Ainee Sinsuat and Abdulraof Macacua

Ainee Sinsuat on October 13, 2022 assumed the position of acting governor of Maguindanao del Norte citing the province charter. Sharifudin Mastura is her acting vice governor.

On April 5, 2023, President Bongbong Marcos appointed Abdulraof Macacua as the Officer in Charge (OIC) governor of the province. Sinsuat, who had presumably assumed the role of acting governor, would be named as OIC vice governor.

On April 28, 2023, President Bongbong Marcos reappointed Macacua as the full pledged governor of the Maguindanao del Norte together with other officials of the provincial government. Mariam Mangudadatu would oppose Macacua's appointment until May 3, 2023.

On August 14, 2023, Sinsuat vacated her position as vice governor and revived her claim as the legitimate acting governor of Maguindanao del Norte, once again citing a June Supreme Court ruling. Shariffudin Mastura also reassumed the position of acting vice governor. The Bangsamoro regional government did not recognize Sinsuat's claim.

==== Maguindanao del Sur ====
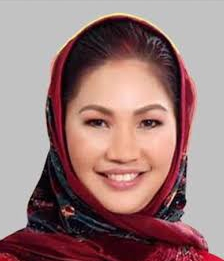
Mariam Mangudadatu

On October 13, 2022, Mariam Mangudadatu assumed the position of Maguindanao del Sur acting governor as per the provincial charter. Nathaniel Midtimbang was her acting vice governor.

Mangudadatu would be affirmed as governor of the province on April 5, 2023, when President Bongbong Marcos named her as Officer in Charge (OIC) of the province. Midtimbang likewise was named OIC vice governor. However, she would oppose the appointment as OIC, believing she already has mandate to be acting governor as per the province's charter law.

However, Mangudadatu took oath as OIC of the province on April 28, 2023, ending the leadership crisis in Maguindanao del Norte.

==== Summary ====
| Date | Maguindanao del Norte | | Maguindanao del Sur | | Notes |
| Date | Governor | Vice Governor | Governor | Vice Governor | Notes |
|---|---|---|---|---|---|
| September 17, 2022 – October 13, 2022 | Vacant | | | | |
| October 13, 2022 – April 5, 2023 | Ainee Sinsuat (unrecognized) | Sharifudin Mastura (unrecognized) | Mariam Mangudadatu (unrecognized) | Nathaniel Midtimbang (unrecognized) | Officials unilaterally assumed position; Unrecognized by the Philippine national and Bangsamoro regional government. |
| April 5, 2023 – June 30, 2025 | Abdulraof Macacua (recognized) | Ainee Sinsuat (until August 14, 2023); Vacant (from August 14, 2023) | Mariam Mangudadatu | Nathaniel Midtimbang | Appointees by President Bongbong Marcos. Mariam Mangudadatu disputes her status as Officer in Charge until April 28, 2023 |
| April 5, 2023 – June 30, 2025 | Ainee Sinsuat (claims to be Acting; from August 14, 2023) | Sharifudin Mastura (claims to be Acting; from August 14, 2023 | Mariam Mangudadatu | Nathaniel Midtimbang | Ainee Sinsuat from August 14, 2023 claims to be acting governor. |

== See also ==
- 2001 Zamboanga Sibugay creation plebiscite, which created the province of Zamboanga Sibugay out of Zamboanga del Sur
- 2006 Dinagat Islands creation plebiscite, which created the province of Dinagat Islands out of Surigao del Norte
- 2013 Davao Occidental creation plebiscite, which created the province of Davao Occidental out of Davao del Sur
