= 2022 Philippine local elections in Soccsksargen =

- May 9, 2022
- Gubernatorial elections
- 4 provincial governors and 1 city mayor
Party	Seats	+/–
PCM	2	+1
Lakas	1	New
Nacionalista	1	+1
PFP	1	0
This lists parties that won seats. See the complete results below.
- Vice gubernatorial elections
- 4 provincial vice governors and 1 city vice mayor
Party	Seats	+/–
PDP–Laban	2	0
Lakas	1	New
PCM	1	0
PFP	1	New
This lists parties that won seats. See the complete results below.
- Provincial Board elections
- 40 provincial board members and 12 city councilors
Party	Seats	+/–
PCM	13	−5
Lakas	11	New
PDP–Laban	10	−6
PFP	8	+7
Nacionalista	7	−1
AIM	2	−1
RCRI	1	New
This lists parties that won seats. See the complete results below.

The 2022 Philippine local elections in Soccsksargen were held on May 9, 2022.

== Summary ==
=== Governors ===
Province/city	Incumbent	Incumbent's party	Winner	Winner's party	Winning margin
Cotabato	Nancy Catamco	PDP–Laban	Emmylou Mendoza	Nacionalista	2.36%
General Santos (HUC)	Ronnel Rivera	Nacionalista	Lorelie Pacquiao	PCM	6.92%
Sarangani	Steve Solon	PCM	Rogelio Pacquiao	PCM	50.18%
South Cotabato	Reynaldo Tamayo Jr.	PFP	Reynaldo Tamayo Jr.	PFP	5.01%
Sultan Kudarat	Suharto Mangudadatu	NUP	Pax Ali Mangudadatu	Lakas	50.32%

=== Vice governors ===
Province/city	Incumbent	Incumbent's party	Winner	Winner's party	Winning margin
Cotabato	Emmylou Mendoza	Nacionalista	Efren Piñol	PDP–Laban	7.62%
General Santos (HUC)	Loreto Acharon	NPC	Lita Nuñez	PDP–Laban	4.85%
Sarangani	Elmer de Peralta	PCM	Elmer de Peralta	PCM	46.52%
South Cotabato	Arthur Pingoy Jr.	PFP	Arthur Pingoy Jr.	PFP	18.88%
Sultan Kudarat	Jose Remos Segura	Lakas	Raden Sakaluran	Lakas	44.30%

=== Provincial boards ===
Province/city	Seats	Party control		Composition
Province/city	Seats	Previous	Result	Composition
Cotabato	10 elected 4 ex-officio	No majority	No majority	Nacionalista (6); PDP–Laban (3); Lakas (1)
General Santos (HUC)	12 elected 3 ex-officio	PCM	No majority	PDP–Laban (5); PCM (3); AIM (2); RCRI (1); Nacionalista (1)
Sarangani	10 elected 4 ex-officio	PCM	PCM	PCM (10)
South Cotabato	10 elected 4 ex-officio	No majority	PFP	PFP (8); PDP–Laban (2)
Sultan Kudarat	10 elected 3 ex-officio	PDP–Laban	Lakas	Lakas (10)

== Cotabato ==
=== Governor ===
Incumbent Governor Nancy Catamco of PDP–Laban ran for a second term.

Catamco was defeated by Cotabato vice governor Emmylou Mendoza of the Nacionalista Party. Two other candidates also ran for governor.

Candidate	Party	Votes	%
Emmylou Taliño-Mendoza	Nacionalista Party	310,681	50.95
Nancy Catamco (incumbent)	PDP–Laban	296,330	48.59
Rex Maongko	Independent	1,618	0.27
Manuel Adajar	Independent	1,195	0.20
Total		609,824	100.00
Total votes		646,944	–
Registered voters/turnout		771,206	83.89
Nacionalista gain from PDP–Laban			
Source: Commission on Elections

=== Vice Governor ===
Incumbent Vice Governor Emmylou Mendoza of the Nacionalista Party ran for governor of Cotabato.

Mendoza endorsed provincial board member Shirlyn Macasarte of Lakas–CMD, who was defeated by Cotabato administrator Efren Piñol of PDP–Laban. Two other candidates also ran for vice governor.

Candidate	Party	Votes	%
Efren Piñol	PDP–Laban	295,951	52.93
Shirlyn Macasarte	Lakas–CMD	253,306	45.31
Arman Macapendeg	Independent	8,245	1.47
Hyner Descalso	Independent	1,609	0.29
Total		559,111	100.00
Total votes		646,944	–
Registered voters/turnout		771,206	83.89
Nacionalista gain from PDP–Laban			
Source: Commission on Elections

=== Provincial Board ===
The Cotabato Provincial Board is composed of 14 board members, 10 of whom are elected.

The Nacionalista Party won six seats, remaining as the largest party in the provincial board.

Party	Votes	%	Seats	+/–
PDP–Laban	697,613	45.34	3	0
Nacionalista Party	647,726	42.10	6	–1
Lakas–CMD	92,942	6.04	1	New
PROMDI	15,109	0.98	0	New
Kilusang Bagong Lipunan	4,083	0.27	0	New
Aksyon Demokratiko	3,986	0.26	0	New
Independent	77,072	5.01	0	0
Total	1,538,531	100.00	10	0
Total votes	646,944	–		
Registered voters/turnout	771,206	83.89		

==== 1st district ====
Cotabato's 1st provincial district consists of the same area as Cotabato's 1st legislative district. Four board members are elected from this provincial district.

16 candidates were included in the ballot.

Candidate	Party	Votes	%
Edwin Cruzado	PDP–Laban	89,379	15.81
Manuel Rabara	PDP–Laban	75,668	13.38
Sittie Eljorie Antao	Nacionalista Party	70,415	12.45
Roland Jungco (incumbent)	Nacionalista Party	67,652	11.97
James Llaban Jr.	PDP–Laban	63,141	11.17
Rose Cabaya (incumbent)	Nacionalista Party	61,928	10.95
Dulia Sultan	PDP–Laban	58,814	10.40
Alan Ry Monstrales	Independent	36,420	6.44
Benny Queman	PROMDI	15,109	2.67
Nonoy Roquero	Independent	10,730	1.90
Araphat Lagasan	Aksyon Demokratiko	3,986	0.71
Abdulkadil Kamad	Independent	3,536	0.63
Norodin Mangulamas	Independent	3,400	0.60
Lina Andie	Independent	2,082	0.37
Datunasser Unggad	Independent	1,688	0.30
John Buat	Independent	1,418	0.25
Total		565,366	100.00
Total votes		196,181	–
Registered voters/turnout		231,247	84.84
Source: Commission on Elections

==== 2nd district ====
Cotabato's 2nd provincial district consists of the same area as Cotabato's 2nd legislative district. Three board members are elected from this provincial district.

Eight candidates were included in the ballot.

Candidate	Party	Votes	%
Joseph Evangelista	Nacionalista Party	102,787	20.88
RJ Caoagdan	Nacionalista Party	95,362	19.37
Kris Piñol-Solis (incumbent)	PDP–Laban	91,721	18.63
Phil Malaluan (incumbent)	PDP–Laban	91,249	18.54
Noel Baynosa	Nacionalista Party	61,697	12.53
Jun Obello	PDP–Laban	43,267	8.79
Joenard Palma	Kilusang Bagong Lipunan	4,083	0.83
Marney Mangundala	Independent	2,092	0.42
Total		492,258	100.00
Total votes		228,103	–
Registered voters/turnout		269,283	84.71
Source: Commission on Elections

==== 3rd district ====
Cotabato's 3rd provincial district consists of the same area as Cotabato's 3rd legislative district. Three board members are elected from this provincial district.

Nine candidates were included in the ballot.

Candidate	Party	Votes	%
Ivy Dalumpines (incumbent)	Nacionalista Party	97,168	20.21
Jonathan Tabara (incumbent)	Lakas–CMD	92,942	19.33
Kano Cerebo (incumbent)	Nacionalista Party	90,717	18.86
Rick Benito	PDP–Laban	85,249	17.73
Gadi Sorilla	PDP–Laban	55,151	11.47
Connie Dumato	PDP–Laban	43,974	9.14
Julius Valmores	Independent	6,986	1.45
Bhai Matucan	Independent	4,433	0.92
Zatar Guintawan	Independent	4,287	0.89
Total		480,907	100.00
Total votes		222,660	–
Registered voters/turnout		270,676	82.26
Source: Commission on Elections

== General Santos ==
=== Mayor ===
Term-limited incumbent Mayor Ronnel Rivera of the Nacionalista Party ran for the House of Representatives in General Santos' lone legislative district.

General Santos Liga ng mga Barangay president Lorelie Pacquiao (People's Champ Movement) won the election against South Cotabato's 1st district representative Shirlyn Bañas-Nograles (PDP–Laban), Brigada Group founder Elmer Catulpos (Achievers with Integrity Movement) and two other candidates.

Candidate	Party	Votes	%
Lorelie Pacquiao	People's Champ Movement	104,244	39.24
Shirlyn Bañas-Nograles	PDP–Laban	85,869	32.32
Elmer Catulpos	Achievers with Integrity Movement	72,626	27.34
Roberto Perales	Independent	2,303	0.87
Sterling Sañado	Independent	630	0.24
Total		265,672	100.00
Total votes		276,919	–
Registered voters/turnout		360,232	76.87
PCM gain from Nacionalista			
Source: Commission on Elections

=== Vice Mayor ===
Incumbent Vice Mayor Loreto Acharon of the Nationalist People's Coalition ran for the House of Representatives in General Santos' lone legislative district.

City councilor Lita Nuñez (PDP–Laban) won the election against Art Cloma (Achievers with Integrity Movement) and city councilor Jeng Gacal (People's Champ Movement).

Candidate	Party	Votes	%
Lita Nuñez	PDP–Laban	90,403	37.03
Art Cloma	Achievers with Integrity Movement	78,573	32.18
Jeng Gacal (incumbent)	People's Champ Movement	75,169	30.79
Total		244,145	100.00
Total votes		276,919	–
Registered voters/turnout		360,232	76.87
PDP–Laban gain from NPC			
Source: Commission on Elections

=== City Council ===
The General Santos City Council is composed of 15 councilors, 12 of whom are elected.

48 candidates were included in the ballot.

PDP–Laban won five seats, becoming the largest party in the city council.

Party	Votes	%	Seats	+/–
People's Champ Movement	806,728	32.01	3	–5
PDP–Laban	763,244	30.29	5	New
Achievers with Integrity Movement	650,587	25.82	2	–1
Regional Communities Reforms Initiatives	98,616	3.91	1	New
Nacionalista Party	84,391	3.35	1	0
Pederalismo ng Dugong Dakilang Samahan	27,034	1.07	0	New
Aksyon Demokratiko	8,184	0.32	0	New
Independent	81,342	3.23	0	0
Total	2,520,126	100.00	12	0
Total votes	276,919	–		
Registered voters/turnout	360,232	76.87		

Candidate	Party	Votes	%
Odjok Acharon (incumbent)	People's Champ Movement	124,726	4.95
Jose Edmar Yumang (incumbent)	Regional Communities Reforms Initiatives	98,616	3.91
Dominador Lagare Jr. (incumbent)	People's Champ Movement	96,680	3.84
Lulu Casabuena (incumbent)	PDP–Laban	93,623	3.72
Van-van Congson (incumbent)	PDP–Laban	92,440	3.67
Elizabeth Bagonoc	PDP–Laban	90,465	3.59
Richard Atendido (incumbent)	People's Champ Movement	86,692	3.44
Jonathan Blando (incumbent)	Nacionalista Party	84,391	3.35
Kan Balleque	Achievers with Integrity Movement	84,162	3.34
Virgie Llido	Achievers with Integrity Movement	82,963	3.29
Jane Rivera	PDP–Laban	82,214	3.26
Edgar Acharon	PDP–Laban	81,767	3.24
Joel Duterte	PDP–Laban	71,134	2.82
Ramon Melliza	PDP–Laban	68,607	2.72
Bing Dinopol (incumbent)	PDP–Laban	68,366	2.71
Boyet Leyson	People's Champ Movement	65,270	2.59
Mac Tablazon	PDP–Laban	64,135	2.54
Dyll Bartolaba	Achievers with Integrity Movement	63,250	2.51
Pao Natividad	People's Champ Movement	62,628	2.49
Remus de Claro	People's Champ Movement	61,075	2.42
Jong Gonzalez	People's Champ Movement	60,409	2.40
Joey Dinopol	People's Champ Movement	59,668	2.37
Mike Tanzo	Achievers with Integrity Movement	56,421	2.24
Benjamin Pagarigan Jr.	Achievers with Integrity Movement	54,887	2.18
Jocelyn Cadeliña	People's Champ Movement	54,836	2.18
Jake Reyes	People's Champ Movement	54,779	2.17
Jun Avila	Achievers with Integrity Movement	53,585	2.13
Marilou Tan	PDP–Laban	50,493	2.00
George Anas Jr.	Achievers with Integrity Movement	49,966	1.98
Joseph Arnold Calonzo	People's Champ Movement	47,375	1.88
Becky Magante	Achievers with Integrity Movement	47,178	1.87
Dino Barrientos	Achievers with Integrity Movement	41,363	1.64
Jay Berame	Achievers with Integrity Movement	41,050	1.63
Thirdy Santander	Achievers with Integrity Movement	38,409	1.52
Abel Sosobrado	Achievers with Integrity Movement	37,353	1.48
Abet Pestaño	People's Champ Movement	32,590	1.29
Ed Leyson	Pederalismo ng Dugong Dakilang Samahan	16,270	0.65
Jover Pontino	Independent	15,256	0.61
Bench Rivera	Independent	14,705	0.58
Belinda Canlas	Independent	12,964	0.51
Norman Yap	Independent	12,294	0.49
Wenceslao Tupas	Pederalismo ng Dugong Dakilang Samahan	10,764	0.43
Val Lastimoso	Independent	10,751	0.43
Joman Rotone	Aksyon Demokratiko	8,184	0.32
Neri Clam	Independent	4,565	0.18
Alfredo Poloyapoy	Independent	3,944	0.16
Roberto Dosejo	Independent	3,538	0.14
Robert Gilbuina	Independent	3,325	0.13
Total		2,520,126	100.00
Total votes		276,919	–
Registered voters/turnout		360,232	76.87
Source: Commission on Elections

== Sarangani ==
=== Governor ===
Term-limited incumbent Governor Steve Solon of the People's Champ Movement (PCM) ran for the House of Representatives in Sarangani's lone legislative district.

The PCM nominated representative Rogelio Pacquiao, who won the election against two other candidates.

Candidate	Party	Votes	%
Rogelio Pacquiao	People's Champ Movement	166,249	73.42
Bong Aquia	Aksyon Demokratiko	52,634	23.24
Gladden Lim	Independent	7,564	3.34
Total		226,447	100.00
Total votes		278,672	–
Registered voters/turnout		362,055	76.97
PCM hold			
Source: Commission on Elections

=== Vice Governor ===
Incumbent Vice Governor Elmer de Peralta of the People's Champ Movement ran for a third term.

De Peralta won re-election against Elanor Saguiguit (Aksyon Demokratiko).

Candidate	Party	Votes	%
Elmer de Peralta (incumbent)	People's Champ Movement	146,068	73.26
Elanor Saguiguit	Aksyon Demokratiko	53,309	26.74
Total		199,377	100.00
Total votes		278,672	–
Registered voters/turnout		362,055	76.97
PCM hold			
Source: Commission on Elections

=== Provincial Board ===
The Sarangani Provincial Board is composed of 14 board members, 10 of whom are elected.

The People's Champ Movement won 10 seats, maintaining its majority in the provincial board.

Party	Votes	%	Seats	+/–
People's Champ Movement	567,505	70.61	10	0
Aksyon Demokratiko	127,772	15.90	0	New
Partido Pederal ng Maharlika	42,356	5.27	0	New
Partido Federal ng Pilipinas	13,552	1.69	0	0
Independent	52,510	6.53	0	0
Total	803,695	100.00	10	0
Total votes	278,672	–		
Registered voters/turnout	362,055	76.97		

==== 1st district ====
Sarangani's 1st provincial district consists of the municipalities of Kiamba, Maasim and Maitum. Four board members are elected from this provincial district.

12 candidates were included in the ballot.

Candidate	Party	Votes	%
Russell Jamora (incumbent)	People's Champ Movement	38,816	17.57
Jess Bascuña (incumbent)	People's Champ Movement	33,789	15.29
Arnold Abequibel	People's Champ Movement	31,982	14.48
Rosemarie Sayo (incumbent)	People's Champ Movement	31,737	14.36
Roy Abdul	Independent	24,137	10.92
Bebing Mantua	Aksyon Demokratiko	15,189	6.87
Ping Ibrahim	Partido Federal ng Pilipinas	13,552	6.13
Manuel Chua	Aksyon Demokratiko	8,209	3.72
Vigor Borris	Independent	7,396	3.35
Solaiman Kamad	Partido Pederal ng Maharlika	6,576	2.98
Dexter Rojas	Aksyon Demokratiko	6,300	2.85
Alemudin Dimatingkal	Partido Pederal ng Maharlika	3,262	1.48
Total		220,945	100.00
Total votes		89,178	–
Registered voters/turnout		110,886	80.42
Source: Commission on Elections

==== 2nd district ====
Sarangani's 2nd provincial district consists of the municipalities of Alabel, Glan, Malapatan and Malungon. Six board members are elected from this provincial district.

15 candidates were included in the ballot.

Candidate	Party	Votes	%
Irish Arnado (incumbent)	People's Champ Movement	79,973	13.72
Ephraim Galzote (incumbent)	People's Champ Movement	75,187	12.90
Joseph Calanao (incumbent)	People's Champ Movement	73,154	12.55
Gwynn Singcoy	People's Champ Movement	68,825	11.81
Jose Tranquilino Ruiz (incumbent)	People's Champ Movement	67,250	11.54
Corazon Grafilo (incumbent)	People's Champ Movement	66,792	11.46
Jorge Liansing Jr.	Partido Pederal ng Maharlika	24,562	4.21
Abdulracman Pangolima	Independent	20,977	3.60
Bobby Saya-Ang	Aksyon Demokratiko	17,732	3.04
Thong Pangolima	Aksyon Demokratiko	17,638	3.03
Bogs Olarte	Aksyon Demokratiko	17,352	2.98
Toto Beldad	Aksyon Demokratiko	16,722	2.87
Dindi Belimac	Aksyon Demokratiko	15,504	2.66
Pastor Bomes	Aksyon Demokratiko	13,126	2.25
Jennie Barredo	Partido Pederal ng Maharlika	7,956	1.37
Total		582,750	100.00
Total votes		189,494	–
Registered voters/turnout		251,169	75.44
Source: Commission on Elections

== South Cotabato ==
=== Governor ===
Incumbent Governor Reynaldo Tamayo Jr. of the Partido Federal ng Pilipinas ran for a second term.

Tamayo won re-election against former representative Ferdinand Hernandez (PDP–Laban) and Ramir Badayos (Independent).

Candidate	Party	Votes	%
Reynaldo Tamayo Jr. (incumbent)	Partido Federal ng Pilipinas	253,944	52.32
Ferdinand Hernandez	PDP–Laban	229,628	47.31
Ramir Badayos	Independent	1,809	0.37
Total		485,381	100.00
Total votes		510,050	–
Registered voters/turnout		615,309	82.89
PFP hold			
Source: Commission on Elections

=== Vice Governor ===
Incumbent Vice Governor Vicente de Jesus of PDP–Laban ran for a third term.

De Jesus was defeated by former South Cotabato governor Arthur Pingoy Jr. of the Partido Federal ng Pilipinas.

Candidate	Party	Votes	%
Arthur Pingoy Jr.	Partido Federal ng Pilipinas	253,780	59.44
Vicente de Jesus (incumbent)	PDP–Laban	173,157	40.56
Total		426,937	100.00
Total votes		510,050	–
Registered voters/turnout		615,309	82.89
PFP gain from PDP–Laban			
Source: Commission on Elections

=== Provincial Board ===
The South Cotabato Provincial Board consists of 14 board members, 10 of whom are elected.

The Partido Federal ng Pilipinas won eight seats, gaining a majority in the provincial board.

Party	Votes	%	Seats	+/–
Partido Federal ng Pilipinas	1,093,482	54.58	8	+7
PDP–Laban	759,789	37.92	2	–2
Laban ng Demokratikong Pilipino	97,477	4.87	0	New
Independent	52,781	2.63	0	0
Total	2,003,529	100.00	10	0
Total votes	510,050	–		
Registered voters/turnout	615,309	82.89		

==== 1st district ====
South Cotabato's 1st provincial district consists of the same area as South Cotabato's 1st legislative district. Three board members are elected from this provincial district.

Six candidates were included in the ballot.

Candidate	Party	Votes	%
Nilda Almencion	Partido Federal ng Pilipinas	75,107	22.21
Noel Escobillo (incumbent)	Partido Federal ng Pilipinas	67,068	19.84
Alan Ines	PDP–Laban	60,495	17.89
Bonbon Barroso	Partido Federal ng Pilipinas	56,949	16.84
Ireneo Cabahug	PDP–Laban	49,124	14.53
Diomedes Madanguit Sr.	Laban ng Demokratikong Pilipino	29,351	8.68
Total		338,094	100.00
Total votes		155,884	–
Registered voters/turnout		193,558	80.54
Source: Commission on Elections

==== 2nd district ====
South Cotabato's 2nd provincial district consists of the same area as South Cotabato's 2nd legislative district. Six board members are elected from this provincial district.

19 candidates were included in the ballot.

Candidate	Party	Votes	%
Junette Ines Hurtado	Partido Federal ng Pilipinas	152,798	9.17
Dardanilo Dar (incumbent)	PDP–Laban	134,185	8.06
Ervin Luntao	Partido Federal ng Pilipinas	133,717	8.03
Mike Matinong	Partido Federal ng Pilipinas	132,395	7.95
Lyndale Causing	Partido Federal ng Pilipinas	126,407	7.59
Henry Ladot (incumbent)	Partido Federal ng Pilipinas	126,016	7.57
Inday Diel	Partido Federal ng Pilipinas	122,144	7.33
Jinky Avance (incumbent)	PDP–Laban	118,470	7.11
Hilario de Pedro VI (incumbent)	PDP–Laban	117,468	7.05
Grace Achurra	PDP–Laban	102,860	6.18
Rogelio Cadellino	Partido Federal ng Pilipinas	100,881	6.06
RJ Sustiguer	PDP–Laban	99,797	5.99
Christy Joy Sollesta	PDP–Laban	77,390	4.65
Magno Reyes Jr.	Laban ng Demokratikong Pilipino	68,126	4.09
Romelito Fado	Independent	18,412	1.11
Teresito Betita	Independent	9,761	0.59
Ansary Comayog	Independent	9,696	0.58
Ramil Biare	Independent	9,428	0.57
Lino Saig	Independent	5,484	0.33
Total		1,665,435	100.00
Total votes		354,166	–
Registered voters/turnout		421,751	83.98
Source: Commission on Elections

== Sultan Kudarat ==
=== Governor ===
Incumbent Governor Suharto Mangudadatu of the National Unity Party retired.

Mangudadatu endorsed his son, Datu Abdullah Sangki, Maguindanao mayor Pax Ali Mangudadatu (Lakas–CMD), who won the election against Sharifa Akeel (Aksyon Demokratiko). On May 2, 2022, the Commission on Elections en banc upheld its First Division's resolution to disqualify Pax Ali over a residency issue. However, the Supreme Court allowed Pax Ali's candidacy through a temporary restraining order.

Candidate	Party	Votes	%
Pax Ali Mangudadatu	Lakas–CMD	262,854	75.16
Sharifa Akeel	Aksyon Demokratiko	86,868	24.84
Total		349,722	100.00
Total votes		389,908	–
Registered voters/turnout		497,690	78.34
Lakas gain from NUP			
Source: Commission on Elections

=== Vice Governor ===
Incumbent Vice Governor Jose Remos Segura of Lakas–CMD ran for the Sultan Kudarat Provincial Board in the 1st provincial district. Previously affiliated with PDP–Laban, he became vice governor on November 30, 2019, after Ramon Abalos died.

Lakas–CMD nominated former representative Raden Sakaluran, who won the election against Dave Salazar (Aksyon Demokratiko).

Candidate	Party	Votes	%
Raden Sakaluran	Lakas–CMD	228,254	72.15
Dave Salazar	Aksyon Demokratiko	88,120	27.85
Total		316,374	100.00
Total votes		389,908	–
Registered voters/turnout		497,690	78.34
Lakas gain from NUP			
Source: Commission on Elections

=== Provincial Board ===
The Sultan Kudarat Provincial Board is composed of 13 board members, 10 of whom are elected.

Lakas–CMD won 10 seats, gaining a majority in the provincial board.

Party	Votes	%	Seats	+/–
Lakas–CMD	863,420	73.72	10	New
Aksyon Demokratiko	234,996	20.06	0	New
Independent	72,808	6.22	0	–1
Total	1,171,224	100.00	10	0
Total votes	389,908	–		
Registered voters/turnout	497,690	78.34		
Source: Commission on Elections

==== 1st district ====
Sultan Kudarat's 1st provincial district consists of the same area as Sultan Kudarat's 1st legislative district. Five board members are elected from this provincial district.

Ten candidates were included in the ballot.

Candidate	Party	Votes	%
Ian Jordan Abalos	Lakas–CMD	112,088	16.54
Jose Remos Segura	Lakas–CMD	110,720	16.34
Jovita Duque (incumbent)	Lakas–CMD	101,603	14.99
Ernesto Matias (incumbent)	Lakas–CMD	98,440	14.52
Alfonso Demasuay (incumbent)	Lakas–CMD	91,232	13.46
Jessa Bermudez	Aksyon Demokratiko	49,277	7.27
Joselito Cajandig	Aksyon Demokratiko	35,749	5.27
Rodrigo Tomboc Jr.	Aksyon Demokratiko	31,295	4.62
Owa Juan	Aksyon Demokratiko	25,630	3.78
Hernando Foscablo	Aksyon Demokratiko	21,757	3.21
Total		677,791	100.00
Total votes		201,873	–
Registered voters/turnout		250,786	80.50
Source: Commission on Elections

==== 2nd district ====
Sultan Kudarat's 2nd provincial district consists of the same area as Sultan Kudarat's 2nd legislative district. Five board members are elected from this provincial district.

Nine candidates were included in the ballot.

Candidate	Party	Votes	%
Lita Latog	Lakas–CMD	74,670	14.95
Glecy Fornan (incumbent)	Lakas–CMD	73,040	14.62
Maria Loida de Manuel	Lakas–CMD	70,023	14.02
Soriel Lib-atin	Lakas–CMD	69,743	13.96
Amil Pangansayan	Lakas–CMD	61,861	12.39
Soysoy Gumana	Independent	46,232	9.26
Zahara Maulana	Aksyon Demokratiko	37,748	7.56
Rene Apolinario	Aksyon Demokratiko	33,540	6.72
Antonio Morales	Independent	32,576	6.52
Total		499,433	100.00
Total votes		188,035	–
Registered voters/turnout		246,904	76.16
Source: Commission on Elections
