= Ali Midtimbang =

Filipino politician

Governor of Maguindanao del Sur
- Incumbent
- Assumed office June 30, 2025
- Vice Governor: Hisham Nando
- Preceded by: Mariam Mangudadatu

Personal details
- Born: Ali Musa Midtimbang; November 10, 1949 (age 76)
- Party: United Bangsamoro Justice Party
- Occupation: Politician

Ali Musa Midtimbang is a Filipino politician who is governor of Maguindanao del Sur.

== Early life ==
Ali Musa Midtimbang was born on November 10, 1949.

== Career ==
Midtimbang was a former mayor of Talayan when the town was still part of an undivided Maguindanao province.

He was a candidate in the 2016 elections, running for governor of Maguindanao.

Midtimbang ran under the United Bangsamoro Justice Party for the position of governor of Maguindanao del Sur in the 2025 election. He defeated acting governor Mariam Mangudadatu, becoming the first elected governor of the province.

== Personal life ==
Midtimbang is married to Eliambal S. Madtimbang. His son, Nathaniel Midtimbang was interim vice governor of Maguindanao del Sur and a former vice mayor of Datu Anggal Midtimbang.

The father-son survived a grenade attack in 2017.
