= Arabs in the Philippines =

Total population
- Estimated 2% of population have partial Arab ancestry

Regions with significant populations
- Mindanao · Metro Manila · Visayas

Languages
- Arabic · Filipino · Philippine English · other languages of the Philippines

Religion
- Sunni Islam · Greek Orthodox Christianity · Catholicism · Others

Related ethnic groups
- Arab diaspora

Arab traders have been visiting the Philippines for centuries, playing a prominent role in the trade networks of the time. They used Southeast Asia for stopovers and trading posts. Arab merchants began establishing settlements in the southern Philippines around the 13th century. Since the 14th century, Arab travelers such as Makhdun Karim are known to have reached the Philippines and brought Islam to the region. They moved from the southern islands such as Mindanao and traveled towards the north and converted the Filipinos to Islam, many of these early Arabs married Filipina women.

An estimated 2% of the population of the Philippines, about 2.2 million people, could claim partial Arab ancestry.

== History ==
Muslim Arab merchants increasingly traveled via Southeast Asian trade routes, including through the southern Philippines by the 10th century. Around the 13th and 14th centuries, foreign (including Arab) merchants had formed settlements in the area. By the 14th century Arab travelers had traded extensively with local chiefs, datos and rajahs. During the advent of Islam into Southeast Asia, Makhdum Karim, the first Islamic missionary to reach the Sulu Archipelago, brought Islam to what is now the Philippines, first arriving in Tawi-Tawi.

Arab and Persian traders passed by the Philippines, on their way to Guangzhou, China. Subsequent visits of Arab Muslim missionaries strengthened the Islamic faith in the Philippines, concentrating in the south and reaching as far north as Manila. According to the Syrian Consulate in Makati, the first Orthodox Christians on the islands were Syrian and Lebanese merchants and sailors, who arrived in Manila after the city was opened to international trade.

Political and economic relations were enhanced in the 1970s between the Philippines and Arab nations, this was during the period of oil shocks and political instability in the Middle East. This led to closer collaboration between the countries and led to an increase in Philippine laborers working in the Middle East.

In recent times, another wave of Arabs to arrive in the Philippines were refugees from war-torn nations, such as Lebanon (undergoing civil war in the 1980s) and Arab other nations involved in the Gulf War in 1991. While other Arabs were entrepreneurs who intend to set up businesses. Filipinos with Arab descent live primarily in Mindanao, while the more recent immigrants live in Manila.

== Cesar Majul ==
Filipino author Cesar Adib Majul, the son of a Greek Orthodox Christian immigrant from Syria, converted to Islam in his late adulthood. He became a prominent historian on the Muslim Moro people and the history of Islam in the Philippines and wrote many books about Moros and Islam.

== Notable people ==
=== Movie and TV celebrities ===
- Charlie Davao, actor (Jordanian from maternal grandmother's side)
- Dawn Zulueta, actress (Palestinian from maternal grandfather's side),
- Kuh Ledesma, singer and actress (born to a Filipino father and a Lebanese mother)
- Monsour del Rosario, Filipino actor, martial artist, businessman and taekwondo champion (born to a Filipino father and a Lebanese mother
- Ana Roces, Filipino actress of Spanish and Lebanese descent
- Uma Khouny (Palestinian),
- Yasmien Kurdi, actress and singer (father is Lebanese-born of Kurdish descent)
- Jessy Mendiola, actress (half Lebanese half Filipina)
- Mona Louise Rey, actress and model (born to a Moroccan father and a Filipina Mother)
- Ivana Alawi, actress, model, and YouTuber (born to a Moroccan father and a Filipina Mother)

=== Historians ===
- Cesar Adib Majdul, historian (born to a Syrian father and a Filipina mother)

=== Beauty pageant titleholders ===
- Mary Jean Lastimosa, Filipina beauty queen, engineer, actress, host and TV presenter (born to a Saudi father and a Filipina mother)
- Zahra Bianca Saldua (real name: Zahra Bianca Saldua; Palestinian) – Miss Philippines Earth 2018 Miss Philippines Earth Air 2018 (1st Runner-Up)
- Sharifa Akeel (real name: Sharifa Mangatong Areef Mohammad Omar Akeel; Qatari) – Mutya ng Pilipinas 2018 Mutya ng Pilipinas Asia Pacific 2018 and Miss Asia Pacific International 2018 Winner and A Politician
- Naelah Alshorbaji, model and beauty pageant contestant who was crowned Miss Philippines Earth 2021 (born to a Syrian father and a Filipina mother)
- Gazini Ganados, model and beauty pageant titleholder and winner of Miss Universe Philippines 2019 and Miss Universe 2019 Top 20 semifinalist (born to a Palestinian father and a Filipina mother)

=== World War II guerrillas ===
- Maj. Khalil Khodr (Syrian) – Mining engineer in Agusan Province, regimental commander of 110th Division, 10th Military District of the US Forces in the Philippines (USFIP) guerrillas in Mindanao, naturalized as Filipino citizen by a Congressional Act in 1962.

=== YouTube personalities ===
- Zeinab Harake (Lebanese)
- The Hungry Syrian Wanderer (real name: Basel Manadil, Syrian)

== See also ==
- Arab diaspora
- Arab Christians
- Islam in the Philippines
- Philippine Orthodox Church
