= Governor of Maguindanao del Sur =

Local chief executive

- Punong Lalawigan ng Timog Maguindanao
- Seal of the Province of Maguindanao del Sur
- Incumbent; Ali Midtimbang since June 30, 2025
- Style: Honorable (formal); Mr./Madame Governor (informal)
- Term length: 3 years
- Inaugural holder: Bai Mariam Mangudadatu
- Formation: October 13, 2022

The governor of Maguindanao del Sur is the highest political office in the province of Maguindanao del Sur, Philippines.

== History ==
Following the 2022 Maguindanao division plebiscite of September 17, 2022, Maguindanao was split into Maguindanao del Sur and Maguindanao del Norte provinces. The charter legislation of the two provinces, Republic Act No. 11550, provides for acting governors for the newly formed subdivisions. Mariam Mangudadatu, the last governor of Maguindanao, was supposed to assume the position of governor of Maguindanao del Sur. However, this was uncertain, since the relevant provision which dictates the initial province officials presumes that the plebiscite would be held before the May 2022 national elections but the division vote was postponed after that date.

Mangudadatu would assume the position of governor of Maguindanao del Sur nevertheless, which was unrecognized by the Bangsamoro regional government.

Mangudadatu would be affirmed as governor of the province, when President Bongbong Marcos named her as Officer in Charge (OIC) of the province on April 5, 2023. Midtimbang likewise was named OIC vice governor. However she would oppose the appointment as OIC, believing she already has mandate to be acting governor as per the province's charter law. However, she took oath as OIC of the province on April 28, 2023.

== List of governors ==
| No. | Portrait | Governor Office (Note: Office before became/elected Governor.) (Lifespan) | Party | Term of office | | | Election | City/Municipality | Vice Governor | |
| No. | Portrait | Governor Office (Lifespan) | Party | start | end | duration | Election | City/Municipality | Vice Governor | |
|---|---|---|---|---|---|---|---|---|---|---|
| – | | Mariam Mangudadatu; Governor of Maguindanao (born 1973) | Nacionalista | 13 October 2022 (Note: Acting role. Self-appointed as per the province charter law. Unrecognized by national and Bangsamoro governments from October 13, 2022 to April 5, 2023.) (Note: As per the national government as OIC from April 5, 2023. OIC governor designation unrecognized by Mangudadatu's office until April 28, 2023.) | 30 June 2025 | 2 years, 260 days | — | Datu Abdullah Sangki | Nacionalista | Nathaniel S. Midtimbang (2022–2025) |
| 1 | | Ali Midtimbang; Mayor of Talayan (born 1949) | UBJP | 30 June 2025 | Incumbent | 1 year, 69 days | 2025 | Datu Anggal Midtimbang | UBJP | Hisham Nando (2025–Incumbent) |
