= Maguindanao del Sur's 1st parliamentary district =

Parliamentary district for the Bangsamoro Parliament

- Constituency for the Bangsamoro Parliament
- Boundary of Maguindanao del Sur's 1st parliamentary district in Maguindanao del Sur
- Province: Maguindanao del Sur
- Population: 180,592 (2024)
- Electorate: 97,496 (2026)

Current constituency
- Member of Parliament: Tawakal Midtimbang (elect)
- Political party: UBJP

Maguindanao del Sur's 1st parliamentary district is the first of the five parliamentary districts of the province of Maguindanao del Sur for the Bangsamoro Parliament. It is composed of the municipalities of Datu Anggal Midtimbang, Datu Hoffer Ampatuan, Guindulungan, South Upi, and Talayan.

Tawakal Midtimbang of the United Bangsamoro Justice Party is the member of Parliament-elect for the district following the inaugural 2026 Bangsamoro Parliament election. He will assume office on October 30, 2026.

== List of MPs representing the district ==
No.	Portrait	Member (Lifespan)	Term of office	Party	Parliament	Electoral history	Constituencies
1		Tawakal Midtimbang (born 1985)	Assuming office on October 30, 2026	UBJP	1st Parliament	Elected in 2026.	2026–present Datu Anggal Midtimbang, Datu Hoffer Ampatuan, Guindulungan, South Upi, Talayan

== Election results ==
=== 2026 ===
2026 Bangsamoro Parliament election in Maguindanao del Sur
Party	Candidate	Votes	%
UBJP	Tawakal Midtimbang	62,302	85.55
Al Ittihad–UKB	Bobby Midtimbang	9,697	13.31
Independent	Edres Kasim	433	0.59
BEST Party	Mohammad Hassan Usop	396	0.54
Total votes		72,828	100.00
UBJP win (new seat)			
