= Sharifa Akeel =

Filipino model (born 1997)

Sharifa Akeel-Mangudadatu
- Born: Sharifa Mangatong Areef Mohammad Omar Akeel; July 24, 1997 (age 29); Cotabato City, Philippines
- Education: Notre Dame of Salaman College
- Height: 1.73 m (5 ft 8 in)
- Spouse: Esmael Mangudadatu (m. 2021)
- Children: 2
- Beauty pageant titleholder
- Title: Mutya ng Pilipinas Asia Pacific International 2018; Miss Asia Pacific International 2018
- Hair color: Brown
- Eye color: Brown
- Major competitions: Mutya ng Pilipinas 2018 (Winner); Miss Asia Pacific International 2018 (Winner)

Personal details
- Party: PFP (2024–present)
- Other political affiliations: Aksyon Demokratiko (2021–2024)

Sharifa Mangatong Areef Mohammad Omar Akeel or Sharifa Akeel (born July 24, 1997) is a Filipino model who was crowned Miss Asia Pacific International 2018. Previously, she was crowned Mutya ng Pilipinas 2018.

She is the second wife of Maguindanao del Sur Representative Esmael Mangudadatu. In the 2022 and 2025 elections, she ran for governor of Sultan Kudarat, losing both times to Pax Ali Mangudadatu.

== Early life ==
Akeel was born in Lebak, Sultan Kudarat on July 24, 1997. She has a mixed blood of Qatari and Iranian from her paternal side and Maguindanao Filipino on her maternal side. She holds a degree of Bachelor in Elementary Education from the Notre Dame of Salaman College, where she also played softball, and formerly worked as Human Relations Officer at the Congressional office of the Province of Sultan Kudarat.

== Pageantry ==
=== Mutya ng Pilipinas 2018 ===
Akeel was selected as one of the fifty candidates of the Mutya ng Pilipinas 2018 held on September 16 at the SM Mall of Asia Arena in Pasay. She was crowned as Mutya ng Pilipinas – Asia Pacific International 2018 and represented the country on Miss Asia Pacific International 2018.

=== Miss Asia Pacific International 2018 ===
Akeel competed at the Miss Asia Pacific International 2018 pageant held at the Newport Performing Arts Theater at Pasay. At the end of the pageant, she was crowned as the winner by the outgoing titleholder, Francielly Ouriques of Brazil. She is the fifth Filipina to be crowned Miss Asia Pacific International.

== Political career ==
She ran for governor of Sultan Kudarat in the 2022 elections under the Aksyon Demokratiko banner. She was handedly defeated by her sole opponent, incumbent Datu Abdullah Sangki Mayor Pax Ali Mangudadatu, whose candidacy was cancelled, but was allowed to run via a temporary restraining order from the Supreme Court. During the campaign, she supported the presidential campaign of the then-Manila Mayor Isko Moreno, before eventually supporting the campaign of then-Vice President Leni Robredo.

== Personal life ==
On August 25, 2021, Akeel married Esmael Mangudadatu in a wedding ceremony held at the Al Nor Hotel and Convention Center in Cotabato City. She has two children. A native speaker of Maguindanao language, she also speaks Filipino, Cebuano, Hiligaynon and English.

Awards and achievements
Preceded by (Brazil) Francielly Ouriques	Miss Asia Pacific International; 2018	Succeeded by (Spain) Chaiyenne Huisman
Preceded by Ilene Astrid Cañete de Vera	Mutya ng Pilipinas; 2018	Succeeded by Klyzza Ferrando Castro
