= Maguindanao Provincial Board =

Legislative body of the province of Maguindanao, Philippines

Maguindanao Provincial Board Sangguniang Panlalawigan ng Maguindanao

Type
- Type: Unicameral
- Term limits: 3 terms (9 years)

History
- Founded: 1973
- Disbanded: 2022
- Preceded by: Cotabato Provincial Board
- Succeeded by: Maguindanao del Norte and Maguindanao del Sur Provincial Boards

Structure
- Seats: 14 board members 1 ex officio presiding officer
- Length of term: 3 years
- Authority: Local Government Code of the Philippines

Elections
- Voting system: Multiple non-transferable vote (regular members); Indirect election (ex officio members); Acclamation (sectoral member)

Meeting place
- Maguindanao Provincial Capitol, Buluan

The Maguindanao Provincial Board was the Sangguniang Panlalawigan (provincial legislature) of the Philippine province of Maguindanao.

The members were elected via plurality-at-large voting: the province was divided into two districts, each having five seats. A voter voted up to five names, with the top five candidates per district being elected. The vice governor was the ex officio presiding officer, and only voted to break ties. The vice governor was elected via the plurality voting system province-wide.

The districts used in appropriation of members were coextensive with the legislative districts of Maguindanao., with the exception that Cotabato City, an independent component city, was excluded in the first district.

Aside from the regular members, the board also included the provincial federation presidents of the Liga ng mga Barangay (ABC, from its old name "Association of Barangay Captains"), the Sangguniang Kabataan (SK, youth councils) and the Philippine Councilors League (PCL). Maguindanao's provincial board also had a reserved seat for its indigenous people (IPMR).

The board was disbanded when Maguindanao divided itself into two provinces on September 18, 2022, after a successful plebiscite yesterday. A transition period took place, which lasted until January 9, 2023.

== Apportionment ==
Elections	Seats per district		Ex officio seats	Reserved seats	Total seats
Elections	1st	2nd	Ex officio seats	Reserved seats	Total seats
2010–2022	5	5	3	1	14

== List of members ==
=== Final members ===
These were the members after the 2022 local elections:

- Vice Governor: Bai Ainee Sinsuat (Nacionalista)

District	Board member	Party	Start of term	End of term
1st	Sharifudin Mastura	Nacionalista	June 30, 2022	September 18, 2022
1st	Mashur Biruar	Nacionalista	June 30, 2022	September 18, 2022
1st	Alexa Ashley Tomawis	UBJP	June 30, 2022	September 18, 2022
1st	Rommel Sinsuat	Nacionalista	June 30, 2019	September 18, 2022
1st	Thong Abas Abas	UBJP	June 30, 2022	September 18, 2022
2nd	Nathaniel Midtimbang	Nacionalista	June 30, 2022	September 18, 2022
2nd	Bobby Midtimbang	Nacionalista	June 30, 2022	September 18, 2022
2nd	Kaka Jeng Macapendeg	Nacionalista	June 30, 2022	September 18, 2022
2nd	Yussef Abubakar Paglas	Nacionalista	June 30, 2022	September 18, 2022
2nd	Alonto Bangkulit Sr.	Nacionalista	June 30, 2022	September 18, 2022
League	Board member	Party	Start of term	End of term
ABC		Nonpartisan	July 30, 2018	September 18, 2022
PCL	Vacant		July 1, 2022	September 18, 2022
SK	Hapsa Lagui	Nonpartisan	June 8, 2018	September 18, 2022
Sector	Board member	Party	Start of term	End of term
IPMR	Nilo Mosela	Nonpartisan	September 23, 2019	September 18, 2022
