= Mutya ng Pilipinas 2018 =

Beauty pageant edition

- Date: September 16, 2018
- Presenters: Marc Nelson; Iza Calzado
- Venue: Mall of Asia Arena, Bay City, Pasay, Metro Manila, Philippines
- Broadcaster: ABS-CBN
- Entrants: 50
- Placements: 25
- Winner: Sharifa Akeel; Sultan Kudarat
- Congeniality: Mayuko Hanawa; Japan

Mutya ng Pilipinas 2018 was the 50th Mutya ng Pilipinas pageant, held at the Mall of Asia Arena in Pasay, Metro Manila, Philippines on September 16, 2018.

At the end of the event, Ilene de Vera crowned Sharifa Akeel as Mutya ng Pilipinas-Asia Pacific International 2018. Including her crowned are the new court of winners: Julieane Fernandez was crowned as Mutya ng Pilipinas Tourism International 2018, Kheshapornam Ramachandran was crowned as Mutya ng Pilipinas Tourism Queen of the Year International 2018, Pauline Amelinckx was crowned as Mutya ng Pilipinas Global Beauty Queen 2018, and Jade Skye Roberts was crowned as Mutya ng Pilipinas Overseas Communities 2018. Mary Justine Teng was named first runner-up, while Kristine Malicsi was named second runner-up.

== Results ==
=== Placements ===
Color keys

- The contestant won in an international pageant.
- The contestant was a runner-up in an international pageant.

Placement	Contestant	International placement
Mutya ng Pilipinas Asia Pacific International 2018	#19 Sultan Kudarat – Sharifa Akeel	Winner – Miss Asia Pacific International 2018
Mutya ng Pilipinas Tourism International 2018	#46 Taguig – Julieane Fernandez	4th Runner-Up – Dream Girl of the Year International 2018
Mutya ng Pilipinas Tourism Queen of the Year International 2018	#30 Iloilo City – Kheshapornam Ramachandran	No international pageant held
Mutya ng Pilipinas Global Beauty Queen 2018	#24 Bohol – Pauline Amelinckx	No international pageant held
Mutya ng Pilipinas Overseas Communities 2018	#1 Australia – Jade Skye Roberts	
1st runner-up	#48 Muntinlupa – Mary Justine Teng	
2nd runner-up	#42 Navotas – Kristine Micah Malicsi	
Top 12	#3 Melbourne – Ebony Bangit; #13 Pangasinan – Anie Uson; #21 Los Angeles – Nina Ancheta; #23 Manila – Agatha Lei Romero; #47 Cebu City – Maria Fe Loayon	
Top 25	#4 Legazpi – Rein Hillary Carrascal; #7 Florida – Harmony Matson; #8 Bahrain – Arianne Deseree Viardo; #11 Davao City – Odessa de la Cuesta; #18 East Coast Canada – Marseilaise Perkins; #22 Northern California – Jeserey Sanchez; #25 Netherlands – Bettina Dingemans; #27 Southern California – Allison Lorenzo; #29 Cainta – Ana Clarice Patrimonio §; #34 Meycauayan – Geri Franchesca Camargo; #39 Antipolo – Honey Grace Cartasano; #44 Marilao – Nikka Marie Castro; #50 Germany – Sabrina Binder	

§ – People's Choice

== Special awards ==
=== Major awards ===
Award	Contestant
Best in Talent	#49 Japan – Mayuko Hanawa
Best in Swimsuit	#21 Los Angeles – Nina Ancheta
Best in Answer	#19 Sultan Kudarat – Sharifa Akeel
Best in Long Gown	#19 Sultan Kudarat – Sharifa Akeel
Miss Congeniality	#49 Japan – Mayuko Hanawa
Best in Terno	#24 Bohol – Pauline Amelinckx

=== Sponsor awards ===
Award	Contestant
Mutya ng Hannah	#39 Antipolo – Honey Grace Cartasano
Mutya ng ThioCel	#48 Muntinlupa – Mary Justine Teng
Mutya ng CWC	#46 Taguig – Julieane Fernandez
Mutya ng Cebu Landmasters Inc.	#23 Manila – Agatha Lei Romero
Mutya ng Zen Institute	#24 Bohol – Pauline Amelinckx
Miss Avon Fashion	#24 Bohol – Pauline Amelinckx
Ambassadors of AR Travel & Tours	#9 Caloocan – Mae Kimberly de Luna; #19 Sultan Kudarat – Sharifa Akeel; #21 Los Angeles – Nina Ancheta; #29 Cainta – Ana Clarice Patrimonio; #50 Germany – Sabrina Binder
Ambassadors of Sol Y Viento Mountain Hot Springs Resort	#35 San Ildefonso – Teemee Miguel; #42 Navotas – Kristine Micah Malicsi; #48 Muntinlupa – Mary Justine Teng; #24 Bohol – Pauline Amelinckx; #46 Taguig – Julieane Fernandez
Mutya ng Zanea Shoes	#19 Sultan Kudarat – Sharifa Akeel
Mutya ng Mags	#24 Bohol – Pauline Amelinckx
Mutya ng Rain or Shine	#13 Pangasinan – Anie Uson
Mutya ng Aposento	#46 Taguig – Julieane Fernandez
Mutya ng Camera Club of the Philippines	#24 Bohol – Pauline Amelinckx
Mutya ng Herman Miller	#21 Los Angeles – Nina Ancheta
Mutya ng Pilipinas Smile by Lito Sy	#21 Los Angeles – Nina Ancheta
Mutya ng Sagip Anghel	#18 East Coast Canada – Marseilaise Perkins; #40 Santo Tomas – Patricia Robles (tie)

== Contestants ==
Fifty contestants competed for the four titles.

No.	Contestant	Age (Note: Ages at the time of the pageant)	Hometown
1	Jade Skye Roberts	24	Australia
2	Souarthizae Aynouzscia Violon	20	Cagayan de Oro
3	Ebony Victoria Bangit	19	Melbourne
4	Rein Hillary Carrascal	20	Legazpi
5	Richelle Valerie Pailden	24	General Santos
6	Gezza Avila	21	Candelaria
7	Harmony Matson	24	Florida
8	Arianne Deseree Viardo	22	Bahrain
9	Mae Kimberly de Luna	21	Caloocan
10	Marina Mercedes Mendoza	18	San Fernando
11	Odessa de la Cuesta	22	Davao City
12	Joana Marie Martinez	19	Valenzuela
13	Anie Uson	21	Pangasinan
14	Princess Mariel Palo	21	Agoncillo
15	Mina Kim	20	Makati
16	Shanon Jumalyn Tampon	21	Quezon City
17	Lady Russel Panaguiton	20	Denmark
18	Marseilaise Perkins	22	East Coast Canada
19	Sharifa Akeel	21	Sultan Kudarat
20	Jessica Duhay	19	Arizona
21	Nina Ancheta	22	Los Angeles
22	Jeserey Sanchez	23	Northern California
23	Agatha Lei Romero	23	Manila
24	Pauline Amelinckx	23	Bohol
25	Bettina Reloj Dingemans	21	Netherlands
26	Katrina Mae Sese	22	Tarlac City
27	Allison Lorenzo	21	Southern California
28	Allhia Charmaine Estores	22	Cavite
29	Anna Clarice Patrimonio	24	Cainta
30	Kheshapornam Ramachandran	18	Iloilo City
31	Alexandra Abdon	24	Pasig
32	Hannah Bithiah Meriño	22	Laguna
33	Lishairra James Portugal	21	Binangonan
34	Geri Franchesca Camargo	18	Meycauayan
35	Teemee Miguel	21	San Ildefonso
36	Hulda Margaret Sigurdardottir	24	Iceland
37	Alexandra Michaela Bobadilla	20	Parañaque
38	Eunice Abegail Banagudos	18	Negros Oriental
39	Honey Grace Cartasano	25	Antipolo
40	Patricia Kimberly Robles	24	Santo Tomas
41	Julie Ann Gil	21	Lucena
42	Kristine Micah Malicsi	21	Navotas
43	Anne Nathalie Ruth Longakit	21	West Coast Canada
44	Nikka Marie Cristina Castro	22	Marilao
45	Erginia Vera Bautista	21	Cabanatuan
46	Juliane Fernandez	21	Taguig
47	Maria Fe Loayon	19	Cebu City
48	Mary Justine Teng	22	Muntinlupa
49	Mayuko Hanawa	23	Japan
50	Sabrina Binder	22	Germany

== Post-pageant notes ==
- Sharifa Akeel was crowned as Miss Asia Pacific International 2018.
- Julieanne Fernandez placed 4th runner-up / Dream Girl of the Year International at Miss Tourism International 2018–2019.
