= Cesar Adib Majul =

Filipino historian (1923–2003)

Cesar Adib Majul (October 21, 1923 - October 11, 2003) was a Philippine historian best known for his work on the history of Islam in the Philippines, and on the life of Apolinario Mabini.

Majul was born in Aparri, Cagayan, Philippine Islands, to an Ibanag mother and a Syrian Orthodox Christian father. He was educated at the University of the Philippines and Cornell University.

== Education ==
He acquired his primary and secondary education at the De La Salle High School. At the advent of the Second World War, he postponed his studies and only entered college after the war. In 1947, he obtained his Bachelor's Degree in Philosophy at the University of the Philippines-Diliman and afterwards, got his Master's degree in the same course at the same university, six years after in 1953. His Master's thesis advisor was Dr. Ricardo Pascual, one of the eminent Filipino philosophers. In 1957, he went to Cornell University to obtain his Doctorate degree.

== Career ==
From 1961 to 1966, Majul was Dean of the University College at the University of the Philippines, and Dean of the College of Arts and Sciences from 1969 to 1971.

Majul studied and wrote about the Moro people and the history of Islam in the Philippines. He helped the future Moro revolutionary leader Nur Misuari become a lecturer at the University of the Philippines.

In 1973, Majul published his seminal work, Muslims in the Philippines, which is considered the definitive text on the subject.

He converted to Islam in his adulthood, later living in the United States. He died of prostate cancer on Saturday, October 11, 2003 in his home in San Pablo, California.

== Awards ==
He received the Republic Heritage Award for "the most outstanding contribution to historical writing" during the period from May 1, 1960 to April 30, 1961, as well as the First Prize in the Biography Contest on the life of Apolinario Mabini in 1964. He also received the Distinguished Scholar Award in 1968 from the University of the Philippines.

== Selected works ==
- Muslims in the Philippines, University of the Philippines Press (1973, 1999) ISBN 971-542-188-1
- The Political and Constitutional Ideas of the Philippine Revolution, University of the Philippines Press (1957, 1999) ISBN 971-542-115-6
- Apolinario Mabini: Revolutionary, National Historical Commission (1964)
- Mabini and the Philippine Revolution, University of the Philippines Press (1960)

== See also ==
- Arab settlement in the Philippines
- Islam in the Philippines
