= Notre Dame of Salaman College =

Roman Catholic college in Sultan Kudarat, Philippines

- Dalubhasaang Notre Dame ng Salaman (Filipino)
- Motto: Service for the Love of God Through Mary
- Type: Private, Catholic secondary and higher education institution
- Established: 1965; 61 years ago
- Founder: Missionary Oblates of Mary Immaculate
- Religious affiliation: Roman Catholic
- President: Fr. Charlie D. Celeste, DCC, JCL
- Location: Poblacion II, Lebak, Sultan Kudarat, Philippines; 6°37′40″N 124°04′02″E
- Campus: Urban
- Nickname: Damean
- Location in Mindanao Location in the Philippines

Notre Dame of Salaman College is a private Catholic secondary and higher education institution run by the Diocesan Clergy of Cotabato (DCC) in Lebak, Sultan Kudarat, Philippines. Established by the Oblates in 1965, it offers secondary, technical /vocational and degree programs.

The academic community is administered by a diocesan cleric with its lay faculty and staff and parents who are committed to the holistic development of the students by employing method and practice anchored to the vision-mission of the institution. It has been a member of the Notre Dame Educational Association, a group of schools named Notre Dame in the Philippines under the patronage of the Blessed Virgin Mary.

The school was founded by the Oblate of Mary Immaculate (OMI) and the administration was succeeded by the Religious of Virgin Mary (RVM). Year 2013 marks a significant milestone in the history of the school as it is officially turned over to the stewardship of the Archdiocesan Notre Dame Schools of Cotabato (ANDSC) system. Thus, the school became a member school of the Archdiocesan Notre Dame Schools of Cotabato. Standardization of teachers’ professional qualifications was institutionalized. All non – licensed teachers were mandated to take the board exam for teachers and must acquire their licenses to teach. Salaries and other benefits were homogenized with other member schools of thesystem.

Notre Dame of Salaman College has achieved its recognition (Rank 4) among all the colleges and universities in Soccsksargen area, formerly known as Central Mindanao, designated as Region XII, in terms of the average performance with 50 takers - above in the Teachers Licensure Examination for the last four years (school-years 2011-2015). This was correlated also to the school’s quality academic instructions, facilities and other programs and services. Recently, more infrastructures were built such as the 2-storey building with 12 classrooms for the Juniors High School, the 4-storey building for the Senior High School and 39 TESDA Programs, construction of Program Heads’ offices, construction of sports facilities and soon to be constructed additional 3-storey building for the college department in preparation for the offering of new courses. Junior and Senior High School classrooms were equipped with technology relating to the latest curriculum innovations (Robotics and Aralinks Program.

== Notable alumni ==
- Sharifa Akeel - Beauty queen
