= Datu Anggal Midtimbang =

Municipality in Maguindanao del Sur, Philippines

- Municipality
- Municipality of Datu Anggal Midtimbang
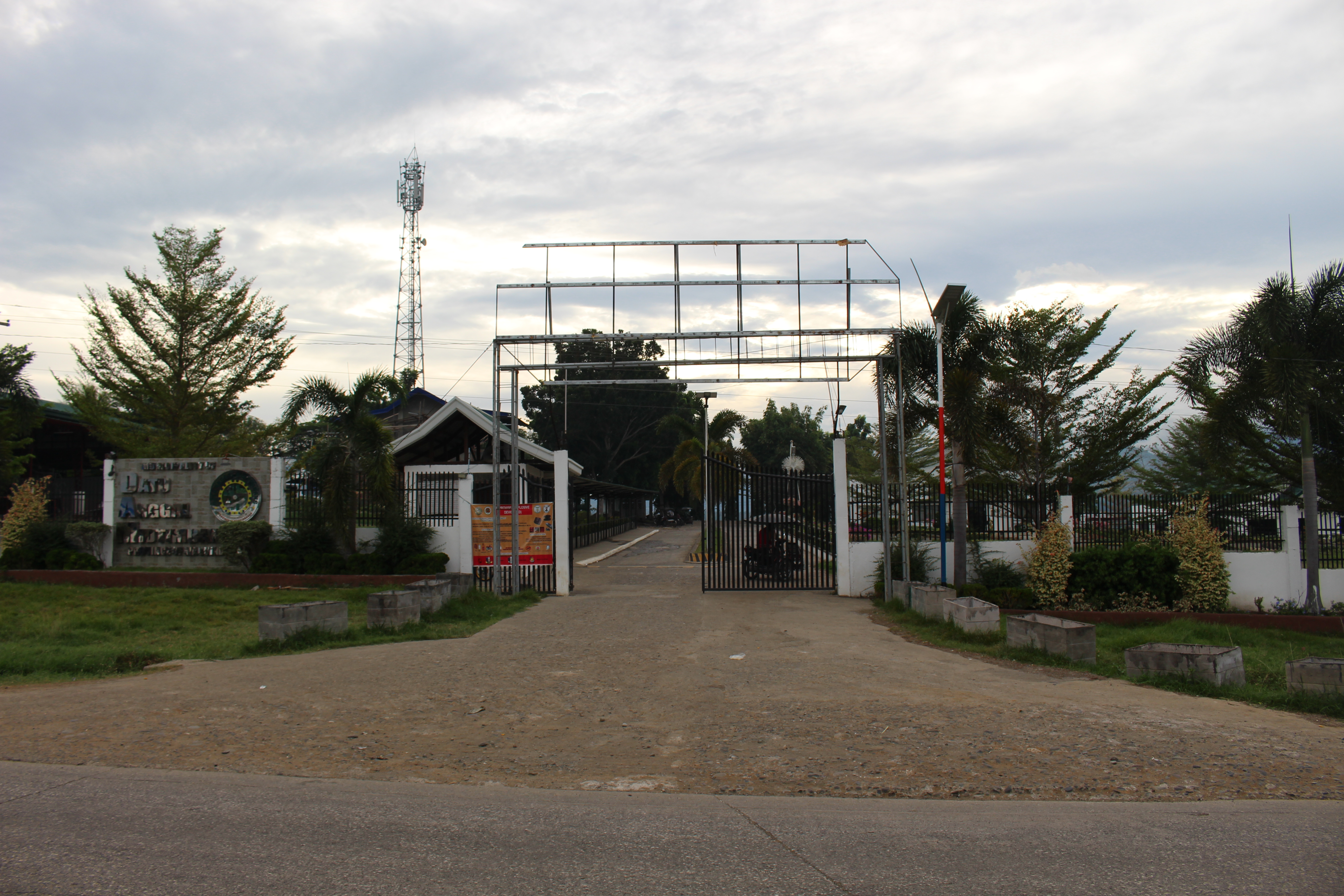
- Municipal Compound

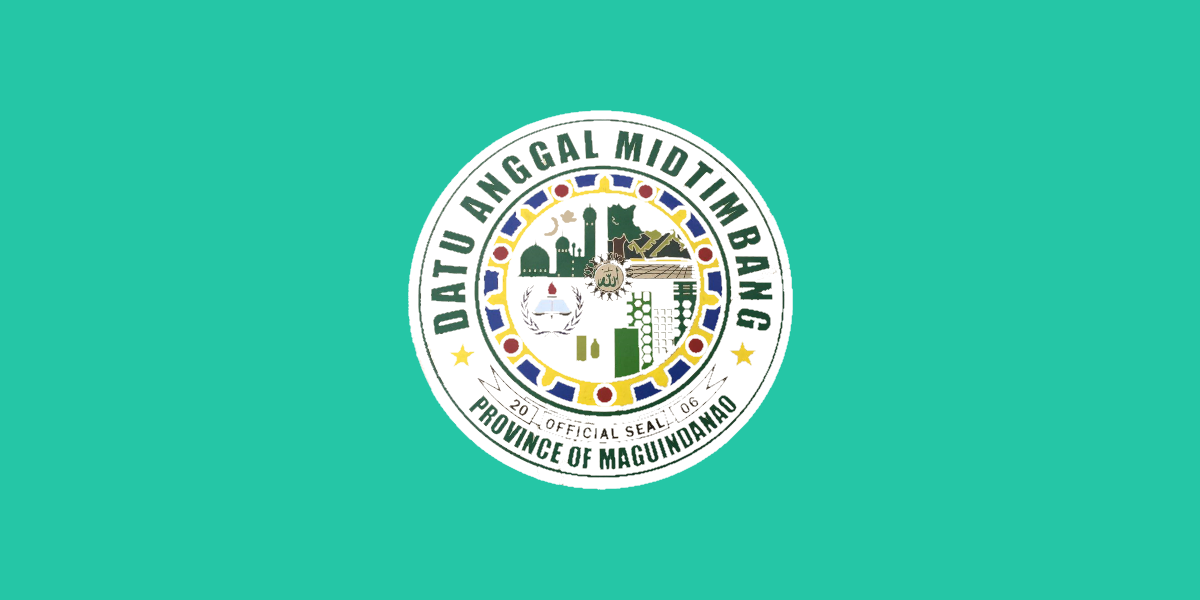
- Flag Seal

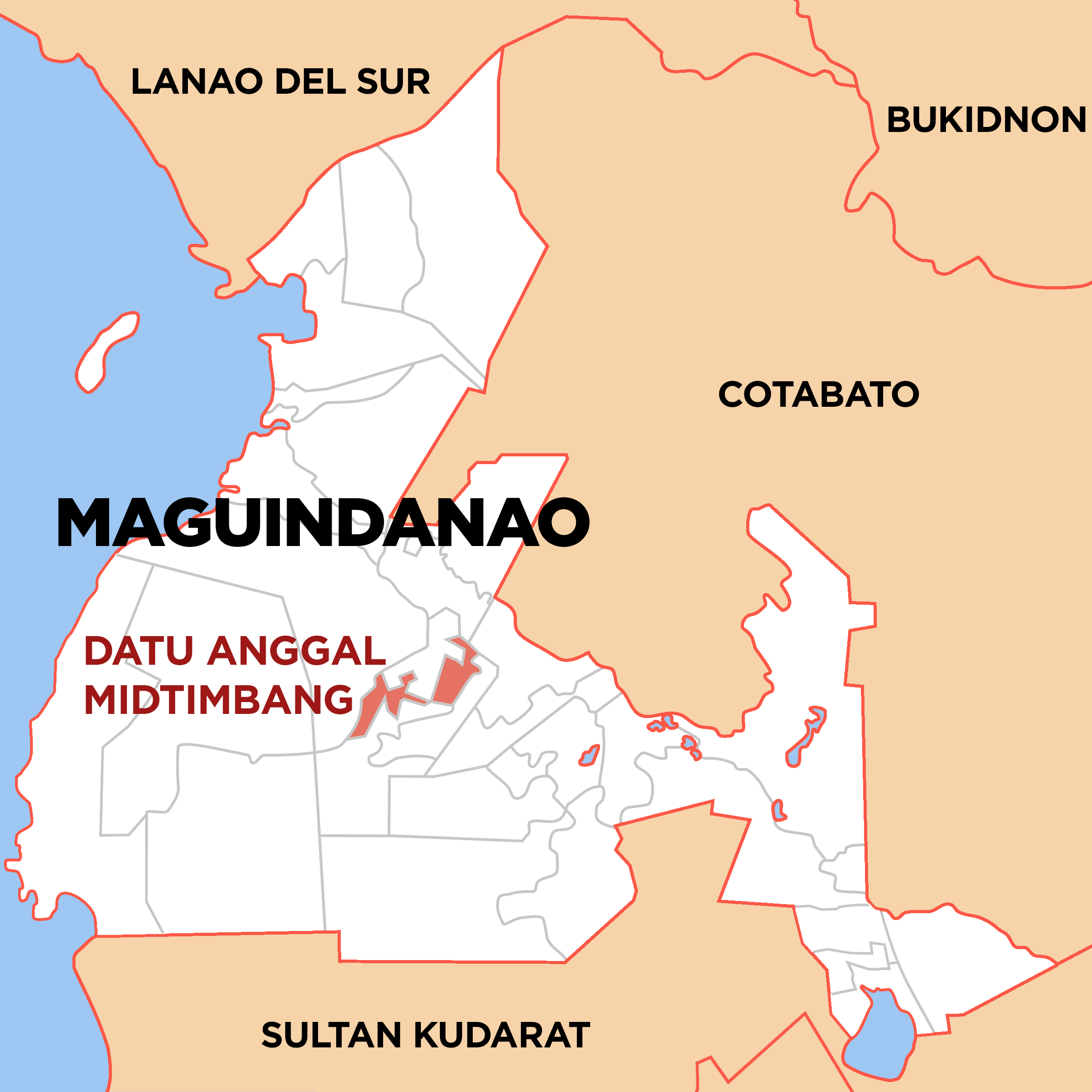
- Map of Maguindanao del Sur with Datu Anggal Midtimbang highlighted
- Interactive map of Datu Anggal Midtimbang
- Location within the Philippines
- Coordinates: 6°59′36″N 124°20′30″E
- Country: Philippines
- Region: Bangsamoro Autonomous Region in Muslim Mindanao
- Province: Maguindanao del Sur
- House district: Lone district
- Parliamentary district: 1st district
- Founded: December 30, 2006
- Barangays: 7 (see Barangays)

Government
  - Type: Sangguniang Bayan
  - Mayor: Datu Nathaniel S. Midtimbang
  - Vice Mayor: Maryjoy Estephanie U. Midtimbang
  - House Representative: Datu Esmael G. Mangudadatu
  - Municipal Council: Members: Ebrahim K. Midtimbang Jr.; Kilaw M. Gulam; Amilil S. Akmad; Sandiale I. Sultan; Ebrahim M. Kasan; Silongan U. Paco; Guiamaludin G. Masukat; Baser T. Kawilan
  - Electorate: 17,498 voters (2025)

Area
  - Total: 85.43 km^{2} (32.98 sq mi)
- Elevation: 52 m (171 ft)
- Highest elevation: 345 m (1,132 ft)
- Lowest elevation: 2 m (6.6 ft)

Population (2024 census)
  - Total: 35,243
  - Density: 412.5/km^{2} (1,068/sq mi)
  - Households: 4,409

Economy
  - Income class: 4th municipal income class
  - Poverty incidence: 54.52% (2023)
  - Revenue: ₱ 128.8 million (2024)
  - Assets: ₱ 96.73 million (2024)
  - Expenditure: ₱ 147 million (2024)
  - Liabilities: ₱ 51.48 million (2024)

Service provider
  - Electricity: Maguindanao Electric Cooperative (MAGELCO)
- Time zone: UTC+8 (PST)
- ZIP code: 9612
- PSGC: 1903831000
- IDD : area code: +63 (0)64
- Native languages: Maguindanao; Tagalog

Datu Anggal Midtimbang, officially the Municipality of Datu Anggal Midtimbang (Maguindanaon: Ingud nu Datu Anggal Midtimbang; Iranun: Inged a Datu Anggal Midtimbang; Tagalog: Bayan ng Datu Anggal Midtimbang), is a municipality in the province of Maguindanao del Sur, Philippines. According to the 2024, it had a population of 35,243.

== Etymology ==
The name originated from Datu Anggal Midtimbang, the father of Datu Udzag Midtimbang, the first mayor and the founder of Talayan, Maguindanao del Sur; Datu Midpantao Sr., the former mayor of the municipality of Guindulungan; and Datu Ali Midtimbang Sr., the former mayor of Talayan.

== History ==
During the second regular session of the fifth legislative assembly of the Autonomous Region in Muslim Mindanao, the regional legislature created Datu Anggal Midtimbang out of three barangays of Talayan and four from Talitay, by virtue of Muslim Mindanao Autonomy Act No. 207, which was subsequently ratified in a plebiscite held on December 30, 2006.

The ARMM law creating the municipality provides that its administrative center shall be established in barangay Brar.

== Geography ==
=== Barangays ===
Datu Anggal Midtimbang is politically subdivided into 7 barangays. Each barangay consists of puroks while some have sitios.

- Adaon
- Brar
- Mapayag
- Midtimbang (Poblacion)
- Nunangan (Nunangen)
- Tugal
- Tulunan

=== Climate ===
Climate data for Datu Anggal Midtimbang, Maguindanao del Sur
Month	Jan	Feb	Mar	Apr	May	Jun	Jul	Aug	Sep	Oct	Nov	Dec	Year
Mean daily maximum °C (°F)	31 (88)	32 (90)	32 (90)	32 (90)	31 (88)	30 (86)	29 (84)	29 (84)	30 (86)	30 (86)	30 (86)	31 (88)	31 (87)
Mean daily minimum °C (°F)	21 (70)	21 (70)	22 (72)	23 (73)	23 (73)	23 (73)	23 (73)	23 (73)	23 (73)	23 (73)	23 (73)	22 (72)	23 (72)
Average precipitation mm (inches)	30 (1.2)	19 (0.7)	23 (0.9)	24 (0.9)	64 (2.5)	88 (3.5)	102 (4.0)	105 (4.1)	76 (3.0)	82 (3.2)	60 (2.4)	26 (1.0)	699 (27.4)
Average rainy days	9.8	8.5	11.3	11.9	21.6	23.9	24.1	24.5	20.9	21.8	16.8	11.8	206.9
Source: Meteoblue (modeled/calculated data, not measured locally)

== Demographics ==
Population census of Datu Anggal Midtimbang
Year	Pop.	±% p.a.
2007	23,713	—
2010	13,339	−18.89%
2015	25,016	+12.72%
2020	28,224	+2.57%
2024	35,243	+5.48%
Source: Philippine Statistics Authority

== Economy ==
Poverty Incidence of Datu Anggal Midtimbang

Source: Philippine Statistics Authority
