= Guindulungan =

Municipality in Maguindanao del Sur, Philippines

- Municipality
- Municipality of Guindulungan
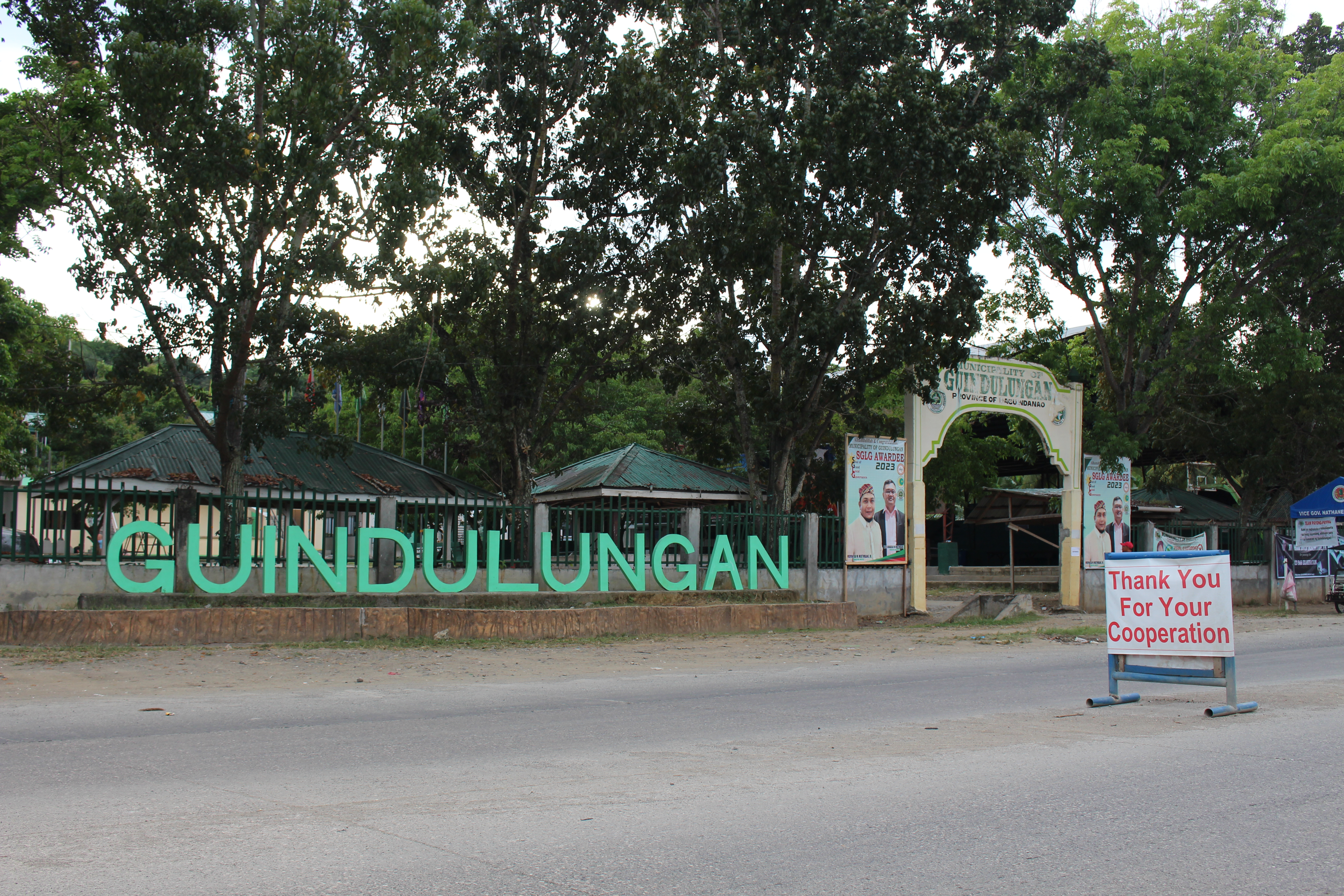
- Municipal Compound

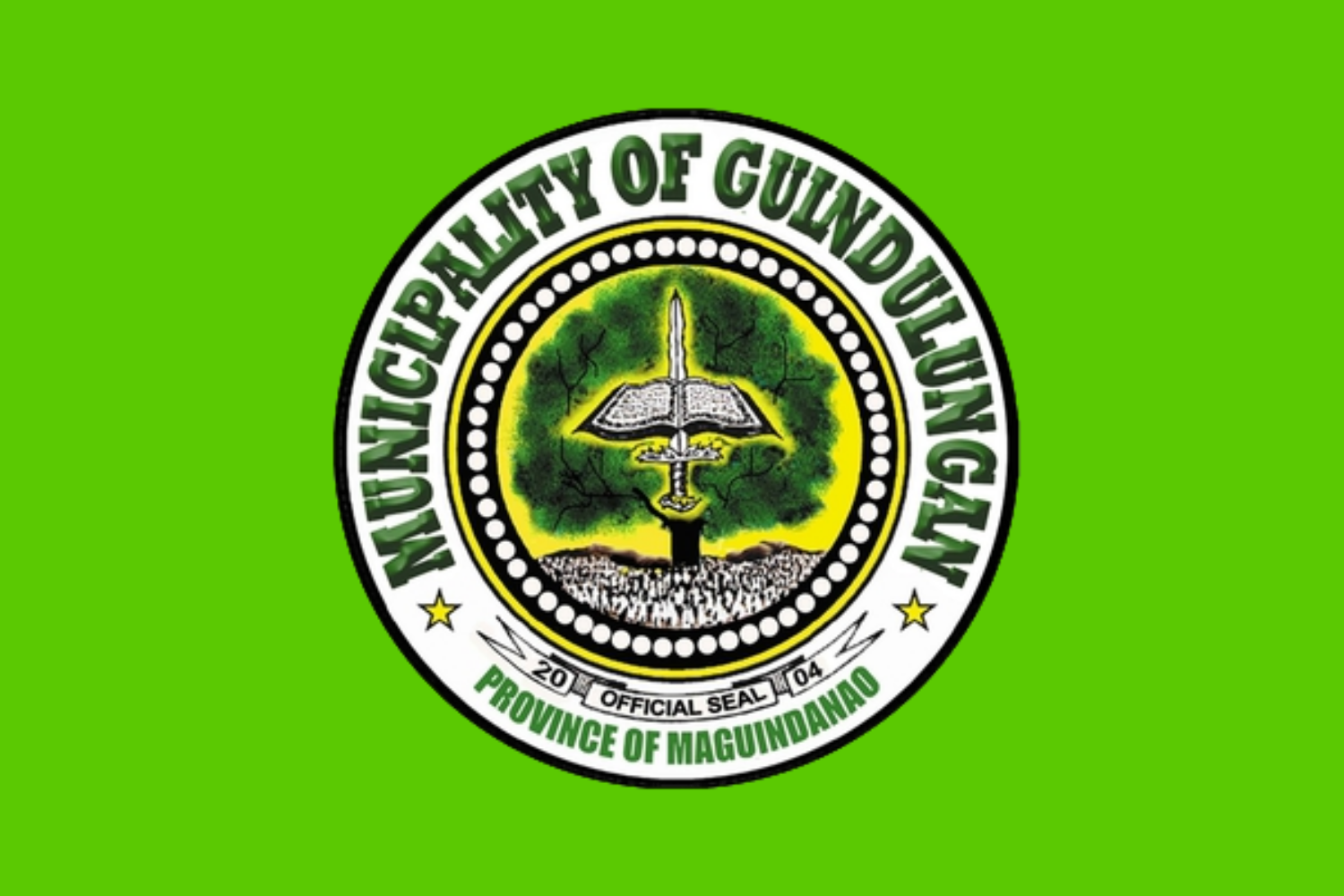
- Flag Seal

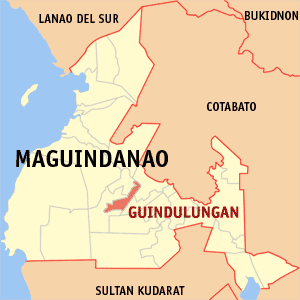
- Map of Maguindanao del Sur with Guindulungan highlighted
- Interactive map of Guindulungan
- Location within the Philippines
- Coordinates: 6°58′35″N 124°23′10″E
- Country: Philippines
- Region: Bangsamoro Autonomous Region in Muslim Mindanao
- Province: Maguindanao del Sur
- House district: Lone district
- Parliamentary district: 1st district
- Founded: March 31, 2003
- Barangays: 11 (see Barangays)

Government
  - Type: Sangguniang Bayan
  - Mayor: Datu Guiadzali M. Midtimbang JD.
  - Vice Mayor: Datu Midpantao M. Midtimbang, Jr.
  - House Representative: Mohamad P. Paglas Sr.
  - Municipal Council: Members: Manan S. Guiomla; Macma T. Ali; Babydhats K. Midtimbang; Mustapha P. Datukusin; Abdul-Harikan S. Midtimbang; Sahod M. Utto; Rasol G. Unas; Datudido Samama
  - Electorate: 13,547 voters (2025)

Area
  - Total: 130.68 km^{2} (50.46 sq mi)
- Elevation: 55 m (180 ft)
- Highest elevation: 382 m (1,253 ft)
- Lowest elevation: 4 m (13 ft)

Population (2024 census)
  - Total: 28,471
  - Density: 217.87/km^{2} (564.28/sq mi)
  - Households: 3,868

Economy
  - Income class: 4th municipal income class
  - Poverty incidence: 60.47% (2023)
  - Revenue: ₱ 136.4 million (2024)
  - Assets: ₱ 175 million (2024)
  - Expenditure: ₱ 138.3 million (2024)
  - Liabilities: ₱ 10.71 million (2024)

Service provider
  - Electricity: Maguindanao Electric Cooperative (MAGELCO)
- Time zone: UTC+8 (PST)
- ZIP code: 9612
- PSGC: 1903825000
- IDD : area code: +63 (0)64
- Native languages: Maguindanao; Tagalog

Guindulungan, officially the Municipality of Guindulungan (Maguindanaon: Ingud nu Guindulungan; Iranun: Inged a Guindulungan; Tagalog: Bayan ng Guindulungan), is a municipality in the province of Maguindanao del Sur, Philippines. According to the 2024 census, it had a population of 28,471.

It was created under Muslim Mindanao Autonomy Act No. 139 on March 31, 2003, carved out of the municipality of Talayan.

The first appointed mayor during its creation as a new municipality was Hadji Datu Midpantao M. Midtimbang, Sr., a well known religious leader who also served as mayor of Talayan and as vice governor of Maguindanao. The municipality is inhabited by 99% Maguindanaons.

== Geography ==
=== Barangays ===
Guindulungan is politically subdivided into 11 barangays. Each barangay consists of puroks while some have sitios.

- Ahan
- Bagan
- Datalpandan
- Kalumamis
- Kateman
- Lambayao
- Macasampen
- Muslim
- Muti
- Sampao
- Tambunan II

=== Climate ===
Climate data for Guindulungan, Maguindanao del Sur
Month	Jan	Feb	Mar	Apr	May	Jun	Jul	Aug	Sep	Oct	Nov	Dec	Year
Mean daily maximum °C (°F)	31 (88)	32 (90)	32 (90)	32 (90)	31 (88)	29 (84)	29 (84)	29 (84)	30 (86)	30 (86)	30 (86)	31 (88)	31 (87)
Mean daily minimum °C (°F)	21 (70)	21 (70)	21 (70)	23 (73)	23 (73)	23 (73)	23 (73)	23 (73)	23 (73)	23 (73)	23 (73)	22 (72)	22 (72)
Average precipitation mm (inches)	30 (1.2)	19 (0.7)	25 (1.0)	24 (0.9)	64 (2.5)	88 (3.5)	102 (4.0)	105 (4.1)	76 (3.0)	82 (3.2)	60 (2.4)	26 (1.0)	701 (27.5)
Average rainy days	9.8	8.5	11.3	11.9	21.6	23.9	24.1	24.5	20.9	21.8	16.8	11.8	206.9
Source: Meteoblue (modeled/calculated data, not measured locally)

== Demographics ==
Population census of Guindulungan
Year	Pop.	±% p.a.
2007	23,777	—
2010	16,071	−13.29%
2015	19,911	+4.16%
2020	24,933	+4.85%
2024	28,471	+3.24%
Source: Philippine Statistics Authority

== Economy ==
Poverty Incidence of Guindulungan

Source: Philippine Statistics Authority
