= Pax Ali Mangudadatu =

Filipino governor

Datu Pax Ali Mangudadatu
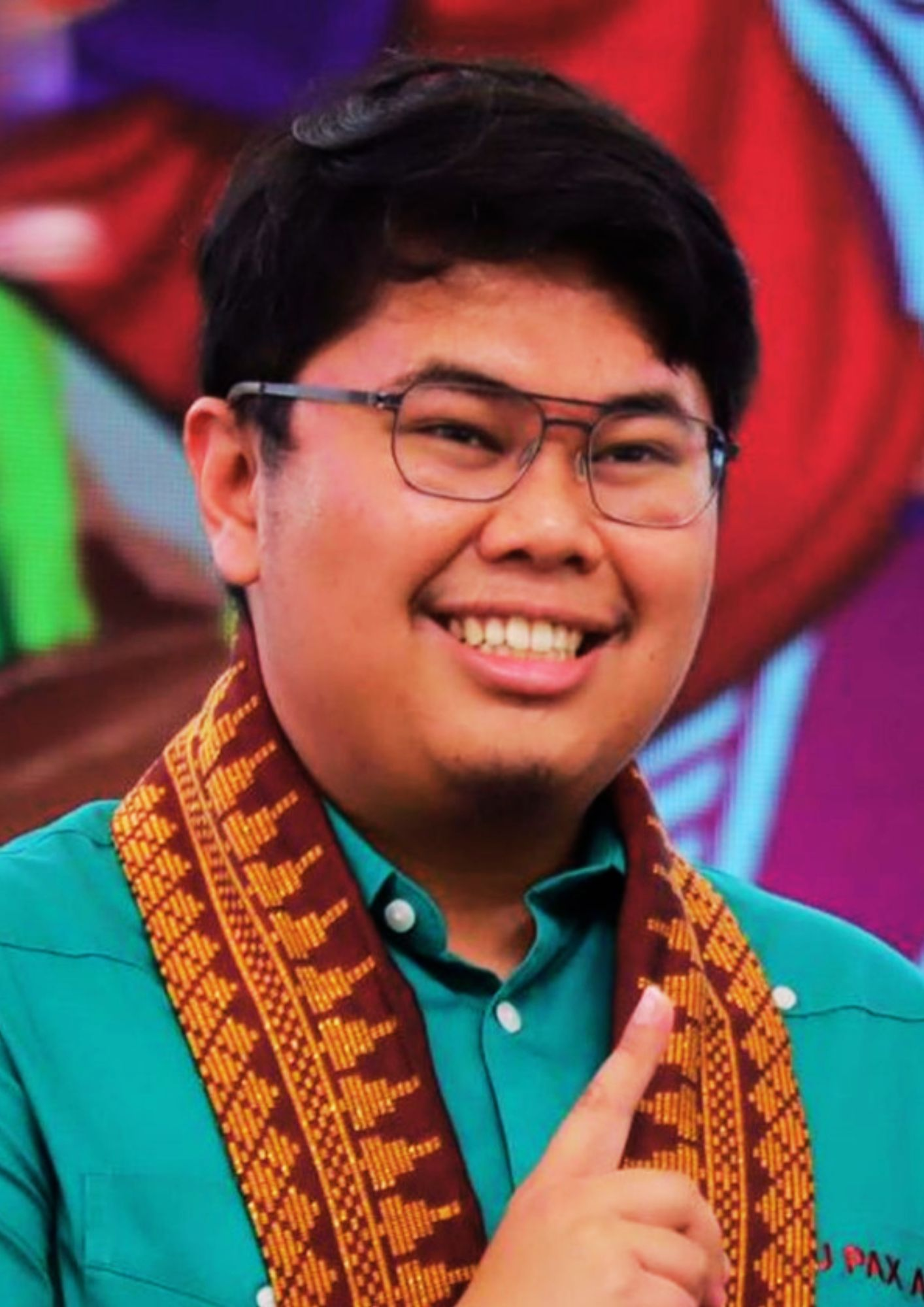
- Mangudadatu in 2023

Governor of Sultan Kudarat
- Incumbent
- Assumed office June 30, 2022
- Vice Governor: Raden Sakaluran
- Preceded by: Suharto Mangudadatu

Mayor of Datu Abdullah Sangki
- In office June 30, 2019 – June 30, 2022
- Preceded by: Mariam Mangudadatu
- Succeeded by: Suharto Al Wali Mangudadatu

Personal details
- Born: October 12, 1997 (age 28) Koronadal, South Cotabato, Philippines
- Party: Lakas–CMD (2021–present)
- Other political affiliations: Nacionalista (2018–2021)
- Parents: Suharto Mangudadatu (father); Mariam Sangki (mother)
- Relatives: Pax Mangudadatu (grandfather)
- Occupation: Politician

Pax Ali Sangki Mangudadatu (born October 12, 1997) is a Filipino politician who is the governor of Sultan Kudarat from 2022. He assumed office aged only 24, having served as mayor of Datu Abdullah Sangki from 2019—when he was 21—to 2022.

== Background ==
Pax Ali Sangki Mangudadatu was the incumbent elected Mayor of Datu Abullah Sangki in Maguindanao prior to seeking gubernatorial post in Sultan Kudarat in May 2022 election. Pax Ali is a son of Suharto Mangudadatu and Mariam Sangki. He came from the Mangudadatu clan, a political family with both his parents involved in politics. His grandfather is Pax Mangudadatu who was likewise a politician. He has his Master's in Public Safety Administration from Philippine Public Safety College.

== Controversies ==
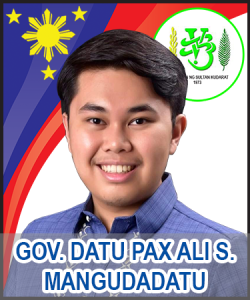
Official Portrait as governor

Pax Ali Mangudadatu ran for the position of governor of Sultan Kudarat in the 2022 elections as a candidate under Lakas–CMD despite being the mayor of a municipality in a different province. The Commission on Election cancelled Pax Ali's candidacy on January 18, 2022. However, Pax Ali on May 6, 2022 was able to secure a temporary restraining order for the cancellation of his candidacy allowing him to stand for election.
