= Miss Asia Pacific International 2018 =

- Date: 4 October 2018
- Presenters: Mark Nelson; Rovilon Fernandez; Joey Mead - King; Sam YG
- Venue: Newport Performing Arts Theater, Pasay, Metro Manila, Philippines
- Entrants: 51
- Placements: 20
- Winner: Sharifa Akeel; Philippines
- Best National Costume: Kilmara Nayubel Carvajal (Panama)

Miss Asia Pacific International 2018 was the third Miss Asia Pacific International pageant after its 2016 re-launch, held at the Newport Performing Arts Theater, in Pasay, Metro Manila, Philippines, on October 4, 2018.

Francielly Ouriques of Brazil crowned Sharifa Akeel of the Philippines at the end of the event.

== Results ==
=== Placements ===
Placement	Contestant
Miss Asia Pacific International 2018	Philippines – Sharifa Akeel
1st Runner-Up	Brazil – Gabriela Palma
2nd Runner-Up (Note: Costa Rica was dethroned because she competed at Miss Eco International 6 months later despite a contract that she cannot compete at any pageant within a year. Mongolia and Venezuela went up the rankings and Netherlands was given the 4th runner-up position.)	Costa Rica – Jessica Melania (dethroned)
2nd Runner-Up	Mongolia – Misheelt Narmandakh (assumed)
3rd Runner-Up	Venezuela – Mariani Nataly Chacón (assumed)
4th Runner-Up	Netherlands – Raquel van Gool (assumed)

=== Pre-Pageant ===
The following are pre-pageant awards.

=== Special Awards I ===
Awards	1st Place	2nd Place	3rd Place
Darling of the Press	Sharifa Akeel; Philippines	Madeline Andrea Ferrara; Germany	Gabriela Palma; Brazil
Best in National Costume	Kilmara Nayubel Carvajal Salcedo; Panama	Huynh Thuy Vi; Vietnam	Sharifa Akeel; Philippines
Best in Swimsuit	Gabriela Palma; Brazil	Sharifa Akeel; Philippines	Natalia Gurgel; Uruguay
Best in Long Gown	Sharifa Akeel; Philippines	Gabriela Palma; Brazil	Natalia Gurgel; Uruguay
Best in Talent	Didar Atmaja; Kazakhstan	Ariel Jingjing Cao; Canada	Teuira Raechel Shanti Napa; Cook Islands

=== Special Awards II ===
Placement	Candidate
People's Choice Awardee	Italy – Kim Ashly Vito
Miss Redfox	India – Abhilasha Agrawal
Miss Strong Hold	Peru – Karen Isabel Rojas
Miss Inglot	Germany – Madeline Andrea Ferrara
Miss Hotel 101	Peru – Karen Isabel Rojas
Miss Inspirational	Portugal – Andrea Filipa Duarte Pereira
Miss Selective Professional	Panama – Kilmara Nayubel Carvajal Salcedo

== Candidates ==
Candidates from 51 countries competed for the 2018 MAPI title:

Country/Territory	Delegate	Age	City
Armenia	Sona Danielyan	20	Yerevan
Australia	Sapir Turkenitz	25	Melbourne
Bangladesh	Marjana Ratia Ahmed Chowdhury	24	Dhaka
Belgium	Danique van Holsten	21	Ghent
Bolivia	Gianna Ruth Ardaya Ramirez	19	Guayaramerin
Brazil	Gabriela Palma	26	Ribeirão Preto
Cambodia	Annchhany Kha	23	Kompong Cham
Canada	Ariel Jingjing Caoi	28	Winnipeg
China	Liang Xiang Ying	19	Wuhan
Colombia	Melissa Lopez Rios	22	Barrancabermeja
Cook Islands	Teuira Raechel Shanti Napa	18	Avarua
Costa Rica	Melania Gonzales	20	Liberia
Ecuador	Natalia Andrade	19	Cuenca
El Salvador	Olga Maria Flores Ortiz	22	Soyapango
France	Pauline Dubedat	19	Nancy
Germany	Madeline Andrea Ferrara	20	Gelsenkirchen
Greece	Christina Alicia Lazaros	24	Santorini
Guatemala	Alejandra Castro	25	Huehuetenango
Hong Kong	Ching Yee Chong	20	Tsuen Wan
India	Abhilasha Agrawal	21	Bhubaneshwar
Indonesia	Yohana Gabriela	27	Balikpapan
Italy	Kim Ashly Vito	18	Turin
Japan	Momoe Yada	20	Kyoto
Kazakhstan	Didar Atmaja	25	Kokshetau
Macau	Yang Jing	19	Taipa
Malaysia	Crystal Tung Lu Yie	25	Kuala Lumpur
Mauritius	Manjusha Faugoo	19	Beau-Bassin Rose-Hill
Mexico	Lisset Perez	23	Tlaquepaque
Mongolia	Misheelt Narmandakh	18	Ulaanbaatar
Morocco	Chaimaa Hejam	24	Rif
Myanmar	Yee Yee San	19	Mandalay
Nepal	Aastha Saakha	23	Kathmandu
Netherlands	Raquel van Gool	19	Eindhoven
New Zealand	Brooke Rachel Houia	23	Kawerau
Nigeria	Stephanie Nete Omogun	18	Calabar
Panama	Kilmara Nayubel Carvajal Salcedo	18	Nombre de Dios
Peru	Karen Isabel Rojas Chavez	18	Moyobamba
Philippines	Sharifa Akeel	21	Lebak
Portugal	Andreia Filipa Duarte Pereira	18	Guimarães
Puerto Rico	Kimberly Crespo Faria	21	Bayamón
Russia	Olga Pliusnina	18	St. Petersburg
Singapore	Nerrine Ng	23	Singapore City
South Africa	Monique Best	27	Soshanguve
South Korea	Songhwa Kang	28	Daegu
Suriname	Michantely Chanel Cornelly Lisse	19	Paramaribo
Thailand	Sirakan Chaiprasit	18	Chiang Mai
United States	Mackenzie Lawrence	22	Dripping Springs
Uruguay	Natalia Gurgel	21	Minas
Venezuela	Mariani Nataly Chacon Angarita	19	Catia La Mar
Vietnam	Huynh Thuy Vi	26	Ho Chi Minh City

== See also ==
- List of beauty contests
- Miss Asia Pacific International
