= Pax Mangudadatu =

Filipino politician

Pakung Mangudadatu
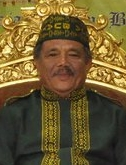

Mayor of Lutayan
- In office June 30, 2022 – June 30, 2025
- Preceded by: Raden Sakaluran
- Succeeded by: Yassin Mangudadatu

Member of the Philippine House of Representatives from Sultan Kudarat's First District
- In office June 30, 2007 – June 30, 2010
- Preceded by: Suharto Mangudadatu
- Succeeded by: Raden Sakaluran

Governor of Sultan Kudarat
- In office June 30, 2016 – June 30, 2019
- Vice Governor: Raden Sakaluran
- Preceded by: Suharto Mangudadatu
- Succeeded by: Suharto Mangudadatu
- In office June 30, 1998 – June 30, 2007
- Vice Governor: Miguel Domingo Jacalan III (1998–2004); Donato Ligo (2004–2007)
- Preceded by: Nesthur Gumana
- Succeeded by: Suharto Mangudadatu

Personal details
- Born: Buluan, Cotabato, Philippines
- Party: Lakas (2004–present); PTM (local party; 2016–present)
- Other political affiliations: KAMPI (2001–2008)

Pakung S. Mangudadatu is a Filipino politician who served as provincial governor of Sultan Kudarat from 2016 to 2019. He also served the same post from 1998 to 2007 and was elected Representative of the 1st district of Sultan Kudarat with Tacurong under the administration's Kabalikat ng Malayang Pilipino (Kampi) party in 2007. He ran for Mayor in Lutayan, Sultan Kudarat this 2022 with his grandson, Prince Raden Mangudadatu Sakaluran running for Vice Mayor.

== Early life and education ==
He was born in Buluan in the Empire Province of Cotabato (now part of Maguindanao del Sur). He is the son of Bai Ginandangan Ginabpal and Datu Buto Mangudadatu - the descendant of Sultan Tambilawan, the Brother of Datu Ali and Datu Djimbangan of Rajah Buayan.

He attended the Buluan Elementary School until his graduation in 1964. For his secondary studies, Mangudadatu attended Tacurong Academy in Tacurong and graduated in 1964. He pursued a bachelor of science degree on criminology at the Harvardian University in Davao City and obtained his degree in 1967.

== Political career ==
He was the elected municipal mayor of Lutayan from 2022 to 2025.

He run as Provincial Governor of Sultan Kudarat in 1998. During his campaign for governor, he and Rep. Angelo Montilla created the SK UNA political party. He defeated Sultan Kudarat Vice Gov. Rose Jamison for governor of the province and making history as the first Muslim governor of the Christian-dominated province. He served as provincial governor for nine years from 1998-2007 due to his tangible achievements, sound abilities, proven good governance and strong political will in the Province of Sultan Kudarat. He was then called as the "Action Man" because he is a man of action and not a man words.

On May 14, 2007, he was elected as representative of the first district of the province over his rival Angelo Montilla. Again, he made history for being the first representative of the first district of the province; While his son, Suharto Mangudadatu, succeeded him as provincial governor.

He decided to forego re-election in the 2010 elections to make a run for the gubernatorial post of the Autonomous Region in Muslim Mindanao (ARMM) but withdrew his plans after ARMM election was reset by Congress to go with the 2013 local and national mid-term elections.

After a six-year break from politics, he was again elected as the governor of the Christian-dominated Province of Sultan Kudarat in May 2016

In 2017, Mangudadatu was appointed the new chairperson of the Regional Peace and Order Council (RPOC) in Region XII. The appointment was issued by the Office of President Rodrigo Duterte.
