= Mariam Mangudadatu =

Filipino politician (born 1973)

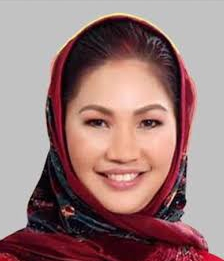

Governor of Maguindanao del Sur
- In office October 13, 2022 (Note: Acting until April 5, 2023 which was unrecognized by the Philippine national and Bangsamoro regional governments; Appointed as Officer in Charge (OIC) by the national government on April 5, 2023; OIC status unrecognized by Mangudadatu until April 28, 2023) – June 30, 2025
- Vice Governor: Nathaniel Midtimbang
- Preceded by: Position established
- Succeeded by: Ali Midtimbang

11th Governor of Maguindanao
- In office June 30, 2019 – October 13, 2022; Hold-over capacity from September 17, 2022 (Note: Maguindanao was abolished following the 2022 plebiscite on September 17, 2022 to divide it into Maguindanao del Sur and Maguindanao del Norte. However Mangudadatu continued to exercise the position until the officials for both provinces including the governor were determined.)
- Vice Governor: Lester Sinsuat (2019–2022); Bai Ainee Sinsuat (2022)
- Preceded by: Esmael Mangudadatu
- Succeeded by: Position abolished

Personal details
- Born: Mariam Sangki; April 11, 1973 (age 53) Sampaloc, Manila, Philippines
- Party: Nacionalista (2021–present)
- Other political affiliations: PDP–Laban (2016–2021); Independent (2015–2016); PMP (2012–2015)
- Spouse: Suharto Mangudadatu
- Occupation: Politician

Mariam Sangki-Mangudadatu (born April 11, 1973) is a Filipina politician who has been the chief executive of Maguindanao del Sur since its division from Maguindanao in 2022. Her position is currently disputed as her assumption as acting governor remains unrecognized by the Bangsamoro and national governments, the latter of which recognizes her only as the officer in charge of the province. Previously, she was the 11th and the only female governor of Maguindanao, serving from 2019 to 2023.

== Political career ==
Sangki-Mangudadatu first entered politics in 2013 when she won as mayor of Datu Abdullah Sangki in Maguindanao. Her opponent was Samsodhen Ampatuan-Sangki, a member of the Ampatuan clan. She successfully won reelection in 2016. In the 2019 general election, she ran as governor of Maguindanao where she eventually won becoming the first female governor of the province.

=== Governor of Maguindanao del Sur ===
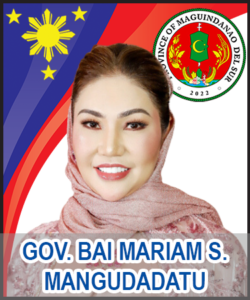
Official portrait as governor

The former Maguindanao province was dissolved into two new provinces on January 9, 2023 following the September 17, 2022 Maguindanao division plebiscite, and she was supposed to become acting governor of the new Maguindanao del Sur province. However this was uncertain, since the relevant provision presumes that the plebiscite would be held before the May 2022 national elections but the division vote was postponed after that date. She assumed the position and took her oath as governor of the new province on October 13.

She was named Officer in Charge (OIC) of the province on April 5, 2023, by President Bongbong Marcos in an attempt to resolve the uncertainty of leadership in the province. She opposed the appointment as OIC, believing she has the mandate to be acting governor as per the province's charter law. However, she took oath as OIC of the province on April 28, 2023.

== Personal life ==
Sangki-Mangudadatu is married to Suharto Mangudadatu and they have three children, including Pax Ali.
