= Suharto Mangudadatu =

Filipino politician (born 1969)

The Honorable Suharto Mangudadatu Ph.D.
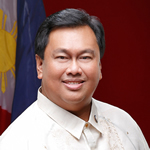
- Official portrait, 2016

Director General of the Technical Education and Skills Development Authority
- In office June 6, 2023 – July 31, 2024
- President: Bongbong Marcos
- Preceded by: Danilo Cruz
- Succeeded by: Jose Francisco Benitez

Governor of Sultan Kudarat
- In office June 30, 2019 – June 30, 2022
- Vice Governor: Ramon Abalos (June–November 2019); Jose Remos Segura (2019–2022)
- Preceded by: Pax Mangudadatu
- Succeeded by: Pax Ali Mangudadatu
- In office June 30, 2007 – June 30, 2016
- Vice Governor: Donato Ligo (2007–2010); Ernesto Matias (2010–2016)
- Preceded by: Pax Mangudadatu
- Succeeded by: Pax Mangudadatu

Member of the Philippine House of Representatives from Sultan Kudarat's First District
- In office June 30, 2016 – June 30, 2019
- Preceded by: Raden Sakaluran
- Succeeded by: Rihan Sakaluran

Member of the Philippine House of Representatives from Sultan Kudarat's Lone District
- In office June 30, 2004 – June 30, 2007
- Preceded by: Angelo Montilla
- Succeeded by: District abolished

Personal details
- Born: January 17, 1969 (age 57) Tacurong, Sultan Kudarat, Philippines
- Party: NUP (2016–present); Al Ittihad–UKB (local party)
- Other political affiliations: Independent (2013–2016); Lakas–CMD (2008–2013); KAMPI (until 2008)
- Spouse: Mariam Mangudadatu

Suharto "Teng" Tan Mangudadatu (born January 17, 1969) is a Filipino politician from the province of Sultan Kudarat in the Philippines. He previously served as Governor of Sultan Kudarat from 2007 to 2016, and again from 2019 to 2022.

He is the son of Pax Mangudadatu and Chiong Hai Mangudadatu and husband of Mariam Mangudadatu. On June 6, 2023, He was appointed by President Bongbong Marcos as the new Director General of the Technical Education and Skills Development Authority.
