= Governor of Maguindanao =

Local chief executive

Provincial Governor of Maguindanao
- Appointer: Elected via popular vote
- Term length: 3 years
- Formation: November 22, 1973
- First holder: Simeon Datumanong
- Final holder: Mariam Mangudadatu
- Abolished: January 9, 2023

The governor of Maguindanao (Maguindanaon: Mapulu na dairat sa Magindanaw; Filipino: Punong panlalawigan sa Maguindanao), was the chief executive of the provincial government of Maguindanao. The position was abolished in 2023, when the province was split into Maguindanao del Norte and Maguindanao del Sur.

== List ==
#	Image	Governor	Term
1		Simeon Datumanong	1973–1975
2		Zacaria Candao	1975–1977
3		Datu Sanggacala Baraguir	1977–1980
4		Sandiale A. Sambolawan	1980–1986
(2)		Zacaria Candao	1986–1990
5		Norodin Matalam	1990–1995
(2)		Zacaria Candao	1995–2001
6		Andal Ampatuan Sr.	2001–2008
7		Sajid Ampatuan	2008–2009
8		Nariman Ambolodto	2009–2010
9		Gani Biruar	2010
10		Esmael G. Mangudadatu	2010–2019
11		Mariam Mangudadatu	2019–2023

Mariam Mangudadatu, the last governor of Maguindanao, continued as the governor of Maguindanao del Sur.
