= Governor of Sultan Kudarat =

Local chief executive

Provincial Governor of Sultan Kudarat
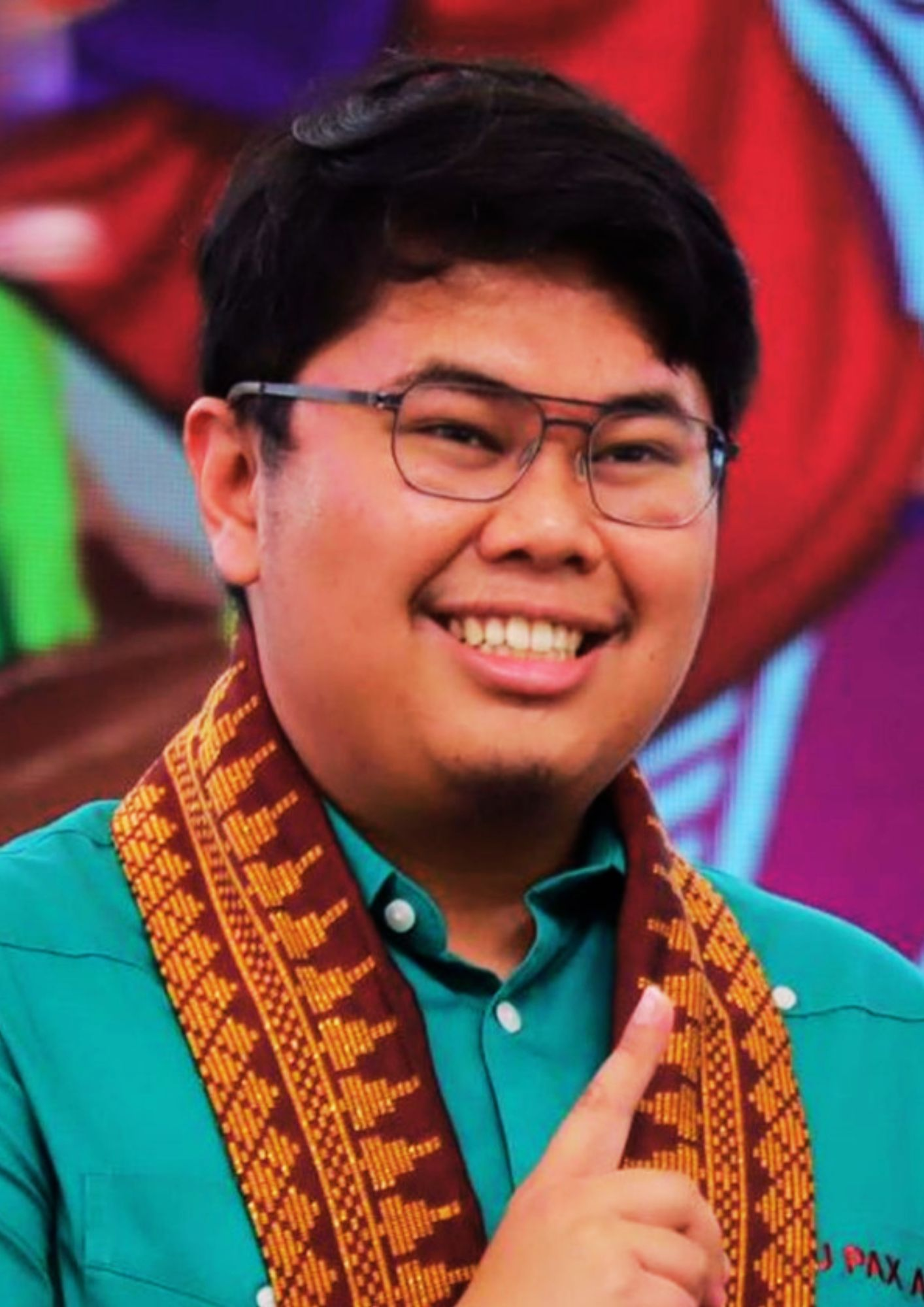
- Incumbent; Pax Ali Mangudadatu since June 30, 2022
- Appointer: Elected via popular vote
- Term length: 3 years
- Inaugural holder: Carlos Cajelo
- Formation: 1973

The governor of Sultan Kudarat (Filipino: Punong Panlalawigan ng Sultan Kudarat) is the chief executive of the provincial government of Sultan Kudarat.

== Provincial Governors (1973–present) ==
	Governor	Term
1	Carlos B. Cajelo	1973–1974
2	Gonzalo H. Siongco	1974–1975
3	Conrado E. Buencamino	1975
4	Benjamin C. Duque	1975–1984
5	Aurelio C. Freires, Jr.	1984–1986
6	Perfecto C. Bautista	1986–1987
7	Fidel A. Fortez	1987
8	Exequiel S. Mayordomo	1987–1988
9	Nesthur R. Gumana	1988–1998
10	Rosila P. Jamison	1998
11	Pax Mangudadatu	1998–2007
12	Suharto Mangudadatu	2007–2016
13	Pax Mangudadatu	2016–2019
14	Suharto Mangudadatu	2019–2022
15	Pax Ali Mangudadatu	2022–
