= Talayan =

Municipality in Maguindanao del Sur, Philippines

- Municipality
- Municipality of Talayan
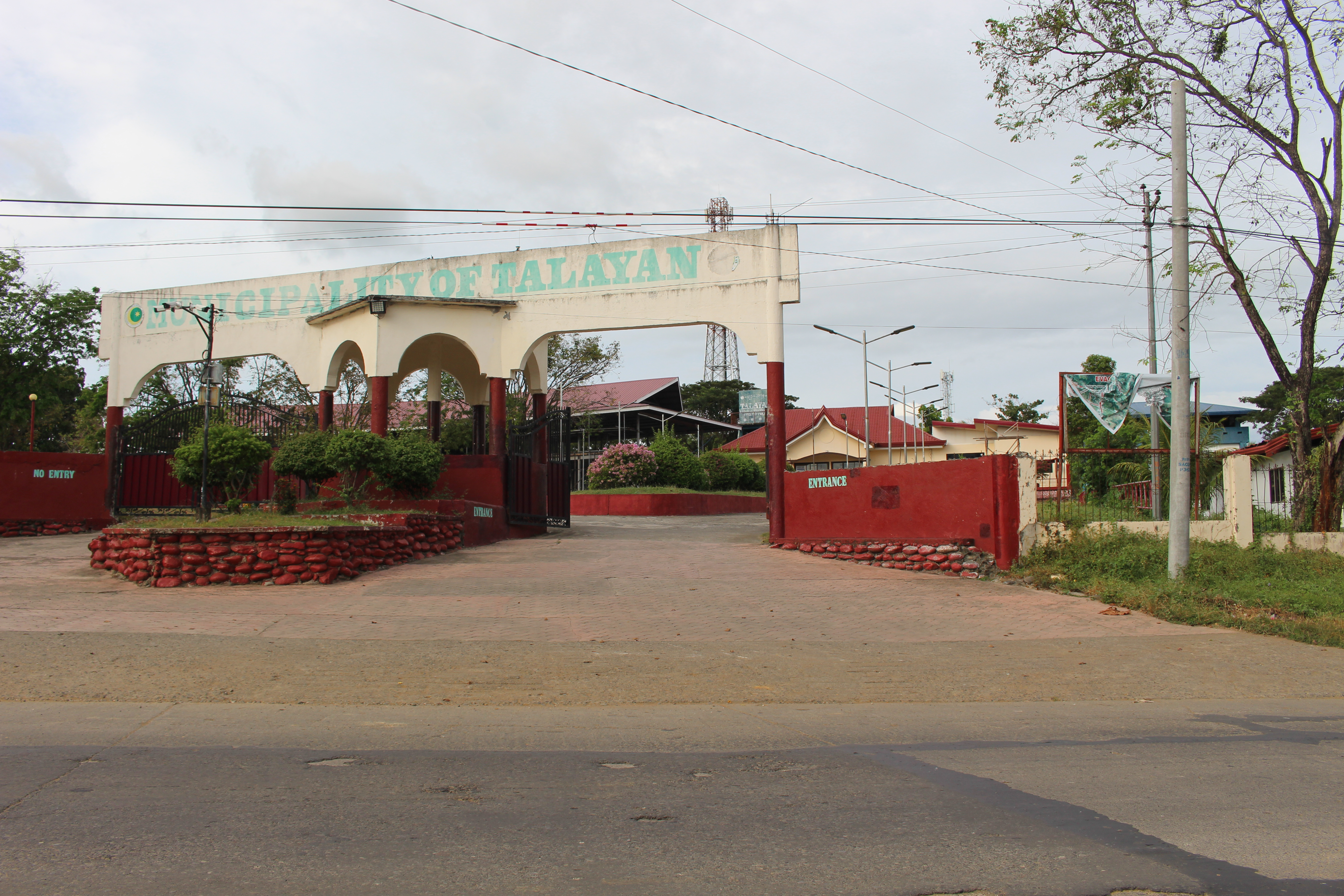
- Municipal Compound

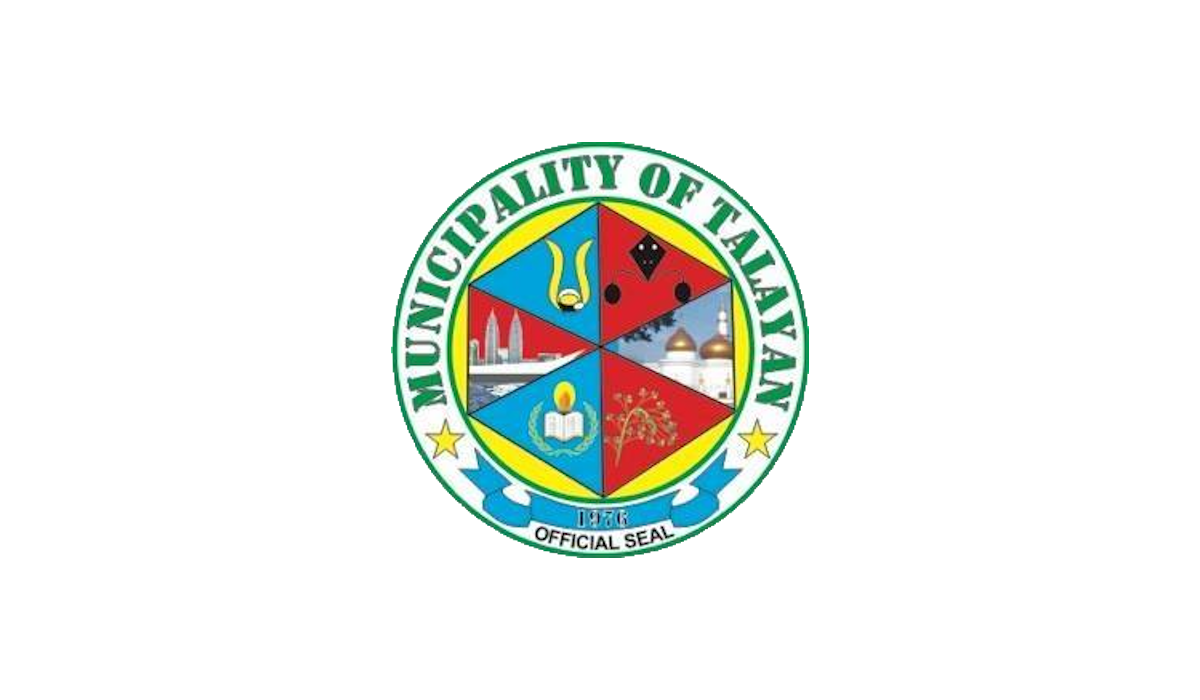
- Flag Seal

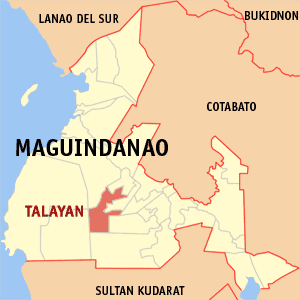
- Map of Maguindanao del Sur with Talayan highlighted
- Interactive map of Talayan
- Location within the Philippines
- Coordinates: 6°59′04″N 124°21′23″E
- Country: Philippines
- Region: Bangsamoro Autonomous Region in Muslim Mindanao
- Province: Maguindanao del Sur
- House district: Lone district
- Parliamentary district: 1st district
- Founded: September 22, 1976
- Barangays: 15 (see Barangays)

Government
  - Type: Sangguniang Bayan
  - Mayor: Tungkang A. Midtimbang
  - Vice Mayor: Datu Ali S. Midtimbang Jr.
  - House Representative: Mohamad P. Paglas Sr.
  - Municipal Council: Members: Ali M. Midtimbang; Seven P. Midtimbang; Mangundatu U. Midtimbang; Samuel K. Midtimbang; Nasser B. Midtimbang; Toto D. Manguda; Arnel O. Kasim; Muhalidin G. Kasim
  - Electorate: 18,561 voters (2025)

Area
  - Total: 143.84 km^{2} (55.54 sq mi)
- Elevation: 34 m (112 ft)
- Highest elevation: 179 m (587 ft)
- Lowest elevation: 3 m (9.8 ft)

Population (2024 census)
  - Total: 43,301
  - Density: 301.04/km^{2} (779.68/sq mi)
  - Households: 5,400

Economy
  - Income class: 3rd municipal income class
  - Poverty incidence: 53.36% (2023)
  - Revenue: ₱ 143.4 million (2024)
  - Assets: ₱ 393.7 million (2024)
  - Expenditure: ₱ 194.6 million (2024)
  - Liabilities: ₱ 137.2 million (2024)

Service provider
  - Electricity: Maguindanao Electric Cooperative (MAGELCO)
- Time zone: UTC+8 (PST)
- ZIP code: 9612
- PSGC: 1903816000
- IDD : area code: +63 (0)64
- Native languages: Maguindanao; Tagalog
- Website: www.talayan.gov.ph

Talayan, officially the Municipality of Talayan (Maguindanaon: Ingud nu Talayan; Iranun: Inged a Talayan; Tagalog: Bayan ng Talayan), is a municipality in the province of Maguindanao del Sur, Philippines. According to the 2024 census, it had a population of 43,301.

Talayan was created through Presidential Decree No. 1009 by then President Ferdinand Marcos on September 22, 1976. It was carved from the municipalities of Datu Piang and Dinaig (now Datu Odin Sinsuat).

Datu Udzag Midtimbang was the first appointed mayor of entire Talayan now divided into 4 municipalities, Talitay, Datu Anggal Midtimbang, Talayan and Guindulungan. followed by a younger brother Datu Antao, and now Datu Ali. With these leaders, Talayan now and then remains as a place for everybody. Many projects now serve the public like concrete roads and lights in every home. A new public market is now being constructed under the leadership of Mayor Hadji Datu Ali.

== Geography ==
=== Barangays ===
Talayan is politically subdivided into 15 barangays. Each barangay consists of puroks while some have sitios.

- Boboguiron
- Damablac
- Fugotan
- Fukol
- Katibpuan
- Kedati
- Lanting
- Linamunan
- Marader
- Binangga North
- Binangga South
- Talayan
- Tamar
- Tambunan I
- Timbaluan

=== Climate ===
Climate data for Talayan, Maguindanao del Sur
Month	Jan	Feb	Mar	Apr	May	Jun	Jul	Aug	Sep	Oct	Nov	Dec	Year
Mean daily maximum °C (°F)	31 (88)	32 (90)	32 (90)	32 (90)	31 (88)	29 (84)	29 (84)	29 (84)	30 (86)	30 (86)	30 (86)	31 (88)	31 (87)
Mean daily minimum °C (°F)	21 (70)	21 (70)	21 (70)	23 (73)	23 (73)	23 (73)	23 (73)	23 (73)	23 (73)	23 (73)	23 (73)	22 (72)	22 (72)
Average precipitation mm (inches)	30 (1.2)	19 (0.7)	25 (1.0)	24 (0.9)	64 (2.5)	88 (3.5)	102 (4.0)	105 (4.1)	76 (3.0)	82 (3.2)	60 (2.4)	26 (1.0)	701 (27.5)
Average rainy days	9.8	8.5	11.3	11.9	21.6	23.9	24.1	24.5	20.9	21.8	16.8	11.8	206.9
Source: Meteoblue (modeled/calculated data, not measured locally)

== Demographics ==
Population census of Talayan
Year	Pop.	±% p.a.
1980	18,130	—
1990	42,327	+8.85%
1995	43,286	+0.42%
2000	33,129	−5.57%
2007	25,753	−3.41%
2010	16,042	−15.82%
2015	30,032	+12.68%
2020	34,156	+2.75%
2024	43,301	+5.86%
Source: Philippine Statistics Authority

== Economy ==
Poverty Incidence of Talayan

Source: Philippine Statistics Authority
