= Maguindanao's 2nd congressional district =

District in the Philippines

- Former constituency for the House of Representatives of the Philippines
- Location of Maguindanao within the Philippines
- Province: Maguindanao
- Region: Bangsamoro
- Population: 651,896 (2015)
- Electorate: 454,622 (2022)
- Major settlements: 25 LGUs: Municipalities; Ampatuan; Buluan; Datu Abdullah Sangki; Datu Anggal Midtimbang; Datu Hoffer Ampatuan; Datu Montawal; Datu Paglas; Datu Piang; Datu Salibo; Datu Saudi Ampatuan; Datu Unsay; General Salipada K. Pendatun; Guindulungan; Mamasapano; Mangudadatu; Pagalungan; Paglat; Pandag; Rajah Buayan; Shariff Aguak; Shariff Saydona Mustapha; South Upi; Sultan sa Barongis; Talayan; Talitay
- Area: 4,728.90 km^{2} (1,825.84 sq mi)

Former constituency
- Created: 1987
- Abolished: 2022

Maguindanao's 2nd congressional district was one of the two congressional districts of the Philippines in the province of undivided Maguindanao. It was represented in the House of Representatives from 1987–2022. The district covered 25 interior municipalities of eastern Maguindanao bordering the provinces of Cotabato and Sultan Kudarat, including its capital Buluan. From 2006 to 2008, the district was briefly replaced by the lone district of Maguindanao after a new province was carved out of the 1st district known as Shariff Kabunsuan which was eventually nullified by the Supreme Court. It was last represented in the 19th Congress by Mohamad P. Paglas of the Nacionalista Party (NP), who was later redistricted to the at-large district of the newly-established province of Maguindanao del Sur.

== Representation history ==
#	Image	Member	Term of office		Congress	Party	Electoral history	Constituent LGUs
#	Image	Member	Start	End	Congress	Party	Electoral history	Constituent LGUs
=== Maguindanao's 2nd district for the House of Representatives of the Philippines ===
District created February 2, 1987 from Maguindanao's at-large district.
1		Guimid Matalam	June 30, 1987	June 30, 1992	8th	PDP–Laban	Elected in 1987.	1987–1991; Ampatuan, Buluan, Datu Paglas, Datu Piang, Maganoy, Pagalungan, South Upi, Sultan sa Barongis, Talayan
1		Guimid Matalam	June 30, 1987	June 30, 1992	8th	Lakas/UMDP	Elected in 1987.	1991–1998; Ampatuan, Buluan, Datu Paglas, Datu Piang, General Salipada K. Pendatun, Maganoy, Pagalungan, South Upi, Sultan sa Barongis, Talayan
2		Simeon Datumanong	June 30, 1992	January 20, 2001	9th	LDP (Nacionalista)	Elected in 1992.	1991–1998; Ampatuan, Buluan, Datu Paglas, Datu Piang, General Salipada K. Pendatun, Maganoy, Pagalungan, South Upi, Sultan sa Barongis, Talayan
2		Simeon Datumanong	June 30, 1992	January 20, 2001	10th	Lakas	Re-elected in 1995.	1991–1998; Ampatuan, Buluan, Datu Paglas, Datu Piang, General Salipada K. Pendatun, Maganoy, Pagalungan, South Upi, Sultan sa Barongis, Talayan
2		Simeon Datumanong	June 30, 1992	January 20, 2001	11th	Lakas	Re-elected in 1998. Resigned on appointment as Secretary of Public Works and Highways.	1998–2001; Ampatuan, Buluan, Datu Paglas, Datu Piang, General Salipada K. Pendatun, Pagalungan, Shariff Aguak, South Upi, Sultan sa Barongis, Talayan, Talitay
—	vacant		January 20, 2001	June 30, 2001	11th	–	No special election held to fill vacancy.	1998–2001; Ampatuan, Buluan, Datu Paglas, Datu Piang, General Salipada K. Pendatun, Pagalungan, Shariff Aguak, South Upi, Sultan sa Barongis, Talayan, Talitay
(1)		Guimid Matalam	June 30, 2001	June 30, 2004	12th	Lakas	Elected in 2001.	2001–2004; Ampatuan, Buluan, Datu Paglas, Datu Piang, General Salipada K. Pendatun, Mamasapano, Pagagawan, Pagalungan, Paglat, Shariff Aguak, South Upi, Sultan sa Barongis, Talayan, Talitay
(2)		Simeon Datumanong	June 30, 2004	June 30, 2007	13th	Lakas	Elected in 2004. Redistricted to the at-large district.	2004–2007; Ampatuan, Buluan, Datu Abdullah Sangki, Datu Montawal, Datu Paglas, Datu Piang, Datu Saudi Ampatuan, Datu Unsay, General Salipada K. Pendatun, Guindulungan, Mamasapano, Pagalungan, Paglat, Shariff Aguak, South Upi, Sultan sa Barongis, Talayan, Talitay
District dissolved into Maguindanao's at-large congressional district.
District re-created July 16, 2008.
(2)		Simeon Datumanong	July 16, 2008	June 30, 2013	14th	Lakas	Redistricted from the at-large district.	2008–2022; Ampatuan, Buluan, Datu Abdullah Sangki, Datu Anggal Midtimbang, Datu Hoffer Ampatuan, Datu Montawal, Datu Paglas, Datu Piang, Datu Salibo, Datu Saudi Ampatuan, Datu Unsay, General Salipada K. Pendatun, Guindulungan, Mamasapano, Mangudadatu, Pagalungan, Paglat, Pandag, Rajah Buayan, Shariff Aguak, Shariff Saydona Mustapha, South Upi, Sultan sa Barongis, Talayan, Talitay
(2)		Simeon Datumanong	July 16, 2008	June 30, 2013	15th	Lakas	Re-elected in 2010.	2008–2022; Ampatuan, Buluan, Datu Abdullah Sangki, Datu Anggal Midtimbang, Datu Hoffer Ampatuan, Datu Montawal, Datu Paglas, Datu Piang, Datu Salibo, Datu Saudi Ampatuan, Datu Unsay, General Salipada K. Pendatun, Guindulungan, Mamasapano, Mangudadatu, Pagalungan, Paglat, Pandag, Rajah Buayan, Shariff Aguak, Shariff Saydona Mustapha, South Upi, Sultan sa Barongis, Talayan, Talitay
3		Zajid G. Mangudadatu	June 30, 2013	June 30, 2019	16th	Liberal	Elected in 2013.	2008–2022; Ampatuan, Buluan, Datu Abdullah Sangki, Datu Anggal Midtimbang, Datu Hoffer Ampatuan, Datu Montawal, Datu Paglas, Datu Piang, Datu Salibo, Datu Saudi Ampatuan, Datu Unsay, General Salipada K. Pendatun, Guindulungan, Mamasapano, Mangudadatu, Pagalungan, Paglat, Pandag, Rajah Buayan, Shariff Aguak, Shariff Saydona Mustapha, South Upi, Sultan sa Barongis, Talayan, Talitay
3		Zajid G. Mangudadatu	June 30, 2013	June 30, 2019	17th	PDP–Laban	Re-elected in 2016.	2008–2022; Ampatuan, Buluan, Datu Abdullah Sangki, Datu Anggal Midtimbang, Datu Hoffer Ampatuan, Datu Montawal, Datu Paglas, Datu Piang, Datu Salibo, Datu Saudi Ampatuan, Datu Unsay, General Salipada K. Pendatun, Guindulungan, Mamasapano, Mangudadatu, Pagalungan, Paglat, Pandag, Rajah Buayan, Shariff Aguak, Shariff Saydona Mustapha, South Upi, Sultan sa Barongis, Talayan, Talitay
4		Esmael Mangudadatu	June 30, 2019	June 30, 2022	18th	PDP–Laban	Elected in 2019.	2008–2022; Ampatuan, Buluan, Datu Abdullah Sangki, Datu Anggal Midtimbang, Datu Hoffer Ampatuan, Datu Montawal, Datu Paglas, Datu Piang, Datu Salibo, Datu Saudi Ampatuan, Datu Unsay, General Salipada K. Pendatun, Guindulungan, Mamasapano, Mangudadatu, Pagalungan, Paglat, Pandag, Rajah Buayan, Shariff Aguak, Shariff Saydona Mustapha, South Upi, Sultan sa Barongis, Talayan, Talitay
4		Esmael Mangudadatu	June 30, 2019	June 30, 2022	18th	UBJP	Elected in 2019.	2008–2022; Ampatuan, Buluan, Datu Abdullah Sangki, Datu Anggal Midtimbang, Datu Hoffer Ampatuan, Datu Montawal, Datu Paglas, Datu Piang, Datu Salibo, Datu Saudi Ampatuan, Datu Unsay, General Salipada K. Pendatun, Guindulungan, Mamasapano, Mangudadatu, Pagalungan, Paglat, Pandag, Rajah Buayan, Shariff Aguak, Shariff Saydona Mustapha, South Upi, Sultan sa Barongis, Talayan, Talitay
5		Mohamad P. Paglas	June 30, 2022	September 18, 2022	19th	Nacionalista	Elected in 2022. Redistricted to Maguindanao del Sur's at-large district.	2008–2022; Ampatuan, Buluan, Datu Abdullah Sangki, Datu Anggal Midtimbang, Datu Hoffer Ampatuan, Datu Montawal, Datu Paglas, Datu Piang, Datu Salibo, Datu Saudi Ampatuan, Datu Unsay, General Salipada K. Pendatun, Guindulungan, Mamasapano, Mangudadatu, Pagalungan, Paglat, Pandag, Rajah Buayan, Shariff Aguak, Shariff Saydona Mustapha, South Upi, Sultan sa Barongis, Talayan, Talitay
District dissolved into Maguindanao del Sur's at-large congressional district.

== See also ==
- Legislative districts of Maguindanao
- Maguindanao del Sur's at-large congressional district
