= Maguindanao =

Philippine province (1973–2023)

Maguindanao مَڬِنْدَنَوْ
- Province of the Philippines
- Flag Seal

- Location in the Philippines
- Capital: Shariff Aguak (first); Buluan (last)
- Area
  - Coordinates: 07°08′N 124°18′E
  - 2016: 4,871.6 km^{2} (1,880.9 sq mi)
- Population
  - 2020: 1,667,258
- Government
- Governor
  - 1973–1975: Simeon Datumanong (first)
  - 2019–2023: Bai Mariam Mangudadatu (last)
- History
  - Established: November 22, 1973
  - Division plebiscite: September 17, 2022
  - End of transition period and disestablishment: January 9, 2023
- Contained within
  - Region: Central Mindanao (1973–1989); Autonomous Region in Muslim Mindanao (1989–2019); Bangsamoro Autonomous Region in Muslim Mindanao (2019–2023)
- Subdivisions
  - Type: LGUs
  - Units: 37 Municipalities and City (including Cotabato City); 508 barangays
| Preceded by | Succeeded by |
| Cotabato | Maguindanao del Norte; Maguindanao del Sur |

Maguindanao (locally [maˈɡindɐnaʊ, -ginˈdanaʊ]; Maguindanaon: Dairat nu Magindanaw; Iranun: Perobinsia a Magindanao; Filipino: Lalawigan ng Maguindanao) was a province of the Philippines located in the Bangsamoro Autonomous Region in Muslim Mindanao (BARMM). From 2014 to 2023, its provincial capital was Buluan, but the legislative branch of government, the Maguindanao Provincial Board, convened at the old provincial capitol in Sultan Kudarat. It bordered Lanao del Sur to the north, Cotabato to the east, Sultan Kudarat to the south, and Illana Bay to the west.

It is now used collectively to refer to the provinces of Maguindanao del Sur and Maguindanao del Norte, with which it was replaced with since January 9, 2023 after a division of the province was approved in a plebiscite on September 18, 2022 .

== History ==
=== Maguindanao Sultanate ===
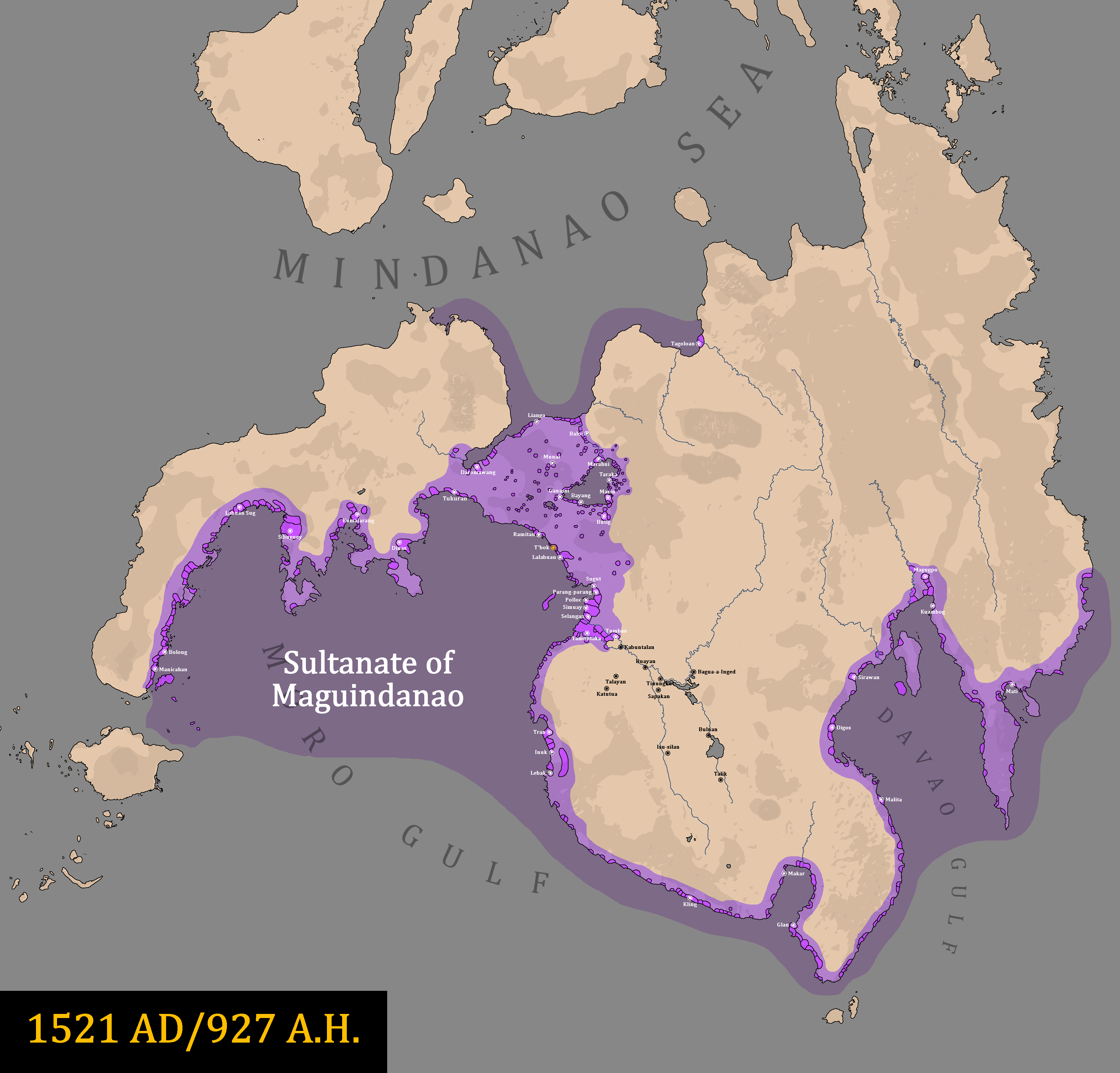
The map of the Sultanate of Maguindanao in 1521, at its largest extent.

According to Maguindanao royal records, Sharif Muhammad Kabungsuwan of Johor introduced Islam to the Maguindanaos at the end of the 15th century. He subsequently married a Maranao princess of Malabang and established the Sultanate of Maguindanao.

Its capital of Kuta Watu (modern-day Cotabato) formed the sultanate's heartland but its influence extended from the Zamboanga Peninsula to Sarangani Bay and Davao.

In the 1660s, Dutch vessels from Ternate and Tidore often stopped by Maguindanao to purchase rice, beeswax and tobacco.

==== Spanish attacks ====
The Spanish frequently attacked the sultanate starting in the 1600s. In the middle of the 19th century, the Spanish were able to build a military post at what is now Barangay Tamontaka, Cotabato City.

=== American rule ===
The historical province of Cotabato covered the present area of Maguindanao. In 1903, the American colonial government established the Moro Province and made Cotabato as one of its districts. Upon the conversion of the Moro Province into the Department of Mindanao and Sulu in 1914, the districts were made into provinces.

=== World War II ===
In 1942, the Japanese forces first attacked what is now Maguindanao.

In 1945, Maguindanao was liberated by allied Philippine Commonwealth troops and Maguindanaon guerrilla units after defeating the Japanese Imperial forces in the Battle of Maguindanao during the Second World War.

=== Third Philippine Republic onwards ===
==== Reinstitution as a province ====
The territory of the old province of Cotabato was reduced in 1966 when several of its municipalities were separated from it and constituted into the newly created province of South Cotabato. In 1973, Cotabato was dissolved when it was split to create three new provinces: Maguindanao, (North) Cotabato and Sultan Kudarat.

Maguindanao was the only Muslim-majority province of the four created out of the original Cotabato Province. In 1989, majority of its voters opted to join the Autonomous Region in Muslim Mindanao but Cotabato City did not. Despite this, the city would later serve as the provisional capital of the Autonomous Region in Muslim Mindanao (ARMM) and host line agency offices for the province.

On August 23, 1992, 16 senior officers of the insurgent Communist Party of the Philippines-New People's Army (CPP-NPA) operating in the province were arrested by intelligence operatives of the Philippine National Police, with officials considering it to be a significant hit against the organization's progress in the region.

=== Shariff Kabunsuan creation and nullification ===
On October 31, 2006, Maguindanao voters approved the creation of a new province to be composed of 10 towns from the province. Of more than 500,000 voters registered, 285,372 favored the creation of the province, and 8,802 voted against it. The new province, Shariff Kabunsuan, established through Muslim Mindanao Autonomy Act No. 201 by the ARMM Regional Legislative Assembly, became the country's 80th province and the 6th in the ARMM. It was composed of the towns of Datu Odin Sinsuat, Kabuntalan, Upi, Sultan Kudarat, Datu Blah T. Sinsuat, Sultan Mastura, Parang, Buldon, Matanog and Barira. However, in July 2008, the Supreme Court, in an 8–6 vote, nullified the province's creation, restoring its municipalities to Maguindanao, ruling that "Only Congress can create provinces and cities because the creation of provinces and cities necessarily includes the creation of legislative districts".

=== 2009 election violence ===
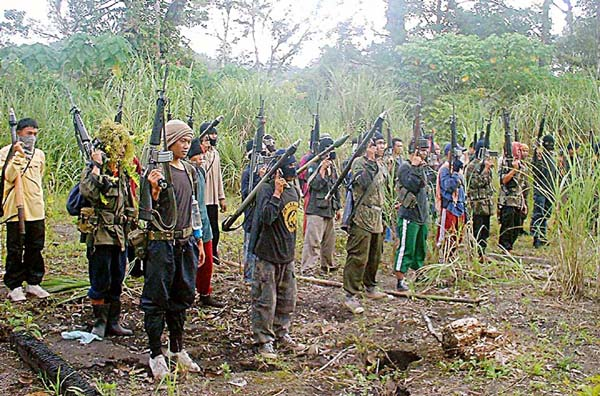
Maguindanao guerillas in 1999

On November 23, 2009, a 2010 gubernatorial election caravan supporting Esmael Mangudadatu, vice mayor of Buluan, was attacked. Fifty-seven people were killed, including Mangudadatu's wife and sisters, supporters, local journalists, and bystanders. On December 4, 2009, a number of homes belonging to the Ampatuan political family were raided in connection with the massacre.

President Gloria Macapagal Arroyo officially declared martial law in the province of Maguindanao on December 5, 2009, Saturday morning.

In a press conference past 7 am, Executive Secretary Eduardo Ermita announced Proclamation No. 1959 declaring a state of martial law and suspending the privilege of the writ of habeas corpus in the province of Maguindanao, except for certain areas identified as bailiwicks of the Moro Islamic Liberation Front (MILF) separatists.

The declaration of martial law led to the "arrests without warrants" of other members of the Ampatuan clan who have been linked to the November 23 massacre of 58 civilians.

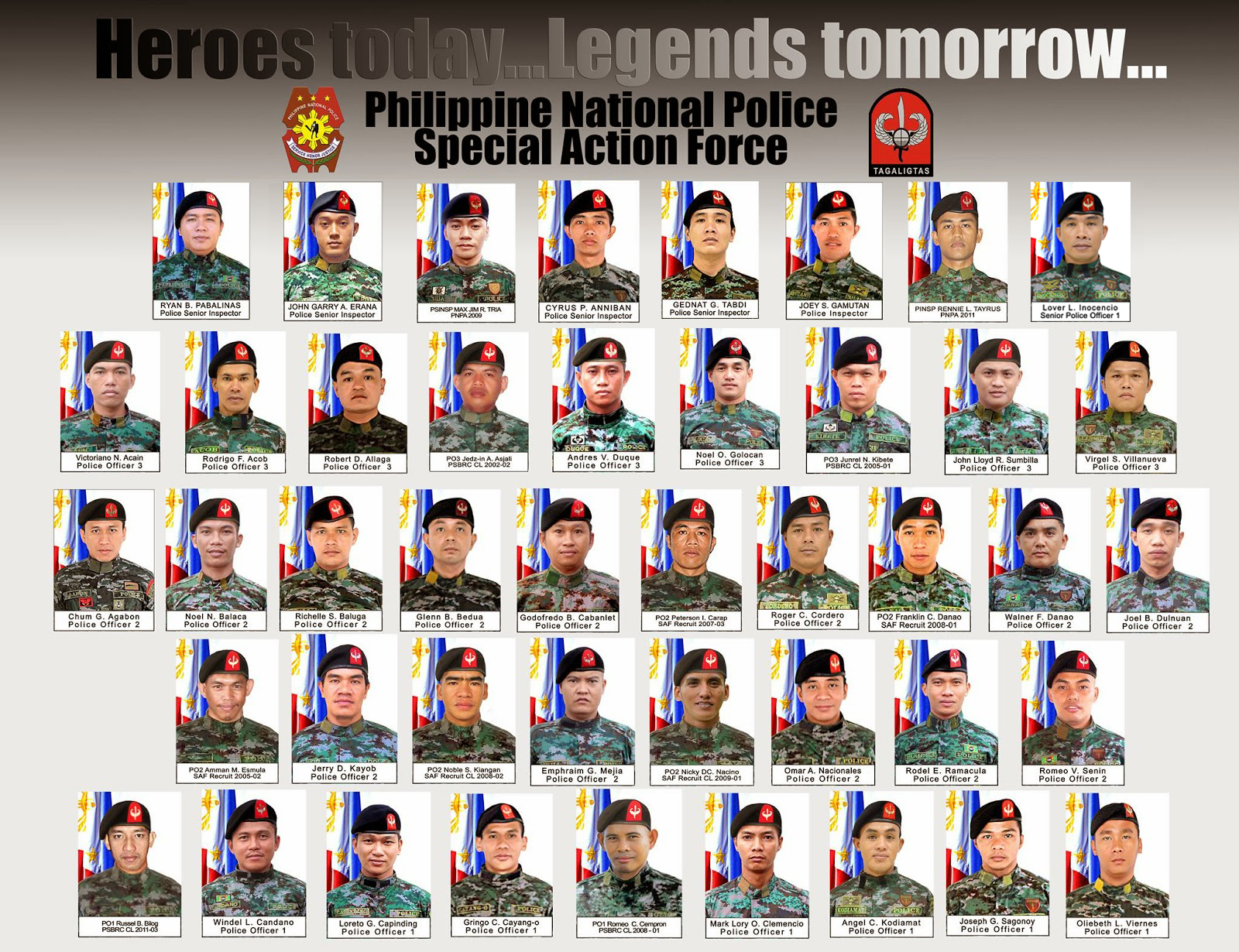
The 44 police officers who perished during the clash

On August 15, 2011, Mangudadatu and his convoy were ambushed as they were on their way to his birthday celebration.

=== Mamasapano clash ===
On January 25, 2015, 44 members of the Special Action Force were killed after they killed the Jemaah Islamiyah terrorist Zulkifli Abdhir a.k.a. Marwan, by allegedly Moro Islamic Liberation Front and Bangsamoro Islamic Freedom Fighters in Mamasapano.

=== 2016 El Niño ===
In February 2016, Maguindanao experienced the effects of the 2014–16 El Niño, causing destruction on rice and corn fields due to drought. The province declared a state of calamity in response to the damages caused.

=== Abolition and division ===
In the 17th Congress, then House Deputy Speaker Bai Sandra Sema (barred by law to run for another term in her current district in 2019) introduced a bill on March 2, 2017, seeking to establish a new province called Maguindanao North.

Later in the 18th Congress, two new House bills were filed: one by First District Rep. Datu Roonie Sinsuat Sr., Sema's successor, seeking the creation of Western Maguindanao; another by Second District Rep. Esmael Mangudadatu with same naming proposal as Sema. A substitute bill was later authored by both Maguindanao representatives along with Tarlac Third District Rep. Noel Villanueva, and approved in the final reading in 2020. In the Senate, three bills were also filed seeking for the same division with Sen. Bong Revilla pursuing instead the same naming proposal as Sinsuat. This time, those bills, except one by Revilla, would name the divided provinces as Northern Maguindanao and Southern Maguindanao.

In the substitute bill in the House, Northern Maguindanao will consist the municipalities that became part of Shariff Kabunsuan along with Talitay, and its designated provincial capital will be Datu Odin Sinsuat, while the capital of Southern Maguindanao will be Buluan. Both proposed provinces will comprise a lone legislative district. Prior to the final version, the municipalities of Datu Anggal Midtimbang (by Sema and Mangudadatu) and South Upi (by Sinsuat) were proposed to became part of Maguindanao North/Western Maguindanao; Sultan Kudarat was proposed by Mangudadatu to be the capital of the then-proposed province.

The proposed division was signed by Pres. Rodrigo Duterte on May 27, 2021, as Republic Act No. 11550, with new provinces to be named Maguindanao del Norte and Maguindanao del Sur (named as the mother province of Maguindanao). The original schedule of the plebiscite, to be supervised by the Commission on Elections (COMELEC), was in September 2021, ninety days after the effectivity of the law, but was postponed as the COMELEC was preparing for the 2022 general election.

RA No. 11550 was ratified on September 17, 2022, in a plebiscite, thus dividing Maguindanao on January 9, 2023. Among the province-wide plebiscites, it was the most participated in terms of number of registered and actual voters, with the voter turnout as the second highest, only behind that of the 1998 plebiscite creating and taking Compostela Valley from Davao del Norte. With that division, the number of provinces in the country has raised to 82.

A transition period would take place which lasted until January 9, 2023.

== Geography ==
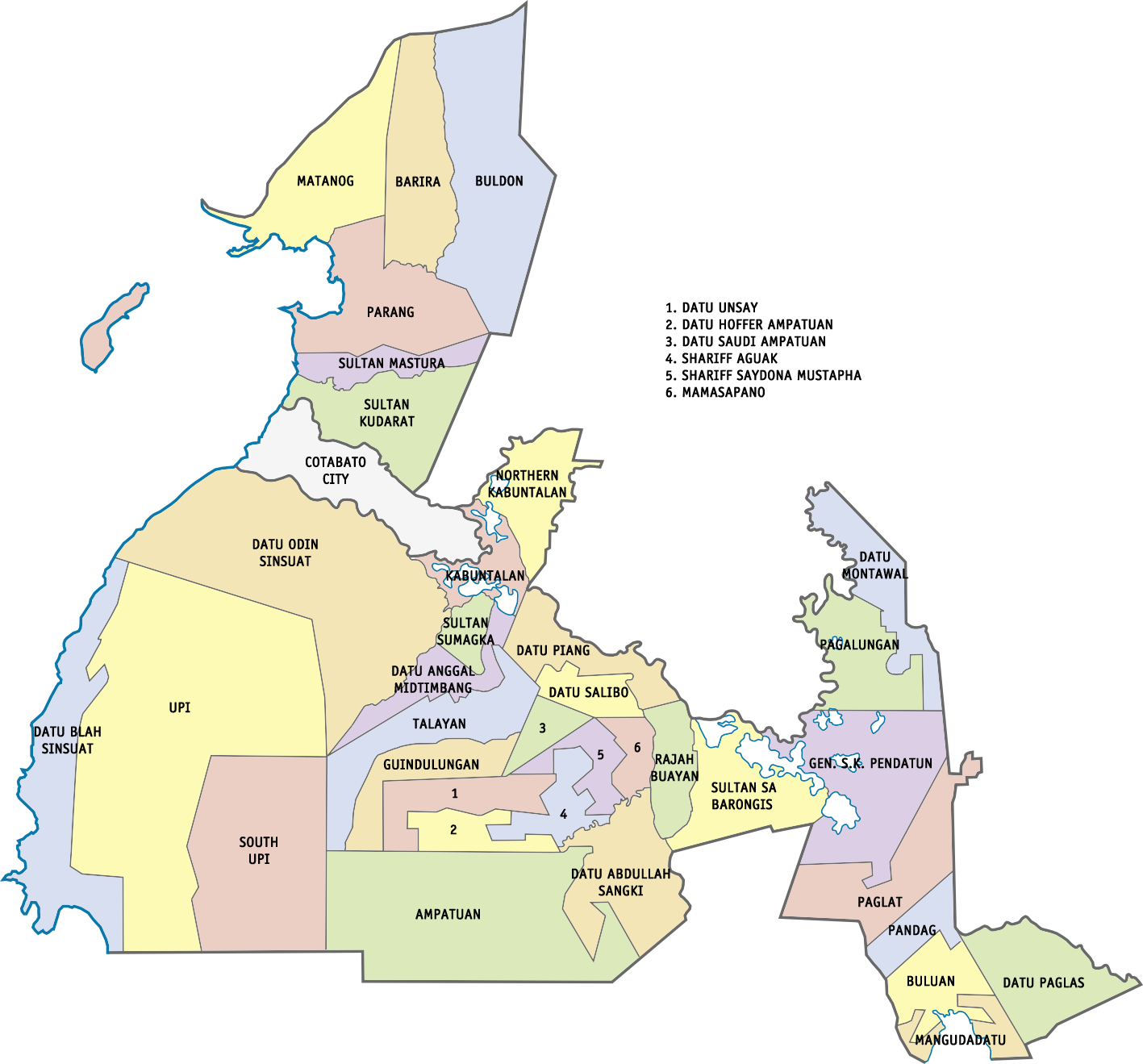

Maguindanao was situated in the central section of Mindanao, bordered by Lanao del Sur to the north, Cotabato to the east, Sultan Kudarat to the south, and Illana Bay to the west.

=== Administrative divisions ===
Maguindanao comprised 36 municipalities, further subdivided into 508 barangays. Cotabato City, although geographically grouped with Maguindanao, was administratively independent from the province.

The province was divided into two congressional districts. In October 2006, the first congressional district was split off into a new province, Shariff Kabunsuan. However, the ARMM's Act creating the province was nullified by the Supreme Court in July 2008, on the basis that creation of a province is a function of the Philippine legislature. The area since reverted to the province of Maguindanao.

- † Capital municipality
- Municipality
- ∗∗ Independent component city (only geographically grouped with the province)

| City or municipality | | District | Population | | | ±% p.a. | Area | | Density | | Barangay | Coordinates^{[A]} |
| | | | (2015) | | (2010) | | km^{2} | sq mi | /km^{2} | /sq mi | | |
|---|---|---|---|---|---|---|---|---|---|---|---|---|
| Ampatuan | | 2nd | 2.1% | 24,801 | 17,800 | 6.52% | 255.40 | 98.61 | 97 | 250 | 11 | 6°49′58″N 124°27′34″E |
| Barira | | 1st | 2.6% | 30,004 | 19,686 | 8.35% | 392.61 | 151.59 | 76 | 200 | 14 | 7°28′15″N 124°21′23″E |
| Buldon | | 1st | 3.0% | 35,282 | 33,729 | 0.86% | 429.40 | 165.79 | 82 | 210 | 15 | 7°30′33″N 124°22′17″E |
| Buluan | † | 2nd | 4.3% | 50,008 | 38,106 | 5.31% | 699.50 | 270.08 | 71 | 180 | 7 | 6°43′09″N 124°47′32″E |
| Cotabato City | ∗∗ | Lone | — | 299,438 | 271,786 | 1.86% | 176.00 | 67.95 | 1,700 | 4,400 | 37 | 7°13′15″N 124°14′48″E |
| Datu Abdullah Sangki | | 2nd | 2.0% | 23,878 | 17,079 | 6.59% | 220.00 | 84.94 | 110 | 280 | 10 | 6°46′43″N 124°28′36″E |
| Datu Anggal Midtimbang | | 2nd | 2.1% | 25,016 | 13,339 | 12.72% | 85.43 | 32.98 | 290 | 750 | 7 | 7°00′35″N 124°19′40″E |
| Datu Blah T. Sinsuat | | 1st | 2.1% | 25,024 | 16,533 | 8.21% | 147.21 | 56.84 | 170 | 440 | 13 | 6°55′38″N 123°58′18″E |
| Datu Hoffer Ampatuan | | 2nd | 2.1% | 25,012 | 16,295 | 8.50% | 461.10 | 178.03 | 54 | 140 | 11 | 6°51′05″N 124°25′48″E |
| Datu Montawal | | 2nd | 3.0% | 34,820 | 31,265 | 2.07% | 461.10 | 178.03 | 76 | 200 | 11 | 7°04′40″N 124°44′55″E |
| Datu Odin Sinsuat | | 1st | 8.5% | 99,210 | 76,332 | 5.12% | 461.80 | 178.30 | 210 | 540 | 34 | 7°01′25″N 124°18′57″E |
| Datu Paglas | | 2nd | 2.4% | 28,387 | 20,290 | 6.60% | 132.10 | 51.00 | 210 | 540 | 23 | 6°44′47″N 124°52′20″E |
| Datu Piang | | 2nd | 2.2% | 25,600 | 28,492 | −2.02% | 302.97 | 116.98 | 84 | 220 | 16 | 7°01′44″N 124°29′58″E |
| Datu Salibo | | 2nd | 1.3% | 14,947 | 15,062 | −0.15% | – | – | – | – | 17 | 7°01′10″N 124°28′25″E |
| Datu Saudi Ampatuan | | 2nd | 2.3% | 26,427 | 20,330 | 5.12% | 60.16 | 23.23 | 440 | 1,100 | 8 | 6°55′34″N 124°24′50″E |
| Datu Unsay | | 2nd | 1.0% | 11,813 | 12,490 | −1.06% | 95.39 | 36.83 | 120 | 310 | 8 | 6°53′25″N 124°25′57″E |
| General Salipada K. Pendatun | | 2nd | 2.4% | 28,103 | 24,004 | 3.05% | 189.37 | 73.12 | 150 | 390 | 19 | 6°49′34″N 124°45′13″E |
| Guindulungan | | 2nd | 1.7% | 19,911 | 16,071 | 4.16% | 130.68 | 50.46 | 150 | 390 | 11 | 6°57′22″N 124°23′51″E |
| Kabuntalan | | 1st | 1.5% | 17,276 | 16,794 | 0.54% | 371.08 | 143.27 | 47 | 120 | 17 | 7°07′03″N 124°23′04″E |
| Mamasapano | | 2nd | 2.1% | 24,800 | 22,354 | 2.00% | 85.31 | 32.94 | 290 | 750 | 14 | 6°53′42″N 124°30′17″E |
| Mangudadatu | | 2nd | 2.1% | 25,046 | 14,864 | 10.44% | 98.16 | 37.90 | 260 | 670 | 8 | 6°41′28″N 124°48′05″E |
| Matanog | | 1st | 2.5% | 29,770 | 23,269 | 4.80% | 146.50 | 56.56 | 200 | 520 | 8 | 7°26′17″N 124°15′14″E |
| Northern Kabuntalan | | 1st | 2.1% | 25,232 | 14,251 | 11.49% | 106.77 | 41.22 | 240 | 620 | 11 | 7°10′13″N 124°25′52″E |
| Pagalungan | | 2nd | 3.4% | 39,653 | 31,891 | 4.24% | 898.76 | 347.01 | 44 | 110 | 12 | 7°03′18″N 124°42′00″E |
| Paglat | | 2nd | 1.4% | 15,920 | 11,207 | 6.91% | 177.74 | 68.63 | 90 | 230 | 8 | 6°48′36″N 124°46′58″E |
| Pandag | | 2nd | 2.1% | 25,057 | 13,795 | 12.04% | 85.31 | 32.94 | 290 | 750 | 8 | 6°45′22″N 124°47′20″E |
| Parang | | 1st | 7.6% | 89,194 | 73,328 | 3.80% | 850.78 | 328.49 | 100 | 260 | 25 | 7°22′32″N 124°16′02″E |
| Rajah Buayan | | 2nd | 2.0% | 23,652 | 17,423 | 5.99% | 71.98 | 27.79 | 330 | 850 | 11 | 6°54′28″N 124°33′02″E |
| Shariff Aguak | | 2nd | 2.7% | 31,692 | 34,376 | −1.54% | 392.70 | 151.62 | 81 | 210 | 13 | 6°51′40″N 124°26′41″E |
| Shariff Saydona Mustapha | | 2nd | 1.7% | 19,855 | 16,442 | 3.66% | – | – | – | – | 16 | 6°58′34″N 124°28′56″E |
| South Upi | | 2nd | 3.4% | 40,178 | 35,990 | 2.12% | 184.80 | 71.35 | 220 | 570 | 11 | 6°51′18″N 124°08′36″E |
| Sultan Kudarat | | 1st | 8.1% | 95,201 | 82,758 | 2.70% | 712.91 | 275.26 | 130 | 340 | 39 | 7°16′45″N 124°18′12″E |
| Sultan Mastura | | 1st | 1.9% | 22,261 | 21,712 | 0.48% | 242.07 | 93.46 | 92 | 240 | 13 | 7°18′15″N 124°16′46″E |
| Sultan sa Barongis | | 2nd | 1.9% | 22,425 | 22,547 | −0.10% | 291.30 | 112.47 | 77 | 200 | 12 | 6°52′56″N 124°36′01″E |
| Talayan | | 2nd | 2.6% | 30,032 | 16,042 | 12.68% | 143.84 | 55.54 | 210 | 540 | 15 | 6°59′04″N 124°21′21″E |
| Talitay | | 2nd | 1.3% | 14,863 | 13,328 | 2.10% | 62.96 | 24.31 | 240 | 620 | 9 | 7°01′42″N 124°23′45″E |
| Upi | | 1st | 4.6% | 53,583 | 45,444 | 3.19% | 742.95 | 286.85 | 72 | 190 | 23 | 7°00′38″N 124°09′45″E |
| Total^{[B]} | | | | 1,173,933 | 944,718 | 4.22% | —^{[C]} | —^{[C]} | —^{[C]} | —^{[C]} | 508 | (see GeoGroup box) |
1. Coordinates are sortable by latitude. (Italicized entries indicate the generic location. Otherwise, they mark the city or town center).; 2. Total figures exclude the independent component city of Cotabato, which is geographically within and traditionally grouped with the province.; 3. Total population density and area (sum of all component municipalities: 10,190.14 km^{2} or 1,019,014 ha) is inconclusive as it conflicts with the figures given by the Maguindanao Provincial Government website (5,970.53 km^{2} or 597,052.79 ha), as well as the Philippine Statistics Authority itself (9,729.04 km^{2} or 972,904 ha).; 4. The city of Cotabato, which is geographically within and traditionally grouped with the province, is independent from the province and does not vote for provincial officials. Only votes with Maguindanao for representation in the various national legislatures.; 5. Dashes (—) in cells indicate unavailable information.

The province saw establishments of new municipalities, especially during the 2000s. Then ARMM Regional Legislative Assembly (RLA) secretary Dick Mali said such establishments would help in "decentralizing functions and resources" and provide the people "more efficient public service and governance from their public officials." However, Benedicto Bacani of the Institute of Autonomy and Governance in the Notre Dame University said such acts are methods to prevent potential conflicts between political families by having their own local government units where they can have governmental positions.

== Demographics ==
Population census of Maguindanao
| Year | Pop. | ±% p.a. |
|---|---|---|
| 1903 | 89,871 | — |
| 1918 | 69,717 | −1.68% |
| 1939 | 126,568 | +2.88% |
| 1948 | 224,382 | +6.57% |
| 1960 | 339,600 | +3.51% |
| 1970 | 415,154 | +2.03% |
| 1975 | 411,022 | −0.20% |
| 1980 | 452,675 | +1.95% |
| 1990 | 630,674 | +3.37% |
| 1995 | 662,180 | +0.92% |
| 2000 | 801,102 | +4.17% |
| 2007 | 1,273,715 | +6.60% |
| 2010 | 944,718 | −10.30% |
| 2015 | 1,173,933 | +4.22% |
| 2020 | 1,667,258 | +7.66% |
2007 population figure without Shariff Kabunsuan is 710,829. (including Cotabato City); Source: Philippine Statistics Authority

Languages Spoken (2010)
| Language | Speakers |
| Maguindanao | 608,431 |
| Iranun | 173,806 |
| Teduray/Tiruray | 79,007 |
| Hiligaynon | 30,026 |
| Cebuano/Bisaya/Boholano | 29,812 |
| Others | 22,728 |

The population of Maguindanao in the 2020 census was 1,667,258 people. When Cotabato City was included for geographical purposes, the province's population is 1,667,258 people.

The majority (64.5 percent) of the people in Maguindanao were Maguindanaoans. The Iranuns which dominate the northern towns of Parang, Barira, Buldon and Matanog made up the second largest group with 18.4 percent. The Tedurays, which are the Lumads of the southwestern highlands of the province, made up 8.4 percent of the entire population, while Hiligaynons and Cebuanos constituted the remaining significant groups in the province with each making up 3.2 percent of the population.

The main native languages were Maguindanao and Iranun, while Tagalog had emerged as the primary language among younger generations and was the primary medium of education, making it the province's lingua franca. Cebuano, Hiligaynon, Chavacano, and, to the lesser extent, Ilocano were also spoken by Ilocano settlers from Northern Luzon, with the Chavacano dialect spoken in Cotabato City being called Cotabateño spoke by settlers from Zamboanga City, which evolved from the Zamboangueño dialect and Cebuano as spoken as the lingua franca of most of Mindanao who are settlers from Visayas. Teduray, also native to the province, was spoken in the municipalities of Upi, South Upi, and Datu Blah T. Sinsuat. English, being one of the country's official languages, was also spoken, while Arabic was taught in Islamic schools.

=== Religion ===
Maguindanao inhabitants are predominantly practitioners of Islam which comprises 82.99% of the population, majority of which are followers of Sunni Islam. A minority are Christians (mostly Roman Catholics), who were mostly Cebuanos, Ilonggos and Chavacanos. Roman Catholics of Maguindanao fell under the jurisdiction of the Roman Catholic Diocese of Kidapawan, a suffragan of the Archdiocese of Cotabato. Iglesia ni Cristo (INC) had several locales in Maguindanao.

== Government ==
Maguindanao was divided into two congressional districts, which elected members to the House of Representatives. For the brief period that the province of Shariff Kabunsuan existed, Maguindanao became a lone-district province. Since the appointment of a new set of provincial officials for the reunified province of Maguindanao by the ARMM Governor in January 2009, the provincial government reverted to the Sangguniang Panlalawigan district configuration from before Shariff Kabunsuan was created.

Having elected to join the Autonomous Region in Muslim Mindanao (ARMM), Maguindanao also sent six representatives (three per SP district) to the ARMM Regional Legislative Assembly that convened in Cotabato City.

=== Provincial capital ===
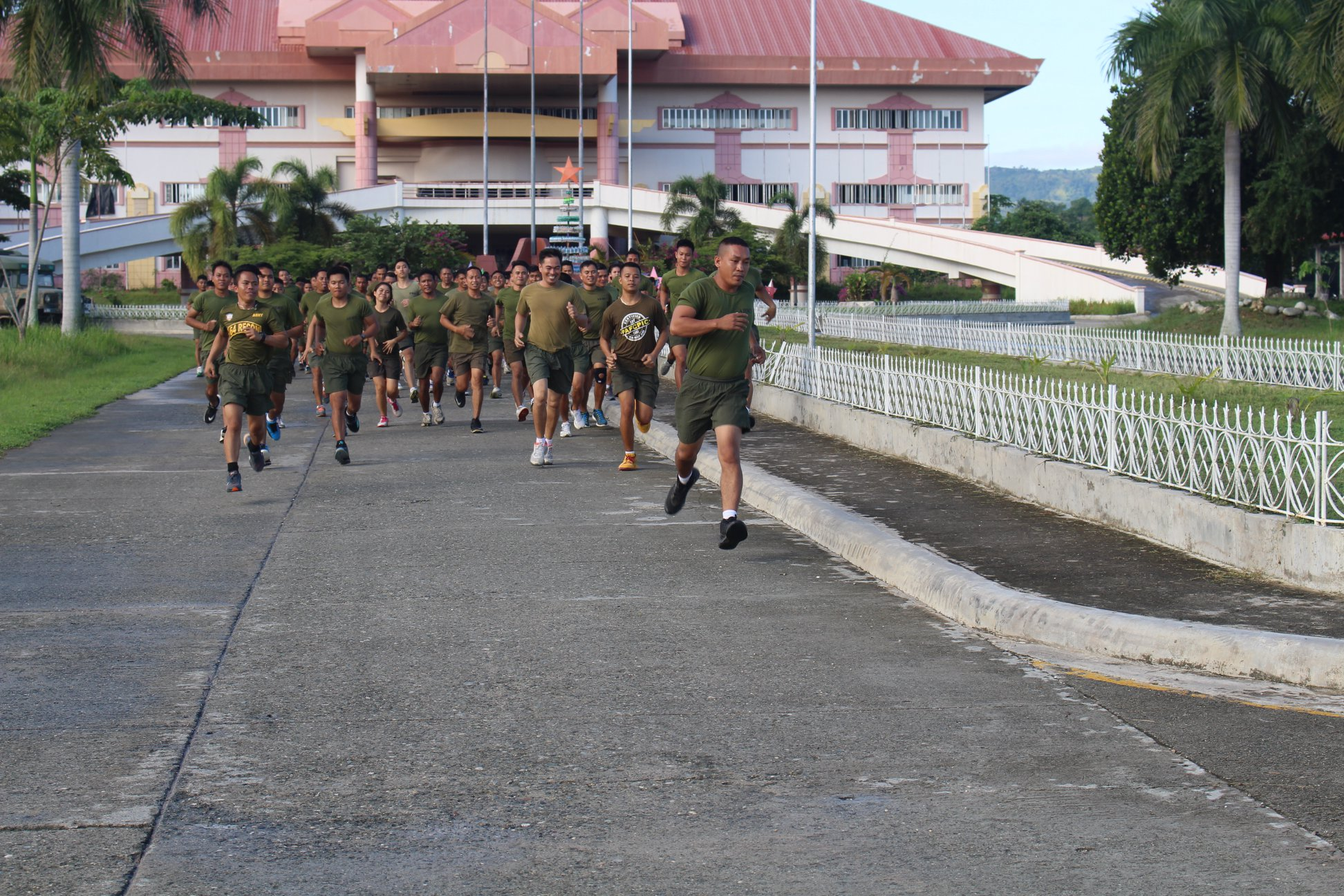
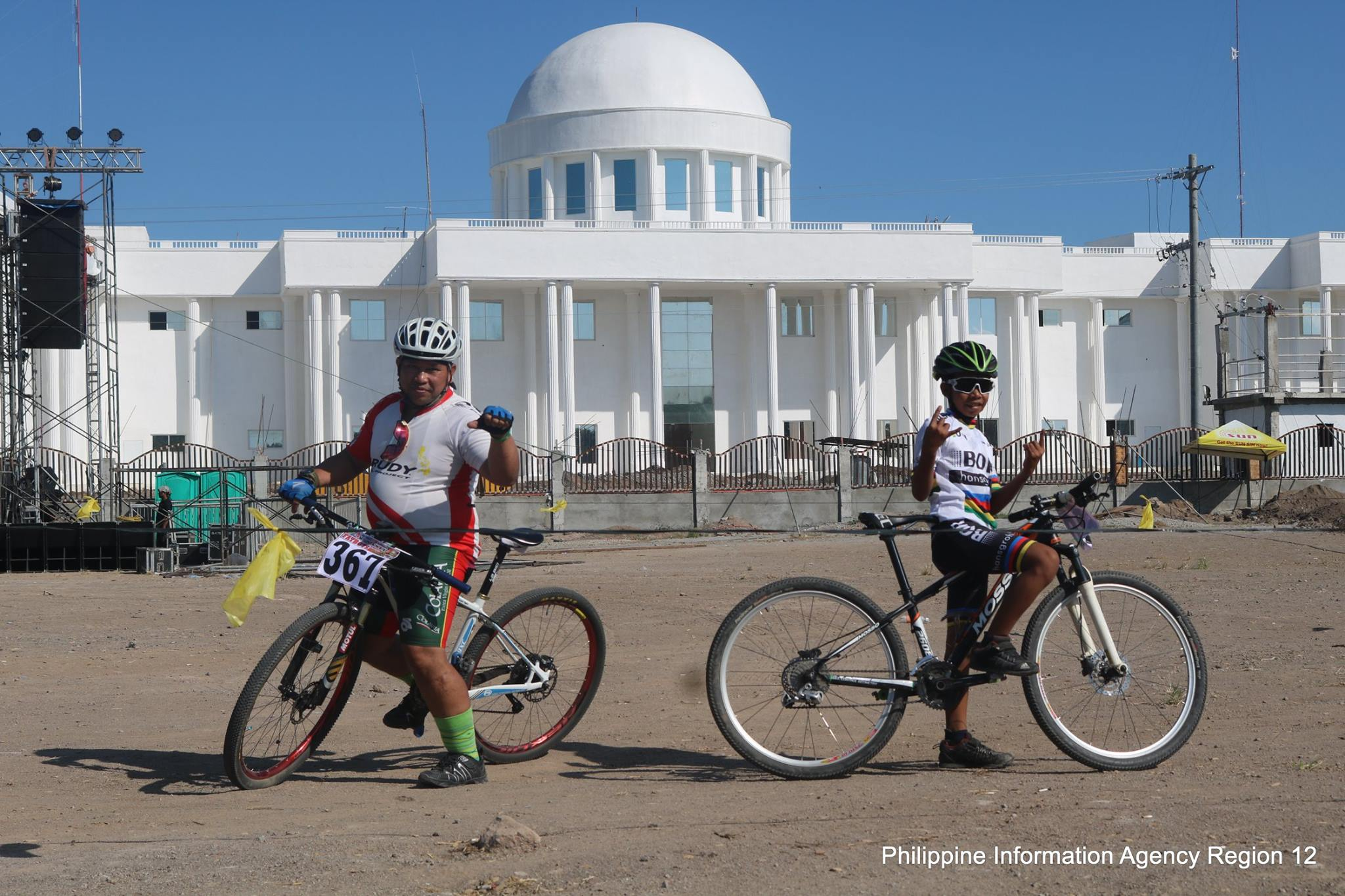
The Ampatuan-built former provincial capitol complex in Shariff Aguak (Left), and new provincial capitol complex in Buluan (Right).

When the province was established in 1973, the designated seat of government was the municipality of Maganoy. The first appointed governor, Simeon Datumanong, held office in Limpongo, a former barangay in Maganoy which is now part of the municipality of Datu Hoffer Ampatuan.

Datumanong's successor Zacaria Candao, on the other hand, held office at P.C. Hill, the site of the former headquarters of the Philippine Constabulary in Cotabato City, an autonomous chartered city not under Maguindanao's provincial jurisdiction.

In 1977 following the resignation of Candao, President Ferdinand Marcos moved the province's seat of government to the municipality of Sultan Kudarat (hometown of the newly appointed governor Sanggacala Baraguir) by virtue of Presidential Decree No. 1170. During his term Baraguir held office at the then-newly constructed provincial capitol in that municipality's Barangay Simuay Crossing.

The next governor, Sandiale Sambolawan, held office in his hometown of Maganoy following his election to the governorship in 1980. In an attempt to legitimize the restoration of Maganoy's status as the seat of provincial government, Batas Pambansa Blg. 211 was enacted in 1982, but with the explicit provision that the change will only take effect after a plebiscite affirms the transfer. A plebiscite was scheduled for December 18, 1982, but was never administered, thus making the municipality of Sultan Kudarat still capital of Maguindanao by law (de jure), but Maganoy being the capital in practice (de facto). Following the end of the Marcos Regime, the next two governors – Zacaria Candao (1986–1992; 1995–2001) and Norodin Matalam (1992–1995) – both held office in the existing capitol at Sultan Kudarat thereby restoring the municipality's status as both de jure and de facto provincial capital from 1986 to 2001.

Despite the lack of legal justification in the form of a law amending P.D. No. 1170 of 1977 or the passage of a supporting Sangguaniang Panlalawigan (SP) resolution, the next governor, Andal Ampatuan Sr. (governor from 2001 to 2008), and his successor, son Sajid Ampatuan (2008–2009), held office in the Ampatuan clan stronghold of Shariff Aguak (renamed from Maganoy in 1996), citing security concerns connected to clan rivalry. A new ₱218-million provincial capitol complex, inaugurated in 2009 in the presence of President Gloria Macapagal Arroyo, was located adjacent to the homes of the Ampatuans, and sat on a piece of Amaptuan clan land that had not been legally deeded to the government. The Ampatuans were even known to spend more time within the "satellite offices" they set up within their private properties, despite though the new capitol being located adjacent to their homes.

Esmael Mangudadatu, who took office after defeating Andal Ampatuan Jr. in the 2010 gubernatorial election, cited security concerns when he decided to work from a "satellite office," named the Rajah Buayan Silongan Peace Center, in his hometown of Buluan; this move was supported by Resolution No. 5, series 2010, of the Sangguniang Panlalawigan (SP) of Maguindanao. SP Resolution No. 78, dated May 3, 2011, further allowed the transfer of the legislative branch of the provincial government (Sangguniang Panlalawigan) to the rehabilitated old capitol site in Barangay Simuay Crossing, Sultan Kudarat. This effectively made both Buluan and Sultan Kudarat – located 120 kilometers apart by road – the seats of the executive and legislative branches of provincial government respectively.

On April 3, 2012, the SP of Maguindanao issued Resolution No. 132, reiterating that the town of Sultan Kudarat was the capital of Maguindanao. However this was superseded by a new resolution passed in 2014 naming Buluan the new capital of Maguindanao. Buluan's Rajah Buayan Silongan Peace Center then served as the provisional capitol building, pending the completion of the executive building in the new capitol complex. However, the legislative branch of provincial government, the Sangguniang Panlalawigan of Maguindanao, continued to hold sessions in the rehabilitated buildings of the old provincial capitol in Simuay, Sultan Kudarat.

The Ampatuan-built former provincial capitol complex in Shariff Aguak, initially planned to be converted for public school use, was planned to become the new headquarters of the ARMM's Bureau of Fire Protection and eventually became an infantry brigade of the Philippine Army. However, incumbent governor Bai Mariam Mangudadatu held her office in the Shariff Aguak Provincial Capitol and planned to convert the Buluan provincial capitol to a district hospital.

Following the provincial division as approved in the 2022 plebiscite, Section 5 of Republic Act No. 11550 officially designated Buluan as the capital of the mother province of Maguindanao del Sur where Shariff Aguak is also located. Sultan Kudarat municipality was designated to Maguindanao del Norte but Datu Odin Sinsuat will be designated as its capital.

== Economy ==
Poverty incidence of Maguindanao (%)

Source: Philippine Statistics Authority

== Musical heritage ==
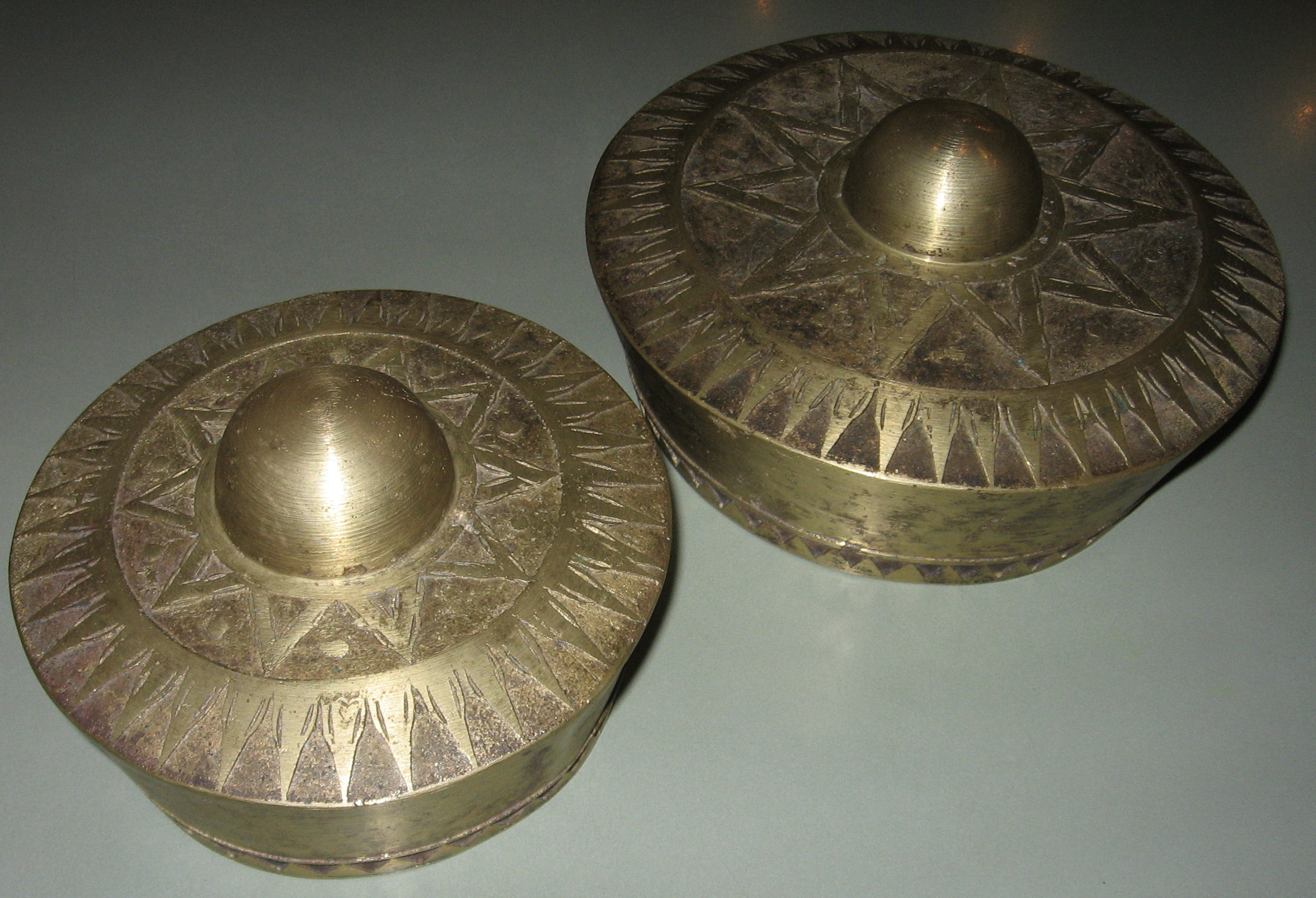
Brass gongs used as a main melodic instrument in the Kulintang ensemble.

The native Maguindanaon culture revolved around Kulintang music, a specific type of gong music, found among both Muslim and non-Muslim groups of the Southern Philippines.
