= Maguindanao del Sur's 5th parliamentary district =

Parliamentary district for the Bangsamoro Parliament

- Constituency for the Bangsamoro Parliament
- Boundary of Maguindanao del Sur's 5th parliamentary district in Maguindanao del Sur
- Province: Maguindanao del Sur
- Population: 205,792 (2024)
- Electorate: 121,734 (2026)

Current constituency
- Member of Parliament: Rafsanjani Ali (elect)
- Political party: BFP

Maguindanao del Sur's 5th parliamentary district is the fifth of the five parliamentary districts of the province of Maguindanao del Sur for the Bangsamoro Parliament. It is composed of the municipalities of Datu Montawal, General Salipada K. Pendatun, Pagalungan, Paglat, Rajah Buayan, and Sultan sa Barongis.

Rafsanjani Ali of the Bangsamoro Federalist Party is the member of Parliament-elect for the district following the inaugural 2026 Bangsamoro Parliament election. He will assume office on October 30, 2026.

== List of MPs representing the district ==
No.	Portrait	Member (Lifespan)	Term of office	Party	Parliament	Electoral history	Constituencies
1		Rafsanjani Ali (born 1982)	Assuming office on October 30, 2026	BFP	1st Parliament	Elected in 2026.	2026–present Datu Montawal, General Salipada K. Pendatun, Pagalungan, Paglat, Rajah Buayan, Sultan sa Barongis

== Election results ==
=== 2026 ===
2026 Bangsamoro Parliament election in Maguindanao del Sur
Party	Candidate	Votes	%
BFP	Rafsanjani Ali	66,477	63.14
UBJP	Anwar Alamada	38,459	36.53
BaPa	Nasser Dalgan	342	0.32
Total votes		105,278	100.00
BFP win (new seat)			
