= Bangsamoro Regional Hospital and Medical Center =

Geography
- Location: Datu Hoffer Ampatuan, Maguindanao del Sur, Bangsamoro, Philippines

Organization
- Type: Tertiary

Services
- Emergency department: yes
- Beds: 350

History
- Former name: Maguindanao Provincial Hospital (until 2025)
- Opened: 1974

Links
- Website: www.ipho.website
- Lists: Hospitals in the Philippines

Bangsamoro Regional Hospital and Medical Center is a government-owned hospital in Datu Hoffer Ampatuan, Maguindanao del Sur, Philippines.

== History ==
The hospital started as the Maguindanao Provincial Hospital. It was established in 1974 as a 50-bed center in Maganoy (now Shariff Aguak).

In 2015, the hospital now in Datu Hoffer Ampatuan has been renovating with its bed capacity having grown to 150.

The Bangsamoro Parliament upgraded the Maguindanao hospital via Bangsamoro Autonomy Act No. 74 which was approved in May 26, 2025. The bill was authored by Kadil Sinolinding Jr., Sittie Fahanie Oyod, and Baintan Ampatuan. The facility was upgraded to a Level III tertiary hospital under Department of Health (DOH) standards. The law mandated the increase of bed capacity to 350.

The hospital was inaugurated as the Bangsamoro Regional Hospital and Medical Center on October 8, 2025.

== Management ==
The hospital is under management of the Bangsamoro regional government rather than the national Department of Health (DOH).
