= Maguindanao del Sur's at-large congressional district =

Legislative district of the Philippines

- Constituency for the House of Representatives of the Philippines
- Map
- Location of Maguindanao del Sur within the Philippines
- Province: Maguindanao del Sur
- Region: Bangsamoro
- Population: 741,221 (2020)
- Electorate: 468,686 (2025)
- Major settlements: 25 LGUs: Municipalities; Ampatuan; Buluan; Datu Abdullah Sangki; Datu Anggal Midtimbang; Datu Hoffer Ampatuan; Datu Montawal; Datu Paglas; Datu Piang; Datu Salibo; Datu Saudi Ampatuan; Datu Unsay; General Salipada K. Pendatun; Guindulungan; Mamasapano; Mangudadatu; Pagalungan; Paglat; Pandag; Rajah Buayan; Shariff Aguak; Shariff Saydona Mustapha; South Upi; Sultan sa Barongis; Talayan; Talitay
- Area: 4,728.90 km^{2} (1,825.84 sq mi)

Current constituency
- Created: 2022
- Representative: Esmael Mangudadatu
- Political party: PFP; BFP
- Congressional bloc: Majority

Maguindanao del Sur's at-large congressional district refers to the lone congressional districts of the Philippines in the province of Maguindanao del Sur. It has been represented in the House of Representatives since the province's creation in 2022. It is currently represented in the 20th Congress by Esmael Mangudadatu of the Partido Federal ng Pilipinas (PFP) and Bangsamoro Federalist Party (BFP).

== Representation history ==
#	Member		Term of office		Congress	Party	Electoral history
#	Image	Name	Start	End	Congress	Party	Electoral history
=== Maguindanao del Sur's at-large district for the House of Representatives of the Philippines ===
District created September 18, 2022.
1		Mohamad P. Paglas	September 18, 2022	June 30, 2025	19th	Nacionalista	Redistricted from Maguindanao's 2nd district.
1		Mohamad P. Paglas	September 18, 2022	June 30, 2025	19th	Lakas	Redistricted from Maguindanao's 2nd district.
2		Esmael Mangudadatu	June 30, 2025	Incumbent	20th	PFP (BFP)	Elected in 2025.

== Election history ==
=== 2025 ===
Candidate	Party	Votes	%
Esmael Mangudadatu	Partido Federal ng Pilipinas	166,090	50.12
Tong Paglas (incumbent)	Lakas–CMD	165,280	49.88
Total		331,370	100.00
Registered voters/turnout		451,687	–
Partido Federal ng Pilipinas gain from Lakas–CMD			
Source: Commission on Elections

== See also ==
- Maguindanao's 2nd congressional district
