= South Upi =

Municipality in Maguindanao del Sur, Philippines

- Municipality
- Municipality of South Upi
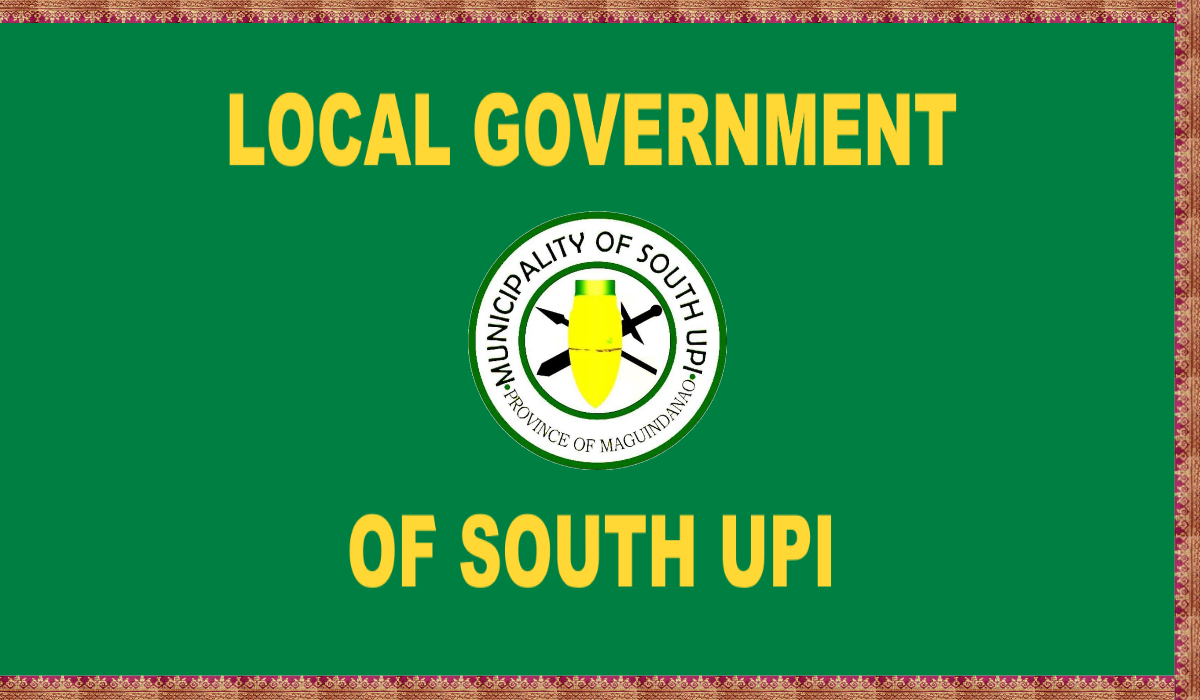
- Flag Seal

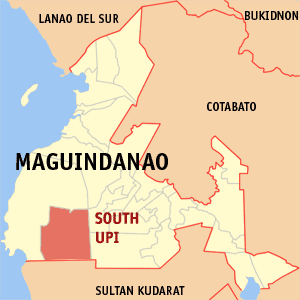
- Map of Maguindanao del Sur with South Upi highlighted
- Interactive map of South Upi
- Location within the Philippines
- Coordinates: 6°51′17″N 124°08′39″E
- Country: Philippines
- Region: Bangsamoro Autonomous Region in Muslim Mindanao
- Province: Maguindanao del Sur
- House district: Lone district
- Parliamentary district: 1st district
- Founded: September 22, 1976
- Barangays: 11 (see Barangays)

Government
  - Type: Sangguniang Bayan
  - Mayor: Helen Benito–Padua
  - Vice Mayor: Reynalbert O. Insular
  - House Representative: Esmael Mangudadatu
  - Municipal Council: Members: Alberto B. Estorninos; Basit U. Kamid; Tessie J. Moendeg; Rogen S. Palma; Marlon Michael T. Bansigan; Rommel L. Erese; Saturnino C. Cuyong Jr.; Joel B. Eran
  - Electorate: 31,886 voters (2025)

Area
  - Total: 184.80 km^{2} (71.35 sq mi)
- Elevation: 639 m (2,096 ft)
- Highest elevation: 1,083 m (3,553 ft)
- Lowest elevation: 247 m (810 ft)

Population (2024)
  - Total: 50,018
  - Density: 270.66/km^{2} (701.01/sq mi)
  - Households: 7,878

Economy
  - Income class: 2nd municipal income class
  - Poverty incidence: 57.44% (2023)
  - Revenue: ₱ 201.5 million (2024)
  - Assets: ₱ 252.6 million (2024)
  - Expenditure: ₱ 200.5 million (2024)
  - Liabilities: ₱ 44.08 million (2024)

Service provider
  - Electricity: Maguindanao Electric Cooperative (MAGELCO)
- Time zone: UTC+8 (PST)
- ZIP code: 9603
- PSGC: 1903817000
- IDD : area code: +63 (0)64
- Native languages: Maguindanao; Teduray; Tagalog
- Website: www.southupi.gov.ph

South Upi, officially the Municipality of South Upi (Maguindanaon: Pagabagatan Upi; Iranun: Inged a South Upi; Tagalog: Bayan ng South Upi), is a municipality in the province of Maguindanao del Sur, Philippines. According to the 2024 census, it had a population of 27,929.

Parliament Bill No. 380 has been introduced on August 20, 2025, proposing a name change for the municipality to Teduray, which "reflects the aspirations of the [namesake] people for cultural recognition, historical justice, and self-determination".

== History ==
South Upi was created through Presidential Decree No. 1011 by then President Ferdinand Marcos on September 22, 1976. It was carved from the municipality of Upi, when it was still in the province of [the presently non-existent] Maguindanao.

== Geography ==
=== Barangays ===
South Upi is politically subdivided into 11 barangays. Each barangay consists of puroks while some have sitios.

- Biarong
- Bongo
- Itaw
- Kigan
- Kuya
- Lamud
- Looy
- Pandan
- Pilar
- Romangaob (Poblacion)
- San Jose

=== Climate ===
Climate data for South Upi, Maguindanao del Sur
Month	Jan	Feb	Mar	Apr	May	Jun	Jul	Aug	Sep	Oct	Nov	Dec	Year
Mean daily maximum °C (°F)	31 (88)	32 (90)	32 (90)	32 (90)	31 (88)	29 (84)	29 (84)	29 (84)	30 (86)	30 (86)	30 (86)	31 (88)	31 (87)
Mean daily minimum °C (°F)	21 (70)	21 (70)	21 (70)	23 (73)	23 (73)	23 (73)	23 (73)	23 (73)	23 (73)	23 (73)	23 (73)	22 (72)	22 (72)
Average precipitation mm (inches)	30 (1.2)	19 (0.7)	25 (1.0)	24 (0.9)	64 (2.5)	88 (3.5)	102 (4.0)	105 (4.1)	76 (3.0)	82 (3.2)	60 (2.4)	26 (1.0)	701 (27.5)
Average rainy days	9.8	8.5	11.3	11.9	21.6	23.9	24.1	24.5	20.9	21.8	16.8	11.8	206.9
Source: Meteoblue (modeled/calculated data, not measured locally)

== Demographics ==
Population census of South Upi
Year	Pop.	±% p.a.
1980	11,463	—
1990	20,293	+5.88%
1995	23,186	+2.53%
2000	28,186	+4.28%
2007	32,014	+1.77%
2010	35,990	+4.35%
2015	40,178	+2.12%
2020	43,197	+1.54%
2024	27,929	−9.94%
Source: Philippine Statistics Authority

== Economy ==
Poverty Incidence of South Upi

Source: Philippine Statistics Authority
