= Rajah Buayan =

Municipality in Maguindanao del Sur, Philippines

- Municipality
- Municipality of Rajah Buayan
- Municipal Compound

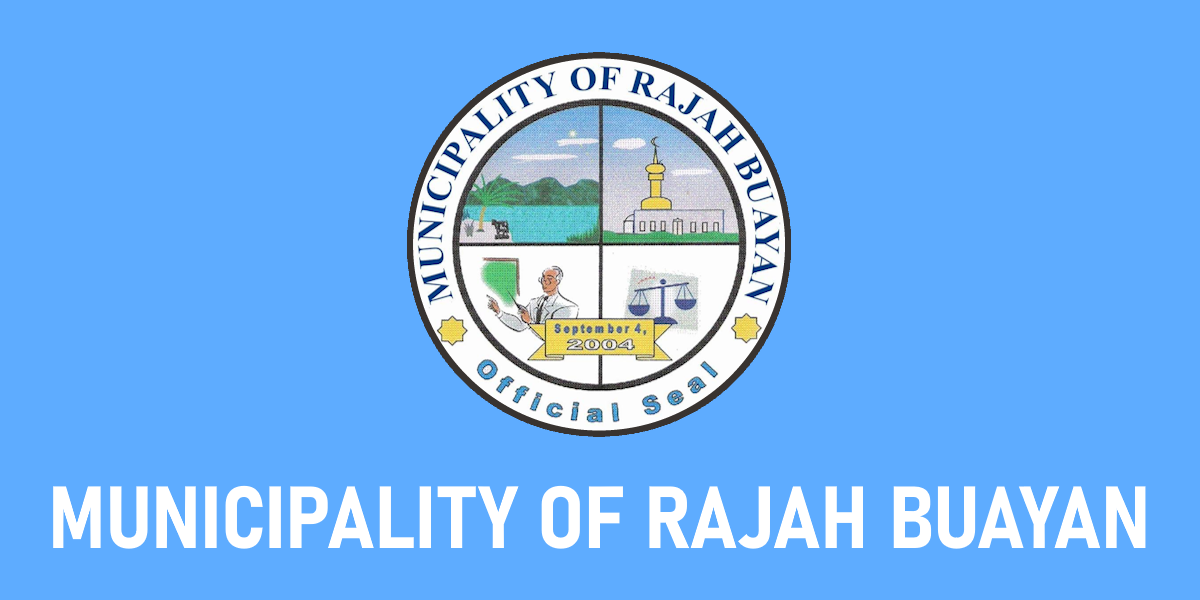
- Flag Seal
- Motto: Udzul ka Rajah Buayan!
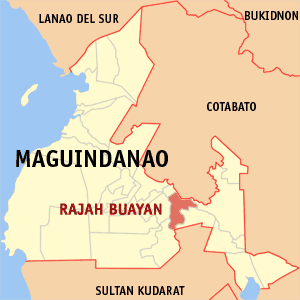
- Map of Maguindanao del Sur with Rajah Buayan highlighted
- Interactive map of Rajah Buayan
- Location within the Philippines
- Coordinates: 6°54′39″N 124°33′03″E
- Country: Philippines
- Region: Bangsamoro Autonomous Region in Muslim Mindanao
- Province: Maguindanao del Sur
- House district: Lone district
- Parliamentary district: 5th district
- Founded: September 4, 2004
- Barangays: 11 (see Barangays)

Government
  - Type: Sangguniang Bayan
  - Mayor: Yacob Lumenda Ampatuan
  - Vice Mayor: Jerry P. Makalay
  - House Representative: Mohamad P. Paglas Sr.
  - Municipal Council: Members: Jamshid A. Ampatuan; Syed Kamal Reza L. Ampatuan; Mohamiden D. Lumenda; Mansor S. Makalay; Yamashita L. Ibrahim; Alvin M. Dagandal; Bai Isnaeera A. Blah; Rashed C. Badal
  - Electorate: 14,731 voters (2025)

Area
  - Total: 71.98 km^{2} (27.79 sq mi)
- Elevation: 15 m (49 ft)
- Highest elevation: 76 m (249 ft)
- Lowest elevation: 5 m (16 ft)

Population (2024 census)
  - Total: 37,437
  - Density: 520.1/km^{2} (1,347/sq mi)
  - Households: 4,589

Economy
  - Income class: 4th municipal income class
  - Poverty incidence: 41.64% (2023)
  - Revenue: ₱ 131.9 million (2024)
  - Assets: ₱ 101.1 million (2024)
  - Expenditure: ₱ 138.5 million (2024)
  - Liabilities: ₱ 3.468 million (2024)

Service provider
  - Electricity: Maguindanao Electric Cooperative (MAGELCO)
- Time zone: UTC+8 (PST)
- ZIP code: 9611
- PSGC: 1903829000
- IDD : area code: +63 (0)64
- Native languages: Maguindanao; Tagalog

Rajah Buayan, officially the Municipality of Rajah Buayan (Maguindanaon: Ingud nu Rajah Buayan; Iranun: Inged a Rajah Buayan; Tagalog: Bayan ng Rajah Buayan), is a municipality in the province of Maguindanao del Sur. According to the 2024 census, it had a population of 37,437.

== History ==
=== Sultanate of Buayan ===
Rajah Buayan, previously known as Sapakan, rose to prominence as the capital of Buayan during Datu Uto's reign in 1875. It also served as the seat of power for the Sultanates of Tinungkup and Bacat in 1899, which were governed by Datu Ali and Datu Piang respectively.

=== Modern era ===
The municipality was created under Muslim Mindanao Autonomy Act No. 166 dated October 28, 2002, and was ratified through plebiscite on September 4, 2004. It was carved out of the town of Sultan sa Barongis.

== Geography ==
=== Barangays ===
Rajah Buayan is politically subdivided into 11 barangays. Each barangay consists of puroks while some have sitios.

- Baital
- Bakat
- Dapantis
- Gaunan
- Malibpolok
- Mileb
- Panadtaban
- Pidsandawan
- Sampao
- Tabungao
- Zapakan (Poblacion)

=== Climate ===
Climate data for Rajah Buayan, Maguindanao del Sur
Month	Jan	Feb	Mar	Apr	May	Jun	Jul	Aug	Sep	Oct	Nov	Dec	Year
Mean daily maximum °C (°F)	32 (90)	32 (90)	33 (91)	33 (91)	32 (90)	31 (88)	30 (86)	31 (88)	31 (88)	31 (88)	31 (88)	31 (88)	32 (89)
Mean daily minimum °C (°F)	21 (70)	21 (70)	21 (70)	22 (72)	23 (73)	23 (73)	23 (73)	23 (73)	23 (73)	23 (73)	23 (73)	22 (72)	22 (72)
Average precipitation mm (inches)	19 (0.7)	14 (0.6)	15 (0.6)	18 (0.7)	33 (1.3)	42 (1.7)	44 (1.7)	42 (1.7)	30 (1.2)	31 (1.2)	28 (1.1)	17 (0.7)	333 (13.2)
Average rainy days	6.9	5.6	6.9	8.1	15.1	17.5	17.8	18.5	14.9	14.9	12.4	8.0	146.6
Source: Meteoblue (modeled/calculated data, not measured locally)

== Demographics ==
Population census of Rajah Buayan
Year	Pop.	±% p.a.
2007	24,973	—
2010	17,423	−12.28%
2015	23,652	+5.99%
2020	27,832	+3.48%
2024	37,437	+7.38%
Source: Philippine Statistics Authority

== Economy ==
Poverty Incidence of Rajah Buayan

Source: Philippine Statistics Authority
