= Datu Hoffer Ampatuan =

Municipality in Maguindanao del Sur, Philippines

- Municipality
- Municipality of Datu Hoffer Ampatuan
- Municipal Hall

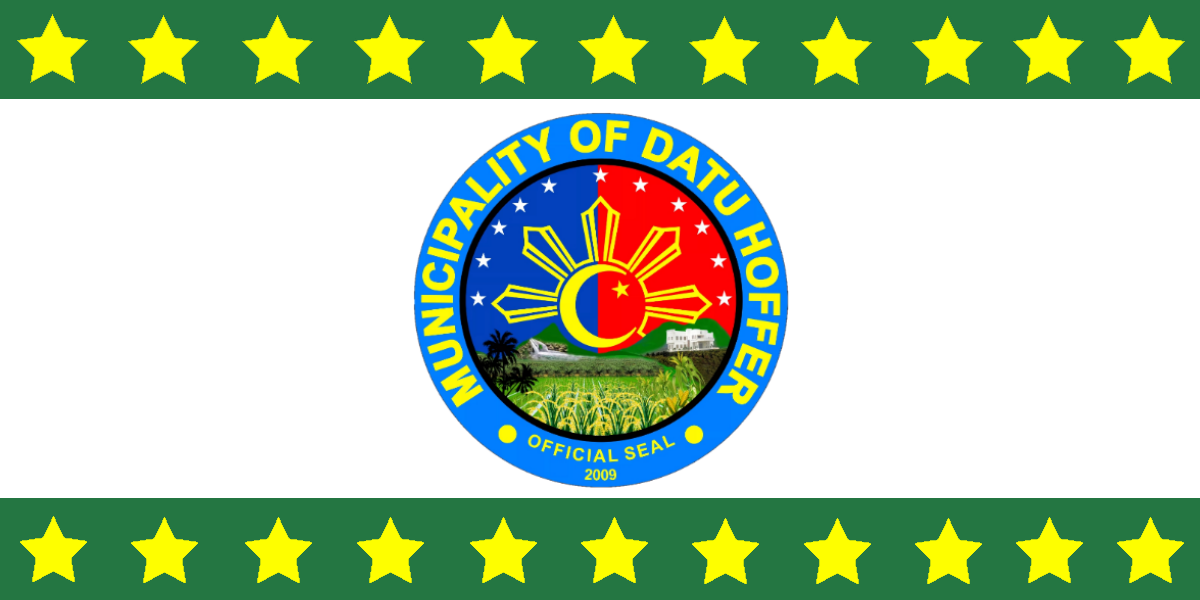
- Flag Seal

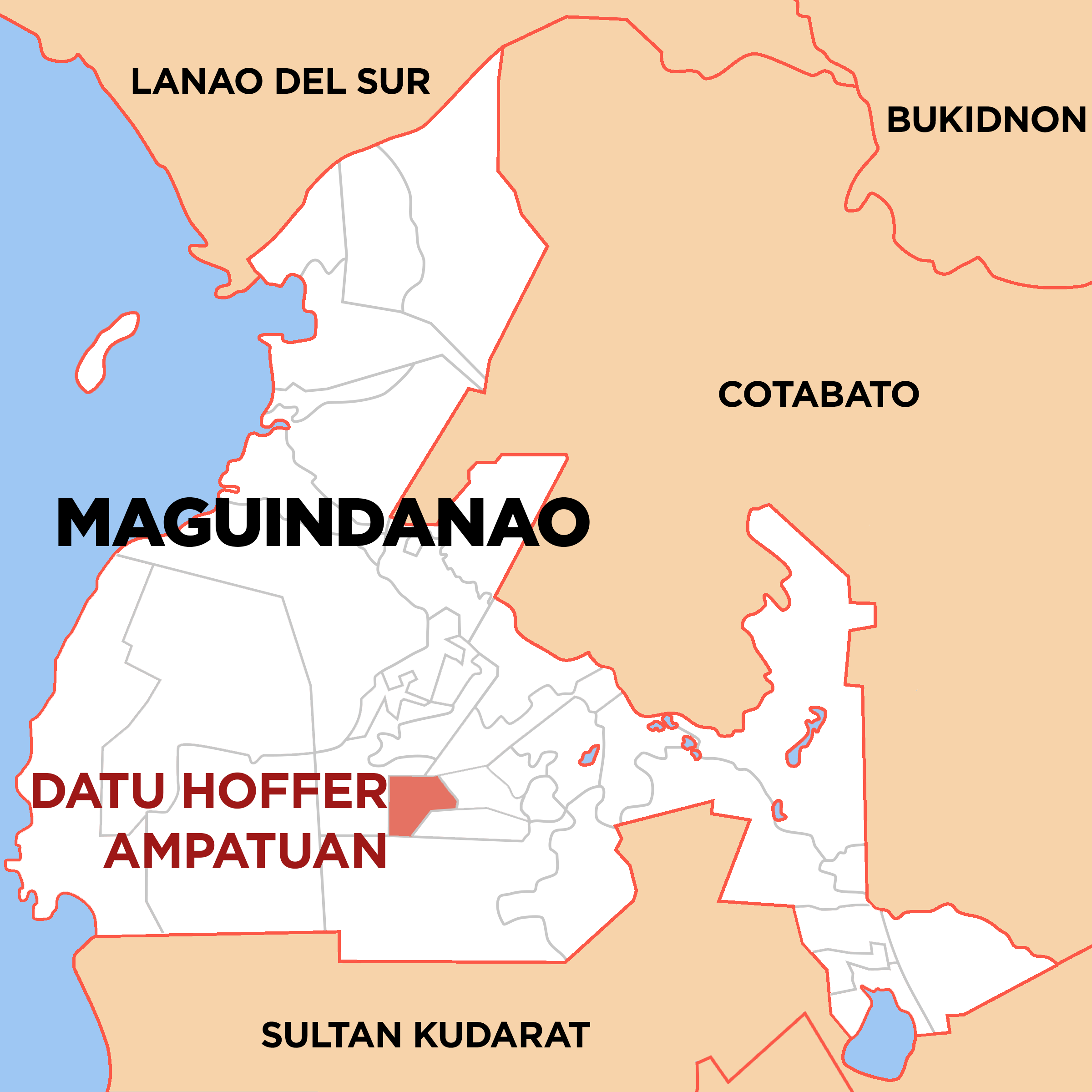
- Map of Maguindanao del Sur with Datu Hoffer Ampatuan highlighted
- Interactive map of Datu Hoffer Ampatuan
- Location within the Philippines
- Coordinates: 6°51′29″N 124°25′31″E
- Country: Philippines
- Region: Bangsamoro Autonomous Region in Muslim Mindanao
- Province: Maguindanao del Sur
- House district: Lone district
- Parliamentary district: 1st district
- Founded: July 30, 2009
- Barangays: 11 (see Barangays)

Government
  - Type: Sangguniang Bayan
  - Mayor: Bongbong M. Ampatuan
  - Vice Mayor: Prince Sufri Norabbie M. Ampatuan
  - House Representative: Mohamad P. Paglas Sr.
  - Municipal Council: Members: Bai Nor-Aila Kristina M. Ampatuan-Samama; Norhuda K. Upam; Pandag S. Ampatuan; Akas M. Ampatuan; Haron H. Kahal; Daodi T. Ali; Norodin L. Ampatuan; Tano M. Dian
  - Electorate: 11,170 voters (2025)

Area
  - Total: 193.45 km^{2} (74.69 sq mi)
- Elevation: 132 m (433 ft)
- Highest elevation: 751 m (2,464 ft)
- Lowest elevation: 15 m (49 ft)

Population (2024 census)
  - Total: 27,678
  - Density: 143.08/km^{2} (370.56/sq mi)
  - Households: 4,443

Economy
  - Income class: 4th municipal income class
  - Poverty incidence: 45.99% (2023)
  - Revenue: ₱ 131.4 million (2024)
  - Assets: ₱ 166.4 million (2024)
  - Expenditure: ₱ 126.8 million (2024)
  - Liabilities: ₱ 53.04 million (2024)

Service provider
  - Electricity: Maguindanao Electric Cooperative (MAGELCO)
- Time zone: UTC+8 (PST)
- ZIP code: 9608
- PSGC: 1903835000
- IDD : area code: +63 (0)64
- Native languages: Maguindanao; Tagalog

Datu Hoffer Ampatuan, officially the Municipality of Datu Hoffer Ampatuan (Maguindanaon: Inged nu Datu Hoffer Ampatuan; Jawi: ايڠد نو داتو حوۏر امڤتوان; Tagalog: Bayan ng Datu Hoffer Ampatuan), is a municipality in the province of Maguindanao del Sur, Philippines. According to the 2024 census, it had a population of 27,678.

== History ==
The town was created out of 9 barangays from the municipality of Shariff Aguak, and portions of 2 barangays from Datu Unsay, by virtue of Muslim Mindanao Autonomy Act No. 220, which was subsequently ratified in a plebiscite held on July 30, 2009.

== Geography ==
=== Barangays ===
Datu Hoffer Ampatuan is politically subdivided into 11 barangays. Each barangay consists of puroks while some have sitios.

- Kubentong
- Labu-labu I
- Labu-labu II
- Limpongo
- Macalag
- Sayap
- Taib
- Talibadok
- Tuayan
- Tuayan I
- Tuntungan

=== Climate ===
Climate data for Datu Hoffer Ampatuan, Maguindanao del Sur
Month	Jan	Feb	Mar	Apr	May	Jun	Jul	Aug	Sep	Oct	Nov	Dec	Year
Mean daily maximum °C (°F)	31 (88)	31 (88)	32 (90)	31 (88)	30 (86)	29 (84)	29 (84)	29 (84)	29 (84)	29 (84)	30 (86)	30 (86)	30 (86)
Mean daily minimum °C (°F)	20 (68)	21 (70)	21 (70)	22 (72)	23 (73)	23 (73)	22 (72)	23 (73)	23 (73)	23 (73)	22 (72)	21 (70)	22 (72)
Average precipitation mm (inches)	30 (1.2)	19 (0.7)	25 (1.0)	24 (0.9)	64 (2.5)	88 (3.5)	102 (4.0)	105 (4.1)	76 (3.0)	82 (3.2)	60 (2.4)	26 (1.0)	701 (27.5)
Average rainy days	9.8	8.5	11.3	11.9	21.6	23.9	24.1	24.5	20.9	21.8	16.8	11.8	206.9
Source: Meteoblue (modeled/calculated data, not measured locally)

== Demographics ==
Population census of Datu Hoffer Ampatuan
Year	Pop.	±% p.a.
2010	16,295	—
2015	25,012	+8.50%
2020	26,660	+1.35%
2024	27,678	+0.90%
Source: Philippine Statistics Authority

== Economy ==
Poverty Incidence of Datu Hoffer Ampatuan

Source: Philippine Statistics Authority

== Healthcare ==
The Bangsamoro Regional Hospital and Medical Center is in Datu Hoffer.
