= Paglat =

Municipality in Maguindanao del Sur, Philippines

- Municipality
- Municipality of Paglat
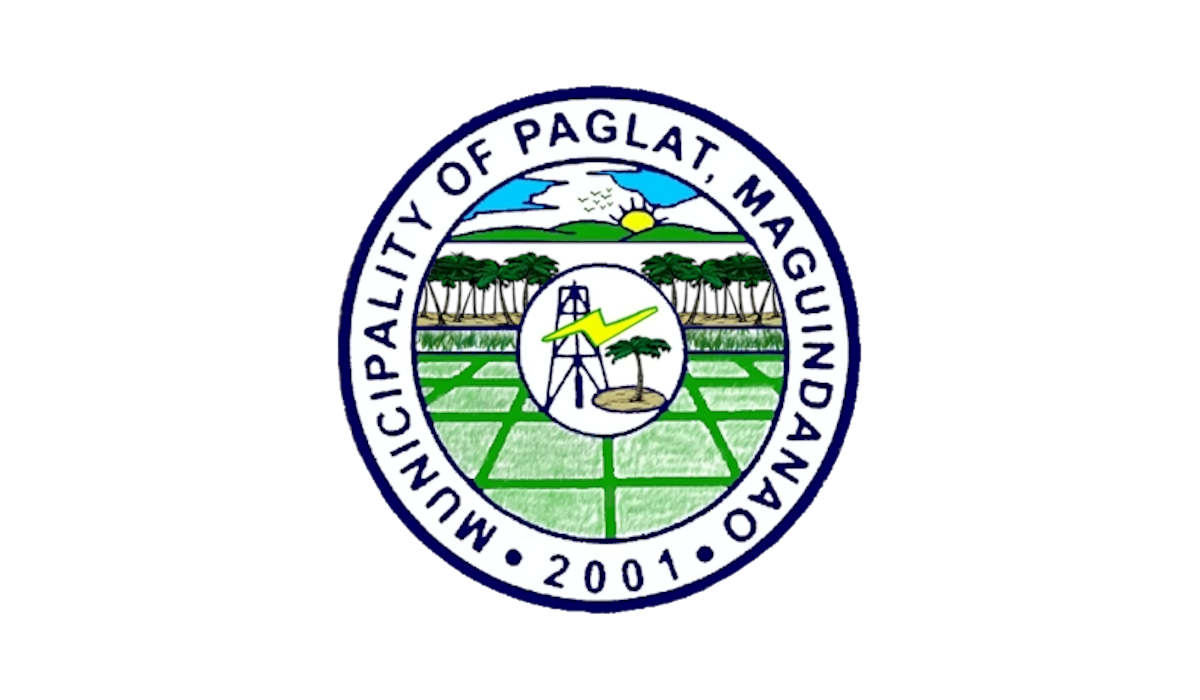
- Flag Seal

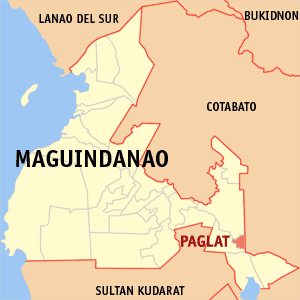
- Map of Maguindanao del Sur with Paglat highlighted
- Interactive map of Paglat
- Location within the Philippines
- Coordinates: 6°46′52″N 124°47′06″E
- Country: Philippines
- Region: Bangsamoro Autonomous Region in Muslim Mindanao
- Province: Maguindanao del Sur
- House district: Lone district
- Parliamentary district: 5th district
- Founded: July 19, 2001
- Barangays: 8 (see Barangays)

Government
  - Type: Sangguniang Bayan
  - Mayor: Raisa P. Langkuno
  - Vice Mayor: Sagandingan M. Gumonsang
  - House Representative: Mohamad P. Paglas Sr.
  - Municipal Council: Members: Aladin M. Kamarudin; Jomarie D. Manalao; Jayhan M. Langkuno; Samuan K. Kitalok; Henry M. Talusan; Resty T. Delna; Jeffrey K. Talusan; Badrudin M. Sapi
  - Electorate: 11,638 voters (2025)

Area
  - Total: 177.74 km^{2} (68.63 sq mi)
- Elevation: 12 m (39 ft)
- Highest elevation: 42 m (138 ft)
- Lowest elevation: 5 m (16 ft)

Population (2024 census)
  - Total: 29,244
  - Density: 164.53/km^{2} (426.14/sq mi)
  - Households: 3,093

Economy
  - Income class: 4th municipal income class
  - Poverty incidence: 53.92% (2023)
  - Revenue: ₱ 113 million (2024)
  - Assets: ₱ 151.9 million (2024)
  - Expenditure: ₱ 97.07 million (2024)
  - Liabilities: ₱ 32.71 million (2024)

Service provider
  - Electricity: Maguindanao Electric Cooperative (MAGELCO)
- Time zone: UTC+8 (PST)
- ZIP code: 9618
- PSGC: 1903823000
- IDD : area code: +63 (0)64
- Native languages: Maguindanao; Tagalog
- Website: www.paglat.gov.ph

Paglat, officially the Municipality of Paglat (Maguindanaon: Ingud nu Paglat; Iranun: Inged a Paglat; Tagalog: Bayan ng Paglat), is a municipality in the province of Maguindanao del Sur, Philippines. According to the 2024 census, it had a population of 29,244.

== History ==
It was created under Muslim Mindanao Autonomy Act No. 112 on July 19, 2001, carved out of the municipality of General Salipada K. Pendatun.

The first appointed mayor was Bai Zulaika Pendatun-Langkuno, however, her appointment was recalled by then ARMM Governor Nur Misuari to give way for her cousin Datu Conte Mangelen, son of the then Congressman Datu Luminog Mangelen of Cotabato Province.

== Geography ==
=== Barangays ===
Paglat is politically subdivided into 8 barangays. Each barangay consists of puroks while some have sitios.

- Campo
- Damakling
- Damalusay
- Kakal
- Poblacion/Paglat
- Salam
- Tual
- Upper Idtig

=== Climate ===
Climate data for Paglat, Maguindanao del Sur
Month	Jan	Feb	Mar	Apr	May	Jun	Jul	Aug	Sep	Oct	Nov	Dec	Year
Mean daily maximum °C (°F)	31 (88)	31 (88)	32 (90)	32 (90)	31 (88)	30 (86)	30 (86)	30 (86)	30 (86)	30 (86)	30 (86)	31 (88)	31 (87)
Mean daily minimum °C (°F)	23 (73)	23 (73)	23 (73)	24 (75)	24 (75)	24 (75)	24 (75)	24 (75)	24 (75)	24 (75)	24 (75)	24 (75)	24 (75)
Average precipitation mm (inches)	64 (2.5)	45 (1.8)	59 (2.3)	71 (2.8)	140 (5.5)	179 (7.0)	192 (7.6)	198 (7.8)	163 (6.4)	147 (5.8)	113 (4.4)	66 (2.6)	1,437 (56.5)
Average rainy days	12.2	10.3	12.7	15.7	26.0	27.4	28.1	28.2	26.0	26.7	22.9	16.6	252.8
Source: Meteoblue (modeled/calculated data, not measured locally)

== Demographics ==
Population census of Paglat
Year	Pop.	±% p.a.
2007	23,432	—
2010	11,207	−23.54%
2015	15,920	+6.91%
2020	18,727	+3.48%
2024	29,244	+11.29%
Source: Philippine Statistics Authority

== Economy ==
Poverty Incidence of Paglat

Source: Philippine Statistics Authority
