= Pagalungan =

Municipality in Maguindanao del Sur, Philippines

- Municipality
- Municipality of Pagalungan
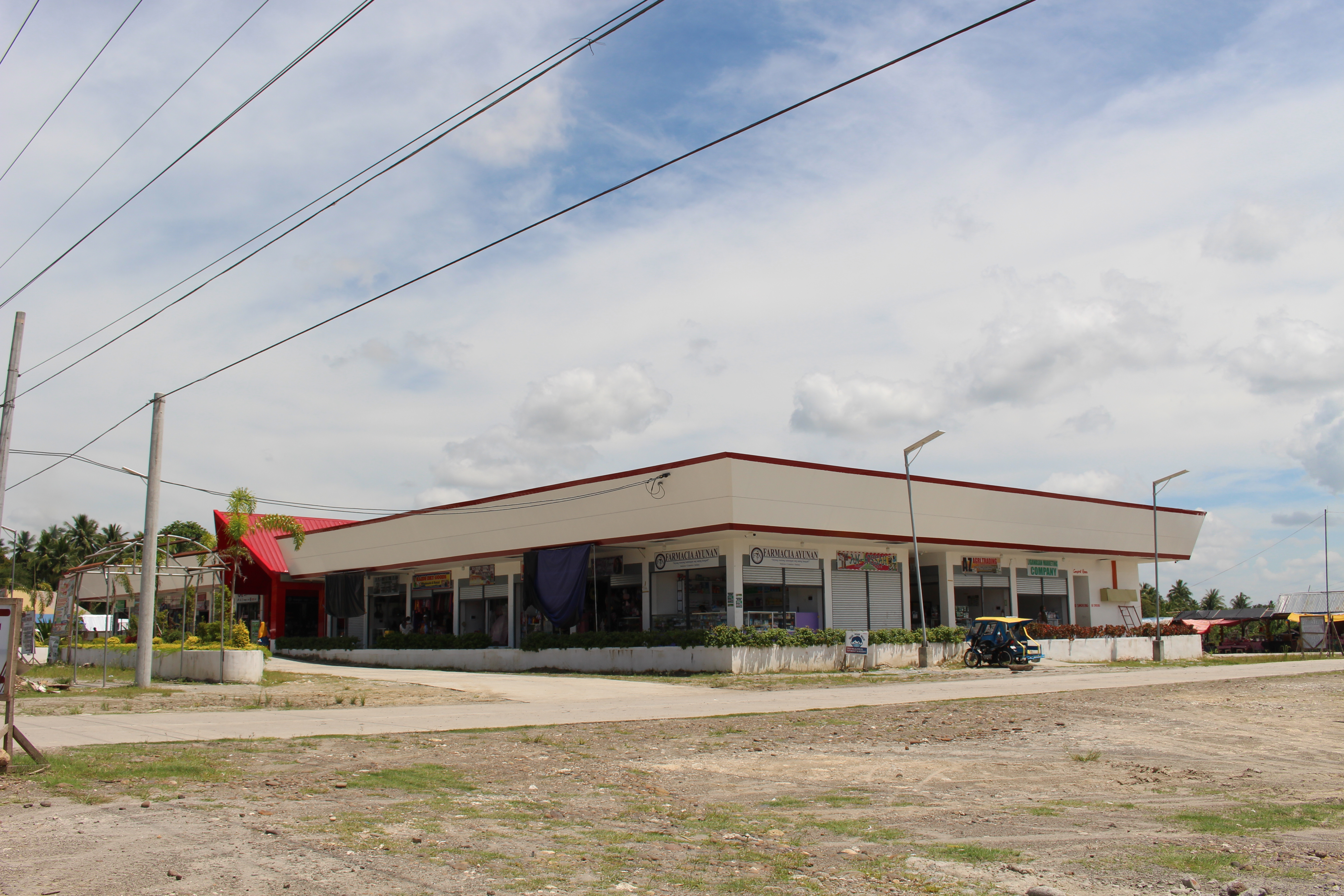
- Pagalungan Integrated Terminal

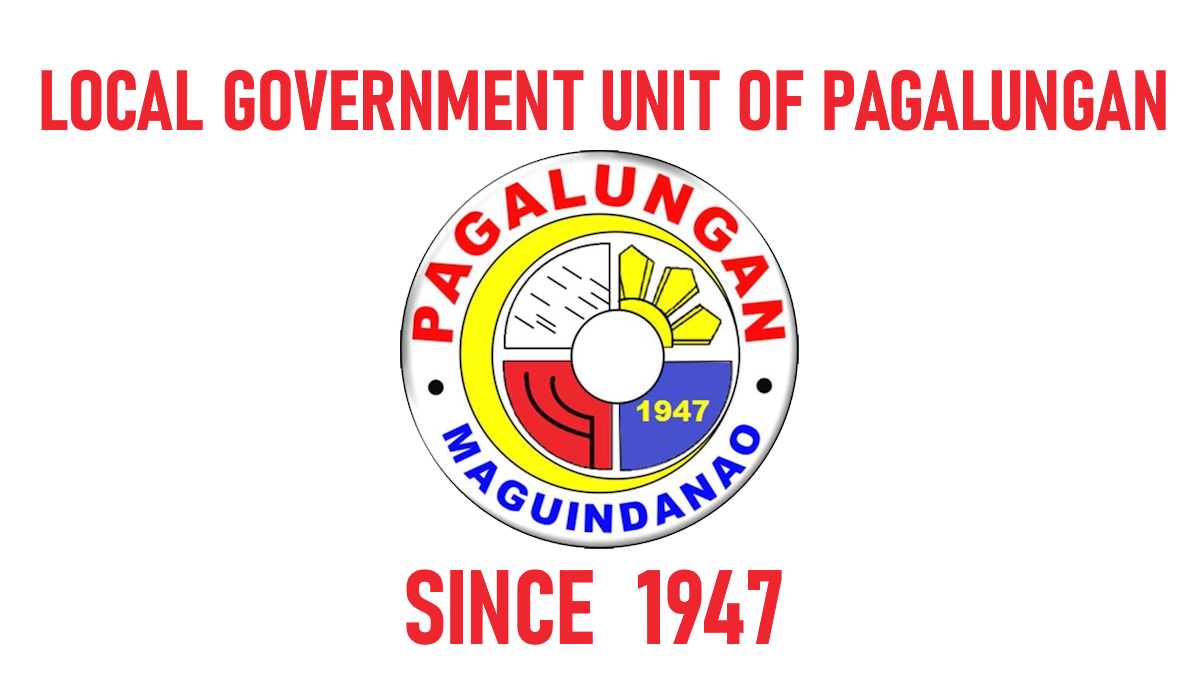
- Flag Seal

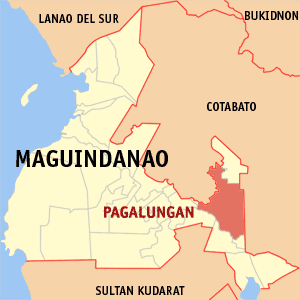
- Map of Maguindanao del Sur with Pagalungan highlighted
- Interactive map of Pagalungan
- Location within the Philippines
- Coordinates: 7°03′33″N 124°41′55″E
- Country: Philippines
- Region: Bangsamoro Autonomous Region in Muslim Mindanao
- Province: Maguindanao del Sur
- House district: Lone district
- Parliamentary district: 5th district
- Founded: August 18, 1947
- Barangays: 12 (see Barangays)

Government
  - Type: Sangguniang Bayan
  - Mayor: Abdilah G. Mamasabulod
  - Vice Mayor: Mohamiden G. Mamasabulod
  - House Representative: Mohamad P. Paglas Sr.
  - Municipal Council: Members: Salik P. Mamasabulod; Abdul A. Mamasabulod; Abdulbadi M. Timan; Jay M. Mamasabulod; Abraham B. Matalam; Eddie L. Murray; Arnel A. Matalam; Meriam M. Batua
  - Electorate: 28,609 voters (2025)

Area
  - Total: 898.76 km^{2} (347.01 sq mi)
- Elevation: 17 m (56 ft)
- Highest elevation: 162 m (531 ft)
- Lowest elevation: 4 m (13 ft)

Population (2024 census)
  - Total: 21,317
  - Density: 23.718/km^{2} (61.430/sq mi)
  - Households: 7,831

Economy
  - Income class: 1st municipal income class
  - Poverty incidence: 49.46% (2023)
  - Revenue: ₱ 406.8 million (2024)
  - Assets: ₱ 763.5 million (2024)
  - Expenditure: ₱ 378.5 million (2024)
  - Liabilities: ₱ 286.1 million (2024)

Service provider
  - Electricity: Maguindanao Electric Cooperative (MAGELCO)
- Time zone: UTC+8 (PST)
- ZIP code: 9610
- PSGC: 1903810000
- IDD : area code: +63 (0)64
- Native languages: Maguindanao; Tagalog
- Website: www.pagalungan.gov.ph

Pagalungan, officially the Municipality of Pagalungan (Maguindanaon: Inged nu Pagalungan, Jawi:ايڠد نو ڤݢلوڠن; Tagalog: Bayan ng Pagalungan), is a municipality in the province of Maguindanao del Sur, Bangsamoro, Philippines. According to the 2024 census, it had a population of 21,317.

== Etymology ==
“Pagalungan” is a Maguindanaon word for “mirror”. During the Spanish time, Pagalungan was a mere sitio. There was a small creek in it running towards a small pond called "Migkawa" by the natives of the place. The pond was deep and clear of which the women of the place used it as mirror. Today, the place and the entire municipality are known by the name of “Pagalungan”.

== History ==
Pagalungan was part of Midsayap municipality before it became a regular municipality on August 18, 1947, by virtue of Executive Order No. 41 issued during the administration of then President Manuel A. Roxas. The first appointed and elected mayor was the late Gorgonio P. Initan, a former public school teacher. The succeeding mayors were Datu Tumindig Sultan, 1950–1953; Hadji Abubacar Pendatun, 1954–1962; Bai Tonina P. Matalam Adil, 1963–1971, Datu Malunsing Matalam, 1972–1975; Datu Balumol P. Mama, 1975–1977; Bai Chito Matalam, 1973–1986, Datu Norodin M. Matalam, 1986–1988, Datu Udtog P. Matalam, Jr., 1988- December 16, 1995; Datu Macabangen K. Montawal, Dec.1995-June 2007; Datu Norodin M. Matalam, 2007–2013, and from the later date to present is Datu Salik P. Mamasabulod.

The municipality was the capital of the province of Cotabato, during the time which it encompasses the present-day provinces of Cotabato, Maguindanao del Norte, Maguindanao del Sur and Sultan Kudarat, from 1966 to 1973. During that time, at an estimated population of 30,000-40,000 in 1960, it was also the most populous municipality in the province, almost to be converted into a city during the decade, but internal conflicts and sporadic rebellions in its vicinity especially during 1970s and 1980s resulted in the somewhat stagnant population growth of the town until the foundation of ARMM in 1990 as some of its inhabitants fled towards parts of what was now the Soccsksargen region, particularly in what is now the Cotabato province, to avoid strife. The municipality ceased to be the capital of Cotabato province in 1973 as it was included as an integral part of the newly created province of Maguindanao, where it currently belongs today.

The municipality of Pagagawan (later renamed to Datu Montawal under Muslim Mindanao Autonomy Act No. 152 on June 9, 2003.) was carved out from Pagalungan town under Muslim Mindanao Autonomy Act No. 95 on July 18, 2000.

== Geography ==
=== Barangays ===
Pagalungan is politically subdivided into 12 barangays. Each barangay consists of puroks while some have sitios.

- Bagoenged
- Buliok
- Damalasak
- Galakit
- Inug-ug
- Kalbugan
- Kilangan
- Kudal
- Layog
- Linandangan
- Poblacion Mopak
- Dalgan

=== Climate ===
Climate data for Pagalungan, Maguindanao del Sur
Month	Jan	Feb	Mar	Apr	May	Jun	Jul	Aug	Sep	Oct	Nov	Dec	Year
Mean daily maximum °C (°F)	32 (90)	32 (90)	33 (91)	33 (91)	32 (90)	31 (88)	30 (86)	31 (88)	31 (88)	31 (88)	31 (88)	31 (88)	32 (89)
Mean daily minimum °C (°F)	21 (70)	21 (70)	21 (70)	22 (72)	23 (73)	23 (73)	23 (73)	23 (73)	23 (73)	23 (73)	23 (73)	22 (72)	22 (72)
Average precipitation mm (inches)	19 (0.7)	14 (0.6)	15 (0.6)	18 (0.7)	33 (1.3)	42 (1.7)	44 (1.7)	42 (1.7)	30 (1.2)	31 (1.2)	28 (1.1)	17 (0.7)	333 (13.2)
Average rainy days	6.9	5.6	6.9	8.1	15.1	17.5	17.8	18.5	14.9	14.9	12.4	8.0	146.6
Source: Meteoblue (modeled/calculated data, not measured locally)

== Demographics ==
Population census of Pagalungan
Year	Pop.	±% p.a.
1918	5,802	—
1939	13,322	+4.04%
1948	34,611	+11.19%
1960	15,672	−6.39%
1970	27,859	+5.91%
1975	24,788	−2.32%
1980	22,747	−1.70%
1990	42,495	+6.45%
1995	46,401	+1.66%
2000	25,908	−11.74%
2007	31,052	+2.53%
2010	31,891	+0.97%
2015	39,653	+4.24%
2020	46,277	+3.30%
2024	21,317	−16.98%
Source: Philippine Statistics Authority

== Economy ==
Poverty Incidence of Pagalungan

Source: Philippine Statistics Authority
