= Sultan sa Barongis =

Municipality in Maguindanao del Sur, Philippines

Sultan sa Barongis Lambayong
- Municipality
- Municipality of Sultan sa Barongis
- Municipal Hall

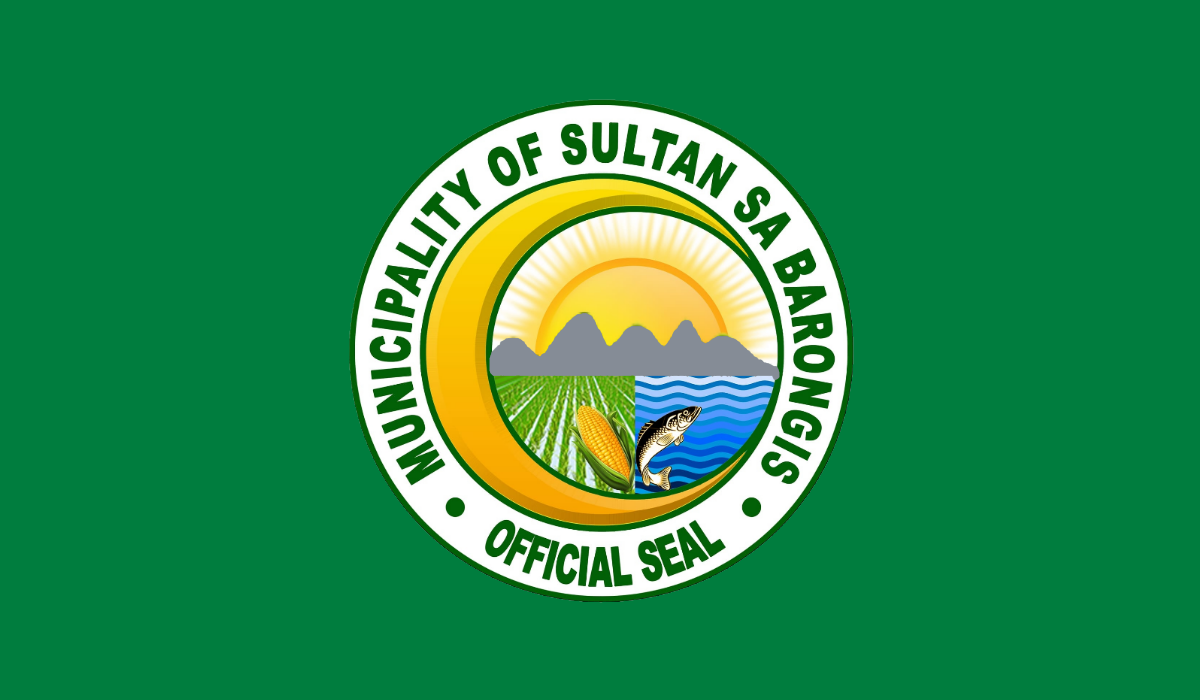
- Flag Seal

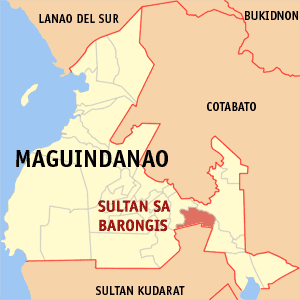
- Map of Maguindanao del Sur with Sultan sa Barongis highlighted
- Interactive map of Sultan sa Barongis
- Location within the Philippines
- Coordinates: 6°48′N 124°38′E
- Country: Philippines
- Region: Bangsamoro Autonomous Region in Muslim Mindanao
- Province: Maguindanao del Sur
- House district: Lone district
- Parliamentary district: 5th district
- Founded: October 29, 1952
- Barangays: 12 (see Barangays)

Government
  - Type: Sangguniang Bayan
  - Mayor: Allandatu M. Angas Sr.
  - Vice Mayor: Al-Fizzar Allandatu M. Angas
  - House Representative: Mohamad P. Paglas Sr.
  - Municipal Council: Members: Ramdatu Kautin M. Angas; Escotin M. Abdullah; Kedtayak U. Tunda; Pelais E. Sali; Badrin L. Kalonciang; Dhats B. Mamalo; Silongan K. Mamaluba; Tamunda S. Kalanduyan
  - Electorate: 16,961 voters (2025)

Area
  - Total: 291.30 km^{2} (112.47 sq mi)
- Elevation: 15 m (49 ft)
- Highest elevation: 36 m (118 ft)
- Lowest elevation: 6 m (20 ft)

Population (2024 census)
  - Total: 39,182
  - Density: 134.51/km^{2} (348.37/sq mi)
  - Households: 4,011

Economy
  - Income class: 3rd municipal income class
  - Poverty incidence: 50.67% (2023)
  - Revenue: ₱ 161 million (2024)
  - Assets: ₱ 80.45 million (2024)
  - Expenditure: ₱ 162.2 million (2024)
  - Liabilities: ₱ 10.5 million (2024)

Service provider
  - Electricity: Maguindanao Electric Cooperative (MAGELCO)
- Time zone: UTC+8 (PST)
- ZIP code: 9611
- PSGC: 1903813000
- IDD : area code: +63 (0)64
- Native languages: Maguindanao; Tagalog
- Website: www.sultansabarongis.gov.ph

Sultan sa Barongis, officially the Municipality of Sultan sa Barongis (Maguindanaon: Inged nu Sultan sa Barungis, Jawi: ايڠد نو سولتان س بروڠس; Tagalog: Bayan ng Sultan sa Barongis), is a municipality in the province of Maguindanao del Sur, Philippines. According to the 2024 census, it has a population of 39,182 people.

Sultan sa Barongis was initially known as Lambayong and was created on October 29, 1952 through Executive No. 543, signed by President Elpidio Quirino. It was carved from the municipality of Dulawan (now Datu Piang), and then renamed on June 21, 1959 after Mantagmama of the House of Talik, grandfather of lawyer, guerrilla leader, and politician, Salipada Pendatun.

In 2004, eleven barangays of Sultan sa Barongis were transferred to the municipality of Rajah Buayan, reducing the number of barangays from 23 to 12.

== Geography ==
=== Barangays ===
Sultan sa Barongis is politically subdivided into 12 barangays. Each barangay consists of puroks while some have sitios.

- Angkayamat
- Barurao
- Bulod
- Darampua
- Gadungan
- Kulambog
- Langgapanan
- Masulot
- Paldong
- Papakan
- Tugal
- Tukanakuden

=== Climate ===
Climate data for Sultan sa Barongis, Maguindanao del Sur
Month	Jan	Feb	Mar	Apr	May	Jun	Jul	Aug	Sep	Oct	Nov	Dec	Year
Mean daily maximum °C (°F)	31 (88)	31 (88)	32 (90)	32 (90)	31 (88)	30 (86)	30 (86)	30 (86)	30 (86)	30 (86)	30 (86)	31 (88)	31 (87)
Mean daily minimum °C (°F)	23 (73)	23 (73)	23 (73)	24 (75)	24 (75)	24 (75)	24 (75)	24 (75)	24 (75)	24 (75)	24 (75)	24 (75)	24 (75)
Average precipitation mm (inches)	64 (2.5)	45 (1.8)	59 (2.3)	71 (2.8)	140 (5.5)	179 (7.0)	192 (7.6)	198 (7.8)	163 (6.4)	147 (5.8)	113 (4.4)	66 (2.6)	1,437 (56.5)
Average rainy days	12.2	10.3	12.7	15.7	26.0	27.4	28.1	28.2	26.0	26.7	22.9	16.6	252.8
Source: Meteoblue (modeled/calculated data, not measured locally)

== Demographics ==
Population census of Sultan sa Barongis
Year	Pop.	±% p.a.
1960	40,347	—
1970	45,421	+1.19%
1975	17,630	−17.29%
1980	25,957	+8.04%
1990	29,916	+1.43%
1995	29,967	+0.03%
2000	34,709	+3.20%
2007	25,767	−4.03%
2010	22,547	−4.74%
2015	22,425	−0.10%
2020	24,476	+1.86%
2024	39,182	+11.96%
Source: Philippine Statistics Authority

== Economy ==
Poverty Incidence of Sultan sa Barongis

Source: Philippine Statistics Authority

== See also ==
- List of renamed cities and municipalities in the Philippines
