= Datu Paglas =

Municipality in Maguindanao del Sur, Philippines

- Municipality
- Municipality of Datu Paglas
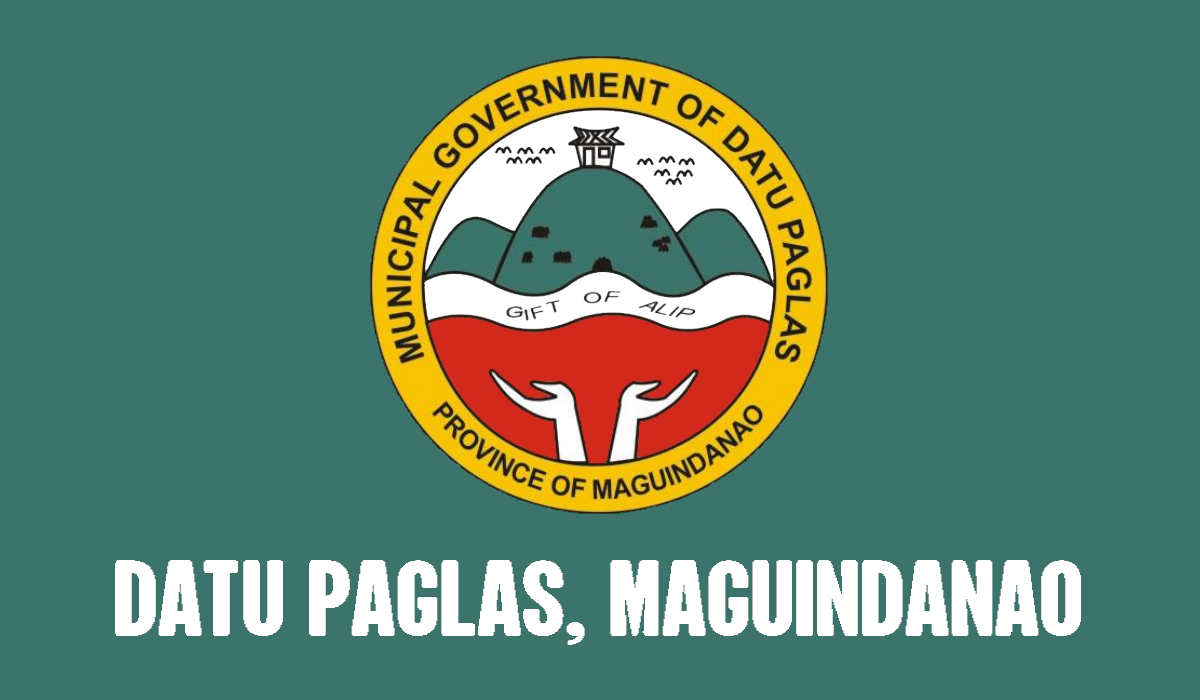
- Flag Seal

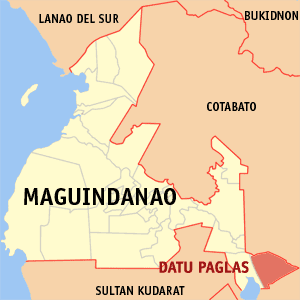
- Map of Maguindanao del Sur with Datu Paglas highlighted
- Interactive map of Datu Paglas
- Location within the Philippines
- Coordinates: 6°46′01″N 124°51′00″E
- Country: Philippines
- Region: Bangsamoro Autonomous Region in Muslim Mindanao
- Province: Maguindanao del Sur
- House district: Lone district
- Parliamentary district: 4th district
- Founded: November 22, 1973
- Named for: Datu Ibrahim Paglas Sr.
- Barangays: 23 (see Barangays)

Government
  - Type: Sangguniang Bayan
  - Mayor: Abubakar P. Paglas
  - Vice Mayor: Ibrahim P. Paglas IV
  - House Representative: Mohamad P. Paglas Sr.
  - Municipal Council: Members: Mossaiddi-in P. Dimapalao; Maaruf M. Nando; Anuar M. Pompong; Samir N. Alim; Armando S. Tocao; Eskak B. Makungay; Lukman T. Bukol; Saidali O. Akmad
  - Electorate: 24,932 voters (2025)

Area
  - Total: 132.10 km^{2} (51.00 sq mi)
- Elevation: 63 m (207 ft)
- Highest elevation: 575 m (1,886 ft)
- Lowest elevation: 11 m (36 ft)

Population (2024 census)
  - Total: 38,446
  - Density: 291.04/km^{2} (753.78/sq mi)
  - Households: 5,588

Economy
  - Income class: 3rd municipal income class
  - Poverty incidence: 45.21% (2023)
  - Revenue: ₱ 178.9 million (2024)
  - Assets: ₱ 328.3 million (2024)
  - Expenditure: ₱ 166.1 million (2024)
  - Liabilities: ₱ 1.815 million (2024)

Service provider
  - Electricity: Sultan Kudarat Electric Cooperative (SUKELCO)
- Time zone: UTC+8 (PST)
- ZIP code: 9617
- PSGC: 1903805000
- IDD : area code: +63 (0)64
- Native languages: Maguindanao; Tagalog

Datu Paglas, officially the Municipality of Datu Paglas (Maguindanaon: Ingud nu Datu Paglas; Iranun: Inged a Datu Paglas; Tagalog: Bayan ng Datu Paglas), is a municipality in the province of Maguindanao del Sur, Philippines. According to the 2024 census, it had a population of 38,446.

== History ==
Datu Paglas was created out of 7 northern barangays of the municipality of Columbio on November 22, 1973, by Presidential Decree No. 340. While Columbio was made part of the province of Sultan Kudarat, Datu Paglas was made part of the province of Maguindanao.

In 2021, Bangsamoro Islamic Freedom Fighters occupied the market.

== Geography ==
=== Barangays ===
Datu Paglas is politically subdivided into 23 barangays. Each barangay consists of puroks while some have sitios.

- Alip (Poblacion)
- Bonawan
- Bulod
- Damalusay
- Damawato
- Datang
- Elbebe
- Kalumenga (Kalumanga)
- Katil
- Lipao
- Lomoyon
- Madidis
- Makat
- Malala
- Mangadeg
- Manindolo
- Mao
- Napok
- Palao sa Buto
- Poblacion
- Puya
- Salendab
- Sepaka

=== Climate ===
Climate data for Datu Paglas, Maguindanao del Sur
Month	Jan	Feb	Mar	Apr	May	Jun	Jul	Aug	Sep	Oct	Nov	Dec	Year
Mean daily maximum °C (°F)	31 (88)	31 (88)	32 (90)	32 (90)	31 (88)	30 (86)	30 (86)	30 (86)	30 (86)	30 (86)	30 (86)	31 (88)	31 (87)
Mean daily minimum °C (°F)	23 (73)	23 (73)	23 (73)	24 (75)	24 (75)	24 (75)	24 (75)	24 (75)	24 (75)	24 (75)	24 (75)	24 (75)	24 (75)
Average precipitation mm (inches)	64 (2.5)	45 (1.8)	59 (2.3)	71 (2.8)	140 (5.5)	179 (7.0)	192 (7.6)	198 (7.8)	163 (6.4)	147 (5.8)	113 (4.4)	66 (2.6)	1,437 (56.5)
Average rainy days	12.2	10.3	12.7	15.7	26.0	27.4	28.1	28.2	26.0	26.7	22.9	16.6	252.8
Source: Meteoblue (modeled/calculated data, not measured locally)

== Demographics ==
Population census of Datu Paglas
Year	Pop.	±% p.a.
1975	6,816	—
1980	8,262	+3.92%
1990	13,970	+5.39%
1995	15,522	+1.99%
2000	20,014	+5.60%
2007	29,979	+5.73%
2010	20,290	−13.24%
2015	28,387	+6.60%
2020	33,682	+3.67%
2024	38,446	+3.23%
Source: Philippine Statistics Authority

== Economy ==
Poverty Incidence of Datu Paglas

Source: Philippine Statistics Authority

== Notable people ==
- Lav Diaz, filmmaker
