= General Salipada K. Pendatun, Maguindanao del Sur =

Municipality in Maguindanao del Sur, Philippines

General Salipada K. Pendatun
- Municipality
- Municipality of General Salipada K. Pendatun
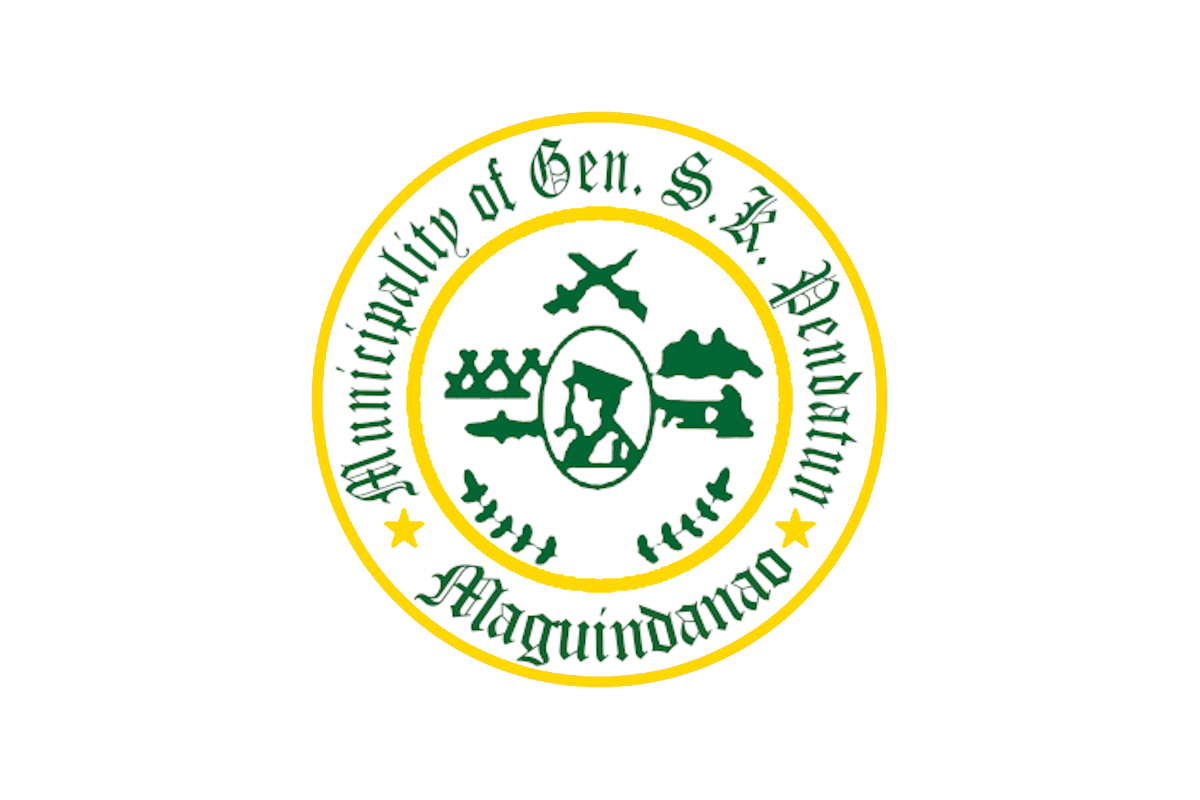
- Flag Seal

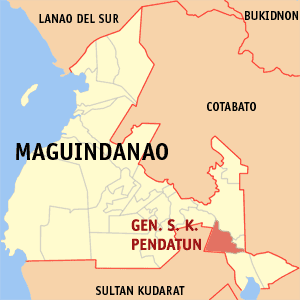
- Map of Maguindanao del Sur with General Salipada K. Pendatun highlighted
- Interactive map of General Salipada K. Pendatun
- Location within the Philippines
- Coordinates: 6°49′38″N 124°45′15″E
- Country: Philippines
- Region: Bangsamoro Autonomous Region in Muslim Mindanao
- Province: Maguindanao del Sur
- House district: Lone district
- Parliamentary district: 5th district
- Founded: April 7, 1991
- Named for: Salipada Pendatun
- Barangays: 19 (see Barangays)

Government
  - Type: Sangguniang Bayan
  - Mayor: Rafsanjani P. Ali
  - Vice Mayor: Norodin P. Masukat
  - House Representative: Mohamad P. Paglas Sr.
  - Municipal Council: Members: Romaya L. Pendatun; Salman T. Kali; Tarik-Adziz I. Maneged; Sadhat M. Abdullah; Mylah N. Pendatun; Mama M. Masulot; Norudin A. Pendatun; Nasrudin K. Datulangalen
  - Electorate: 21,326 voters (2025)

Area
  - Total: 189.37 km^{2} (73.12 sq mi)
- Elevation: 11 m (36 ft)
- Highest elevation: 38 m (125 ft)
- Lowest elevation: 5 m (16 ft)

Population (2024 census)
  - Total: 31,263
  - Density: 165.09/km^{2} (427.58/sq mi)
  - Households: 4,906

Economy
  - Income class: 2nd municipal income class
  - Poverty incidence: 56.32% (2023)
  - Revenue: ₱ 173.1 million (2024)
  - Assets: ₱ 109.7 million (2024)
  - Expenditure: ₱ 143.3 million (2024)
  - Liabilities: ₱ 2.187 million (2024)

Service provider
  - Electricity: Sultan Kudarat Electric Cooperative (SUKELCO)
- Time zone: UTC+8 (PST)
- ZIP code: 9618
- PSGC: 1903819000
- IDD : area code: +63 (0)64
- Native languages: Maguindanao; Tagalog
- Website: www.genskpendatun.gov.ph

General Salipada K. Pendatun, officially the Municipality of General Salipada K. Pendatun (Maguindanaon: Inged nu General Salipada K. Pendatun; Iranun: Inged a General Salipada K. Pendatun; Tagalog: Bayan ng Heneral Salipada K. Pendatun), is a municipality in the province of Maguindanao del Sur, Philippines. According to the 2024 census, it has a population of 33,710 people.

It is named after General Salipada K. Pendatun (1912 – 1985), who was a forerunner Mindanaoan Legislator and General during the Second World War.

== History ==
On April 7, 1991, Muslim Mindanao Autonomy Act No. 3 created the Municipality of General S. K. Pendatun out of the municipality of Buluan, making it the first local government unit created by the ARMM Regional Assembly. The municipality of Paglat was created out of four of its barangays on September 29, 2001.

== Geography ==
=== Barangays ===
General Salipada K. Pendatun is politically subdivided into 19 barangays. Each barangay consists of puroks while some have sitios.

- Badak
- Bulod
- Kaladturan
- Kulasi
- Lao-lao
- Lasangan
- Lower Idtig
- Lumabao
- Makainis
- Midconding
- Midpandacan
- Panosolen
- Pidtiguian
- Quipolot
- Ramcor
- Sadangin
- Sumakubay
- Tonggol
- Upper Lasangan

=== Climate ===
Climate data for General Salipada K. Pendatun, Maguindanao del Sur
Month	Jan	Feb	Mar	Apr	May	Jun	Jul	Aug	Sep	Oct	Nov	Dec	Year
Mean daily maximum °C (°F)	31 (88)	31 (88)	32 (90)	32 (90)	31 (88)	30 (86)	30 (86)	30 (86)	30 (86)	30 (86)	30 (86)	31 (88)	31 (87)
Mean daily minimum °C (°F)	23 (73)	23 (73)	23 (73)	24 (75)	24 (75)	24 (75)	24 (75)	24 (75)	24 (75)	24 (75)	24 (75)	24 (75)	24 (75)
Average precipitation mm (inches)	64 (2.5)	45 (1.8)	59 (2.3)	71 (2.8)	140 (5.5)	179 (7.0)	192 (7.6)	198 (7.8)	163 (6.4)	147 (5.8)	113 (4.4)	66 (2.6)	1,437 (56.5)
Average rainy days	12.2	10.3	12.7	15.7	26.0	27.4	28.1	28.2	26.0	26.7	22.9	16.6	252.8
Source: Meteoblue (modeled/calculated data, not measured locally)

== Demographics ==
Population census of General Salipada K. Pendatun
Year	Pop.	±% p.a.
1995	20,280	—
2000	28,374	+7.46%
2007	36,038	+3.35%
2010	24,004	−13.75%
2015	28,103	+3.05%
2020	31,263	+2.27%
2024	33,710	+1.83%
Source: Philippine Statistics Authority

== Economy ==
Poverty Incidence of General Salipada K. Pendatun

Source: Philippine Statistics Authority
