= Datu Montawal =

Municipality in Maguindanao del Sur, Philippines

Datu Montawal Pagagawan
- Municipality
- Municipality of Datu Montawal
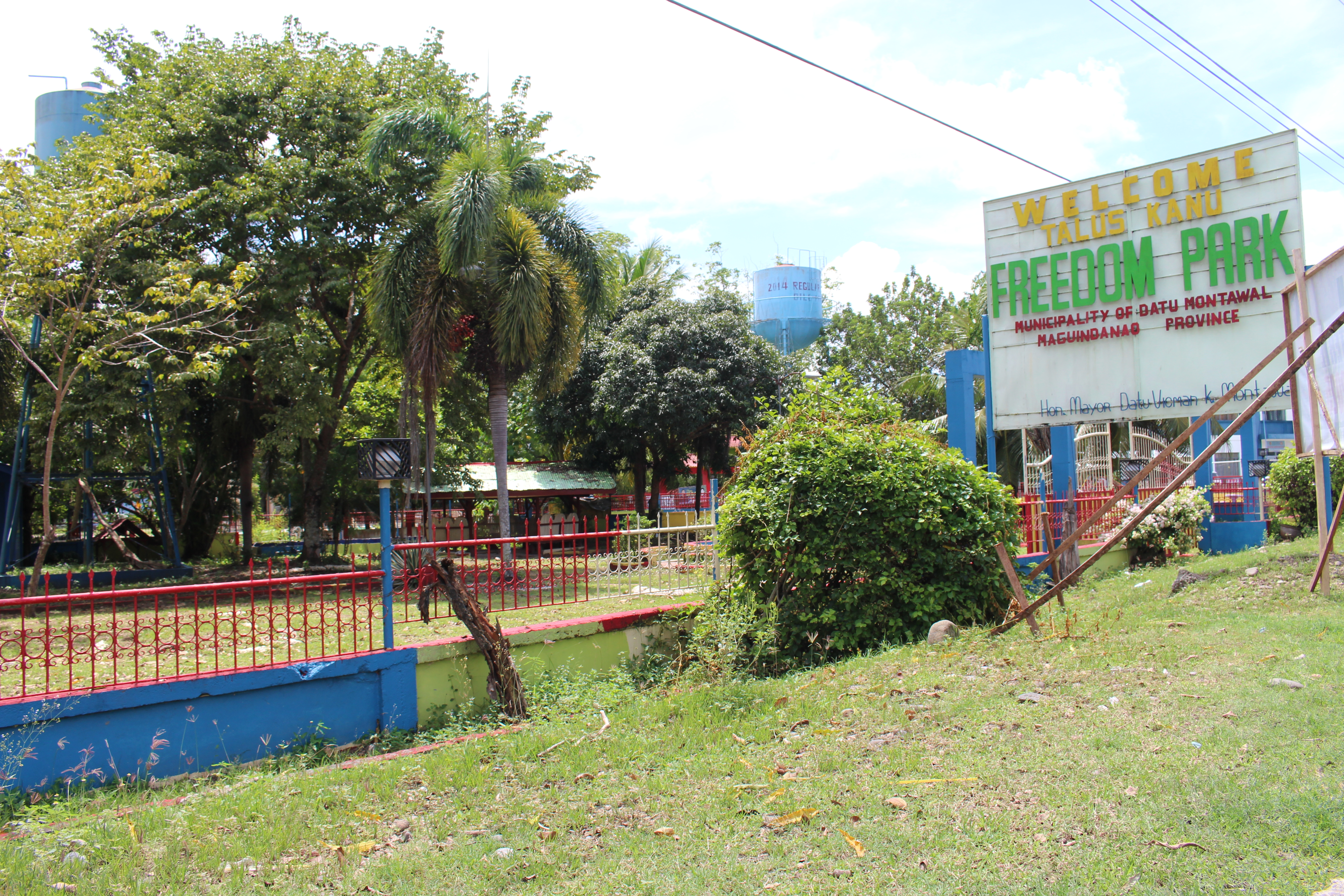
- Freedom Park

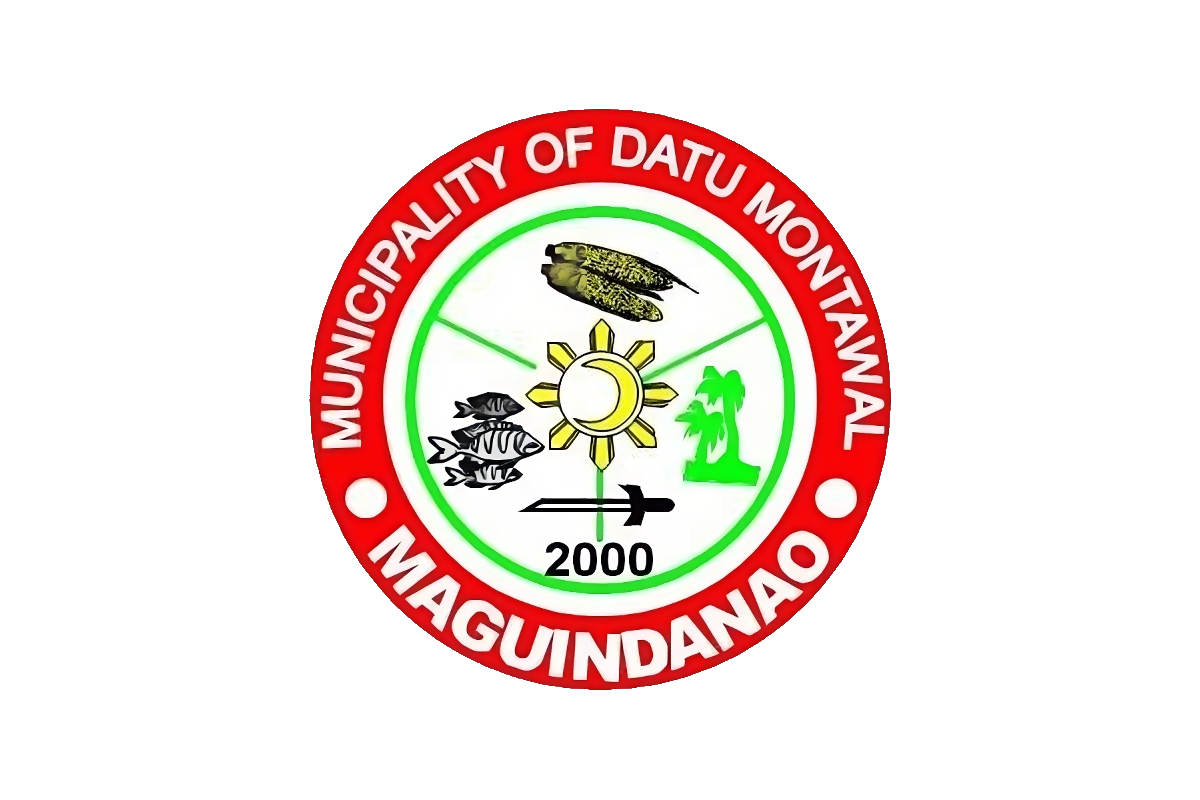
- Flag Seal

- Map of Maguindanao del Sur with Datu Montawal highlighted
- Interactive map of Datu Montawal
- Location within the Philippines
- Coordinates: 7°06′N 124°46′E
- Country: Philippines
- Region: Bangsamoro Autonomous Region in Muslim Mindanao
- Province: Maguindanao del Sur
- House district: Lone district
- Parliamentary district: 5th district
- Founded: July 18, 2000
- Named for: Datu Macabangen K. Montawal
- Barangays: 11 (see Barangays)

Government
  - Type: Sangguniang Bayan
  - Mayor: Ohto C. Montawal
  - Vice Mayor: Vicman K. Montawal
  - House Representative: Mohamad P. Paglas Sr.
  - Municipal Council: Members: Mubarac M. Abubakar; Abdila M. Kakim; Jasmerudin M. Mangadad; Hussain S. Esmael; Datu Kautin C. Montawal; Jolicies B. Montawal; Esmail G. Mindalagat; Yussof M. Montawal Jr.
  - Electorate: 21,472 voters (2025)

Area
  - Total: 461.10 km^{2} (178.03 sq mi)
- Elevation: 14 m (46 ft)
- Highest elevation: 36 m (118 ft)
- Lowest elevation: 8 m (26 ft)

Population (2024 census)
  - Total: 37,314
  - Density: 80.924/km^{2} (209.59/sq mi)
  - Households: 6,019

Economy
  - Income class: 2nd municipal income class
  - Poverty incidence: 56.42% (2023)
  - Revenue: ₱ 159.8 million (2024)
  - Assets: ₱ 108.9 million (2024)
  - Expenditure: ₱ 146.6 million (2024)
  - Liabilities: ₱ 6.945 million (2024)

Service provider
  - Electricity: Maguindanao Electric Cooperative (MAGELCO)
- Time zone: UTC+8 (PST)
- ZIP code: 9610
- PSGC: 1903822000
- IDD : area code: +63 (0)64
- Native languages: Maguindanao; Ilianen; Tagalog

Datu Montawal, officially the Municipality of Datu Montawal (Maguindanaon: Ingud nu Datu Montawal; Iranun: Inged a Datu Montawal; Tagalog: Bayan ng Datu Montawal), and through its de jure name Pagagawan, is a municipality in the province of Maguindanao del Sur, Philippines. According to the 2024 census, it has a population of 42,181 people.

The municipality was created under Muslim Mindanao Autonomy Act No. 95 on July 18, 2000, carved out of the municipality of Pagalungan. Muslim Mindanao Autonomy Act No. 152 mandated to rename the municipality as Datu Montawal on June 9, 2003.. Despite continuous usage of this name by the municipal, provincial and regional government, and its inclusion to Republic Act No. 11550 (Act creating the Provinces of Maguindanao del Norte and Maguindanao del Norte), no record of a plebiscite was held to affirm the renaming, while the national entities such as Commission on Elections and the Philippine Statistics Authority uses the de jure name Pagagawan.

== Geography ==
=== Barangays ===
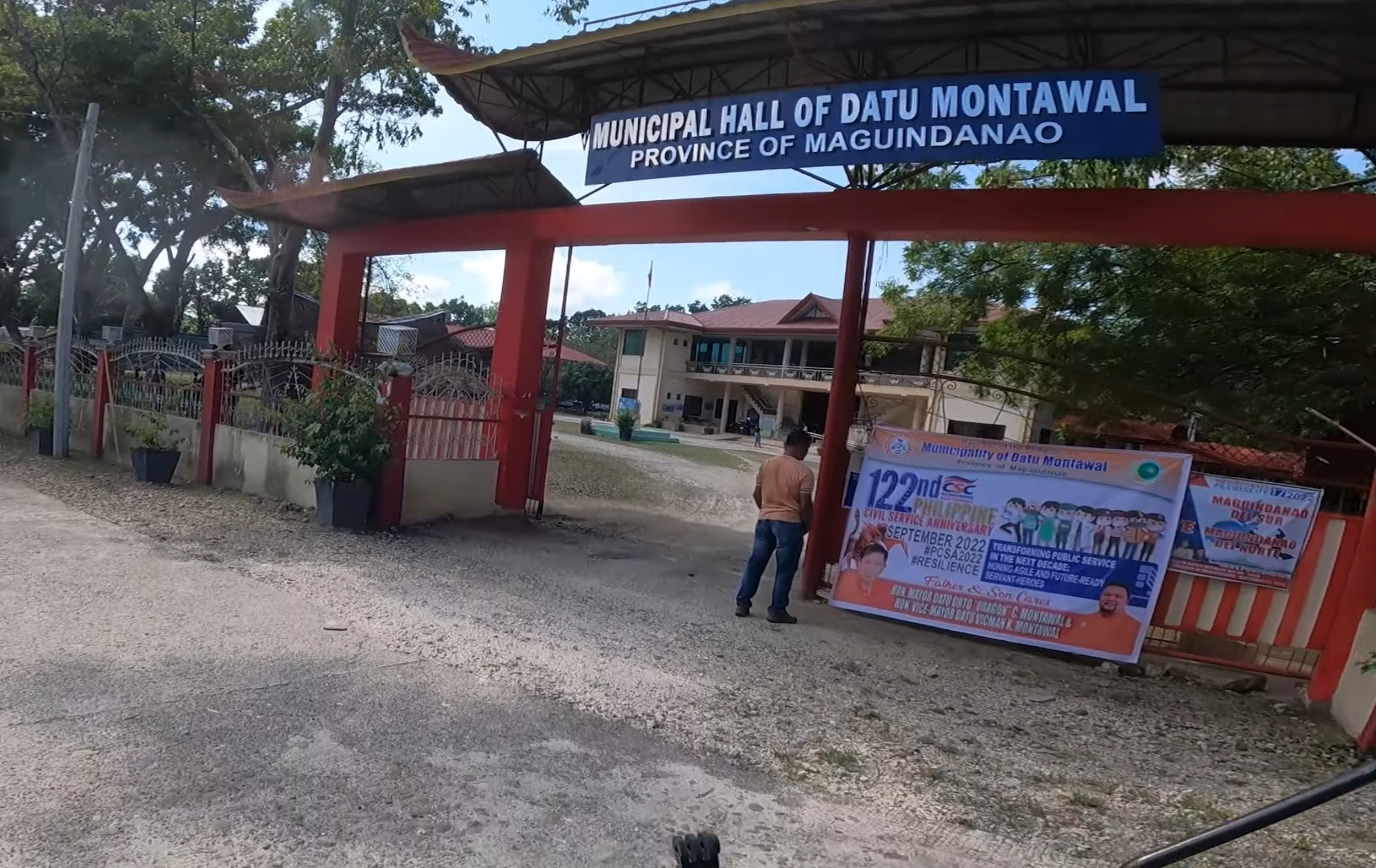
Municipal Hall of Datu Montawal

Datu Montawal is politically subdivided into 11 barangays. Each barangay consists of puroks while some have sitios.

- Balatungkayo (Batungkayo)
- Bulit
- Bulod
- Dungguan
- Limbalud
- Maridagao
- Nabundas
- Pagagawan
- Talapas
- Talitay
- Tunggol

=== Climate ===
Climate data for Datu Montawal, Maguindanao del Sur
Month	Jan	Feb	Mar	Apr	May	Jun	Jul	Aug	Sep	Oct	Nov	Dec	Year
Mean daily maximum °C (°F)	32 (90)	32 (90)	33 (91)	33 (91)	32 (90)	31 (88)	30 (86)	31 (88)	31 (88)	31 (88)	31 (88)	31 (88)	32 (89)
Mean daily minimum °C (°F)	21 (70)	21 (70)	21 (70)	22 (72)	23 (73)	23 (73)	23 (73)	23 (73)	23 (73)	23 (73)	23 (73)	22 (72)	22 (72)
Average precipitation mm (inches)	19 (0.7)	14 (0.6)	15 (0.6)	18 (0.7)	33 (1.3)	42 (1.7)	44 (1.7)	42 (1.7)	30 (1.2)	31 (1.2)	28 (1.1)	17 (0.7)	333 (13.2)
Average rainy days	6.9	5.6	6.9	8.1	15.1	17.5	17.8	18.5	14.9	14.9	12.4	8.0	146.6
Source: Meteoblue (modeled/calculated data, not measured locally)

== Demographics ==
Population census of Datu Montawal
Year	Pop.	±% p.a.
2000	27,010	—
2007	32,995	+2.80%
2010	31,265	−1.94%
2015	34,820	+2.07%
2020	37,314	+1.47%
2024	42,181	+2.99%
Source: Philippine Statistics Authority

== Economy ==
Poverty Incidence of Datu Montawal

Source: Philippine Statistics Authority
