= Datu Piang, Maguindanao del Sur =

Municipality in Maguindanao del Sur, Philippines

Datu Piang Dulawan
- Municipality
- Municipality of Datu Piang
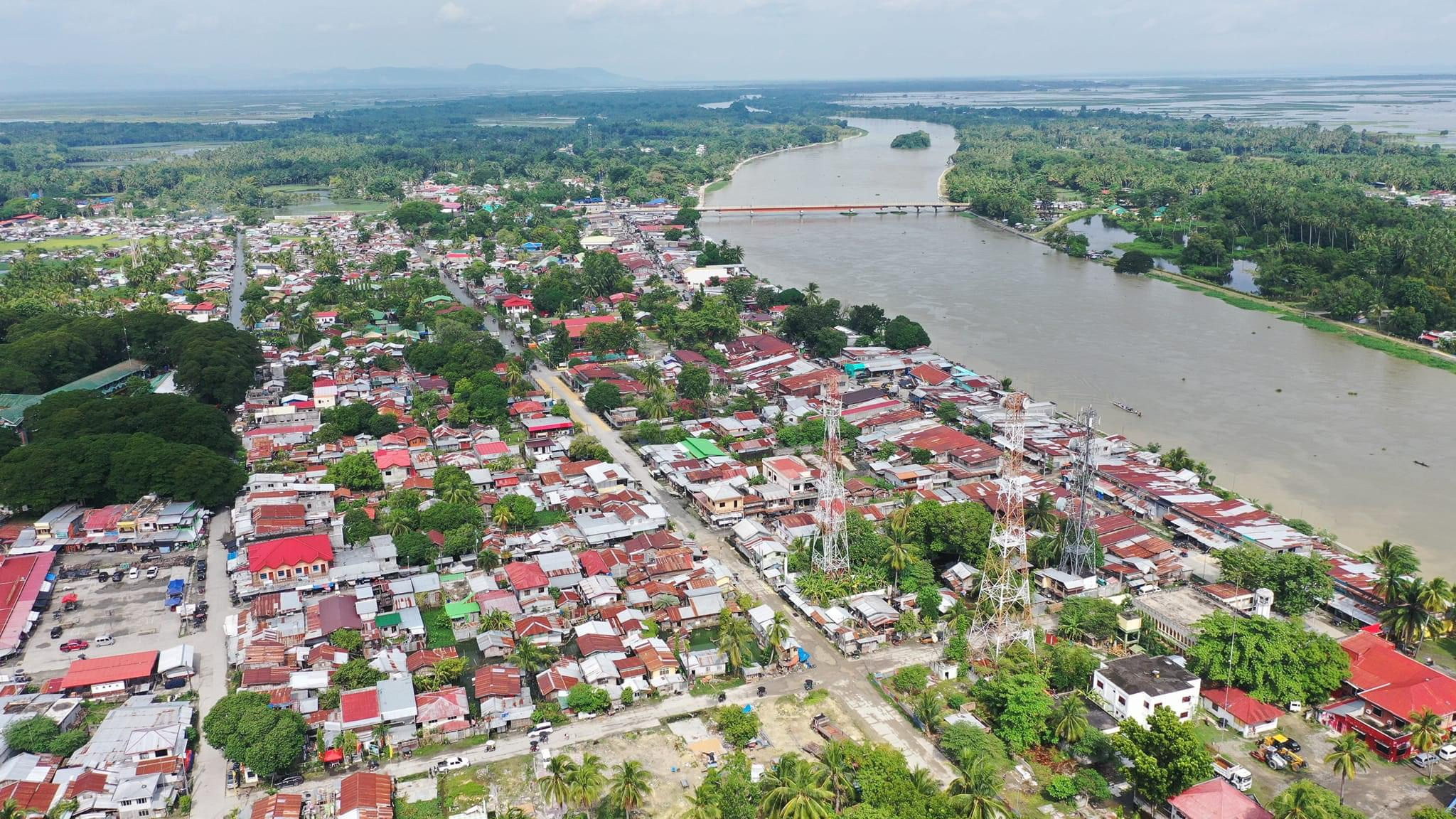
- Datu Piang Aerial View, 2024

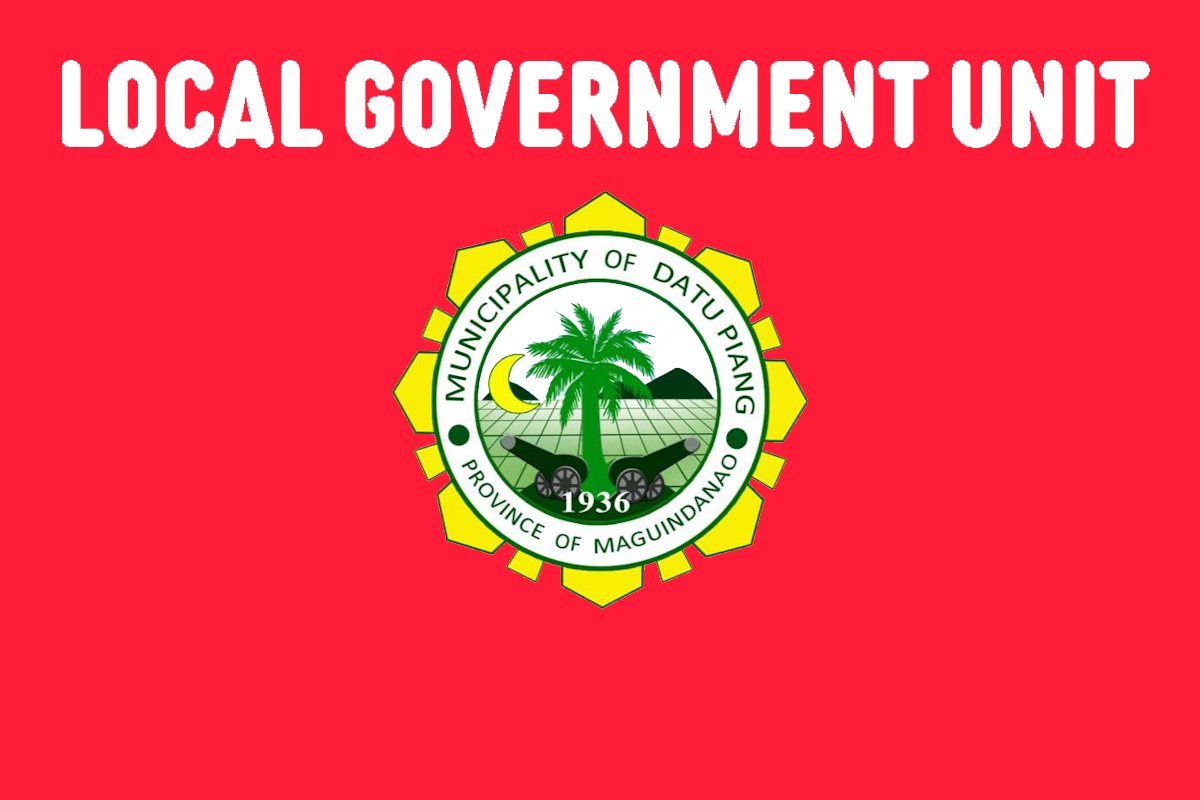
- Flag Seal

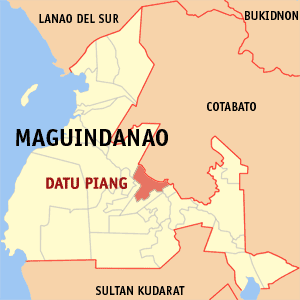
- Datu Piang in Maguindanao del Sur
- Interactive map of Datu Piang
- Location within the Philippines
- Coordinates: 7°01′32″N 124°30′15″E
- Country: Philippines
- Region: Bangsamoro Autonomous Region in Muslim Mindanao
- Province: Maguindanao del Sur
- House district: Lone district
- Parliamentary district: 2nd district
- Founded: November 25, 1936
- Barangays: 16 (see Barangays)

Government
  - Type: Sangguniang Bayan
  - Mayor: Victor T. Samama
  - Vice Mayor: Mohammad Omar A. Samama
  - House Representative: Mohamad P. Paglas Sr.
  - Municipal Council: Members: Genuine P. Kamaong II; Datupia M. Tukuran; Nasser T. Abdul; Noel T. Samama; Harristang K. Kasim; Thong M. Asim; Salipada A. Abubakar; Mohammad Raiz U. Andamen
  - Electorate: 19,290 voters (2025)

Area
  - Total: 302.97 km^{2} (116.98 sq mi)
- Elevation: 9.0 m (29.5 ft)
- Highest elevation: 91 m (299 ft)
- Lowest elevation: −2 m (−6.6 ft)

Population (2024 census)
  - Total: 31,063
  - Density: 102.53/km^{2} (265.55/sq mi)
  - Households: 4,647

Economy
  - Income class: 2nd municipal income class
  - Poverty incidence: 48.05% (2023)
  - Revenue: ₱ 177.4 million (2024)
  - Assets: ₱ 227.9 million (2024)
  - Expenditure: ₱ 160.6 million (2024)
  - Liabilities: ₱ 160.4 million (2024)

Service provider
  - Electricity: Maguindanao Electric Cooperative (MAGELCO)
- Time zone: UTC+8 (PST)
- ZIP code: 9607
- PSGC: 1903806000
- IDD : area code: +63 (0)64
- Native languages: Maguindanao; Tagalog
- Website: www.datupiang.gov.ph

Datu Piang, officially the Municipality of Datu Piang (Maguindanaon: Inged nu Datu Piang, Jawi:داتوڤياڠ ايڠد نو; Tagalog: Bayan ng Datu Piang), is a municipality in the province of Maguindanao del Sur, Philippines. According to the 2024 census, it had a population of 31,063.

It was formerly known as Dulawan.

== History ==
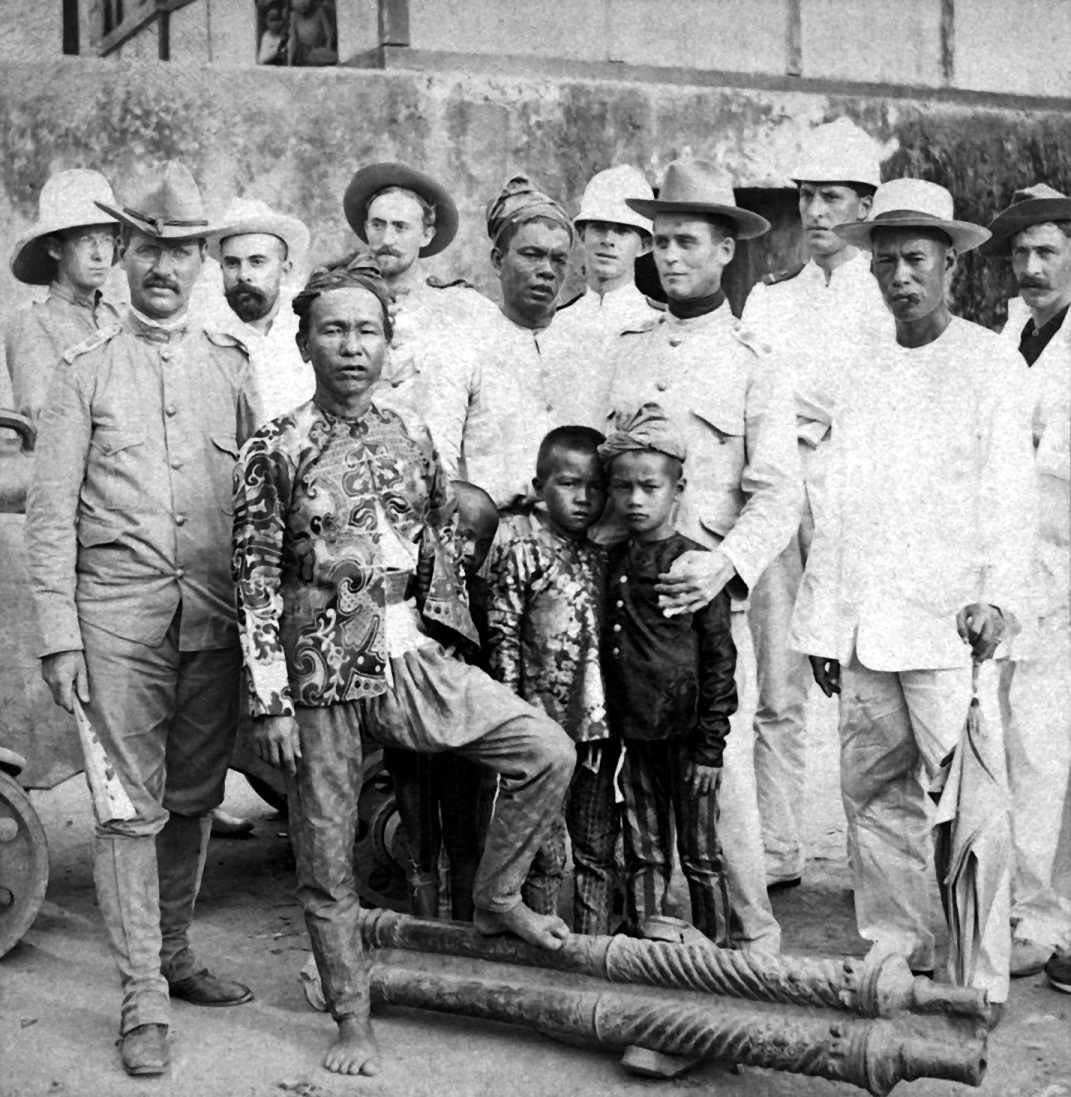
Datu Piang (fourth from left) with American officers, 1899

=== Sultanate of Buayan ===
Buayan was centered in what is now the center of Datu Piang, created by the Rio Grande de Mindanao (or Pulangi) River, 30 km upstream from the Sultanate of Maguindanao. It was a powerful state that rivaled the Sultanate of Maguindanao on influence and trade. In the 1860s, the main stronghold of Buayan was transferred to Bacat, within the modern-day municipality of Rajah Buayan.

=== Modern era ===
Created as Dulawan on November 25, 1936, by Executive Order No. 66 of Pres. Manuel L. Quezon, the municipality covered a large area of what is now parts of Maguindanao del Norte and Maguindanao del Sur, and northern Sultan Kudarat. It is among the first municipalities of the old Cotabato province. Republic Act No. 1035, enacted on June 12, 1954, renamed the town to Datu Piang, after an influential Muslim leader from the region during the American colonial period.

In 1959, a large southern territory was made into the municipality of Ampatuan. Four years later the municipality of Maganoy was carved out its territory, which later on became the capital of Maguindanao, of which it was made part of on November 22, 1973. Its remaining south-western barangays were merged with other barangays of Dinaig to form the municipality of Talayan in 1976. Its area was reduced again on July 1, 2003, when 14 of its south-eastern barangays were separated to form the municipality of Datu Saudi Ampatuan.

On July 30, 2009, upon the ratification of Muslim Mindanao Autonomy Acts No. 225 (as amended by MMAA 252) and MMAA 222 (as amended by MMAA 253), the municipalities of Shariff Saydona Mustapha and Datu Salibo, respectively, were created from a total of 5 entire barangays and portions of 10 barangays from Datu Piang, in addition to other barangays from Datu Saudi Ampatuan, Datu Unsay, Mamasapano and Shariff Aguak.

On December 3, 2020, at around 10:45 in the evening, around 100 members of the Bangsamoro Islamic Freedom Fighters (BIFF) attacked and assaulted three Philippine Army detachments in the municipality. The firefight lasted for about an hour and a grenade was thrown at a police car which caught fire and exploded. There were no reported civilian and military casualties. On December 11, the Philippine National Police filed complaints for multiple frustrated murder and destructive arson against more than a hundred BIFF leaders and members responsible for the attack.

== Geography ==
=== Barangays ===
Datu Piang is politically subdivided into 16 barangays. Each barangay consists of puroks while some have sitios.

- Alonganan
- Ambadao
- Balanakan
- Balong
- Buayan (Rajah Buayan Mopak)
- Dado
- Damabalas
- Duaminanga
- Kalipapa (Mopak)
- Kanguan (Note: Created by MMA ACT. NO. 232 on December 6, 2008)
- Liong
- Magaslong
- Masigay
- Montay
- Poblacion (Dulawan)
- Reina Regente

=== Climate ===
Climate data for Datu Piang, Maguindanao del Sur
Month	Jan	Feb	Mar	Apr	May	Jun	Jul	Aug	Sep	Oct	Nov	Dec	Year
Mean daily maximum °C (°F)	32 (90)	32 (90)	33 (91)	33 (91)	32 (90)	31 (88)	30 (86)	31 (88)	31 (88)	31 (88)	31 (88)	31 (88)	32 (89)
Mean daily minimum °C (°F)	21 (70)	21 (70)	21 (70)	22 (72)	23 (73)	23 (73)	23 (73)	23 (73)	23 (73)	23 (73)	23 (73)	22 (72)	22 (72)
Average rainfall mm (inches)	141 (5.6)	102 (4.0)	116 (4.6)	121 (4.8)	216 (8.5)	229 (9.0)	225 (8.9)	199 (7.8)	183 (7.2)	218 (8.6)	158 (6.2)	126 (5.0)	2,034 (80.2)
Average rainy days	6.9	5.6	6.9	8.1	15.1	17.5	17.8	18.5	14.9	14.9	12.4	8.0	146.6
Source: Meteoblue (modeled/calculated data, not measured locally)

== Demographics ==
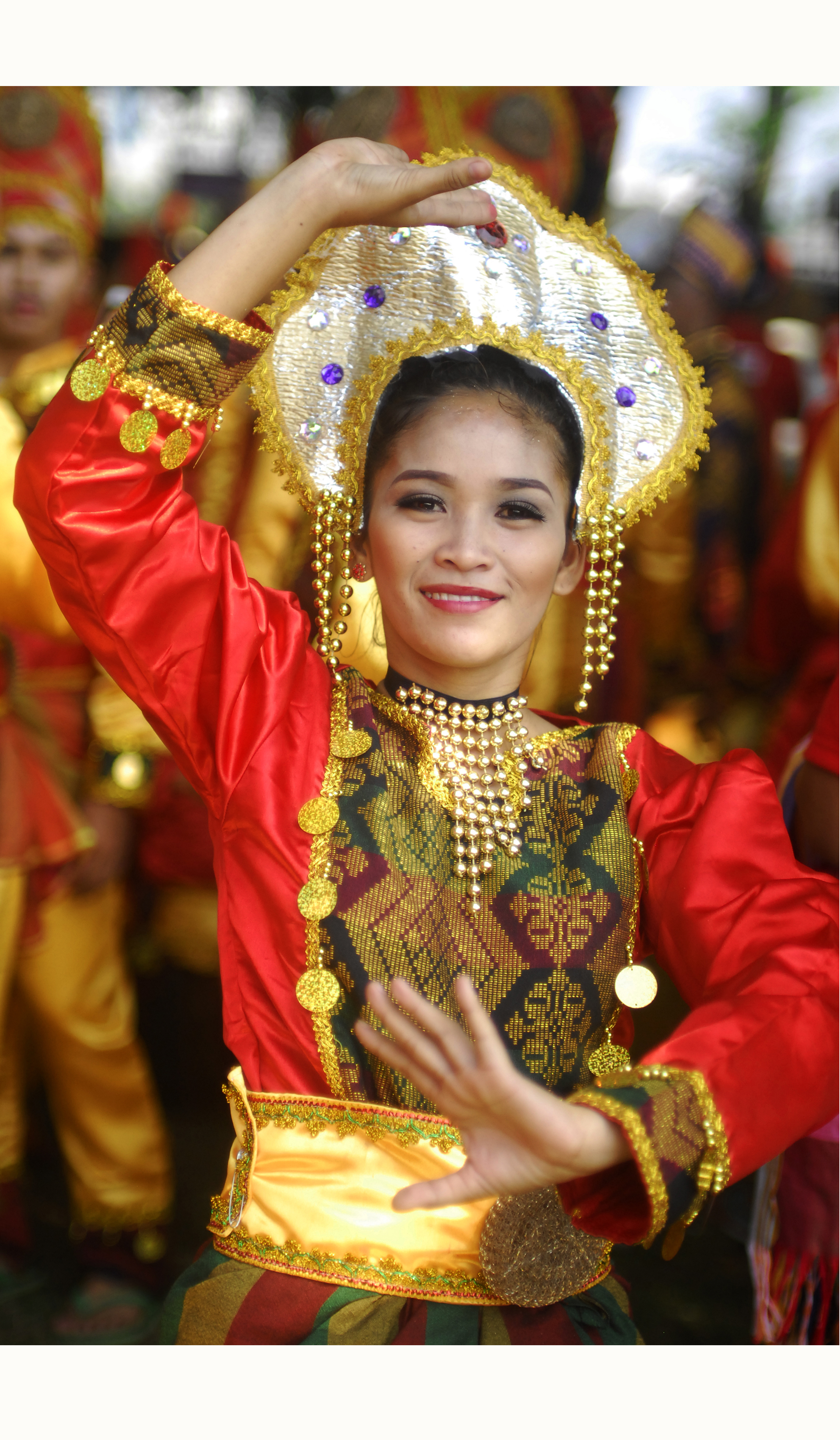
A native of Datu Piang town in a traditional wear

Population census of Datu Piang
Year	Pop.	±% p.a.
1903	87	—
1918	30,389	+47.76%
1939	55,329	+2.89%
1948	42,858	−2.80%
1960	36,464	−1.34%
1970	44,391	+1.98%
1975	50,110	+2.46%
1980	40,870	−3.99%
1990	53,311	+2.69%
1995	55,104	+0.62%
2000	67,303	+4.38%
2007	49,971	−4.02%
2010	28,492	−18.49%
2015	25,600	−2.02%
2020	28,380	+2.19%
2024	31,063	+2.19%
Source: Philippine Statistics Authority

== Economy ==
Poverty Incidence of Datu Piang

Source: Philippine Statistics Authority

== See also ==
- List of renamed cities and municipalities in the Philippines
