= Maguindanao del Sur Provincial Board =

Legislative body of the province of Maguindanao del Sur, Philippines

Maguindanao del Sur Provincial Board Sangguniang Panlalawigan ng Maguindanao del Sur

Type
- Type: Unicameral
- Term limits: 3 terms (9 years)

Leadership
- Presiding Officer: Hisham S. Nando, UBJP since June 30, 2025

Structure
- Seats: 14 board members 1 ex officio presiding officer
- Political groups: Nacionalista (4) UBJP (3) PFP (3) Vacant (1) Nonpartisan (3)
- Length of term: 3 years
- Authority: Local Government Code of the Philippines

Elections
- Voting system: Multiple non-transferable vote (regular members); Indirect election (ex officio members); Acclamation (sectoral member)
- Last election: May 12, 2025
- Next election: May 15, 2028

Meeting place
- Buluan, Maguindanao del Sur

The Maguindanao del Sur Provincial Board is the Sangguniang Panlalawigan (provincial legislature) of the Philippine province of Maguindanao del Sur.

The members are elected via plurality-at-large voting: the province is divided into two districts, each having five seats. A voter votes up to five names, with the top five candidates per district being elected. The vice governor is the ex officio presiding officer, and only votes to break ties. The vice governor is elected via the plurality voting system province-wide.

The districts used in appropriation of members is not coextensive with the legislative district of Maguindanao del Sur; unlike congressional representation which is at-large, Maguindanao del Sur is divided into two districts for representation in the Sangguniang Panlalawigan.

Aside from the regular members, the board also includes the provincial federation presidents of the Liga ng mga Barangay (ABC, from its old name "Association of Barangay Captains"), the Sangguniang Kabataan (SK, youth councils), the Philippine Councilors League (PCL), and the indigenous people representation.

The board was formed when the Maguindanao divided itself into two provinces on September 18, 2022 after a successful plebiscite on previous day.

== Apportionment ==
Elections	Seats per district		Ex officio seats	Reserved seats	Total seats
Elections	1st	2nd	Ex officio seats	Reserved seats	Total seats
2025–present	5	5	3	1	14

== List of members ==
=== Current members ===
These are the members after the 2025 local elections and 2023 barangay and SK elections:

- Vice Governor: Hisham S. Nando (UBJP)

Seat	Board member	Party	Start of term	End of term
1st district	Zahara U. Ampatuan	Nacionalista	June 30, 2025	June 30, 2028
1st district	Datu Puti M. Ampatuan	PFP	June 30, 2025	June 30, 2028
1st district	Norodin M. Ampatuan	PFP	June 30, 2025	June 30, 2028
1st district	Kahal Q. Kedtag	UBJP	June 30, 2025	June 30, 2028
1st district	Datusapak B. Midtimbang	PFP	June 30, 2025	June 30, 2028
2nd district	Alonto M. Bangkulit, Jr.	Nacionalista	June 30, 2025	June 30, 2028
2nd district	Saidali Makakena	Nacionalista	June 30, 2025	June 30, 2028
2nd district	Faujiah B. Mangelen	UBJP	June 30, 2025	June 30, 2028
2nd district	Rahib M. Nando	UBJP	June 30, 2025	June 30, 2028
2nd district	Yussed Abubakar M. Paglas	Nacionalista	June 30, 2025	June 30, 2028
ABC				
PCL				
SK				
IPMR				

=== Vice Governor ===
Election year	Name	Party	Ref.
2025	Hisham S. Nando	UBJP	

=== 1st District ===
- Municipalities: Ampatuan, Datu Abdullah Sangki, Datu Anggal Midtimbang, Datu Hoffer Ampatuan, Datu Piang, Datu Salibo, Datu Saudi Ampatuan, Datu Unsay, Guindulungan, Mamasapano, Shariff Aguak, Shariff Saydona Mustapha, South Upi, Talayan
- Population (2024):

Election year	Member (party)	Member (party)	Member (party)	Member (party)	Member (party)
2025	Zahara U. Ampatuan (Nacionalista)	Datu Puti M. Ampatuan (PFP)	Norodin M. Ampatuan (PFP)	Kahal Q. Kedtag (UBJP)	Datusapak B. Midtimbang (PFP)

=== 2nd District ===
- Municipalities: Buluan, Datu Montawal, Datu Paglas, General Salipada K. Pendatun, Mangudadatu, Pagalungan, Paglat, Pandag, Rajah Buayan, Sultan sa Barongis
- Population (2024):

Election year	Member (party)	Member (party)	Member (party)	Member (party)	Member (party)
2025	Alonto M. Bangkulit, Jr. (Nacionalista)	Saidali Makakena (Nacionalista)	Faujiah B. Mangelen (UBJP)	Rahib M. Nando (UBJP)	Yussed Abubakar M. Paglas (Nacionalista)
