= Legislative districts of Maguindanao del Sur =

Legislative district

The lone Legislative District of Maguindanao del Sur is the representation of the province of Maguindanao del Sur in the Philippine House of Representatives. Maguindanao del Sur was part of the representation of Maguindanao prior to its division in 2022. It will be granted its representation in the 19th Congress.

== History ==
Before gaining separate representation, areas now under the jurisdiction of Maguindanao del Sur were represented under the Department of Mindanao and Sulu (1917–1935), Cotabato (1935–1972), and Maguindanao (1984–2007, 2010–2022).

The enactment of Presidential Decree No. 341 on November 22, 1973, created the province of Maguindanao out of Cotabato's Maguindanao-majority municipalities. The new province was represented in the Interim Batasang Pambansa as part of Region XII from 1978 to 1984.

Maguindanao del Sur first gained separate representation in 1984, when it returned two representatives, elected at large, to the Regular Batasang Pambansa.

Under the new Constitution which was proclaimed on February 11, 1987, Maguindanao del Sur, was retained into one congressional district; each elected its member to the restored House of Representatives starting that same year.

The enactment of Republic Act No. 11550 on May 28, 2021, separated the former province of Maguindanao into the provinces of Maguindanao del Norte and Maguindanao del Sur and its subsequent ratification by plebiscite on September 17, 2022, separated from Maguindanao's second district 25 municipalities to create the province of Maguindanao del Sur. Per Section 9 of R.A. 11550, these new provinces were to comprise a single congressional district; voters began to elect the new province's separate representative beginning in 2025.

== Lone District ==
- Municipalities: Ampatuan, Buluan, Datu Paglas, Datu Piang, Pagalungan, Shariff Aguak, South Upi, Sultan sa Barongis, Talayan, General Salidapa K. Pendatun (established 1991), Mamasapano (established 1998), Talitay (established 1999), Datu Montawal (established 2000), Paglat (established 2001), Guindulungan (established 2003), Datu Saudi Ampatuan (established 2003), Datu Unsay (established 2003), Datu Abdullah Sangki (established 2004), Rajah Buayan (established 2004), Pandag (established 2006), Mangudadatu (established 2006), Datu Anggal Midtimbang (established 2006), Datu Hoffer Ampatuan (established 2009), Datu Salibo (established 2009), Shariff Saydona Mustapha (established 2009)
- Population (2020): 741,221
- Electorate (2022): 454,622

| Period | Representative |
|---|---|
| 19th Congress; 2022–2025 | Mohamad P. Paglas |

== See also ==
- Legislative districts of Mindanao and Sulu
- Legislative districts of Cotabato
- Legislative districts of Maguindanao
