= Maguindanao del Sur Provincial Capitol =

- Interactive map of the Maguindanao del Sur Provincial Capitol area
- Former names: Maguindanao Provincial Capitol (2019–2022)
- Alternative names: White House

General information
- Location: Buluan, Maguindanao del Sur, Philippines
- Coordinates: 6°42′50.6″N 124°47′02.7″E
- Groundbreaking: 2016
- Inaugurated: February 2019
- Cost: ₱500 million

Technical details
- Floor count: 2

The Maguindanao del Sur Provincial Capitol is a government building Buluan, Maguindanao del Sur.

It served as the seat of government of the undivided Maguindanao province from 2018. It became the seat of Maguindanao del Sur in 2022.

== History ==
=== Shariff Aguak capitols ===
The first capitol of Maguindanao province was Shariff Aguak. However the capitol of the province was moved to Sultan Kudarat town after the People Power Revolution. Under Governor Andal Ampatuan Sr., the province was governed from Shariff Aguak once again. He last held office from the Shariff Aguak Maguindanao capitol which was occupied around 2007 was abandoned after the Maguindanao massacre of 2009.

=== Current structure ===
==== Move of Maguindanao capital to Buluan ====
Under Esmael Mangudadatu who was elected as governor in 2010, the capitol was abandoned taking office in his hometown of Buluan instead.

=== Construction and inauguration ===
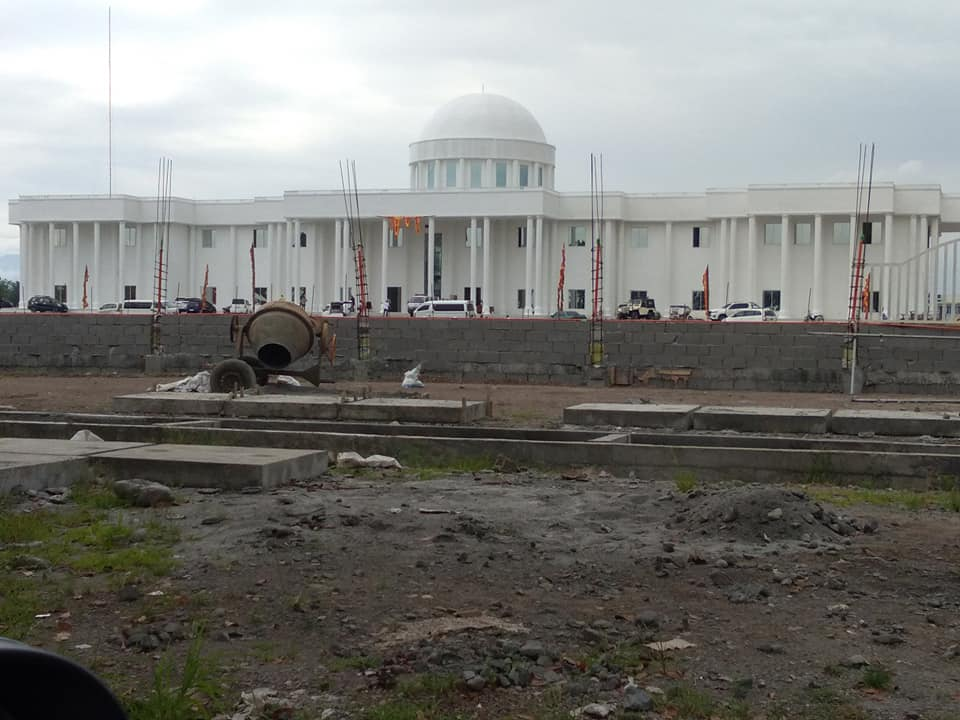
The Maguindanao Provincial Capitol in Buluan under construction as of 2018.

Construction of a new capitol building in Buluan began in 2016. It was built at the cost of ₱500 million and was inaugurated by President Rodrigo Duterte in February 2019.

Governor Mariam Mangudadatu moved to the old capitol in Shariff Aguak in 2019 wnere she briefly held office. She proposed to convert the Buluan building into a hospitall.

Maguindanao was dissolved in 2022 after a plebiscite and it was split into two provinces; Maguindanao del Sur and Maguindanao del Norte. Maguindanao del Sur has Buluan designated as its seat of government. The Maguindanao capitol in Buluan became the capitol of newly formed Maguindanao del Sur.

== Architecture and design ==
The provincial capitol in 2023

The Maguindanao del Sur capitol was designed by local architects. The capitol is nicknamed the "White House", since its propenents designed the building to resemble the American building of the same name although it is arguably resembles the United States Capitol for having a dome structure. It is reportedly a result of Maguindanao Esmael Mangudadatu's request to architect Evan Torollo to design the capitol after the US White House to honor his childhood dream to visit the US landmark.

The main capitol building has two floors and has a total floor area of 6,000 square meters (65,000 sq ft). The whole capitol complex is 5 hectares (12 acres).
