= Maguindanao del Sur's 2nd parliamentary district =

Parliamentary district for the Bangsamoro Parliament

- Constituency for the Bangsamoro Parliament
- Boundary of Maguindanao del Sur's 2nd parliamentary district in Maguindanao del Sur
- Province: Maguindanao del Sur
- Population: 132,625 (2024)
- Electorate: 78,920 (2026)

Current constituency
- Member of Parliament: Sajid Andre Ampatuan (elect)
- Political party: BFP

Maguindanao del Sur's 2nd parliamentary district is the second of the five parliamentary districts of the province of Maguindanao del Sur for the Bangsamoro Parliament. It is composed of the municipalities of Datu Piang, Datu Salibo, Datu Saudi Ampatuan, Datu Unsay, and Shariff Saydona Mustapha.

Sajid Andre Ampatuan of the Bangsamoro Federalist Party is the member of Parliament-elect for the district following the inaugural 2026 Bangsamoro Parliament election. He will assume office on October 30, 2026.

== List of MPs representing the district ==
No.	Portrait	Member (Lifespan)	Term of office	Party	Parliament	Electoral history	Constituencies
1		Sajid Andre Ampatuan (born 1999)	Assuming office on October 30, 2026	BFP	1st Parliament	Elected in 2026.	2026–present Datu Piang, Datu Salibo, Datu Saudi Ampatuan, Datu Unsay, Shariff Saydona Mustapha

== Election results ==
=== 2026 ===
2026 Bangsamoro Parliament election in Maguindanao del Sur
Party	Candidate	Votes	%
BFP	Sajid Andre Ampatuan	41,253	63.26
UBJP	Bobby Midtimbang	23,958	36.74
Total votes		65,211	100.00
BFP win (new seat)			
