= Akmad Ampatuan =

Philippine politician

Akmad Ampatuan is a Filipino mayor for Municipality of Shariff Aguak in the province of Maguindanao del Sur, Philippines.

== Biography ==
Akmad Ampatuan is part of the Ampatuan political family in Maguindanao.

He was a vice-mayor for the town of Shariff Aguak before his successful election as a mayor for the same town in 2022.

Ampatuan had been a frequent target for assassinations. In 2010, he survived a bombing. In 2014, while serving his vice-mayoral duties in Gindulungan, his convoy was ambushed, and so was in 2019 in Shariff Aguak. In both instances, he escaped with minor injuries while 4 of his escorts were killed in total.

In the morning of January 25, 2026, while returning home from a local market, his bullet-proof SUV was attacked with a rocket-propelled grenade (RPG) and high-powered rifles. The usage of RPG was captured on closed-circuit television cameras. Combined police, military, and community watch forces launched a hot pursuit operation on the attackers, who fled in a gray or white minivan. It resulted in the death of the four attackers and two of his escorts injured. Following the attack, Ampatuan requested for more escorts, stating that his security from the Department of Justice (DOJ) and his police escorts were withdrawn on December 3, 2025. The police formed a task force to investigate into the incident. Subsequently, after investigations, 15 individuals were charged in May 2026 under the Anti-Terrorism Act over the incident.
