= Maguindanao Provincial Capitol (Shariff Aguak) =

- Interactive map of the Maguindanao Provincial Capitol area

General information
- Location: Shariff Aguak, Maguindanao del Sur, Philippines
- Coordinates: 6°52′10.1″N 124°26′09.3″E
- Completed: 2007
- Inaugurated: March 2009
- Cost: ₱218 million

Technical details
- Floor count: 3

The Maguindanao Provincial Capitol is a government building in Shariff Aguak, Maguindanao del Sur.

It served as the seat of government of the undivided Maguindanao province from 2007 to 2009.

== History ==
=== First capitol ===
The first capitol of Maguindanao province was Shariff Aguak. However the capitol of the province was moved to Sultan Kudarat town after the People Power Revolution.

=== Second capitol ===
There were two more capitols built in the town. The second one was built by Andal Ampatuan Sr. who was elected as Maguindanao governor in 2001. He moved the government offices back to Shariff Aguak once again and built a columned capitol beside the municipal hall.

=== Current structure ===
Ampatuan Sr. built a new larger capitol in Shariff Aguak which was completed and occupied prior to the 2007 election but was only inaugurated in March 2009 in a ceremeony attended by President Gloria Macapagal Arroyo. It costed ₱218 million, ₱50 million of which came from the social funds of Arroyo.

After the Maguindanao massacre of 2009, the capitol was repurposed as a warehouse.

Under Esmael Mangudadatu who was elected as governor in 2010, the capitol was abandoned taking office in his hometown of Buluan instead.

In 2019, his successor Mariam Mangudadatu moved to the capitol once again.

The capitol building was temporarily converted as a COVID-19 isolation facility in July 2020 as a response to the COVID-19 pandemic.

Maguindanao was dissolved in 2022 and split into two provinces; Maguindanao del Sur and Maguindanao del Norte. Maguindanao del Sur has Buluan designated as its seat of government.

== Facilities ==
The Maguindanao Provincial Capitol has three storeys. It is also noted to have a Jacuzzi whirpool pool at the governor's wing.

The capitol stands 400 meters (1,300 ft) from the mansions of members of the Ampatuan clan.
