= Mamasapano =

Municipality in Maguindanao del Sur, Philippines

- Municipality
- Municipality of Mamasapano
- Municipal Hall

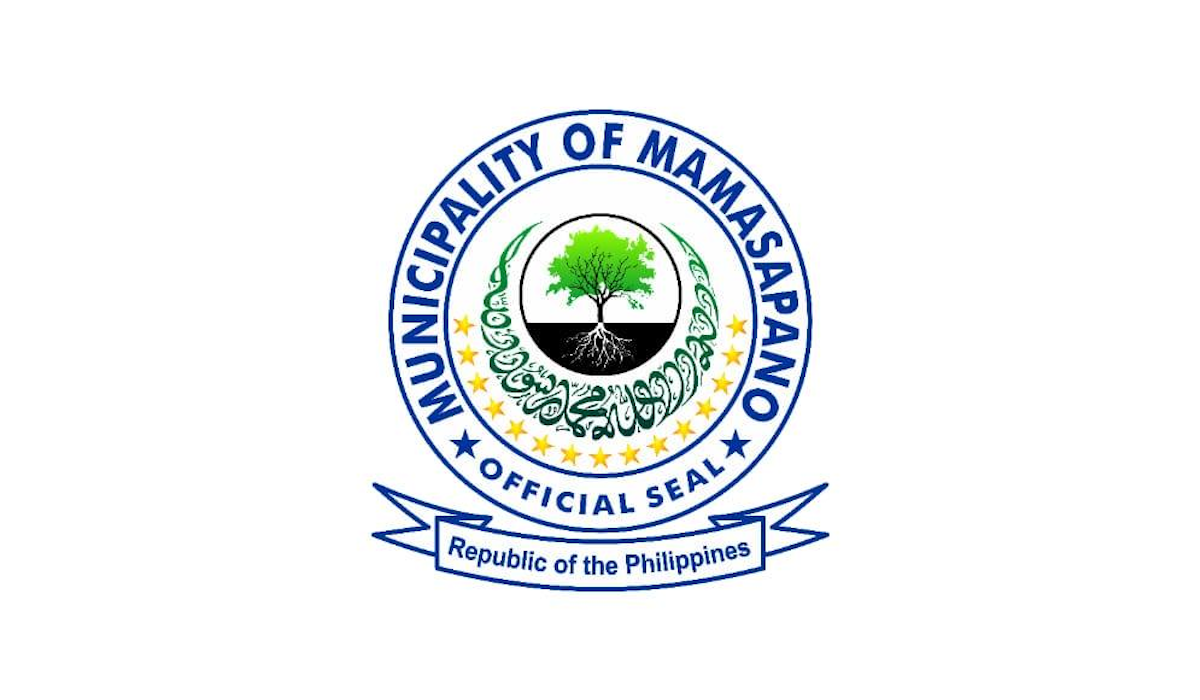
- Flag Seal

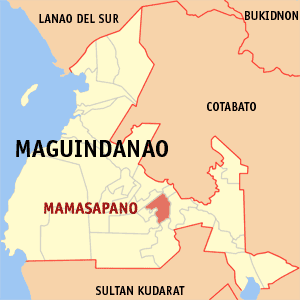
- Map of Maguindanao del Sur with Mamasapano highlighted
- Interactive map of Mamasapano
- Location within the Philippines
- Coordinates: 6°53′36″N 124°30′02″E
- Country: Philippines
- Region: Bangsamoro Autonomous Region in Muslim Mindanao
- Province: Maguindanao del Sur
- House district: Lone district
- Parliamentary district: 3rd district
- Founded: October 31, 1998
- Barangays: 14 (see Barangays)

Government
  - Type: Sangguniang Bayan
  - Mayor: Akmad A. Ampatuan Jr.
  - Vice Mayor: Tahirodin Benzar A. Ampatuan
  - House Representative: Mohamad P. Paglas Sr.
  - Municipal Council: Members: Sharmaine Reham A. Ampatuan; Mahir M. Ampatuan; Mohamad Nor A. Ampatuan; Tohamie T. Masukat; Datukedsi A. Mamasapano; Mama A. Masukat Jr.; Jacky H. Abdillah; Abdila M. Maulana
  - Electorate: 16,248 voters (2025)

Area
  - Total: 85.31 km^{2} (32.94 sq mi)
- Elevation: 13 m (43 ft)
- Highest elevation: 54 m (177 ft)
- Lowest elevation: 5 m (16 ft)

Population (2024 census)
  - Total: 32,831
  - Density: 384.8/km^{2} (996.7/sq mi)
  - Households: 4,401

Economy
  - Income class: 4th municipal income class
  - Poverty incidence: 41.91% (2023)
  - Revenue: ₱ 129.6 million (2024)
  - Assets: ₱ 126.1 million (2024)
  - Expenditure: ₱ 138.2 million (2024)
  - Liabilities: ₱ 24.03 million (2024)

Service provider
  - Electricity: Maguindanao Electric Cooperative (MAGELCO)
- Time zone: UTC+8 (PST)
- ZIP code: 9608
- PSGC: 1903820000
- IDD : area code: +63 (0)64
- Native languages: Maguindanao; Tagalog
- Website: www.mamasapano.gov.ph

Mamasapano, officially the Municipality of Mamasapano (Maguindanaon: Ingud nu Mamasapano; Iranun: Inged a Mamasapano; Tagalog: Bayan ng Mamasapano), is a municipality in the province of Maguindanao del Sur, Philippines. According to the 2024 census, it had a population of 32,831.

== History ==
This municipality was formerly a barangay of the town of Shariff Aguak. However, by virtue of Republic Acts No. 6646/7160 and Muslim Mindanao Autonomy Act No. 54 dated April 27, 1997, issued on December 2, 1998, COMELEC Resolution No. 3051/3052 and Plebiscite conducted on October 31, 1998, the Municipality of Mamasapano then became the 11th municipality in the 2nd District of Maguindanao. The newly created municipality has eighteen (18) barangays taken from its mother municipality of Shariff Aguak.

On July 30, 2009, upon the ratification of Muslim Mindanao Autonomy Act No. 225 (as amended by MMAA 252), the municipality of Shariff Saydona Mustapha was created from 4 barangays and a portion of one barangay (Libutan East) from Mamasapano, in addition to other barangays from Datu Piang, Datu Unsay, Datu Saudi Ampatuan and Shariff Aguak.

=== Mamasapano clash ===
On Sunday, January 25, 2015, the area around Mamasapano was the site of a sharp clash between Philippines government armed forces and local rebel groups. During the fighting, 44 members of the Philippine National Police elite Special Action Force (SAF) were killed. The Moro Islamic Liberation Front (MILF) stated that 18 people had died on the rebel side. Some local civilians were also reportedly killed during the incident. The unexpected clash, and the deaths of 44 SAF police as well as the wounding of 12 others, triggered bitter recriminations among leaders at the national level and threatened to derail on-going reconciliation negotiations between the Philippines Government and various rebel groups in Mindanao. It was reported that members of both the MILF as well as the Bangsamoro Islamic Freedom Fighters (BIFF) were involved in the action on the rebel side.

In response to the clash and deaths of national police, President Aquino called for the peace talks with MILF to nevertheless continue but also demanded that MILF forces assist in identifying the persons responsible for killing the police and, in other ways, demonstrate sincerity in supporting the peace efforts.

Subsequently, it was reported that both the Philippines government and local MILF representatives were working to try to restore life to normal in the Mamasapano area. Representatives of the Philippines government visited the area in early February to deliver assistance to families who had lost relatives during the fighting. Representatives of the MILF also issued assurances that on-going efforts to establish peace in the region would not be disrupted by the clash.

Nevertheless, in the following weeks local fighting continued between government forces and the BIFF rebel group. In early March government forces were reported to have captured a BIFF camp where bombs and weapons were being manufactured.

== Geography ==
=== Barangays ===
Mamasapano is politically subdivided into 15 barangays. Each barangay consists of puroks while some have sitios.

- Bagumbong
- Dabenayan
- Daladap
- Dasikil
- Liab
- Libutan
- Lusay
- Mamasapano
- Manongkaling
- Matias
- Pidsandawan
- Pimbalakan
- Sapakan
- Tuka
- Tukanalipao

=== Climate ===
Climate data for Mamasapano, Maguindanao del Sur
Month	Jan	Feb	Mar	Apr	May	Jun	Jul	Aug	Sep	Oct	Nov	Dec	Year
Mean daily maximum °C (°F)	32 (90)	32 (90)	33 (91)	33 (91)	32 (90)	31 (88)	30 (86)	31 (88)	31 (88)	31 (88)	31 (88)	31 (88)	32 (89)
Mean daily minimum °C (°F)	21 (70)	21 (70)	21 (70)	22 (72)	23 (73)	23 (73)	23 (73)	23 (73)	23 (73)	23 (73)	23 (73)	22 (72)	22 (72)
Average precipitation mm (inches)	19 (0.7)	14 (0.6)	15 (0.6)	18 (0.7)	33 (1.3)	42 (1.7)	44 (1.7)	42 (1.7)	30 (1.2)	31 (1.2)	28 (1.1)	17 (0.7)	333 (13.2)
Average rainy days	6.9	5.6	6.9	8.1	15.1	17.5	17.8	18.5	14.9	14.9	12.4	8.0	146.6
Source: Meteoblue (modeled/calculated data, not measured locally)

== Demographics ==
Population census of Mamasapano
Year	Pop.	±% p.a.
1995	16,121	—
2000	20,059	+4.80%
2007	29,285	+5.36%
2010	22,354	−9.36%
2015	24,800	+2.00%
2020	27,807	+2.44%
2024	32,831	+4.07%
Source: Philippine Statistics Authority

== Economy ==
Poverty Incidence of Mamasapano

Source: Philippine Statistics Authority
