= Datu Saudi Ampatuan =

Municipality in Maguindanao del Sur, Philippines

- Municipality
- Municipality of Datu Saudi Ampatuan
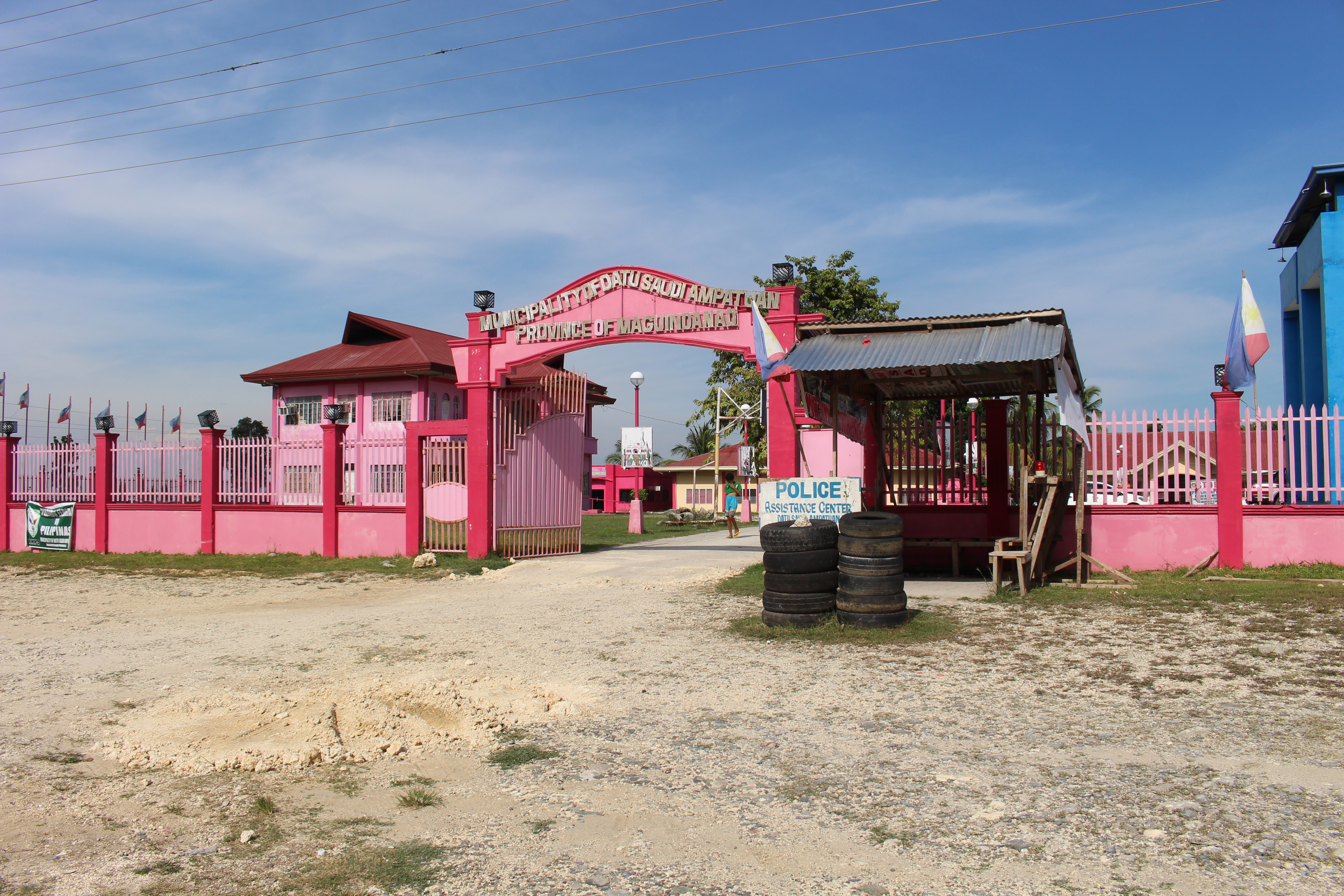
- Municipal Complex of Datu Saudi Ampatuan

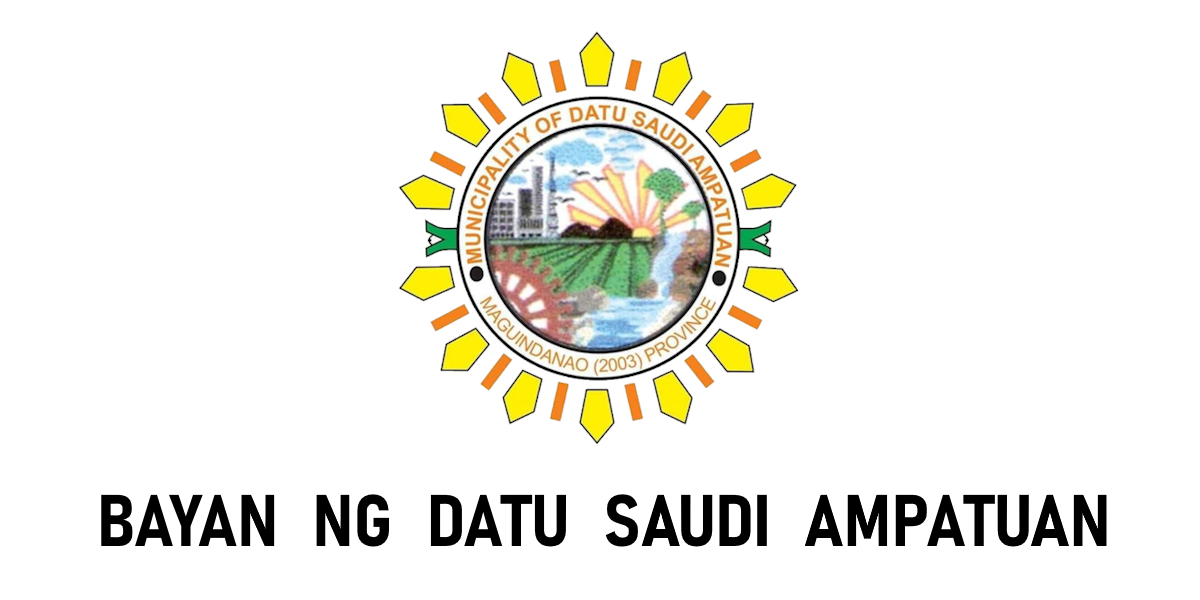
- Flag Seal

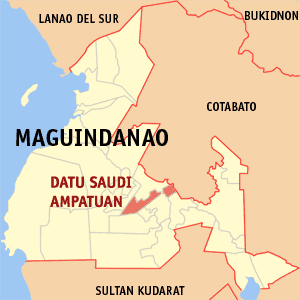
- Map of Maguindanao del Sur with Datu Saudi Ampatuan highlighted
- Interactive map of Datu Saudi Ampatuan
- Location within the Philippines
- Coordinates: 6°55′35″N 124°24′54″E
- Country: Philippines
- Region: Bangsamoro Autonomous Region in Muslim Mindanao
- Province: Maguindanao del Sur
- House district: Lone district
- Parliamentary district: 2nd district
- Founded: July 1, 2003
- Named for: Saudi Uy Ampatuan
- Barangays: 8 (see Barangays)

Government
  - Type: Sangguniang Bayan
  - Mayor: Edris A. Sindatok
  - Vice Mayor: Bassir D. Utto
  - House Representative: Mohamad P. Paglas Sr.
  - Municipal Council: Members: Datumero D. Utto; Bailon S. Dimaukom; Nasrullah A. Dimaukom; Zamzama D. Sindatok; Justine E. Kanakan; Aboubaida M. Guiaman; Sahid K. Mamalapat; Yasser T. Tambungalan
  - Electorate: 20,573 voters (2025)

Area
  - Total: 60.16 km^{2} (23.23 sq mi)
- Elevation: 87 m (285 ft)
- Highest elevation: 571 m (1,873 ft)
- Lowest elevation: 4 m (13 ft)

Population (2024 census)
  - Total: 33,374
  - Density: 554.8/km^{2} (1,437/sq mi)
  - Households: 4,970

Economy
  - Income class: 4th municipal income class
  - Poverty incidence: 64.26% (2023)
  - Revenue: ₱ 130.2 million (2024)
  - Assets: ₱ 22.76 million (2024)
  - Expenditure: ₱ 122.1 million (2024)
  - Liabilities: ₱ 32.44 million (2024)

Service provider
  - Electricity: Maguindanao Electric Cooperative (MAGELCO)
- Time zone: UTC+8 (PST)
- ZIP code: 9607
- PSGC: 1903826000
- IDD : area code: +63 (0)64
- Native languages: Maguindanao; Tagalog
- Website: www.datusaudiampatuan.gov.ph

Datu Saudi Ampatuan, officially the Municipality of Datu Saudi Ampatuan (Maguindanaon: Ingud nu Datu Saudi Ampatuan; Iranun: Inged a Datu Saudi Ampatuan; Tagalog: Bayan ng Datu Saudi Ampatuan), is a municipality in the province of Maguindanao del Sur, Philippines. According to the 2024 census, it had a population of 33,374.

== Etymology ==
The municipality was named in honor of the former mayor of Datu Piang, Datu Saudi Uy Ampatuan who died due to a bomb explosion on December 24, 2002, at Datu Piang Avenue of the said municipality.

== History ==
Pink Mosque

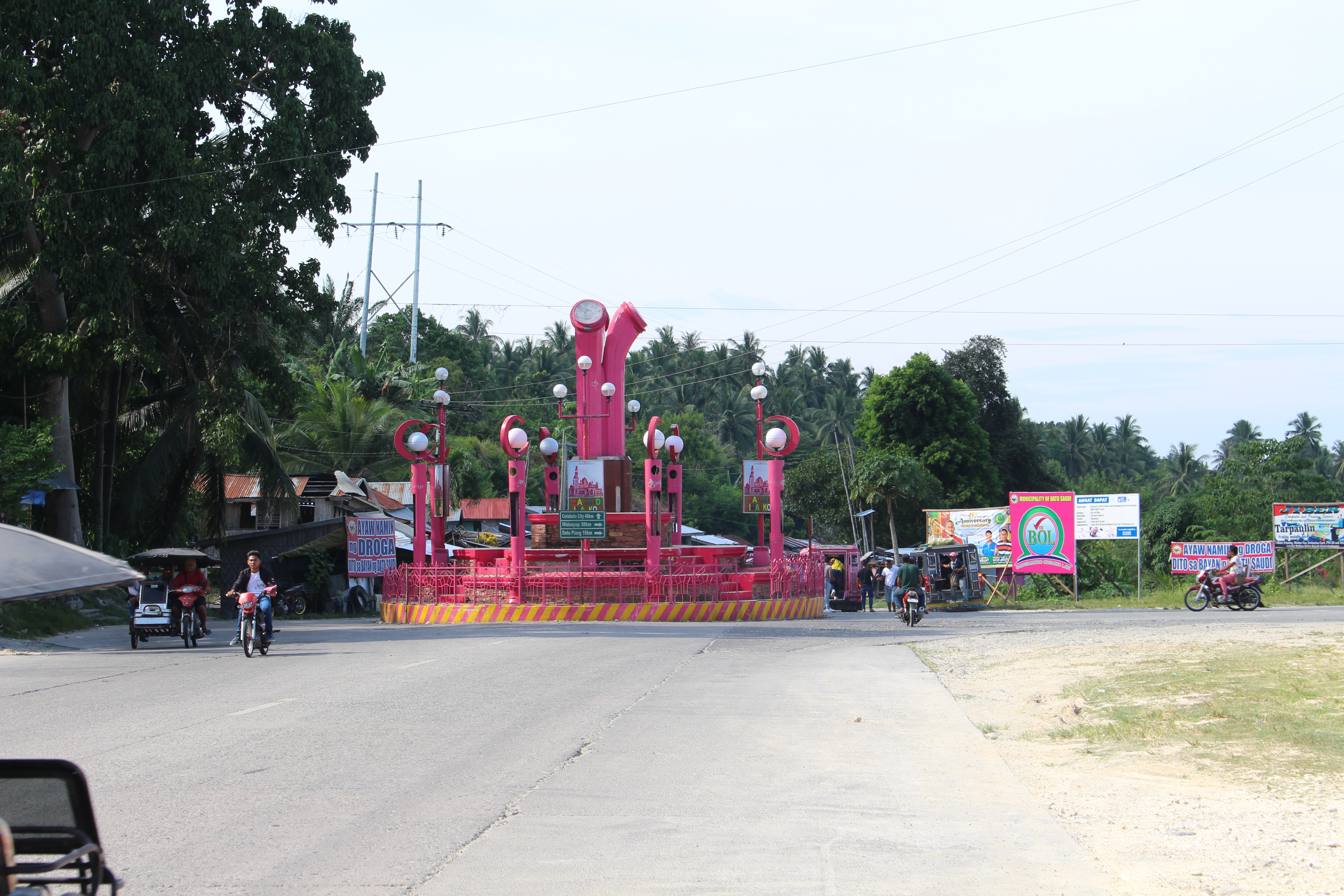
Roundabout in Datu Saudi Ampatuan

Datu Saudi Ampatuan was created under Muslim Mindanao Autonomy Act No. 151 on July 1, 2003, carved out of the municipality of Datu Piang.

On July 30, 2009, upon the ratification of Muslim Mindanao Autonomy Acts No. 225 (as amended by MMAA 252) and MMAA 222 (as amended by MMAA 253), the municipalities of Shariff Saydona Mustapha and Datu Salibo, respectively, were created from a total of 5 entire barangays and a portion of one barangay from Datu Saudi Ampatuan, in addition to other barangays from Datu Piang, Datu Unsay, Mamasapano, and Shariff Aguak.

Datu Saudi Ampatuan mayor Samsudin Dimaukom, publicly accused by Philippine President Rodrigo Duterte of involvement in the illegal drug trade, was killed on October 28, 2016, along with nine others, by Philippine police at a highway checkpoint in what police describe as an anti-drug operation.

== Geography ==
=== Barangays ===
Datu Saudi Ampatuan is politically subdivided into 8 barangays. Each barangay consists of puroks while some have sitios.

- Dapiawan
- Elian
- Gawang
- Kabengi
- Kitango
- Kitapok
- Madia
- Salbu

=== Climate ===
Climate data for Datu Saudi Ampatuan, Maguindanao del Sur
Month	Jan	Feb	Mar	Apr	May	Jun	Jul	Aug	Sep	Oct	Nov	Dec	Year
Mean daily maximum °C (°F)	31 (88)	32 (90)	32 (90)	32 (90)	31 (88)	29 (84)	29 (84)	29 (84)	30 (86)	30 (86)	30 (86)	31 (88)	31 (87)
Mean daily minimum °C (°F)	21 (70)	21 (70)	21 (70)	23 (73)	23 (73)	23 (73)	23 (73)	23 (73)	23 (73)	23 (73)	23 (73)	22 (72)	22 (72)
Average precipitation mm (inches)	30 (1.2)	19 (0.7)	25 (1.0)	24 (0.9)	64 (2.5)	88 (3.5)	102 (4.0)	105 (4.1)	76 (3.0)	82 (3.2)	60 (2.4)	26 (1.0)	701 (27.5)
Average rainy days	9.8	8.5	11.3	11.9	21.6	23.9	24.1	24.5	20.9	21.8	16.8	11.8	206.9
Source: Meteoblue (modeled/calculated data, not measured locally)

== Demographics ==
Population census of Datu Saudi Ampatuan
Year	Pop.	±% p.a.
2007	45,126	—
2010	20,330	−25.19%
2015	26,427	+5.12%
2020	31,060	+3.46%
2024	33,374	+1.74%
Source: Philippine Statistics Authority

== Economy ==
Poverty Incidence of Datu Saudi Ampatuan

Source: Philippine Statistics Authority

== Education ==
The Municipality has 1 Secondary School, the Dimaukom National High School formerly known as Datu Saudi Uy Ampatuan National High School with the school ID 318315. In school year 2015 - 2016 the number of students reached 444. It has 11 Regular Permanent Teachers and 6 Volunteer Teachers.
