= Datu Salibo =

Municipality in Maguindanao del Sur, Philippines

- Municipality
- Municipality of Datu Salibo
- Municipal Hall

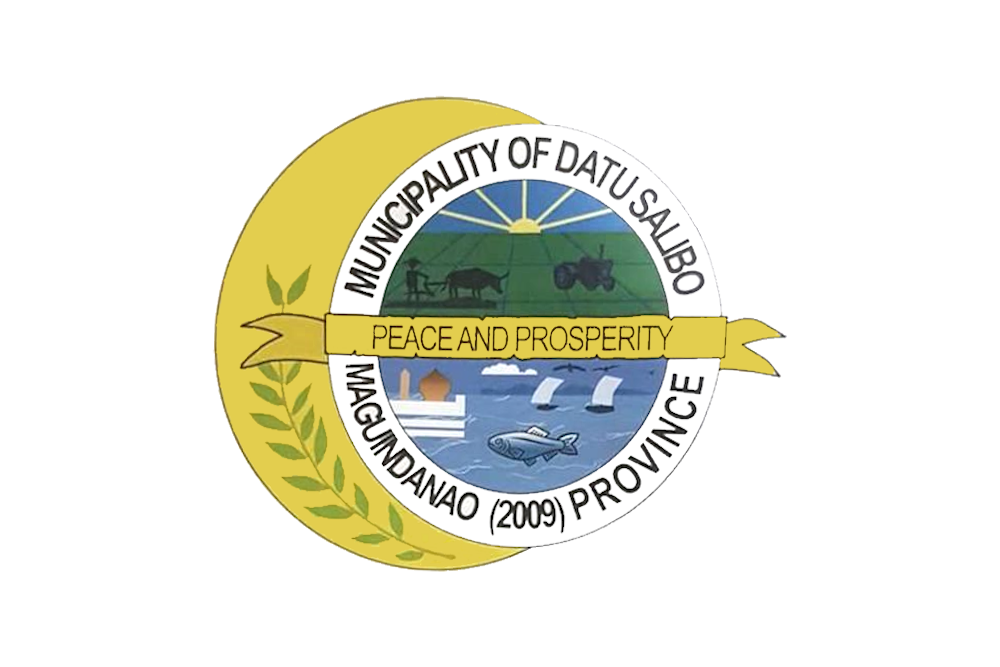
- Flag Seal
- Interactive map of Datu Salibo
- Location within the Philippines
- Coordinates: 7°01′N 124°30′E
- Country: Philippines
- Region: Bangsamoro Autonomous Region in Muslim Mindanao
- Province: Maguindanao del Sur
- House district: Lone district
- Parliamentary district: 2nd district
- Founded: July 30, 2009
- Barangays: 17 (see Barangays)

Government
  - Type: Sangguniang Bayan
  - Mayor: Khominie B. Sandigan
  - Vice Mayor: Omar K. Ali
  - House Representative: Esmael Mangudadatu
  - Municipal Council: Members: Hedarie L. Menak; Mustala S. Tulino; Saudi L. Kusain; Ansarie A. Menak; Busrha O. Sandigan; Abdillah D. Singh; Albasser K. Mamalapat; Allan T. Ganoy
  - Electorate: 14,900 voters (2025)

Area
  - Total: 150.62 km^{2} (58.15 sq mi)
- Elevation: 7.0 m (23.0 ft)
- Highest elevation: 46 m (151 ft)
- Lowest elevation: 0 m (0 ft)

Population (2024 census)
  - Total: 21,295
  - Density: 141.38/km^{2} (366.18/sq mi)
  - Households: 3,244

Economy
  - Income class: 4th municipal income class
  - Poverty incidence: 49.66% (2023)
  - Revenue: ₱ 104.1 million (2024)
  - Assets: ₱ 144.8 million (2024)
  - Expenditure: ₱ 96.22 million (2024)
  - Liabilities: ₱ 38.6 million (2024)

Service provider
  - Electricity: Maguindanao Electric Cooperative (MAGELCO)
- Time zone: UTC+8 (PST)
- ZIP code: 9607
- PSGC: 1903836000
- IDD : area code: +63 (0)64
- Native languages: Maguindanao; Tagalog

Datu Salibo, officially the Municipality of Datu Salibo (Maguindanaon: Ingud nu Datu Salibo; Iranun: Inged a Datu Salibo; Tagalog: Bayan ng Datu Salibo), is a municipality in the province of Maguindanao del Sur, Philippines. According to the 2024 census, it had a population of 21,295.

== History ==
Muslim Mindanao Act No. 222 was enacted by the ARMM Regional Legislative Assembly and subsequently amended by MMA No. 253, creating the municipality of Salibo out 17 barangays. The ARMM act was ratified through a plebiscite conducted by the COMELEC on July 30, 2009.

It included 4 entire barangays and portions of 10 barangays from Datu Piang (Dulawan), and 2 entire barangays and a portion of one barangay from the municipality of Datu Saudi Ampatuan.

== Geography ==
=== Barangays ===
Datu Salibo is composed of 17 barangays. Each barangay consists of puroks while some have sitios.

- Alonganan
- Andavit
- Balanakan
- Buayan
- Butilen
- Dado
- Damabalas
- Duaminanga
- Kalipapa
- Liong
- Magaslong
- Masigay
- Pagatin
- Pandi
- Penditen
- Sambulawan
- Tee

=== Climate ===
Climate data for Datu Salibo, Maguindanao del Sur
Month	Jan	Feb	Mar	Apr	May	Jun	Jul	Aug	Sep	Oct	Nov	Dec	Year
Mean daily maximum °C (°F)	32 (90)	32 (90)	33 (91)	33 (91)	32 (90)	31 (88)	30 (86)	31 (88)	31 (88)	31 (88)	31 (88)	31 (88)	32 (89)
Mean daily minimum °C (°F)	21 (70)	21 (70)	21 (70)	22 (72)	23 (73)	23 (73)	23 (73)	23 (73)	23 (73)	23 (73)	23 (73)	22 (72)	22 (72)
Average precipitation mm (inches)	19 (0.7)	14 (0.6)	15 (0.6)	18 (0.7)	33 (1.3)	42 (1.7)	44 (1.7)	42 (1.7)	30 (1.2)	31 (1.2)	28 (1.1)	17 (0.7)	333 (13.2)
Average rainy days	6.9	5.6	6.9	8.1	15.1	17.5	17.8	18.5	14.9	14.9	12.4	8.0	146.6
Source: Meteoblue (modeled/calculated data, not measured locally)

== Demographics ==
Population census of Datu Salibo
Year	Pop.	±% p.a.
2010	15,062	—
2015	14,947	−0.15%
2020	18,795	+4.94%
2024	21,295	+3.04%
Source: Philippine Statistics Authority

== Economy ==
Poverty Incidence of Datu Salibo

Source: Philippine Statistics Authority
