= Datu Unsay =

Municipality in Maguindanao del Sur, Philippines

- Municipality
- Municipality of Datu Unsay
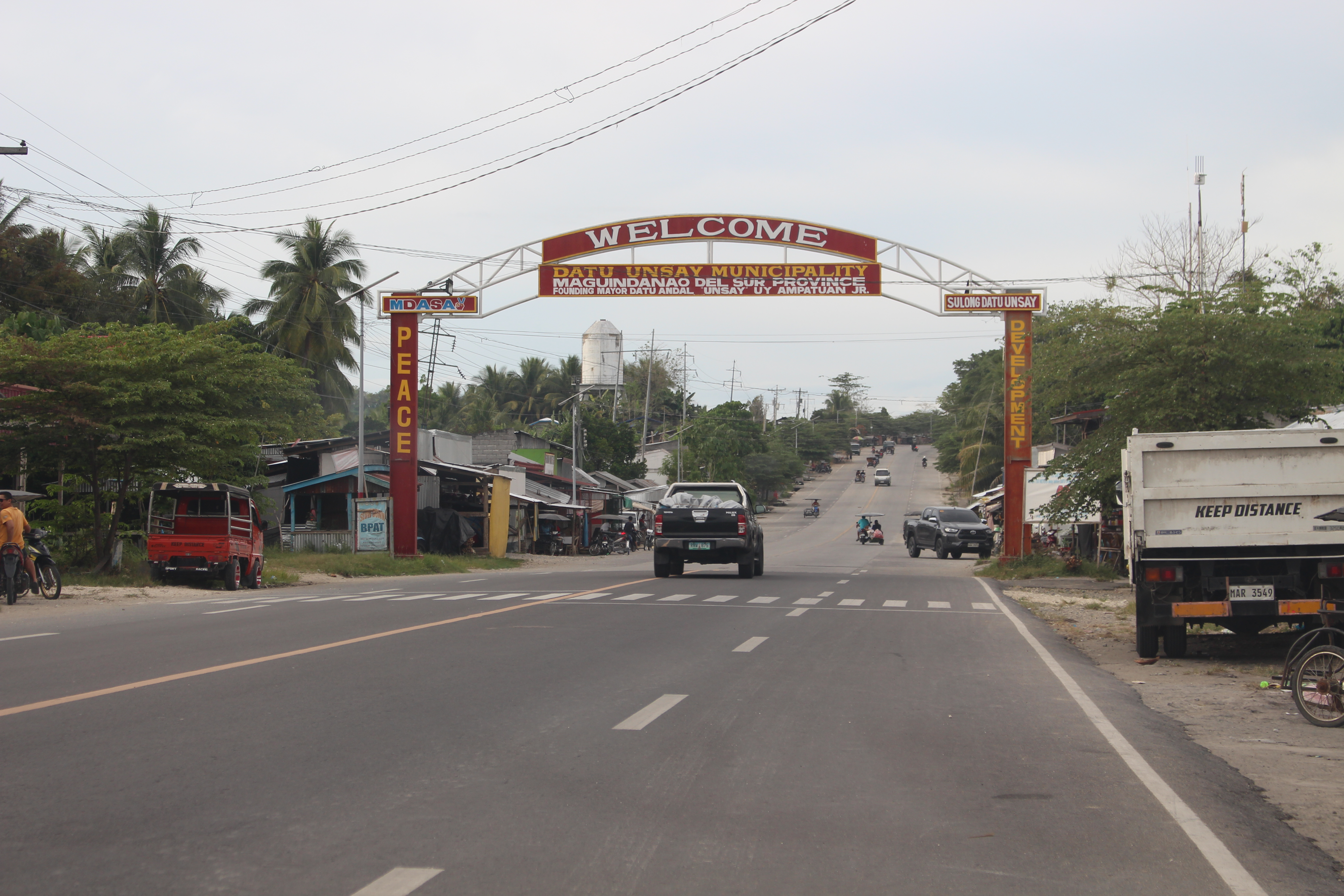
- Archway Sign

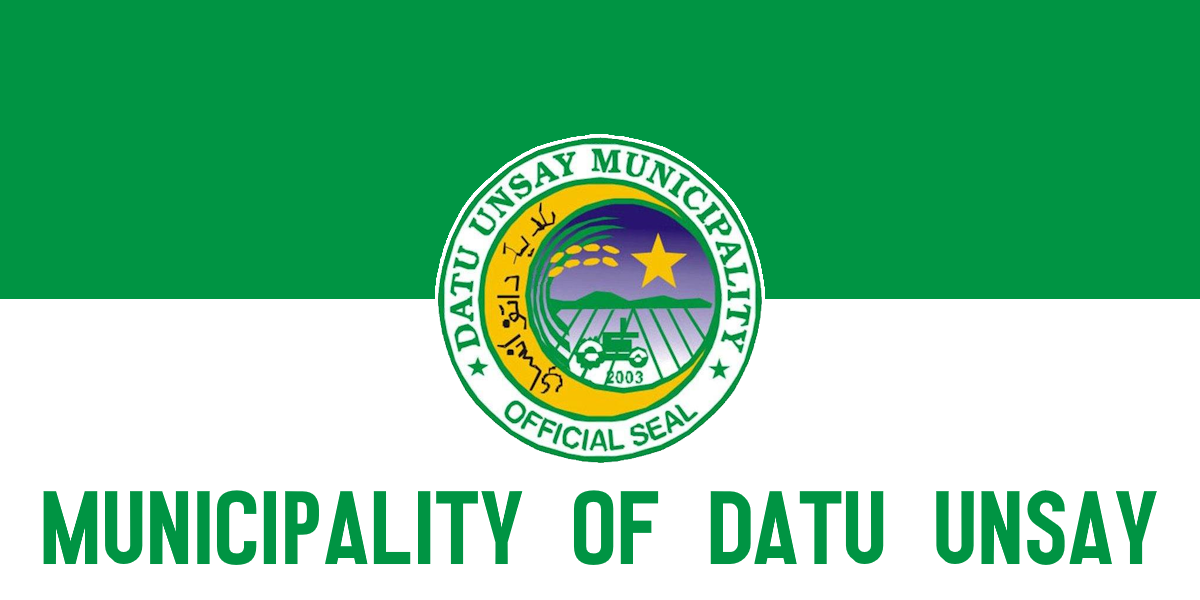
- Flag Seal

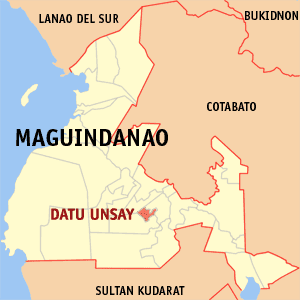
- Map of Maguindanao del Sur with Datu Unsay highlighted
- Interactive map of Datu Unsay
- Location within the Philippines
- Coordinates: 6°52′54″N 124°26′05″E
- Country: Philippines
- Region: Bangsamoro Autonomous Region in Muslim Mindanao
- Province: Maguindanao del Sur
- House district: Lone district
- Parliamentary district: 2nd district
- Founded: July 1, 2003
- Barangays: 8 (see Barangays)

Government
  - Type: Sangguniang Bayan
  - Mayor: Datu Andal S. Ampatuan V
  - Vice Mayor: Bai Alicia Nicole S. Ampatuan
  - House Representative: Mohamad P. Paglas Sr.
  - Municipal Council: Members: Bai Almirah Alyannah S. Ampatuan; Mohammad Shamron U. Sapalon; Mhark T. Dukay; Harbie M. Abdulrahim; Bansio K. Utto; Rahima O. Guiapal; Pendatun U. Guiambangan; Aira M. Kabalu
  - Electorate: 11,012 voters (2025)

Area
  - Total: 95.39 km^{2} (36.83 sq mi)
- Elevation: 82 m (269 ft)
- Highest elevation: 615 m (2,018 ft)
- Lowest elevation: 9 m (30 ft)

Population (2024 census)
  - Total: 12,890
  - Density: 135.1/km^{2} (350.0/sq mi)
  - Households: 2,251

Economy
  - Income class: 4th municipal income class
  - Poverty incidence: 48.93% (2023)
  - Revenue: ₱ 102.2 million (2024)
  - Assets: ₱ 372.2 million (2024)
  - Expenditure: ₱ 98.17 million (2024)
  - Liabilities: ₱ 61.74 million (2024)

Service provider
  - Electricity: Maguindanao Electric Cooperative (MAGELCO)
- Time zone: UTC+8 (PST)
- ZIP code: 9608
- PSGC: 1903827000
- IDD : area code: +63 (0)64
- Native languages: Maguindanao; Tagalog
- Website: www.datuunsayampatuan.gov.ph

Datu Unsay, officially the Municipality of Datu Unsay (Maguindanaon: Ingud nu Datu Unsay; Iranun: Inged a Datu Unsay; Tagalog: Bayan ng Datu Unsay), is a municipality in the province of Maguindanao del Sur, Philippines. According to the 2024 census, it has a population of 17,186 people, making it the least populated municipality in the province.

== History ==
Datu Unsay was created under Muslim Mindanao Autonomy Act No. 150 on July 1, 2003, carved out of the municipality of Shariff Aguak. The town is named after its former mayor Andal "Datu Unsay" Ampatuan, Jr.

On July 30, 2009, upon the ratification of Muslim Mindanao Autonomy Acts No. 225 (as amended by MMAA 252) and MMAA 220, the municipalities of Shariff Saydona Mustapha and Datu Hoffer Ampatuan, respectively, were created from a total of 2 entire barangays and portions of 2 barangays from Datu Unsay, in addition to other barangays from Datu Piang, Datu Saudi Ampatuan, Mamasapano, and Shariff Aguak.

== Geography ==
=== Barangays ===
Datu Unsay is politically subdivided into 8 barangays. Each barangay consists of puroks while some have sitios.

- Bulayan
- Iganagampong
- Macalag
- Maitumaig
- Malangog
- Meta
- Panangeti
- Tuntungan

=== Climate ===
Climate data for Datu Unsay, Maguindanao del Sur
Month	Jan	Feb	Mar	Apr	May	Jun	Jul	Aug	Sep	Oct	Nov	Dec	Year
Mean daily maximum °C (°F)	31 (88)	32 (90)	32 (90)	32 (90)	31 (88)	29 (84)	29 (84)	29 (84)	30 (86)	30 (86)	30 (86)	31 (88)	31 (87)
Mean daily minimum °C (°F)	21 (70)	21 (70)	21 (70)	23 (73)	23 (73)	23 (73)	23 (73)	23 (73)	23 (73)	23 (73)	23 (73)	22 (72)	22 (72)
Average precipitation mm (inches)	30 (1.2)	19 (0.7)	25 (1.0)	24 (0.9)	64 (2.5)	88 (3.5)	102 (4.0)	105 (4.1)	76 (3.0)	82 (3.2)	60 (2.4)	26 (1.0)	701 (27.5)
Average rainy days	9.8	8.5	11.3	11.9	21.6	23.9	24.1	24.5	20.9	21.8	16.8	11.8	206.9
Source: Meteoblue (modeled/calculated data, not measured locally)

== Demographics ==
Population census of Datu Unsay
Year	Pop.	±% p.a.
2007	40,522	—
2010	12,490	−34.84%
2015	11,813	−1.06%
2020	12,890	+1.85%
2024	17,186	+7.15%
Source: Philippine Statistics Authority

== Economy ==
Poverty Incidence of Datu Unsay

Source: Philippine Statistics Authority
