= Shariff Saydona Mustapha =

Municipality in Maguindanao del Sur, Philippines

Shariff Saydona Mustapha شريف سيدونا مصطفى
- Municipality
- Municipality of Shariff Saydona Mustapha
- Municipal Compound

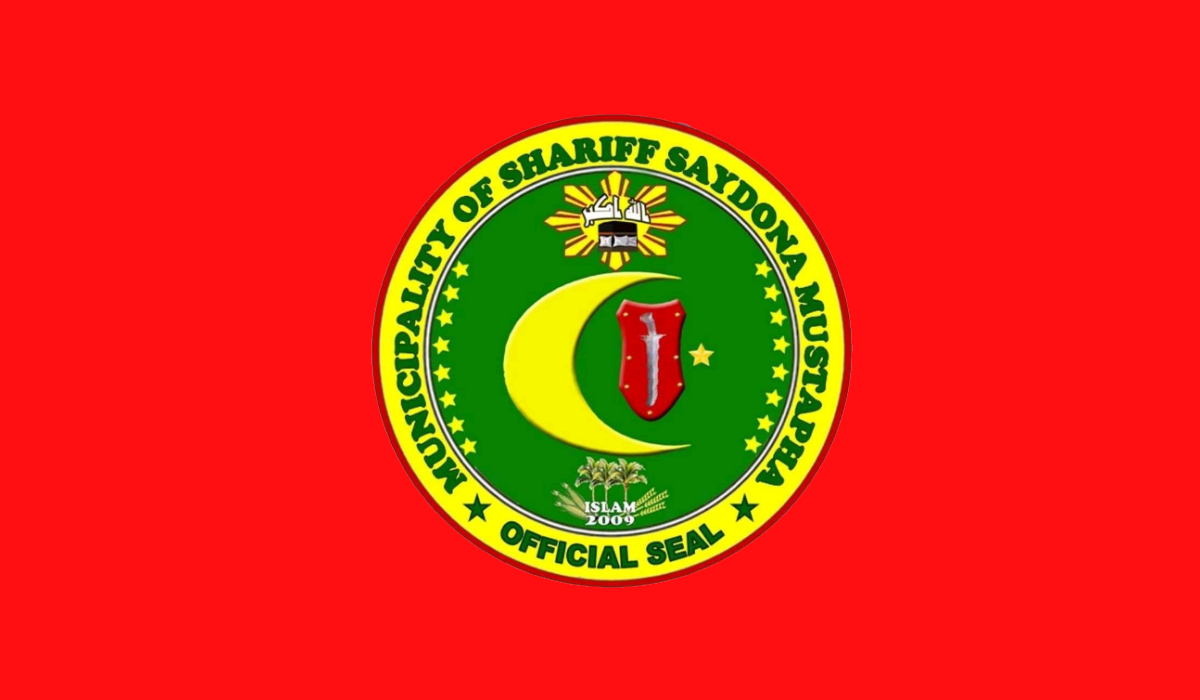
- Flag Seal

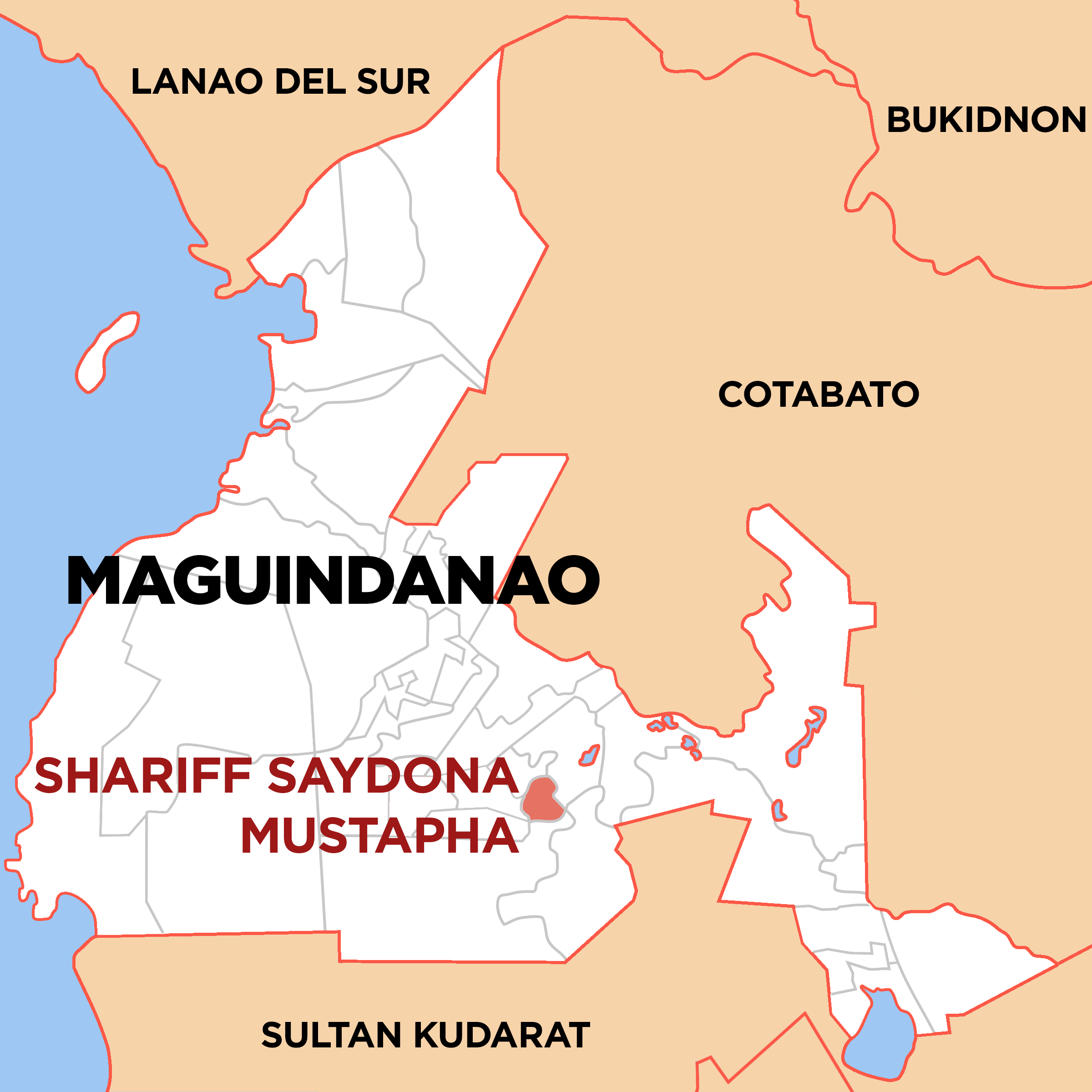
- Map of Maguindanao del Sur with Shariff Saydona Mustapha highlighted
- Interactive map of Shariff Saydona Mustapha
- Location within the Philippines
- Coordinates: 6°53′05″N 124°29′23″E
- Country: Philippines
- Region: Bangsamoro Autonomous Region in Muslim Mindanao
- Province: Maguindanao del Sur
- House district: Lone district
- Parliamentary district: 2nd district
- Founded: July 30, 2009
- Barangays: 16 (see Barangays)

Government
  - Type: Sangguniang Bayan
  - Mayor: Sajid Andre S. Ampatuan
  - Vice Mayor: Datu Andal Sajid S. Ampatuan VI
  - House Representative: Esmael "Toto" G. Mangudadatu
  - Municipal Council: Members: Bai Zandria S. Ampatuan; Datu Sajid Islam S. Ampatuan Jr.; Datu Alnur S. Ampatuan; Al-Jamier Jiego A. Mamalapat; Sonny Boy Kaki; Mutin T. Rajahpandalat; Zukra B. Dagandal; Samir M. Paraid
  - Electorate: 10,288 voters (2025)

Area
  - Total: 164.42 km^{2} (63.48 sq mi)
- Elevation: 8.0 m (26.2 ft)
- Highest elevation: 46 m (151 ft)
- Lowest elevation: 0 m (0 ft)

Population (2024 census)
  - Total: 50,018
  - Density: 304.21/km^{2} (787.90/sq mi)
  - Households: 4,494

Economy
  - Income class: 4th municipal income class
  - Poverty incidence: 46.69% (2023)
  - Revenue: ₱ 133.9 million (2024)
  - Assets: ₱ 57.96 million (2024)
  - Expenditure: ₱ 133.6 million (2024)
  - Liabilities: ₱ 1.164 million (2024)

Service provider
  - Electricity: Maguindanao Electric Cooperative (MAGELCO)
- Time zone: UTC+8 (PST)
- ZIP code
- PSGC: 1903837000
- IDD : area code: +63 (0)64
- Native languages: Maguindanao; Tagalog

Shariff Saydona Mustapha, officially the Municipality of Shariff Saydona Mustapha (Maguindanaon: Inged nu Shariff Saydona Mustapha; Iranun: Inged a Shariff Saydona Mustapha; Tagalog: Bayan ng Shariff Saydona Mustapha), is a municipality in the province of Maguindanao del Sur, Philippines. According to the 2024 census, it had a population of 50,018.

== History ==
It was created out of 4 barangays from the municipality of Shariff Aguak, 4 entire barangays and a portion of one barangay from Mamasapano, 2 barangays from Datu Unsay, one barangay from Datu Piang, and 3 entire barangays and a portion of one barangay from Datu Saudi Ampatuan by virtue of Muslim Mindanao Autonomy Act No. 225 (as amended by MMAA Act No. 252), which was subsequently ratified in a plebiscite held on July 30, 2009.

Shariff Saydona Mustapha was an Arab missionary from Mecca and a paternal uncle of Shariff Kabungsuwan of Johore (the first Sultan of Maguindanao). He arrived in Mainland Mindanao in the mid-15th century. He is the ancestor of the Ampatuan, Mangacop, Masukat and Sangki clans of Maguindanao.

== Geography ==
=== Barangays ===
Shariff Saydona Mustapha is politically subdivided into 16 barangays. Each barangay consists of puroks while some have sitios.

- Bakat
- Dale-Bong
- Dasawao
- Datu Bakal
- Datu Kilay
- Duguengen
- Ganta
- Inaladan
- Libutan
- Linantangan
- Nabundas
- Pagatin
- Pagatin (Pagatin I)
- Pamalian
- Pikeg
- Pusao

=== Climate ===
Climate data for Shariff Saydona Mustapha, Maguindanao del Sur
Month	Jan	Feb	Mar	Apr	May	Jun	Jul	Aug	Sep	Oct	Nov	Dec	Year
Mean daily maximum °C (°F)	32 (90)	32 (90)	33 (91)	33 (91)	32 (90)	31 (88)	30 (86)	31 (88)	31 (88)	31 (88)	31 (88)	31 (88)	32 (89)
Mean daily minimum °C (°F)	21 (70)	21 (70)	21 (70)	22 (72)	23 (73)	23 (73)	23 (73)	23 (73)	23 (73)	23 (73)	23 (73)	22 (72)	22 (72)
Average precipitation mm (inches)	19 (0.7)	14 (0.6)	15 (0.6)	18 (0.7)	33 (1.3)	42 (1.7)	44 (1.7)	42 (1.7)	30 (1.2)	31 (1.2)	28 (1.1)	17 (0.7)	333 (13.2)
Average rainy days	6.9	5.6	6.9	8.1	15.1	17.5	17.8	18.5	14.9	14.9	12.4	8.0	146.6
Source: Meteoblue (modeled/calculated data, not measured locally)

== Demographics ==
Population census of Shariff Saydona Mustapha
Year	Pop.	±% p.a.
2010	16,442	—
2015	19,855	+3.66%
2020	25,080	+5.04%
2024	50,018	+18.03%
Source: Philippine Statistics Authority

== Economy ==
Poverty Incidence of Shariff Saydona Mustapha

Source: Philippine Statistics Authority
