= Shariff Aguak =

Municipality in Maguindanao del Sur, Philippines

Shariff Aguak Maganoy
- Municipality
- Municipality of Shariff Aguak
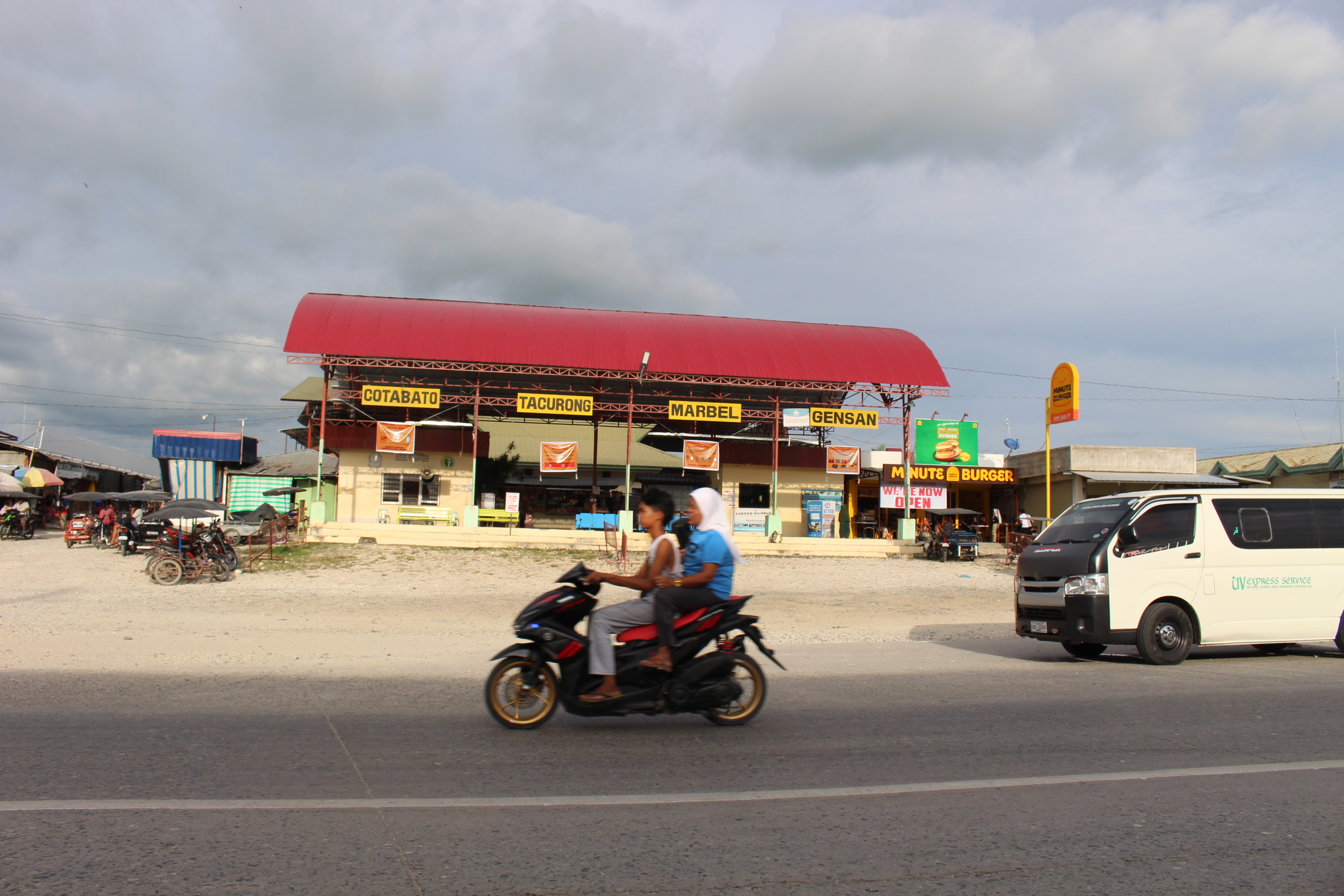
- Public Terminal at Poblacion

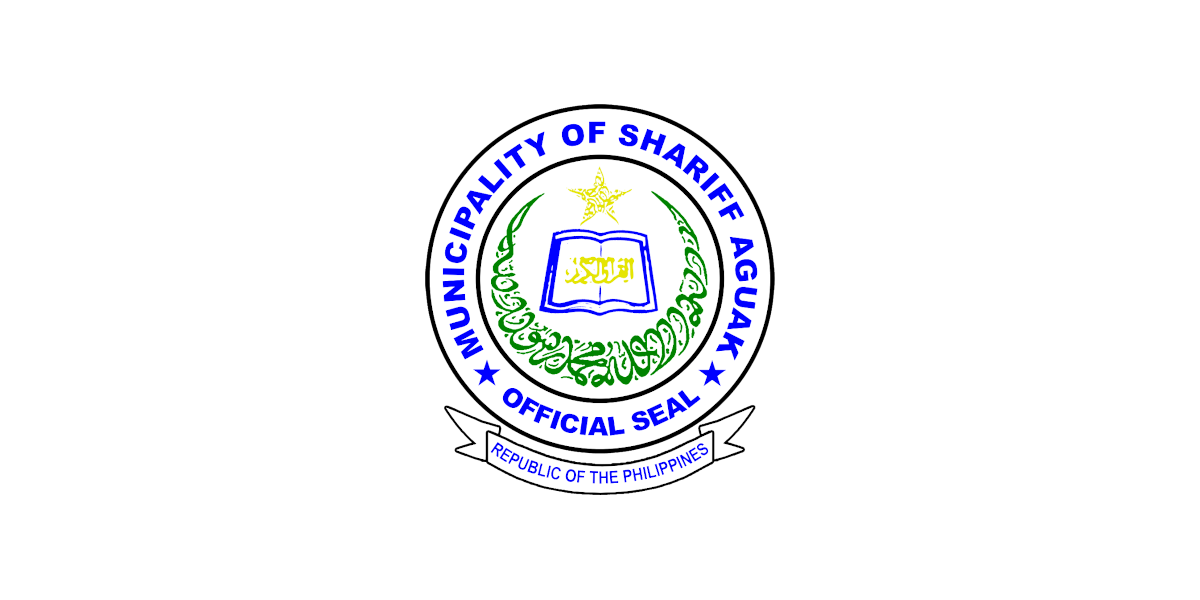
- Flag Seal

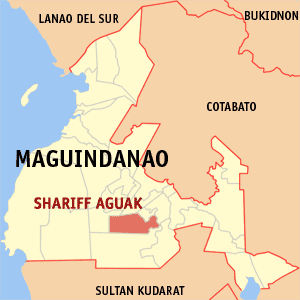
- Map of Maguindanao del Sur with Shariff Aguak highlighted
- Interactive map of Shariff Aguak
- Location within the Philippines
- Coordinates: 6°51′53″N 124°26′30″E
- Country: Philippines
- Region: Bangsamoro Autonomous Region in Muslim Mindanao
- Province: Maguindanao del Sur
- House district: Lone district
- Parliamentary district: 3rd district
- Founded: September 11, 1963
- Named for: Shariff Aguak
- Barangays: 13 (see Barangays)

Government
  - Type: Sangguniang Bayan
  - Mayor: Akmad B. Ampatuan
  - Vice Mayor: Mohamad Akmad B. Ampatuan Jr.
  - House Representative: Esmael Mangudadatu
  - Municipal Council: Members: Abby B. Aguak; Ritchie B. Ampatuan; Watari S. Baganian; Al-Shariff Aguak S. Ampatuan; Pendatun U. Ampatuan; Emran A. Dawaling; Cashmer D. Ampatuan; Alejandre L. Ampatuan
  - Electorate: 17,711 voters (2025)

Area
  - Total: 392.70 km^{2} (151.62 sq mi)
- Elevation: 69 m (226 ft)
- Highest elevation: 500 m (1,600 ft)
- Lowest elevation: 13 m (43 ft)

Population (2024 census)
  - Total: 29,707
  - Density: 75.648/km^{2} (195.93/sq mi)
  - Households: 5,347

Economy
  - Income class: 2nd municipal income class
  - Poverty incidence: 35.9% (2023)
  - Revenue: ₱ 195.3 million (2024)
  - Assets: ₱ 269.9 million (2024)
  - Expenditure: ₱ 202.7 million (2024)
  - Liabilities: ₱ 151.1 million (2024)

Service provider
  - Electricity: Maguindanao Electric Cooperative (MAGELCO)
- Time zone: UTC+8 (PST)
- ZIP code: 9608
- PSGC: 1903808000
- IDD : area code: +63 (0)64
- Native languages: Maguindanao; Tagalog
- Website: www.maganoy.gov.ph

Shariff Aguak, officially the Municipality of Shariff Aguak (Maguindanaoan: Kuta Shariff Aguak), is a municipality in the province of Maguindanao del Sur, Philippines. According to the 2024 census, it had a population of 29,707.

It was formerly officially known as Maganoy.

Despite only being the de jure (by law) seat of Maguindanao's provincial government from 1973 to 1977, the town—being home to several previous governors—has served as the de facto (by practice) capital during the governorships of Sandiale Sambolawan (1980–1986), Andal Ampatuan, Sr. (2001–2008) and Sajid Ampatuan (2008–2009).

== History ==
Shariff Aguak was founded as Maganoy in September 11, 1963, when President Diosdado Macapagal signed Executive Order No. 47 stipulating the creation of the municipality within the old province of Cotabato. It was created from the southern 28 barangays of Datu Piang.

The town's name was changed from Maganoy to Shariff Aguak by virtue of Muslim Mindanao Autonomy Act No. 45 in 1996.

On July 30, 2009, upon the ratification of Muslim Mindanao Autonomy Acts No. 225 (as amended by MMAA 252) and MMAA 220, the municipalities of Shariff Saydona Mustapha and Datu Hoffer Ampatuan, respectively, were created from a total of 13 barangays of the 26 Shariff Aguak, in addition to other barangays from Datu Piang, Datu Saudi Ampatuan, Datu Unsay and Mamasapano.

Shariff Aguak (then Maganoy) was Maguindanao's provincial capital from its creation in 1973 to 1977. In 1977, President Ferdinand Marcos moved the province's seat of government to the municipality of Sultan Kudarat by virtue of Presidential Decree No. 1170. Batas Pambansa Blg. 211, enacted in 1982, aimed to formally restore the status of Maganoy as Maguindanao's seat of provincial government but the plebiscite scheduled for December 18, 1982 was never administered, thereby making the law not legally binding. However, the town has served as the de facto capital during the tenure of previous governors who hails from the town. By law (de jure), Sultan Kudarat was historically recognized as the capital of Maguindanao from 1977 until 2014 when the Sangguniang Panlalawigan of Maguindanao approved a resolution formally recognizing Buluan as the new provincial capital. In 2019 incumbent Governor Bai Mariam Mangudadatu expressed plans to move the provincial capitol back to Shariff Aguak.

Pending the completion of the new provincial capitol complex at Buluan, the executive branch of provincial government holds offices in that town's Rajah Buayan Silongan Peace Center. On the other hand, the legislative branch of provincial government, the Sangguniang Panlalawigan of Maguindanao, continues to hold sessions in the rehabilitated buildings of the old provincial capitol in Barangay Simuay Crossing in the town of Sultan Kudarat. The Ampatuan-built former provincial capitol complex in Shariff Aguak, initially planned to be converted for public school use, is set to become the new regional headquarters of ARMM's Bureau of Fire Protection but eventually became an infantry brigade of the Philippine Army.

On January 25, 2026, there was an attempted assassination against the town’s mayor, Akmad B. Ampatuan. The armored vehicle he was riding in was attacked using an RPG-2 (B-40) anti-tank weapon and an automatic rifle. He managed to survive although two of his bodyguards were injured, while the three attackers died on the spot.

== Geography ==
=== Barangays ===
Shariff Aguak is politically subdivided into 13 barangays. Each barangay consists of puroks while some have sitios.

- Bagong
- Bialong
- Kuloy
- Labu-labu
- Lapok (Lepok)
- Malingao
- Poblacion
- Poblacion I
- Poblacion II
- Satan
- Tapikan
- Timbangan
- Tina

=== Climate ===
Climate data for Shariff Aguak, Maguindanao del Sur
Month	Jan	Feb	Mar	Apr	May	Jun	Jul	Aug	Sep	Oct	Nov	Dec	Year
Mean daily maximum °C (°F)	31 (88)	32 (90)	32 (90)	32 (90)	31 (88)	29 (84)	29 (84)	29 (84)	30 (86)	30 (86)	30 (86)	31 (88)	31 (87)
Mean daily minimum °C (°F)	21 (70)	21 (70)	21 (70)	23 (73)	23 (73)	23 (73)	23 (73)	23 (73)	23 (73)	23 (73)	23 (73)	22 (72)	22 (72)
Average precipitation mm (inches)	30 (1.2)	19 (0.7)	25 (1.0)	24 (0.9)	64 (2.5)	88 (3.5)	102 (4.0)	105 (4.1)	76 (3.0)	82 (3.2)	60 (2.4)	26 (1.0)	701 (27.5)
Average rainy days	9.8	8.5	11.3	11.9	21.6	23.9	24.1	24.5	20.9	21.8	16.8	11.8	206.9
Source: Meteoblue (modeled/calculated data, not measured locally)

== Demographics ==
Population census of Shariff Aguak

Year	Pop.	±% p.a.
1970	33,846	—
1975	46,257	+6.47%
1980	45,845	−0.18%
1990	52,475	+1.36%
1995	53,110	+0.23%
2000	49,531	−1.48%

Year	Pop.	±% p.a.
2007	70,340	+4.96%
2010	34,376	−22.94%
2015	31,692	−1.54%
2020	33,982	+1.48%
2024	29,707	−3.18%

Source: Philippine Statistics Authority

== Economy ==
Poverty Incidence of Shariff Aguak

Source: Philippine Statistics Authority

== Government ==
=== List of former chief executives ===
1. Datu Akilan Ampatuan
2. Datu Pinagayaw Ampatuan
3. Datu Zainudin Ampatuan
4. Datu Rustom Upam Ampatuan
5. Datu Andal Salibo Ampatuan Sr.(1988–1998)
6. Datu Zaldy Uy Ampatuan (2001–2005)
7. Datu Anwar Uy Ampatuan (2005–2009)
8. Datu Monir Ampatuan Asim Jr. (2009–2010)
9. Bai Zahara Upam Ampatuan (2010–2015)
10. Datu Marop Baganian Ampatuan (2015–2021)
11. Akmad Ampatuan (2022–present)

== See also ==
- List of renamed cities and municipalities in the Philippines
