= Maguindanao del Sur =

Province in Bangsamoro, Philippines

- Province
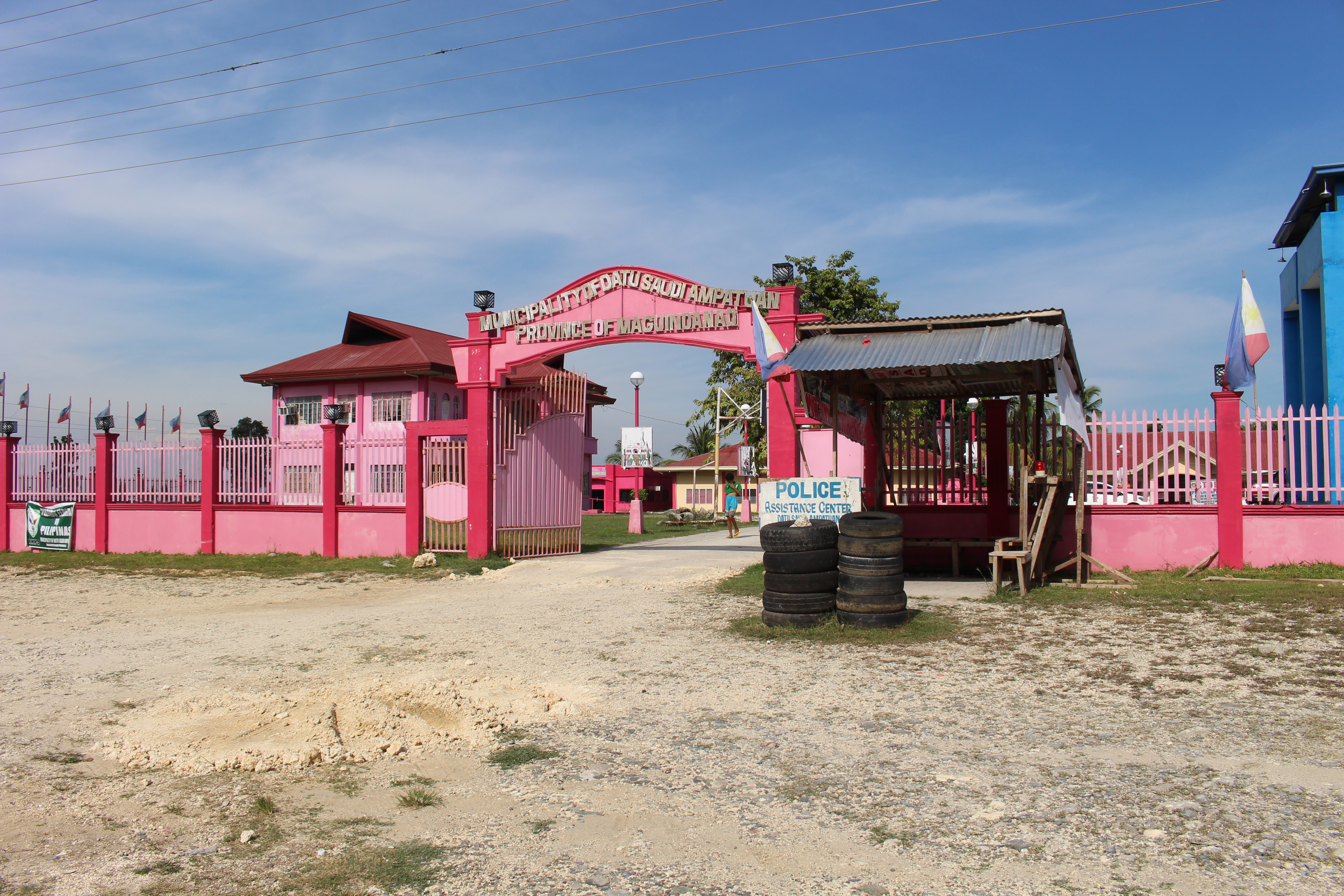
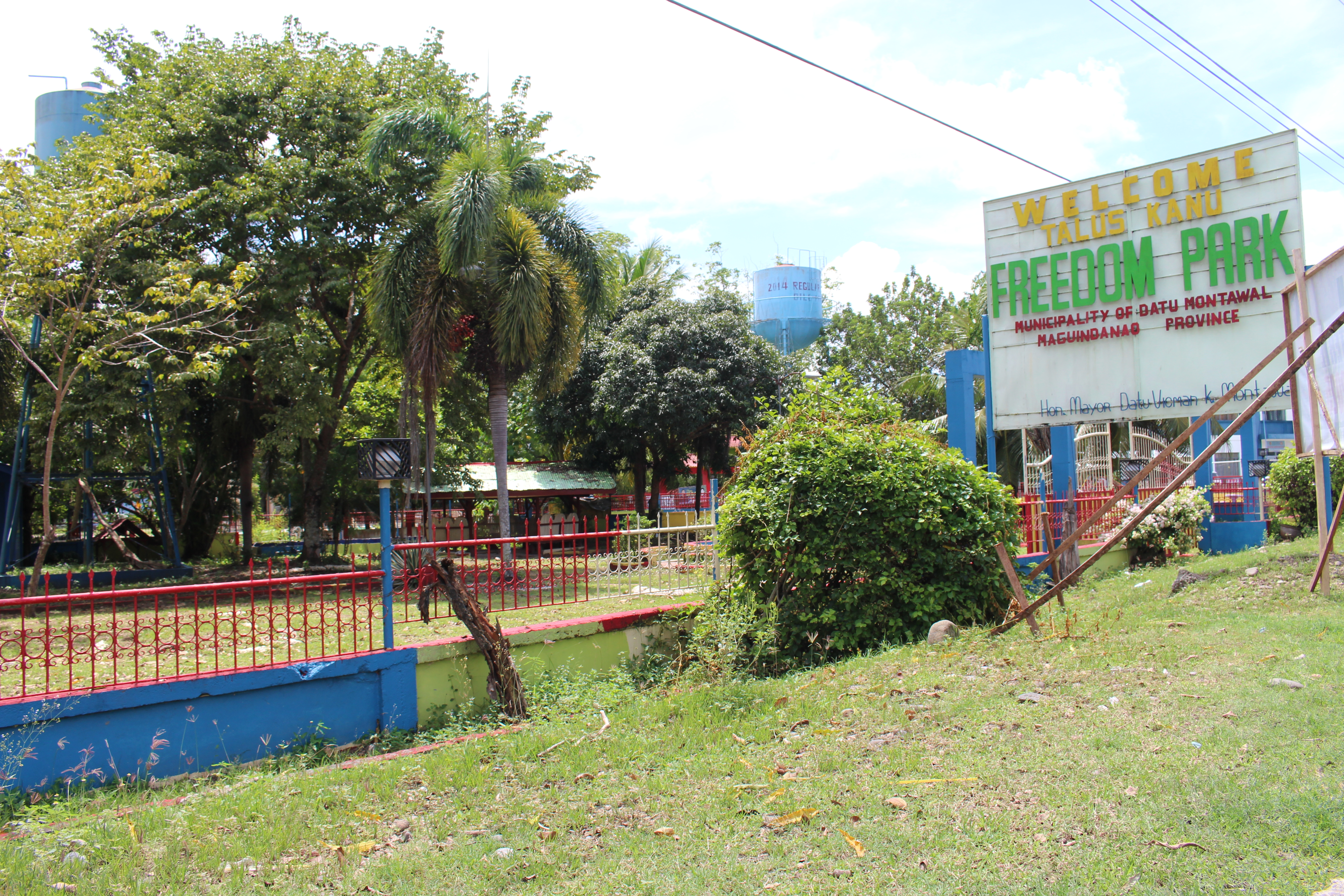
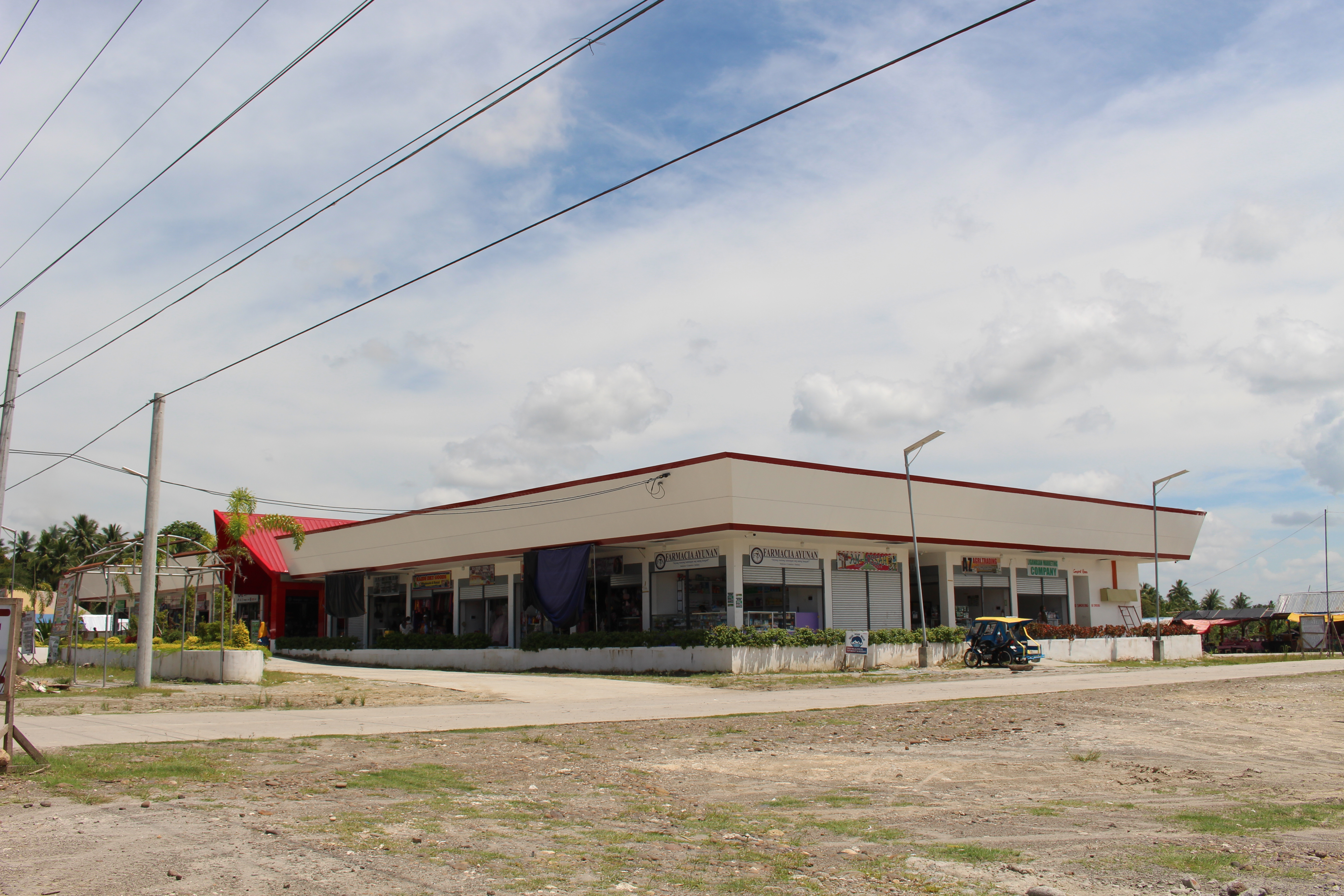
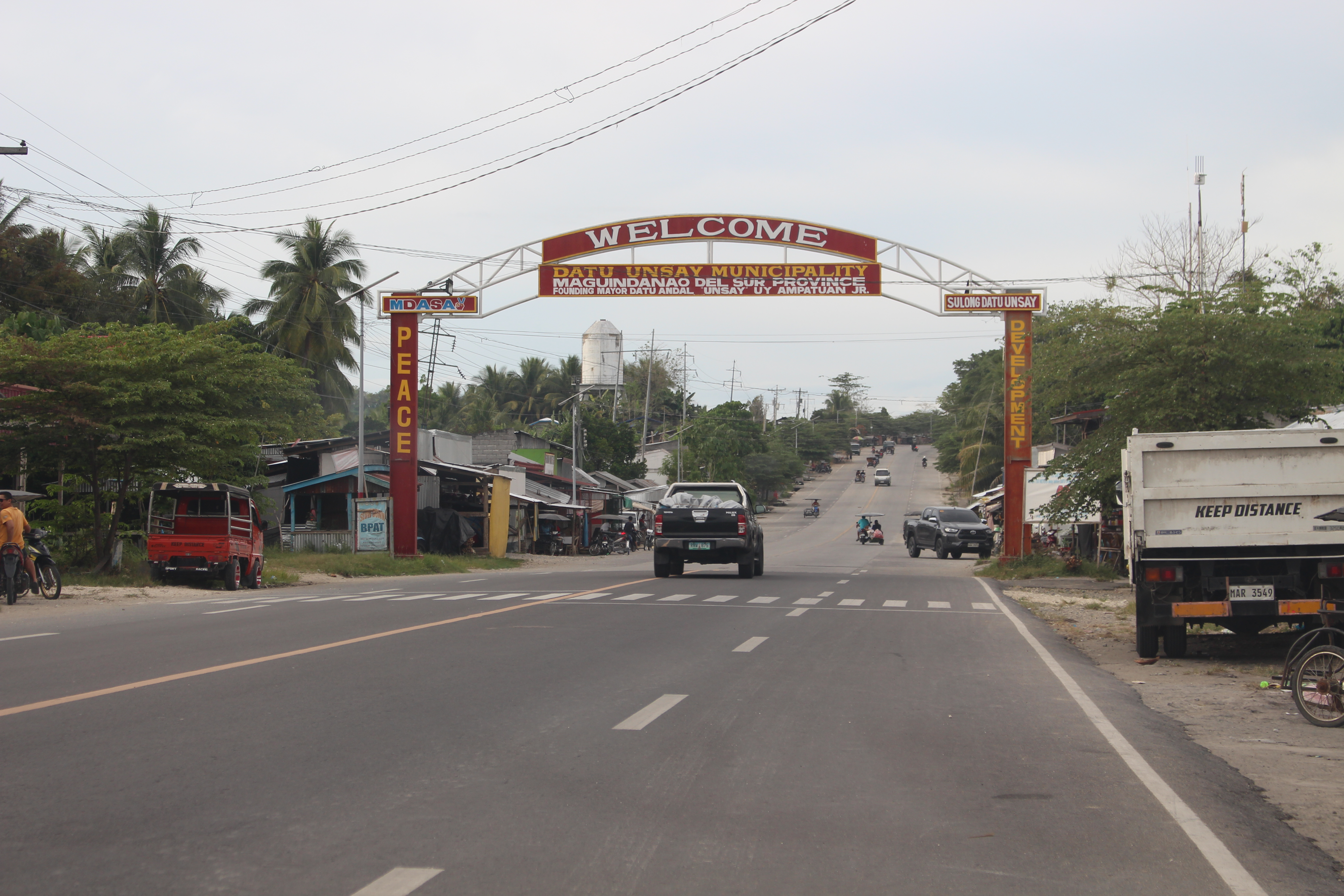
- (from top: left to right) Dimaukom Mosque, Provincial Capitol, Municipal Complex of Datu Saudi Ampatuan, Freedom Park in Datu Montawal, Pagalungan Integrated Terminal, Archway Sign in Datu Unsay.

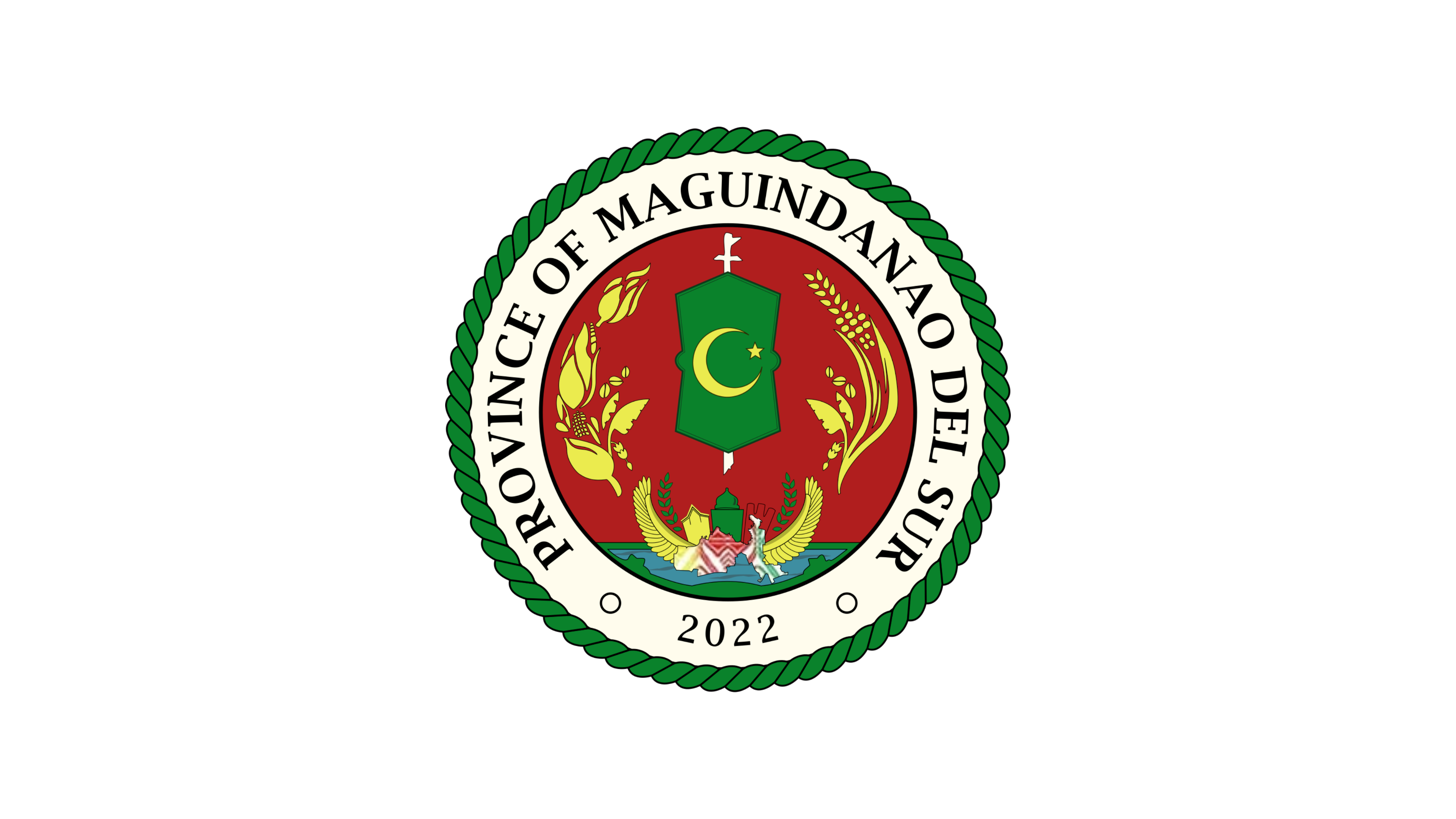
- Flag Seal

- Location in the Philippines
- Interactive map of Maguindanao del Sur
- Coordinates: 06°55′N 124°34′E
- Country: Philippines
- Region: Bangsamoro
- Founded: September 17, 2022
- Effectivity: January 9, 2023
- Capital and largest municipality: Buluan

Government
  - Governor: Ali Midtimbang
  - Vice Governor: Hisham Nando
  - Representative: Esmael Mangudadatu
  - Legislature: Maguindanao del Sur Provincial Board
  - Electorate: 451,687 voters (2025)

Area
  - Total: 5,471.74 km^{2} (2,112.65 sq mi)

Population (2024 census)
  - Total: 813,243
  - Density: 148.626/km^{2} (384.940/sq mi)
- Demonym: South Magindanawon

Divisions
  - Independent cities: 0
  - Component cities: 0
  - Municipalities: 24: Ampatuan; Buluan; Datu Abdullah Sangki; Datu Anggal Midtimbang; Datu Hoffer Ampatuan; Datu Montawal; Datu Paglas; Datu Piang; Datu Salibo; Datu Saudi Ampatuan; Datu Unsay; General Salipada K. Pendatun; Guindulungan; Mamasapano; Mangudadatu; Pagalungan; Paglat; Pandag; Rajah Buayan; Shariff Aguak; Shariff Saydona Mustapha; South Upi; Sultan sa Barongis; Talayan
  - Districts: Legislative districts of Maguindanao del Sur

Economy
  - Income class: 1st provincial income class
  - Poverty incidence: 32.1% (2023)
  - Revenue: ₱ 2,175 million (2024)
  - Assets: ₱ 3,167 million (2024)
  - Expenditure: ₱ 2,130 million (2024)
  - Liabilities: ₱ 1,223 million (2024)
- Time zone: UTC+8 (PHT)
- ISO 3166 code: PH-MGS
- Spoken languages: Maguindanaon; Tiruray; Tagalog; English

Maguindanao del Sur, officially the Province of Maguindanao del Sur, is a landlocked province in the Philippines located in the Bangsamoro region in Mindanao. Its capital is the municipality of Buluan near the city of Tacurong in the neighboring province of Sultan Kudarat. It borders Cotabato province to the east, Maguindanao del Norte to the west, and Sultan Kudarat to the south.

== History ==
Historical affiliations

Spain 1521–1898
United States of America 1898–1942
Japan 1942–1945
United States of America 1945–1946
Philippines 1946–present

=== Foundation ===
Maguindanao del Sur was formed when Maguindanao province was split into two provinces; the other province being Maguindanao del Norte. The division occurred following a plebiscite on September 17, 2022 which ratified Republic Act 11550 which proposed the partitioning of the province. As per law former Maguindanao Governor Mariam Mangudadatu was expected to become the governor of the newly formed Maguindanao del Sur province. However an issue arose since the determination of the first set of officials of the province presumes that the plebiscite was held prior to the 2022 national and local elections. However the plebiscite was postponed to a date after the elections. This led to the Commission on Elections to come up with a legal opinion. The position was issued on September 28, 2022, where the election body conclude that only the Department of the Interior and Local Government could appoint the first officials of the province.

Mangudadatu would assume the position and take oath as governor of the new province in October 13, 2022. Nathaniel Midtimbang, a member of the Maguindanao Provincial Board, became her vice governor. A transition period would take place until January 9, 2023.

== Geography ==
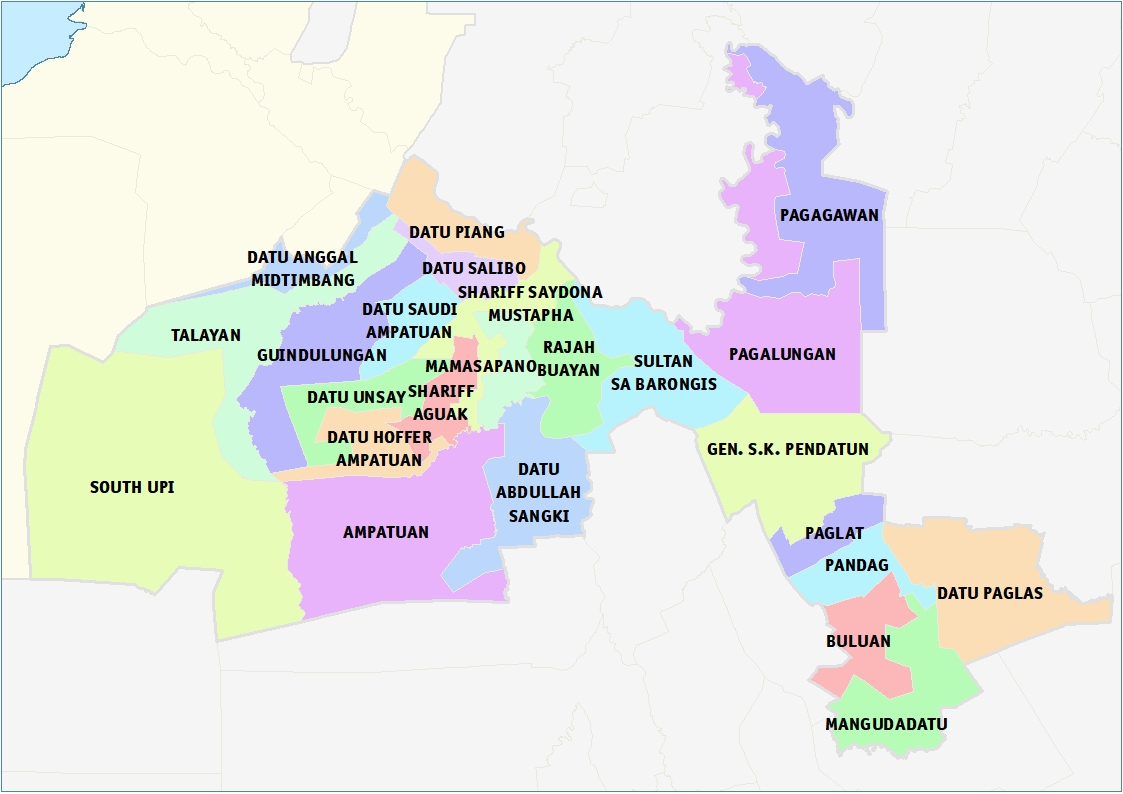
Map of Maguindanao del Sur

Maguindanao del Sur is composed of 24 municipalities and 2 legislative districts. It has a total area of 4,973.48 square meters (53,534.1 sq ft). Being landlocked, it is bounded by Maguindanao del Norte to the west, Cotabato to the north and east, and Sultan Kudarat to the south.

- † Capital municipality
- Municipality

City or municipality		DistrictPSGC unknown	Population			±% p.a.	AreaPSGC unknown		Density		Barangay	Coordinates^{[A]}
			(2015)		(2010)		km^{2}	sq mi	/km^{2}	/sq mi		
Ampatuan		1st	2.1%	24,801	17,800	6.52%	255.40	98.61	97	250	11	6°49′58″N 124°27′34″E
Buluan	†	2nd	4.3%	50,008	38,106	5.31%	699.50	270.08	71	180	7	6°43′09″N 124°47′32″E
Datu Abdullah Sangki		1st	2.0%	23,878	17,079	6.59%	220.00	84.94	110	280	10	6°46′43″N 124°28′36″E
Datu Anggal Midtimbang		1st	2.1%	25,016	13,339	12.72%	85.43	32.98	290	750	7	7°00′35″N 124°19′40″E
Datu Hoffer Ampatuan		1st	2.1%	25,012	16,295	8.50%	193.45	74.69	130	340	11	6°51′05″N 124°25′48″E
Datu Montawal		2nd	3.0%	34,820	31,265	2.07%	31.74	12.25	1,100	2,800	11	7°04′40″N 124°44′55″E
Datu Paglas		2nd	2.4%	28,387	20,290	6.60%	132.10	51.00	210	540	23	6°44′47″N 124°52′20″E
Datu Piang		1st	2.2%	25,600	28,492	−2.02%	302.97	116.98	84	220	16	7°01′44″N 124°29′58″E
Datu Salibo		1st	1.3%	14,947	15,062	−0.15%	150.62	58.15	99	260	17	7°01′10″N 124°28′25″E
Datu Saudi Ampatuan		1st	2.3%	26,427	20,330	5.12%	60.16	23.23	440	1,100	8	6°55′34″N 124°24′50″E
Datu Unsay		1st	1.0%	11,813	12,490	−1.06%	95.39	36.83	120	310	8	6°53′25″N 124°25′57″E
General Salipada K. Pendatun		2nd	2.4%	28,103	24,004	3.05%	189.37	73.12	150	390	19	6°49′34″N 124°45′13″E
Guindulungan		1st	1.7%	19,911	16,071	4.16%	130.68	50.46	150	390	11	6°57′22″N 124°23′51″E
Mamasapano		1st	2.1%	24,800	22,354	2.00%	85.31	32.94	290	750	14	6°53′42″N 124°30′17″E
Mangudadatu		2nd	2.1%	25,046	14,864	10.44%	98.16	37.90	260	670	8	6°41′28″N 124°48′05″E
Pagalungan		2nd	3.4%	39,653	31,891	4.24%	898.76	347.01	44	110	12	7°03′18″N 124°42′00″E
Paglat		2nd	1.4%	15,920	11,207	6.91%	177.74	68.63	90	230	8	6°48′36″N 124°46′58″E
Pandag		2nd	2.1%	25,057	13,795	12.04%	85.31	32.94	290	750	8	6°45′22″N 124°47′20″E
Rajah Buayan		2nd	2.0%	23,652	17,423	5.99%	71.98	27.79	330	850	11	6°54′28″N 124°33′02″E
Shariff Aguak		1st	2.7%	31,692	34,376	−1.54%	392.70	151.62	81	210	13	6°51′40″N 124°26′41″E
Shariff Saydona Mustapha		1st	1.7%	19,855	16,442	3.66%	164.42	63.48	120	310	16	6°58′34″N 124°28′56″E
South Upi		1st	3.4%	40,178	35,990	2.12%	184.80	71.35	220	570	11	6°51′18″N 124°08′36″E
Sultan sa Barongis		2nd	1.9%	22,425	22,547	−0.10%	291.30	112.47	77	200	12	6°52′56″N 124°36′01″E
Talayan		1st	2.6%	30,032	16,042	12.68%	143.84	55.54	210	540	15	6°59′04″N 124°21′21″E
Total^{[B]}				637,033	507,554	4.42%	—^{[C]}	—^{[C]}	—^{[C]}	—^{[C]}	287	(see GeoGroup box)
1. Coordinates are sortable by latitude. (Italicized entries indicate the generic location. Otherwise, they mark the city or town center).; 2. Dashes (—) in cells indicate unavailable information.

== Demographics ==
Population Census of Maguindanao del Sur
Year	Pop.	±% p.a.
1903	87	—
1918	49,868	+52.72%
1939	83,968	+2.51%
1948	139,403	+5.79%
1960	214,514	+3.66%
1970	190,151	−1.20%
1975	162,626	−3.09%
1980	198,079	+4.02%
1990	280,161	+3.53%
1995	337,730	+3.56%
2000	365,081	+1.68%
2010	520,882	+3.62%
2015	651,896	+4.37%
2020	741,221	+2.74%
2024	813,243	+2.25%
^{a} No census was held in 1985 due to a political and economic crisis^{b} Census was delayed from the original 2005 due to the reenacted budget that lasted until 2006 Source: National Census and Statistics Office (1975, 1980, and 1990 census), National Statistics Office (1995, 2000, 2007, and 2010

According to the 2024 census conducted before the province's creation, Maguindanao del Sur has a population of 813,243 people, with a population density of 160 inhabitants per square kilometer or 410 inhabitants per square mile. The predominant ethnic group is the Maguindanaon.

Population percentage
(2020 Census)

- Ampatuan: 24,801 (3.8%)
- Buluan: 50,008 (7.6%)
- Datu Abdullah Sangki: 23,878 (3.6%)
- Datu Anggal Midtimbang: 25,016 (3.8%)
- Datu Hoffer Ampatuan: 25,012 (3.8%)
- Datu Montawal: 34,820 (5.3%)
- Datu Paglas: 28,387 (4.3%)
- Datu Piang: 25,600 (3.9%)
- Datu Salibo: 14,947 (2.3%)
- Datu Saudi Ampatuan: 26,427 (4.0%)
- Datu Unsay: 11,813 (1.8%)
- General Salipada K. Pendatun: 28,103 (4.3%)
- Guindulungan: 19,911 (3.0%)
- Mamasapano: 24,800 (3.8%)
- Mangudadatu: 25,046 (3.8%)
- Pagalungan: 39,653 (6.1%)
- Paglat: 15,920 (2.4%)
- Pandag: 25,057 (3.8%)
- Rajah Buayan: 23,652 (3.6%)
- Shariff Aguak: 31,692 (4.8%)
- Shariff Saydona Mustapha: 19,855 (3.0%)
- South Upi: 40,178 (6.1%)
- Sultan sa Barongis: 22,425 (3.4%)
- Sultan Sumagka: 17,463 (2.7%)
- Talayan: 30,032 (4.6%)
Total population: 741,221

== Economy ==
According to the Philippine Statistics Authority, registered economic growth of the province had decelerated from 10.2 percent (before its establishment) to 6.7 percent in 2022.

Agricultural growth from forestry and fishery had a growth declined to 5.2 percent. However, economic growth from services grew by 8.9 percent. Among services, accommodation and food services accounted for 31.7 percent.

== Notable people ==
- Lav Diaz – filmmaker
