= Purok =

Subdivision in the Philippines

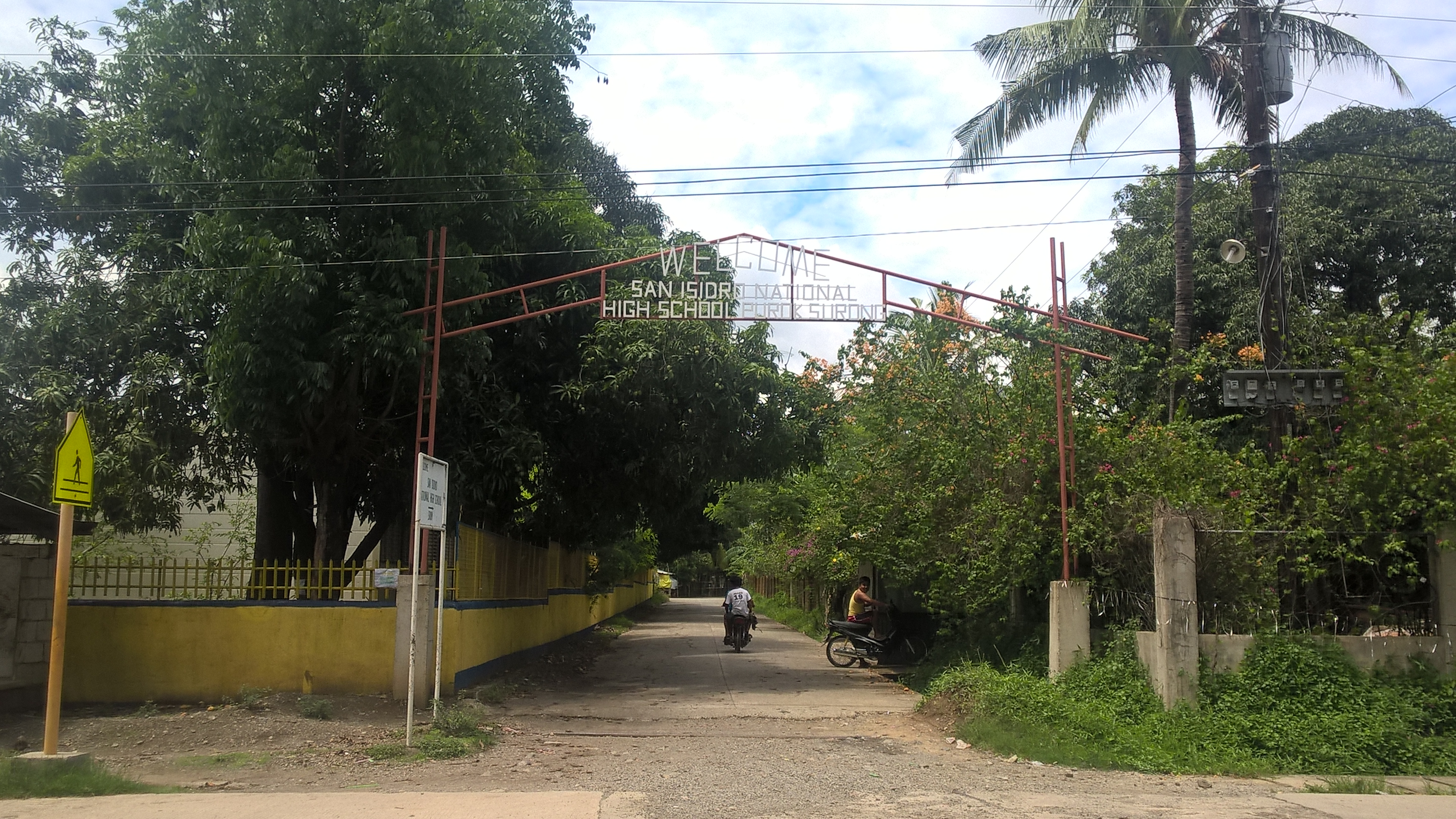
- Welcome arch of a purok
- Category: Zone
- Location: Philippines
- Found in: Barangay

A purok (English: district or zone) is an informal division within a barangay in the Philippines. While not officially considered a local government unit (LGU), a purok often serves as a unit for delivering services and administration within a barangay.

A purok is typically composed of twenty to fifty or more households, depending on the particular geographical location and cluster of houses. The term purok is often applied to a neighborhood (zone) within an urbanized barangay, or a portion (district) of a less densely populated, but still relatively geographically compact, barangay. This contrasts with the sitio, which is usually a cluster of households (hamlet) in a more dispersed, rural barangay.

If created and given a mandate by an ordinance of the barangay, municipality, or city, a purok could perform government functions under the coordination and supervision of their local officials. Sometimes, a barangay councilor may be recognized as the leader of their purok.

New barangays are often created by officially enumerating which puroks and/or sitios are included within the territory. On rare occasions, a purok may also be enumerated in the creation of a municipality, as in the case of Shariff Saydona Mustapha, Maguindanao del Sur, where the puroks of Libutan East and Pagatin I were directly named as one of the constituent parts of the new municipality. These two puroks were later recognized as full-fledged barangays by the Philippine Statistics Authority in early 2010.

The purok system gained international acclaim when the Camotes Islands of Cebu province utilized it for disaster preparedness in the onslaught of Typhoon Haiyan in 2013, allowing the island group's community to achieve a zero casualty record amid the property devastation it otherwise suffered alongside other areas within the "Yolanda corridor". The Camotes town of San Francisco received the Sasakawa Award from the United Nations Office for Disaster Risk Reduction for this organized system, two years prior to Yolanda.

== See also ==
- Sitio
- Poblacion
