= List of current members of the Bangsamoro Parliament =

Parliament composition by district and party BFP UBJP BGC SIAP Al Ittihad–UKB PBP Raayat

This is a list of individuals serving in the Bangsamoro Parliament in the 1st Bangsamoro Parliament as of October 30, 2026. The current membership of the Parliament comprises 40 members of Parliament (MPs) elected via proportional representation, 36 electoral district MPs, two sectoral representatives, and two representatives of non-Moro Indigenous Peoples. At present, there are 80 members of Parliament.

== Composition ==
=== Current composition by party ===
Parliament composition by party BFP UBJP BGC SIAP Al Ittihad–UKB PBP Raayat Nonpartisan

Composition of the Parliament as of October 30, 2026:
| Party/Group | Seats |
|---|---|
| Bangsamoro Federalist Party | 31 |
| United Bangsamoro Justice Party | 30 (Note: Includes six sectoral representative seats.) |
| BARMM Grand Coalition | 8 |
| Serbisyong Inklusibo–Alyansang Progresibo (Note: Member party of the BARMM Grand Coalition.) | 6 |
| Al Ittihad–UKB Party | 1 |
| Progresibong Bangsamoro Party | 1 |
| Raayat Democratic Party | 1 |
| Non-Moro Indigenous Peoples | 2 |
| Total | 80 |

=== Current composition by bloc ===
| Party | Bloc | |
| Party | Majority | Minority |
|---|---|---|
| Bangsamoro Federalist Party | 31 | 0 |
| United Bangsamoro Justice Party | 4 | 26 |
| BARMM Grand Coalition | 8 | 0 |
| Serbisyong Inklusibo–Alyansang Progresibo | 6 | 0 |
| Al Ittihad–UKB Party | 0 | 1 |
| Progresibong Bangsamoro Party | 1 | 0 |
| Raayat Democratic Party | 1 | 0 |
| Non-Moro Indigenous Peoples | 2 | 0 |
| Total | 53 | 27 |

== Leadership ==
=== Presiding officers ===
| Office | Officer | | Constituency | Since |
|---|---|---|---|---|
| Speaker of the Parliament | Amer Zaakaria Rakim | BGC | Proportional representation | October 30, 2026 |
| Deputy Speakers | Abrar Hataman | BFP | Basilan–3rd | October 30, 2026 |
| Deputy Speakers | Tina Matolo | BFP | Tawi-Tawi–3rd | October 30, 2026 |
| Deputy Speakers | Tawakal Midtimbang | UBJP | Maguindanao del Sur–1st | October 30, 2026 |
| Deputy Speakers | Amil Bahar Mawallil | BGC | Proportional representation | October 30, 2026 |
| Deputy Speakers | Ibrahim Ibay | BFP | Maguindanao del Norte–2nd | October 30, 2026 |
| Deputy Speakers | Hosni Macapodi | SIAP | Lanao del Sur–6th | October 30, 2026 |
| Deputy Speakers | Lampa Pandi | UBJP | Lanao del Sur–4th | October 30, 2026 |
| Deputy Speakers | Amir Balindong | UBJP | Proportional representation | October 30, 2026 |
| Deputy Speakers | Suwaib Oranon | BFP | Proportional representation | October 30, 2026 |
| Deputy Speakers | Jose Lorena | Raayat | Proportional representation | October 30, 2026 |

=== Majority leadership ===
| Office | Officer | | Constituency | Since |
|---|---|---|---|---|
| Majority Floor Leader | Johari Abu | BFP | Proportional representation | October 30, 2026 |
| Deputy Majority Floor Leaders | Abdel Razi Amin | BGC | Proportional representation | October 30, 2026 |
| Deputy Majority Floor Leaders | Naguib Sinarimbo | BFP | Cotabato City–2nd | October 30, 2026 |
| Deputy Majority Floor Leaders | Ishak Mastura | BFP | Maguindanao del Norte–5th | October 30, 2026 |
| Deputy Majority Floor Leaders | Jaafar Apollo Mikhail Matalam | BFP | Proportional representation | October 30, 2026 |
| Deputy Majority Floor Leaders | Alindatu Pagayao | BFP | Proportional representation | October 30, 2026 |
| Deputy Majority Floor Leaders | Jay Hataman Salliman | BFP | Basilan–4th | October 30, 2026 |
| Deputy Majority Floor Leaders | Julbert Que | BFP | Tawi-Tawi–1st | October 30, 2026 |

== List of MPs ==
List of MPs as of October 30, 2026:
| Constituency | Portrait | MP | Party | Bloc | Born | Took office |
|---|---|---|---|---|---|---|
| Basilan–1st | | Rima Hassan | BFP | Majority | May 4, 1962 (age 64) | October 30, 2026 |
| Basilan–2nd | | Paisal Sali | UBJP | Minority | January 9, 1967 (age 59) | October 30, 2026 |
| Basilan–3rd | | Abrar Hataman | BFP | Majority | August 26, 1999 (age 27) | March 15, 2025 |
| Basilan–4th | | Jay Hataman Salliman | BFP | Majority | April 20, 1997 (age 29) | October 30, 2026 |
| Cotabato City–1st | | Sheriff Abas | UBJP | Minority | May 5, 1979 (age 47) | October 30, 2026 |
| Cotabato City–2nd | | Naguib Sinarimbo | BFP | Majority | January 31, 1972 (age 54) | March 24, 2025 |
| Cotabato City–3rd | | Tomanda Antok | BFP | Majority | March 3, 1963 (age 63) | March 15, 2025 |
| Lanao del Sur–1st | | Pala Gandamra | SIAP | Majority | May 23, 1978 (age 48) | October 30, 2026 |
| Lanao del Sur–2nd | | Hamza Gauraki | UBJP | Majority | September 20, 1985 (age 41) | October 30, 2026 |
| Lanao del Sur–3rd | | Rauf Adiong | SIAP | Majority | November 23, 1996 (age 29) | October 30, 2026 |
| Lanao del Sur–4th | | Lampa Pandi | UBJP | Majority | October 13, 1964 (age 62) | October 30, 2026 |
| Lanao del Sur–5th | | Arimao Asum | SIAP | Majority | July 6, 1953 (age 73) | October 30, 2026 |
| Lanao del Sur–6th | | Hosni Macapodi | SIAP | Majority | December 9, 1981 (age 44) | October 30, 2026 |
| Lanao del Sur–7th | | Rayyan Mindalano | SIAP | Majority | November 29, 1998 (age 27) | October 30, 2026 |
| Lanao del Sur–8th | | Arrie Balindong | UBJP | Majority | January 7, 1978 (age 48) | March 15, 2025 |
| Lanao del Sur–9th | | Rashdi Adiong | SIAP | Majority | June 27, 1958 (age 68) | March 15, 2025 |
| Maguindanao del Norte–1st | | Prince Khalid Tomawis | BFP | Majority | June 9, 1997 (age 29) | October 30, 2026 |
| Maguindanao del Norte–2nd | | Ibrahim Ibay | BFP | Majority | August 15, 1967 (age 59) | March 15, 2025 |
| Maguindanao del Norte–3rd | | Abdulraof Macacua | BFP | Majority | September 13, 1957 (age 69) | March 15, 2025 |
| Maguindanao del Norte–4th | | Abdulnasser Abas | UBJP | Minority | January 1, 1956 (age 70) | October 30, 2026 |
| Maguindanao del Norte–5th | | Ishak Mastura | BFP | Majority | October 22, 1971 (age 55) | August 12, 2022 |
| Maguindanao del Sur–1st | | Tawakal Midtimbang | UBJP | Majority | December 26, 1985 (age 40) | August 12, 2022 |
| Maguindanao del Sur–2nd | | Sajid Andre Ampatuan | BFP | Majority | September 7, 1999 (age 27) | October 30, 2026 |
| Maguindanao del Sur–3rd | | Ali Sangki | Al Ittihad–UKB | Minority | August 6, 1949 (age 77) | October 30, 2026 |
| Maguindanao del Sur–4th | | DJ Parok Mangudadatu | BFP | Majority | August 27, 1995 (age 31) | October 30, 2026 |
| Maguindanao del Sur–5th | | Rafsanjani Ali | BFP | Majority | May 1, 1982 (age 44) | October 30, 2026 |
| Special Geographic Area–1st | | Mansor Ebrahim | UBJP | Minority | December 26, 1977 (age 48) | October 30, 2026 |
| Special Geographic Area–2nd | | Elaysa Enalang | UBJP | Minority | April 17, 1983 (age 43) | October 30, 2026 |
| Tawi-Tawi–1st | | Julbert Que | BFP | Majority | February 6, 1987 (age 39) | October 30, 2026 |
| Tawi-Tawi–2nd | | Hadjimar Matba | PBP | Majority | December 14, 1988 (age 37) | October 30, 2026 |
| Tawi-Tawi–3rd | | Tina Matolo | BFP | Majority | March 3, 1986 (age 40) | October 30, 2026 |
| Tawi-Tawi–4th | | Nur-Mahadil Ahaja | BFP | Majority | April 17, 1975 (age 51) | October 30, 2026 |
| Proportional representation | | Suwaib Oranon | BFP | Majority | January 13, 1953 (age 73) | February 22, 2019 |
| Proportional representation | | Abdulwahid Halil | BFP | Majority | September 22, 1962 (age 64) | October 30, 2026 |
| Proportional representation | | Akmad Brahim | BFP | Majority | May 1, 1948 (age 78) | October 30, 2026 |
| Proportional representation | | Dan Asnawie | BFP | Majority | May 3, 1967 (age 59) | August 12, 2022 |
| Proportional representation | | Abunawas Maslamama | BFP | Majority | September 5, 1957 (age 69) | October 30, 2026 |
| Proportional representation | | Johari Abu | BFP | Majority | June 4, 1985 (age 41) | October 30, 2026 |
| Proportional representation | | Camid Gandamra Jr. | BFP | Majority | March 26, 1977 (age 49) | October 30, 2026 |
| Proportional representation | | Karwin Hamjani | BFP | Majority | April 10, 1997 (age 29) | October 30, 2026 |
| Proportional representation | | Kitem Kadatuan Jr. | BFP | Majority | January 30, 1990 (age 36) | March 15, 2025 |
| Proportional representation | | Michael Midtimbang | BFP | Majority | April 1, 1962 (age 64) | August 12, 2022 |
| Proportional representation | | Suraija Reina Hataman | BFP | Majority | September 9, 1971 (age 55) | October 30, 2026 |
| Proportional representation | | Ma-arouph Candao | BFP | Majority | May 29, 1968 (age 58) | March 15, 2025 |
| Proportional representation | | Alindatu Pagayao | BFP | Majority | February 29, 1960 (age 66) | March 15, 2025 |
| Proportional representation | | Zulfikar-Ali Bayam | BFP | Majority | September 21, 1976 (age 50) | March 15, 2025 |
| Proportional representation | | Jaafar Apollo Mikhail Matalam | BFP | Majority | October 24, 1978 (age 48) | August 12, 2022 |
| Proportional representation | | Junalyn Sumlay | BFP | Majority | June 22, 1977 (age 49) | October 30, 2026 |
| Proportional representation | | Murad Ebrahim | UBJP | Minority | May 21, 1948 (age 78) | October 30, 2026 |
| Proportional representation | | Mohagher Iqbal | UBJP | Minority | February 14, 1947 (age 79) | February 22, 2019 |
| Proportional representation | | Ali Solaiman | UBJP | Minority | June 12, 1952 (age 74) | February 22, 2019 |
| Proportional representation | | Eduard Guerra | UBJP | Minority | February 26, 1955 (age 71) | February 22, 2019 |
| Proportional representation | | Ibrahim Ali | UBJP | Minority | January 20, 1959 (age 67) | October 30, 2026 |
| Proportional representation | | Said Salendab | UBJP | Minority | January 4, 1962 (age 64) | February 22, 2019 |
| Proportional representation | | Mohammad Yacob | UBJP | Minority | April 30, 1970 (age 56) | February 22, 2019 |
| Proportional representation | | Amir Balindong | UBJP | Minority | February 4, 1969 (age 57) | March 15, 2025 |
| Proportional representation | | John Anthony Lim | UBJP | Minority | September 9, 1979 (age 47) | August 12, 2022 |
| Proportional representation | | Haber Asarul | UBJP | Minority | January 6, 1976 (age 50) | March 15, 2025 |
| Proportional representation | | Sha Elijah Dumama-Alba | UBJP | Minority | January 21, 1982 (age 44) | August 12, 2022 |
| Proportional representation | | Nordjiana Dipatuan-Ducol | UBJP | Minority | September 3, 1975 (age 51) | October 30, 2026 |
| Proportional representation | | Raissa Jajurie | UBJP | Minority | March 30, 1967 (age 59) | February 22, 2019 |
| Proportional representation | | Said Shiek | UBJP | Minority | August 24, 1957 (age 69) | February 22, 2019 |
| Proportional representation | | Ali Salik | UBJP | Minority | August 4, 1948 (age 78) | February 22, 2019 |
| Proportional representation | | Mamintal Adiong III | BGC | Majority | December 5, 1991 (age 34) | October 30, 2026 |
| Proportional representation | | Amer Zaakaria Rakim | BGC | Majority | July 22, 1990 (age 36) | March 15, 2025 |
| Proportional representation | | Abdulrahman Mangudadatu | BGC | Majority | December 5, 1999 (age 26) | October 30, 2026 |
| Proportional representation | | Datu Bimbo Sinsuat | BGC | Majority | October 31, 1949 (age 77) | October 30, 2026 |
| Proportional representation | | Hanie Bud | BGC | Majority | June 5, 1978 (age 48) | October 30, 2026 |
| Proportional representation | | Abdel Razi Amin | BGC | Majority | January 21, 1987 (age 39) | October 30, 2026 |
| Proportional representation | | Sittie Aisah Pansar | BGC | Majority | January 9, 1966 (age 60) | October 30, 2026 |
| Proportional representation | | Amil Bahar Mawallil | BGC | Majority | November 14, 1987 (age 38) | October 30, 2026 |
| Proportional representation | | Jose Lorena | Raayat | Majority | August 17, 1954 (age 72) | February 22, 2019 |
| Settler communities | | Mary Ann Arnado | UBJP | Minority | January 19, 1970 (age 56) | October 30, 2026 |
| Settler communities | | Yul Adelfo Olaya | UBJP | Minority | March 13, 1975 (age 51) | October 30, 2026 |
| Traditional leaders | | Marjanie Macasalong | UBJP | Minority | October 29, 1985 (age 41) | October 30, 2026 |
| Ulama | | Muhammad Nadzir Ebil | UBJP | Minority | December 25, 1972 (age 53) | March 15, 2025 |
| Women | | Aida Silongan | UBJP | Minority | August 12, 1964 (age 62) | October 30, 2026 |
| Youth | | Sulfry Abbas | UBJP | Minority | July 12, 2000 (age 26) | October 30, 2026 |
| Non-Moro Indigenous Peoples | | Leticio Datuwata | Lambiangan people | Majority | September 18, 1975 (age 51) | October 30, 2026 |
| Non-Moro Indigenous Peoples | | Jo Genna Jover | Teduray people | Majority | — | October 30, 2026 |

== See also ==
- List of current members of the House of Representatives of the Philippines
