= 1st Bangsamoro Parliament =

First regular parliament of Bangsamoro

←	2nd Bangsamoro Transition Authority Parliament
- Bangsamoro Parliament Building (2021)

Overview
- Legislative body: Bangsamoro Parliament
- Jurisdiction: Bangsamoro, Philippines
- Meeting place: Bangsamoro Parliament Building, BARMM Complex, Rosary Heights VII, Cotabato City
- Term: October 30, 2026 – June 30, 2031
- Members: 80
- Speaker: Amer Zaakaria Rakim
- Deputy speakers: Abrar Hataman; Tina Matolo; Tawakal Midtimbang; Amil Bahar Mawallil; Ibrahim Ibay; Hosni Macapodi; Lampa Pandi; Amir Balindong; Suwaib Oranon; Jose Lorena
- Floor leader: Johari Abu

Sessions
- 1st: October 30, 2026 – present

The 1st Bangsamoro Parliament is the inaugural regular Bangsamoro Parliament, the legislature of the regional government of Bangsamoro. Its members were elected in the September 14, 2026, election. It was preceded by the first and second interim parliaments of the Bangsamoro Transition Authority (BTA), which served from 2019 to 2026.

As no party won the 41 seats required for a majority, the election resulted in a hung parliament. The Bangsamoro Federalist Party (BFP) and the United Bangsamoro Justice Party (UBJP) emerged as the main parties. The BFP claimed that it had secured enough support to elect its preferred chief minister. However, the BARMM Grand Coalition clarified that it had yet to enter into a coalition agreement with any party.

The elected members took their oaths on October 3, 2026, ahead of their scheduled assumption of office on October 30. Incumbent interim Chief Minister Abdulraof Macacua was elected the region's first regular chief minister.

== Leadership ==
Speaker

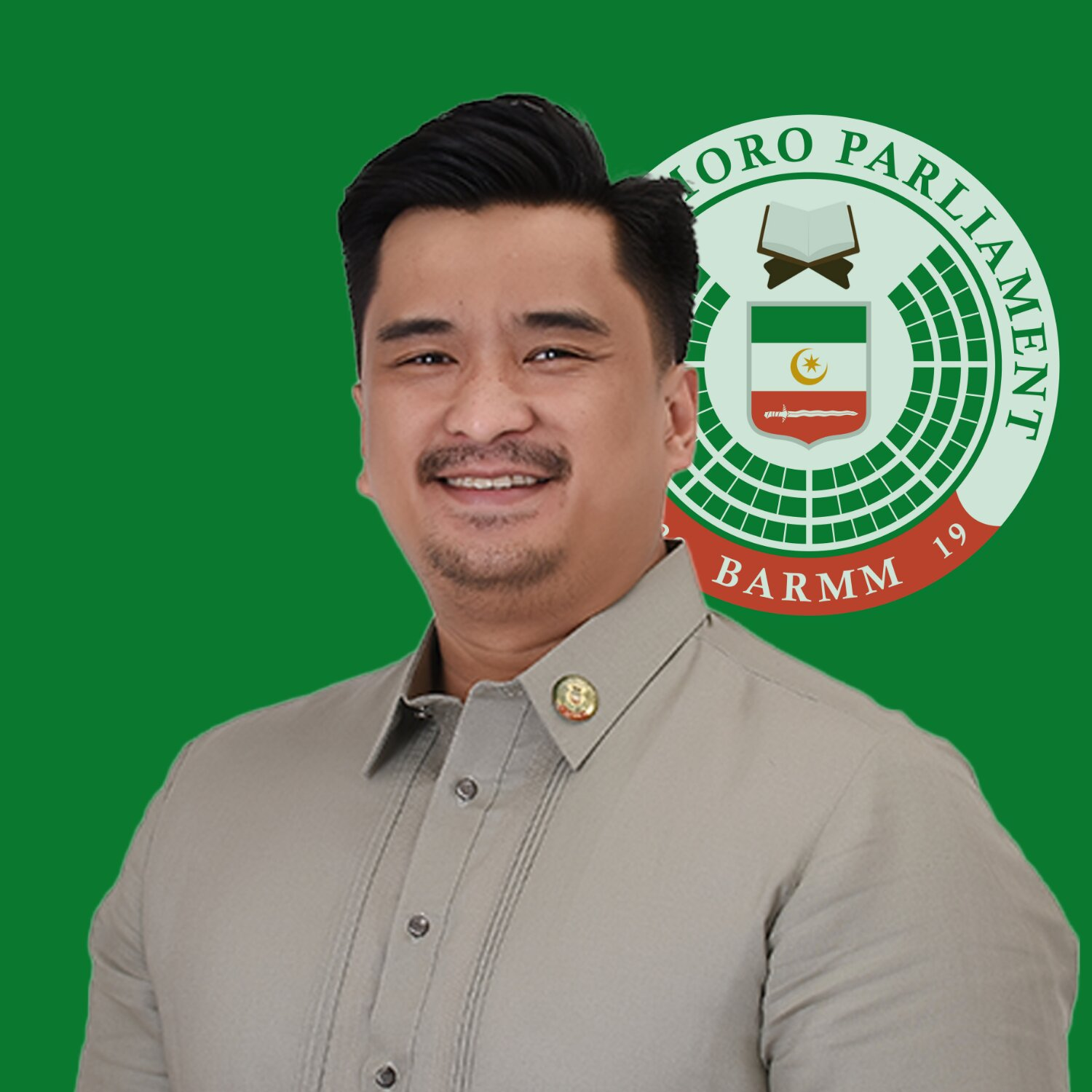
Amer Zaakaria Rakim

- Speaker: Amer Zaakaria Rakim (Proportional, BGC)
- Deputy Speakers:
  - Abrar Hataman (Basilan–3rd, BFP)
  - Tina Matolo (Tawi-Tawi–3rd, BFP)
  - Tawakal Midtimbang (Maguindanao del Sur–1st, UBJP)
  - Amil Bahar Mawallil (Proportional, BGC)
  - Ibrahim Ibay (Maguindanao del Norte–2nd, BFP)
  - Hosni Macapodi (Lanao del Sur–6th, SIAP)
  - Lampa Pandi (Lanao del Sur–4th, UBJP)
  - Amir Balindong (Proportional, UBJP)
  - Suwaib Oranon (Proportional, BFP)
  - Jose Lorena (Proportional, Raayat)
- Majority Floor Leader: Johari Abu (Proportional, BFP)
- Deputy Majority Floor Leaders:
  - Abdel Razi Amin (Proportional, BGC)
  - Naguib Sinarimbo (Cotabato City–2nd, BFP)
  - Ishak Mastura (Maguindanao del Norte–5th, BFP)
  - Jay Hataman Silliman (Basilan–4th, BFP)
  - Julbert Que (Tawi-Tawi–1st, BFP)
  - Tomanda Antok (Cotabato City–3rd, BFP)
  - Alindatu Pagayao (Proportional, BFP)
  - Jaafar Apollo Mikhail Matalam (Proportional, BFP)

== Composition ==
Party/group	At start
Bangsamoro Federalist Party (Note: Includes the votes for Abdulraof Macacua, who ran in Maguindanao del Norte's 3rd district as an independent candidate.)	31
United Bangsamoro Justice Party	30 (Note: Includes six sectoral representative seats.)
BARMM Grand Coalition	8
Serbisyong Inklusibo–Alyansang Progresibo (Note: Member party of the BARMM Grand Coalition.)	6
Al Ittihad–UKB Party	1
Raayat Democratic Party	1
Progresibong Bangsamoro Party	1
Non-Moro Indigenous Peoples	2
Total	80

== List of MPs ==
Province/City	District	Member	Party or group	Bloc	Ministerial Portfolio
Basilan	1st	Rima Hassan	BFP	Majority	-
Basilan	2nd	Paisal Sali	UBJP	Minority	-
Basilan	3rd	Abrar Hataman	BFP	Majority	-
Basilan	4th	Jay Hataman Salliman	BFP	Majority	Health
Cotabato City	1st	Sheriff Abas	UBJP	Minority	-
Cotabato City	2nd	Naguib Sinarimbo	BFP	Majority	Basic, Higher and Technical Education
Cotabato City	3rd	Tomanda Antok	BFP	Majority	-
Lanao del Sur	1st	Pala Gandamra	SIAP	Majority	-
Lanao del Sur	2nd	Hamza Gauraki	UBJP	Majority	-
Lanao del Sur	3rd	Rauf Adiong	SIAP	Majority	-
Lanao del Sur	4th	Lampa Pandi	UBJP	Majority	-
Lanao del Sur	5th	Arimao Asum	SIAP	Majority	-
Lanao del Sur	6th	Hosni Macapodi	SIAP	Majority	-
Lanao del Sur	7th	Rayyan Mindalano	SIAP	Majority	-
Lanao del Sur	8th	Arrie Balindong	UBJP	Majority	-
Lanao del Sur	9th	Rashdi Adiong	SIAP	Majority	Human Settlement and Development
Maguindanao del Norte	1st	Prince Khalid Tomawis	BFP	Majority	-
Maguindanao del Norte	2nd	Ibrahim Ibay	BFP	Majority	-
Maguindanao del Norte	3rd	Abdulraof Macacua	BFP	Majority	-
Maguindanao del Norte	4th	Abdulnasser Abas	UBJP	Minority	-
Maguindanao del Norte	5th	Ishak Mastura	BFP	Majority	Agriculture, Fisheries and Agrarian Reform
Maguindanao del Sur	1st	Tawakal Midtimbang	UBJP	Majority	-
Maguindanao del Sur	2nd	Sajid Andre Ampatuan	BFP	Majority	-
Maguindanao del Sur	3rd	Ali Sangki	Al Ittihad–UKB	Minority	-
Maguindanao del Sur	4th	DJ Parok Mangudadatu	BFP	Majority	-
Maguindanao del Sur	5th	Rafsanjani Ali	BFP	Majority	-
Special Geographic Area	1st	Mansor Ebrahim	UBJP	Minority	-
Special Geographic Area	2nd	Elaysa Enalang	UBJP	Minority	-
Tawi-Tawi	1st	Julbert Que	BFP	Majority	-
Tawi-Tawi	2nd	Hadjimar Matba	PBP	Majority	-
Tawi-Tawi	3rd	Tina Matolo	BFP	Majority	-
Tawi-Tawi	4th	Nur-Mahadil Ahaja	BFP	Majority	-
Proportional representation		Suwaib Oranon	BFP	Majority	-
Proportional representation		Abdulwahid Halil	BFP	Majority	-
Proportional representation		Akmad Brahim	BFP	Majority	Environment and Natural Resources, and Energy
Proportional representation		Dan Asnawie	BFP	Majority	-
Proportional representation		Abunawas Maslamama	BFP	Majority	Senior Minister
Proportional representation		Johari Abu	BFP	Majority	-
Proportional representation		Camid Gandamra Jr.	BFP	Majority	-
Proportional representation		Karwin Hamjani	BFP	Majority	-
Proportional representation		Kitem Kadatuan Jr.	BFP	Majority	Labor and Employment
Proportional representation		Michael Midtimbang	BFP	Majority	-
Proportional representation		Suraija Reina Hataman	BFP	Majority	-
Proportional representation		Ma-arouph Candao	BFP	Majority	-
Proportional representation		Alindatu Pagayao	BFP	Majority	-
Proportional representation		Zulfikar-Ali Bayam	BFP	Majority	-
Proportional representation		Jaafar Apollo Mikhail Matalam	BFP	Majority	-
Proportional representation		Junalyn Sumlay	BFP	Majority	-
Proportional representation		Murad Ebrahim	UBJP	Minority	-
Proportional representation		Mohagher Iqbal	UBJP	Minority	-
Proportional representation		Ali Solaiman	UBJP	Minority	-
Proportional representation		Eduard Guerra	UBJP	Minority	-
Proportional representation		Ibrahim Ali	UBJP	Minority	-
Proportional representation		Said Salendab	UBJP	Minority	-
Proportional representation		Mohammad Yacob	UBJP	Minority	-
Proportional representation		Amir Balindong	UBJP	Minority	-
Proportional representation		John Anthony Lim	UBJP	Minority	-
Proportional representation		Haber Asarul	UBJP	Minority	-
Proportional representation		Sha Elijah Dumama-Alba	UBJP	Minority	-
Proportional representation		Nordjiana Dipatuan-Ducol	UBJP	Minority	-
Proportional representation		Raissa Jajurie	UBJP	Minority	-
Proportional representation		Said Shiek	UBJP	Minority	-
Proportional representation		Ali Salik	UBJP	Minority	-
Proportional representation		Mamintal Adiong III	BGC	Majority	-
Proportional representation		Amer Zaakaria Rakim	BGC	Majority	-
Proportional representation		Abdulrahman Mangudadatu	BGC	Majority	-
Proportional representation		Datu Bimbo Sinsuat	BGC	Majority	-
Proportional representation		Hanie Bud	BGC	Majority	Science and Technology
Proportional representation		Abdel Razi Amin	BGC	Majority	-
Proportional representation		Sittie Aisah Pansar	BGC	Majority	-
Proportional representation		Amil Bahar Mawallil	BGC	Majority	-
Proportional representation		Jose Lorena	Raayat	Majority	-
Settler communities		Yul Adelfo Olaya	UBJP	Minority	-
Settler communities		Mary Ann Arnado	UBJP	Minority	-
Traditional leaders		Marjanie Macasalong	UBJP	Minority	-
Ulama		Muhammad Nadzir Ebil	UBJP	Minority	-
Women		Aida Silongan	UBJP	Minority	-
Youth		Sulfry Abbas	UBJP	Minority	-
Non-Moro Indigenous Peoples		Leticio Datuwata	Lambiangan people	Majority	-
Non-Moro Indigenous Peoples		Jo Genna Jover	Teduray people	Majority	Indigenous People’s Affairs
