= Lanao del Sur's 1st district =

Lanao del Sur's 1st district may refer to:

- Lanao del Sur's 1st congressional district, one of two congressional districts in Lanao del Sur represented in the House of Representatives of the Philippines
- Lanao del Sur's 1st parliamentary district, one of nine parliamentary districts in Lanao del Sur represented in the Bangsamoro Parliament
