= Cotabato City's 2nd parliamentary district =

Parliamentary district for the Bangsamoro Parliament

- Constituency for the Bangsamoro Parliament
- Boundary of Cotabato City's 2nd parliamentary district in Cotabato City
- City: Cotabato City
- Population: 154,883 (2024)
- Electorate: 53,560 (2026)

Current constituency
- Member of Parliament: Naguib Sinarimbo (elect)
- Political party: BFP

Cotabato City's 2nd parliamentary district is the second of the three parliamentary districts of the city of Cotabato for the Bangsamoro Parliament. It is composed of the barangays of Bagua Mother, Bagua I, Bagua II, Bagua III, Kalanganan Mother, Kalanganan I, Kalanganan II, Poblacion V, Poblacion VI, Rosary Heights X, Rosary Heights XI, Rosary Heights XII, and Rosary Heights XIII.

Naguib Sinarimbo of the Bangsamoro Federalist Party is the member of Parliament-elect for the district following the inaugural 2026 Bangsamoro Parliament election. He will assume office on October 30, 2026.

== List of MPs representing the district ==
No.	Portrait	Member (Lifespan)	Term of office	Party	Parliament	Electoral history	Constituencies
1		Naguib Sinarimbo (born 1972)	Assuming office on October 30, 2026	BFP	1st Parliament	Elected in 2026.	2026–present Bagua Mother, Bagua I, Bagua II, Bagua III, Kalanganan Mother, Kalanganan I, Kalanganan II, Poblacion V, Poblacion VI, Rosary Heights X, Rosary Heights XI, Rosary Heights XII, Rosary Heights XIII

== Election results ==
=== 2026 ===
2026 Bangsamoro Parliament election in Cotabato City
Party	Candidate	Votes	%
BFP	Naguib Sinarimbo	31,114	77.91
UBJP	Teng Midtimbang	8,411	21.06
BaPa	Dick Datumanong	246	0.62
Independent	Enggay Chua	167	0.42
Total votes		39,938	100.00
BFP win (new seat)			
