= Maguindanao del Norte's 1st parliamentary district =

Parliamentary district for the Bangsamoro Parliament

- Constituency for the Bangsamoro Parliament
- Boundary of Maguindanao del Norte's 1st parliamentary district in Maguindanao del Norte
- Province: Maguindanao del Norte
- Population: 130,123 (2024)
- Electorate: 66,326 (2026)

Current constituency
- Member of Parliament: Prince Khalid Tomawis (elect)
- Political party: BFP

Maguindanao del Norte's 1st parliamentary district is the first of the five parliamentary districts of the province of Maguindanao del Norte for the Bangsamoro Parliament. It is composed of the municipalities of Barira, Buldon, and Matanog.

Prince Khalid Tomawis of the Bangsamoro Federalist Party is the member of Parliament-elect for the district following the inaugural 2026 Bangsamoro Parliament election. He will assume office on October 30, 2026.

== List of MPs representing the district ==
No.	Portrait	Member (Lifespan)	Term of office	Party	Parliament	Electoral history	Constituencies
1		Prince Khalid Tomawis (born 1997)	Assuming office on October 30, 2026	BFP	1st Parliament	Elected in 2026.	2026–present Barira, Buldon, Matanog

== Election results ==
=== 2026 ===
2026 Bangsamoro Parliament election in Maguindanao del Norte
Party	Candidate	Votes	%
BFP	Prince Khalid Tomawis	41,137	69.93
UBJP	Jimmy Balitok	17,691	30.07
Total votes		58,828	100.00
BFP win (new seat)			
