= Women sector in the Bangsamoro Parliament =

Parliamentary district for the Bangsamoro Parliament

Women
- Sectoral representation for the Bangsamoro Parliament
- Represents: Women

Current Sectoral representation
- Created: 2026
- Seats: 1
- Group: UBJP
- Members: Aida Silongan (taking office on October 30, 2026)

The Women sector is a constituency in the Bangsamoro Parliament. The Parliament reserves a single seat for women in the Bangsamoro.

== Background ==
The Bangsamoro Parliament, as provided for by the Bangsamoro Electoral Code of 2023, is mandated to reserve eight seats for sectoral representatives. These include the Non-Moro Indigenous Peoples (NMIP), Settler Communities, Traditional Leaders, Youth, 'Ulama, and Women.

All six sectors were supposed to select their representatives through their respective sectoral assemblies. However, Bangsamoro Act No. 88 was passed, amending the Bangsamoro Electoral Code and providing that all sectors except the NMIP shall elect their representatives through a direct plurality of valid votes. Voters, regardless of gender, are eligible to vote for the representative of the Women sector.

== List of Women sector MPs ==
Portrait	Member (Lifespan)	Term of office	Organization	Parliament	Electoral history
	Aida Silongan	October 30, 2026	UBJP*	1st Parliament	Elected in 2026

- (*) sectoral wing of a regional political party.

== Elections ==
=== 2026 ===
2026 Bangsamoro Parliament election for the Women sectoral representation
Party	Candidate	Votes	%
UBJP	Aida Silongan	727,554	44.44
BGC	Ruby Sahali	515,270	30.41
BFP	Jehan Usop	313,012	18.48
TPWC	Dayangcarlsum Jumaide	106,142	3.56
BaPa	Pombaen Kader	22,919	1.35
LBIAA	Mariam Kadatuan	9,249	0.55
Total votes		1,694,146	100.00
UBJP win (new seat)			
Source: Commission on Elections, Philippine News Agency
