= Cotabato City's 3rd parliamentary district =

Parliamentary district for the Bangsamoro Parliament

- Constituency for the Bangsamoro Parliament
- Boundary of Cotabato City's 3rd parliamentary district in Cotabato City
- City: Cotabato City
- Population: 101,178 (2024)
- Electorate: 33,246 (2026)

Current constituency
- Member of Parliament: Tomanda Antok (elect)
- Political party: BFP

Cotabato City's 3rd parliamentary district is the third of the three parliamentary districts of the city of Cotabato for the Bangsamoro Parliament. It is composed of the barangays of Poblacion Mother, Poblacion II, Poblacion III, Poblacion IX, Rosary Heights VIII, Tamontaka Mother, Tamontaka I, Tamontaka II, Tamontaka III, Tamontaka IV, and Tamontaka V.

Tomanda Antok of the Bangsamoro Federalist Party is the member of Parliament-elect for the district following the inaugural 2026 Bangsamoro Parliament election. He will assume office on October 30, 2026.

== List of MPs representing the district ==
No.	Portrait	Member (Lifespan)	Term of office	Party	Parliament	Electoral history	Constituencies
1		Tomanda Antok (born 1963)	Assuming office on October 30, 2026	BFP	1st Parliament	Elected in 2026.	2026–present Poblacion Mother, Poblacion II, Poblacion III, Poblacion IX, Rosary Heights VIII, Tamontaka Mother, Tamontaka I, Tamontaka II, Tamontaka III, Tamontaka IV, Tamontaka V

== Election results ==
=== 2026 ===
2026 Bangsamoro Parliament election in Cotabato City
Party	Candidate	Votes	%
BFP	Tomanda Antok	9,223	49.92
UBJP	Hashim Manticayan	8,970	48.55
BEST Party	Reynaldo Canen	283	1.53
Total votes		18,476	100.00
BFP win (new seat)			
