= Tawi-Tawi's 3rd parliamentary district =

Parliamentary district for the Bangsamoro Parliament

- Constituency for the Bangsamoro Parliament
- Boundary of Tawi-Tawi's 3rd parliamentary district in Tawi-Tawi
- Province: Tawi-Tawi
- Population: 107,447 (2024)
- Electorate: 55,759 (2026)

Current constituency
- Member of Parliament: Tina Matolo (elect)
- Political party: BFP

Tawi-Tawi's 3rd parliamentary district is the third of the four parliamentary districts of the province of Tawi-Tawi for the Bangsamoro Parliament. It is composed of the municipalities of Sapa-Sapa, Simunul, and Tandubas.

Tina Matolo of the Bangsamoro Federalist Party is the member of Parliament-elect for the district following the inaugural 2026 Bangsamoro Parliament election. She will assume office on October 30, 2026.

== List of MPs representing the district ==
No.	Portrait	Member (Lifespan)	Term of office	Party	Parliament	Electoral history	Constituencies
1		Tina Matolo (born 1986)	Assuming office on October 30, 2026	BFP	1st Parliament	Elected in 2026.	2026–present Sapa-Sapa, Simunul, Tandubas

== Election results ==
=== 2026 ===
2026 Bangsamoro Parliament election in Tawi-Tawi
Party	Candidate	Votes	%
BFP	Tina Matolo	31,418	71.01
BGC	Mali Albrinji	8,684	19.63
BaPa	Alnahada Dalagan	2,360	5.33
UBJP	Dayang Amilbangsa	1,783	4.03
Total votes		44,245	100.00
BFP win (new seat)			
