= Settler communities in the Bangsamoro Parliament =

Settler communities
- Sectoral representation for the Bangsamoro Parliament
- Represents: Settlers of Bangsamoro

Current Sectoral representation
- Created: 2026
- Seats: 2
- Members: Yul Adelfo Olaya; Mary Ann Arnado (taking office on October 30, 2026)
- Political party: UBJP

The settler communities sector is a constituency in the Bangsamoro Parliament. The parliament reserves two seats for the settler population of the Bangsamoro, who are distinguished from the Moro and Lumad peoples of the autonomous region.

== Background ==
The Bangsamoro Parliament as per the Bangsamoro Electoral Code of 2023 is mandated to reserve eight seats to be allocated for sectoral representatives. This includes the Non-Moro Indigenous Peoples (NMIP), women, youth, ‘Ulama, traditional leaders, and settler communities.

All six sectors were supposed to select their representatives through their respective sectoral assemblies. However, Bangsamoro Act No. 88 was passed amending the Bangsamoro Election Code which meant that all sectors except the NMIP shall elect their representatives through a direct plurality of valid votes. Voters who are not settlers are eligible to vote.

There are two reserved seats for the settler communities. Each accredited organization fielded two candidates in the inaugural 2026 Bangsamoro Parliament election.

== List of Settler Communities MPs ==
Seat A					Seat B					Parliament
Portrait	Member (Lifespan)	Term of office	Organization	Electoral history	Portrait	Member (Lifespan)	Term of office	Organization	Electoral history	Parliament
	Yul Adelfo Olaya	October 30, 2026	UBJP (Note: Sectoral wing of a regional political party.)	Elected in 2026.		Mary Ann Arnado	October 30, 2026	UBJP	Elected in 2026.	1st Parliament

== Elections ==
=== 2026 ===
2026 Bangsamoro Parliament election for settler communities
Party	Candidate	Votes	%
UBJP	Yul Adelfo Olaya	752,919	25.25
UBJP	Mary Ann Arnado	692,771	23.23
BFP	Ongpin Yu Ekey	406,444	13.63
BFP	Susana Anayatin	397,839	13.34
BGC	Alex Abujen Jr.	348,428	11.68
BGC	Arnold Padayahag	270,278	9.06
C4P	Edgardo Ramirez	88,319	2.96
C4P	Percival Lagman	25,044	0.84
Total votes		2,018,478	100.00
UBJP win (new seat)			
Source: Commission on Elections, Philippine News Agency
