= Tawi-Tawi's 1st parliamentary district =

Parliamentary district for the Bangsamoro Parliament

- Constituency for the Bangsamoro Parliament
- Boundary of Tawi-Tawi's 1st parliamentary district in Tawi-Tawi
- Province: Tawi-Tawi
- Population: 131,887 (2024)
- Electorate: 71,260 (2026)

Current constituency
- Member of Parliament: Julbert Que (elect)
- Political party: BFP

Tawi-Tawi's 1st parliamentary district is the first of the four parliamentary districts of the province of Tawi-Tawi for the Bangsamoro Parliament. It is solely composed of the municipality of Bongao.

Julbert Que of the Bangsamoro Federalist Party is the member of Parliament-elect for the district following the inaugural 2026 Bangsamoro Parliament election. He will assume office on October 30, 2026.

== List of MPs representing the district ==
| No. | Portrait | Member (Lifespan) | Term of office | Party | Parliament | Electoral history | Constituencies |
|---|---|---|---|---|---|---|---|
| 1 | | Julbert Que (born 1987) | Assuming office on October 30, 2026 | BFP | 1st Parliament | Elected in 2026. | 2026–present Bongao |

== Election results ==
=== 2026 ===
2026 Bangsamoro Parliament election in Tawi-Tawi
| Party | Candidate | Votes | % |
|---|---|---|---|
| BFP | Julbert Que | 54,496 | 95.30 |
| UBJP | Indah Sabal | 2,687 | 4.70 |
| Total votes | | 57,183 | 100.00 |
| BFP win (new seat) | | | |
