= Tawi-Tawi's 4th parliamentary district =

Parliamentary district for the Bangsamoro Parliament

- Constituency for the Bangsamoro Parliament
- Boundary of Tawi-Tawi's 4th parliamentary district in Tawi-Tawi
- Province: Tawi-Tawi
- Population: 117,125 (2024)
- Electorate: 77,571 (2026)

Current constituency
- Member of Parliament: Nur-Mahadil Ahaja (elect)
- Political party: BFP

Tawi-Tawi's 4th parliamentary district is the fourth of the four parliamentary districts of the province of Tawi-Tawi for the Bangsamoro Parliament. It is composed of the municipalities of Mapun, Sibutu, Sitangkai, and Turtle Islands.

Nur-Mahadil Ahaja of the Bangsamoro Federalist Party is the member of Parliament-elect for the district following the inaugural 2026 Bangsamoro Parliament election. He will assume office on October 30, 2026.

== List of MPs representing the district ==
No.	Portrait	Member (Lifespan)	Term of office	Party	Parliament	Electoral history	Constituencies
1		Nur-Mahadil Ahaja (born 1975)	Assuming office on October 30, 2026	BFP	1st Parliament	Elected in 2026.	2026–present Mapun, Sibutu, Sitangkai, Turtle Islands

== Election results ==
=== 2026 ===
2026 Bangsamoro Parliament election in Tawi-Tawi
Party	Candidate	Votes	%
BFP	Nur-Mahadil Ahaja	19,174	36.20
Independent	Michail Ahaja	16,796	31.71
Independent	Sanya Jamalul	16,044	30.29
UBJP	Dhan Kasim	946	1.79
Total votes		52,960	100.00
BFP win (new seat)			
