= Basilan's 4th parliamentary district =

Parliamentary district for the Bangsamoro Parliament

- Constituency for the Bangsamoro Parliament
- Boundary of Basilan's 4th parliamentary district in Basilan
- Province: Basilan
- Population: 145,716 (2024)
- Electorate: 67,158 (2026)
- Major settlements: Hadji Muhtamad; Lantawan; Maluso

Current constituency
- Member of Parliament: Jay Hataman Salliman (elect)
- Political party: BFP

Basilan's 4th parliamentary district is the fourth of the four parliamentary districts of the province of Basilan for the Bangsamoro Parliament. It is composed of the municipalities of Hadji Muhtamad, Lantawan, and Maluso.

Jay Hataman Salliman of the Bangsamoro Federalist Party is the member of Parliament-elect for the district following the inaugural 2026 Bangsamoro Parliament election. He will assume office on October 30, 2026.

== Boundaries ==
The parliamentary districts of Bangsamoro was after the passage of Bangsamoro Act No. 58 into law. The bill was approved on February 28, 2024 by the Bangsamoro Parliament and was signed by Chief Minister Murad Ebrahim. The initial bill only called for three districts for the province of Basilan.

After the Supreme Court excluded Sulu from the Bangsamoro region in Septemeber 2024, the Bangsamoro Parliament was prompted to redistribute the seats allocated to Sulu. The configuration was promulgated via Bangsamoro Autonomy Act No. 77 and was signed by Chief Minister Abdulraof Macacua on August 28, 2025. created the Basilan fourth district.

=== Current (2025–present) ===
Bangsamoro Autonomy Act No. 77 created the Basilan fourth district. The constituency was not filled immediately as the first regular Bangsamoro Parliament election has been postponed.

However, both Acts No. 58 and 77 were declared unconstitutional by the Supreme Court which also ordered the parliament to make a new law anew. Macacua signed a new bill into law on January 20, 2026, becoming Bangsamoro Autonomy Act No. 86.

Act No. 86 defines the fourth district as comprising the same three municipalities mentioned in Act No. 77 which are:

- Hadji Muhtamad
- Lantawan
- Maluso

== List of MPs representing the district ==
No.	Portrait	Member (Lifespan)	Term of office	Party	Parliament	Electoral history	Constituencies
1		Jay Hataman Salliman (born 1997)	Assuming office on October 30, 2026	BFP	1st Parliament	Elected in 2026.	2026–present Hadji Muhtamad, Lantawan, Maluso

== Election results ==
=== 2026 ===
2026 Bangsamoro Parliament election in Basilan
Party	Candidate	Votes	%
BFP	Jay Hataman Salliman	41,675	81.51
BPP	Alzad Sattar	8,364	16.36
BaPa	Monar Ibno	562	1.10
UBJP	Omar Muallam	424	0.83
BEST Party	Pendatun Mohamad	101	0.20
Total votes		51,126	100.00
BFP win (new seat)			
