= Maguindanao del Sur's 3rd parliamentary district =

Parliamentary district for the Bangsamoro Parliament

- Constituency for the Bangsamoro Parliament
- Boundary of Maguindanao del Sur's 3rd parliamentary district in Maguindanao del Sur
- Province: Maguindanao del Sur
- Population: 132,625 (2024)
- Electorate: 78,920 (2026)

Current constituency
- Member of Parliament: Ali Sangki (elect)
- Political party: Al Ittihad–UKB

Maguindanao del Sur's 3rd parliamentary district is the third of the five parliamentary districts of the province of Maguindanao del Sur for the Bangsamoro Parliament. It is composed of the municipalities of Ampatuan, Datu Abdullah Sangki, Mamasapano, and Shariff Aguak.

Ali Sangki of the Al Ittihad–UKB Party is the member of Parliament-elect for the district following the inaugural 2026 Bangsamoro Parliament election. He will assume office on October 30, 2026.

== List of MPs representing the district ==
No.	Portrait	Member (Lifespan)	Term of office	Party	Parliament	Electoral history	Constituencies
1		Ali Sangki (born 1949)	Assuming office on October 30, 2026	Al Ittihad–UKB	1st Parliament	Elected in 2026.	2026–present Ampatuan, Datu Abdullah Sangki, Mamasapano, Shariff Aguak

== Election results ==
=== 2026 ===
2026 Bangsamoro Parliament election in Maguindanao del Sur
Party	Candidate	Votes	%
Al Ittihad–UKB	Ali Sangki	64,887	78.17
UBJP	Basco Camendan	11,432	13.77
BFP	Daud Upam	3,948	4.76
Independent	Tasmi Datumanong	1,896	2.28
BaPa	Datu Edo Upam	843	1.02
Total votes		83,006	100.00
Al Ittihad–UKB win (new seat)			
