= Basilan's 1st parliamentary district =

Parliamentary district for the Bangsamoro Parliament

- Constituency for the Bangsamoro Parliament
- Boundary of Basilan's 1st parliamentary district in Basilan
- Province: Basilan
- Population: 116,652 (2024)
- Electorate: 56,045 (2026)
- Major settlements: Lamitan

Current constituency
- Member of Parliament: Rima Hassan
- Political party: BFP

Basilan's 1st parliamentary district is the first of the four parliamentary districts of the province of Basilan for the Bangsamoro Parliament. It is solely composed of the city of Lamitan.

Rima Hassan of the Bangsamoro Federalist Party is the member of Parliament-elect for the district following the inaugural 2026 Bangsamoro Parliament election. She will assume office on October 30, 2026.

== Boundaries ==
=== 2024–2025 ===
The parliamentary districts of Bangsamoro was after the passage of Bangsamoro Act No. 58 into law. The bill was approved on February 28, 2024 by the Bangsamoro Parliament and was signed by Chief Minister Murad Ebrahim.

The initial boundaries of the Basilan's 1st parliamentary district is as follows: Akbar and Lamitan.

The constituency was not filled during this period as the first regular Bangsamoro Parliament election has been postponed.

=== Current (2025–present) ===
After the Supreme Court excluded Sulu from the Bangsamoro region in Septemeber 2024, the Bangsamoro Parliament was prompted to redistribute the seats allocated to Sulu. The configuration was promulgated via Bangsamoro Autonomy Act No. 77, signed by Chief Minister Abdulraof Macacua on August 28, 2025 reconfigured the Basilan first district. The Basilan 1st district was reduced to just the city of Lamitan.

Both Acts No. 58 and 77 were declared unconstitutional by the Supreme Court which also ordered the parliament to make a new law anew. Macacua signed a new bill into law on January 20, 2026, becoming Bangsamoro Autonomy Act No. 86.

Bangsamoro Autonomy Act No. 86, still defines the city of Lamitan as the sole local government unit under Basilan's 1st district.

== List of MPs representing the district ==
No.	Portrait	Member	Term of office		Legislature	Party	Electoral history	Constituent LGUs
No.	Portrait	Member	Start	End	Legislature	Party	Electoral history	Constituent LGUs
1		Rima Hassan (born 1962)	October 30, 2026	Incumbent	1st Parliament	BFP	Elected in 2026.	2026–present Lamitan

== Election results ==
=== 2026 ===
2026 Bangsamoro Parliament election in Basilan
Party	Candidate	Votes	%
BFP	Rima Hassan	21,933	52.38
BPP	Hegem Furigay	14,733	35.19
UBJP	Rajan Abdurahman	4,491	10.73
BaPa	Abubakar Cutal	714	1.71
Total votes		41,871	100.00
BFP win (new seat)			
