= Mapun =

Municipality in Tawi-Tawi, Philippines

Mapun مڤون Cagayan de Sulu/Tawi-Tawi
- Municipality
- Municipality of Mapun
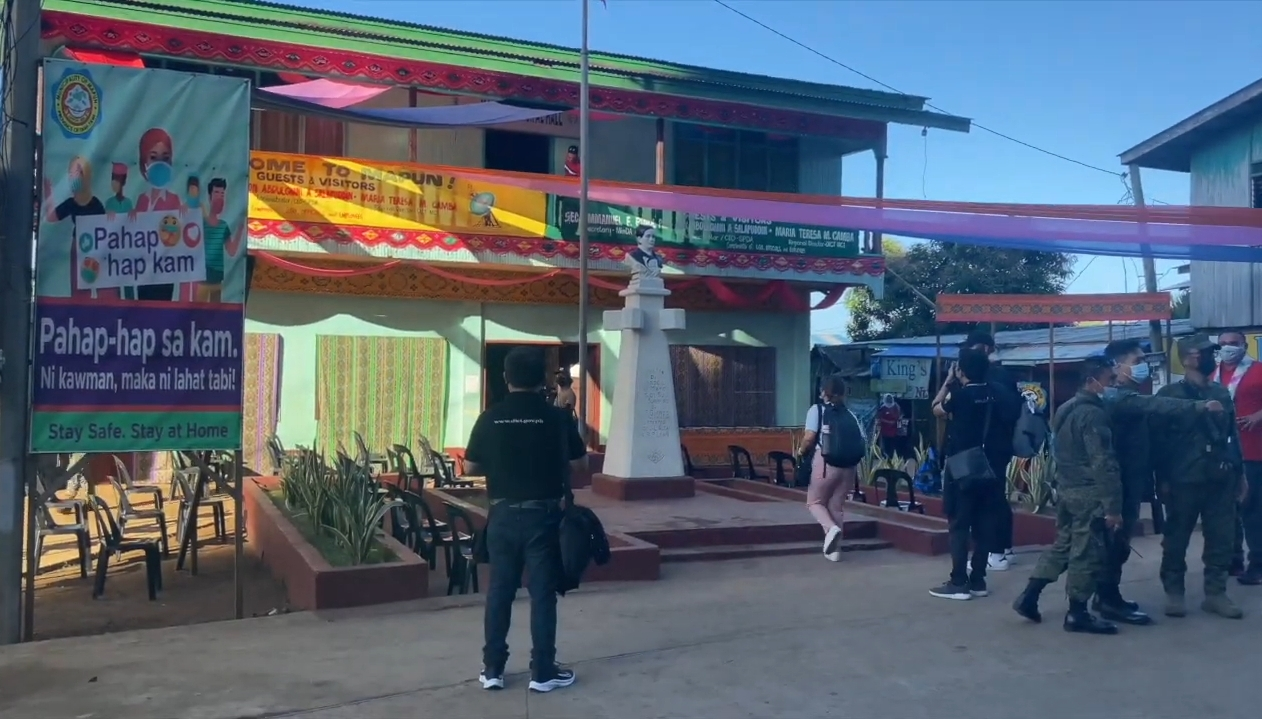
- Municipal Hall

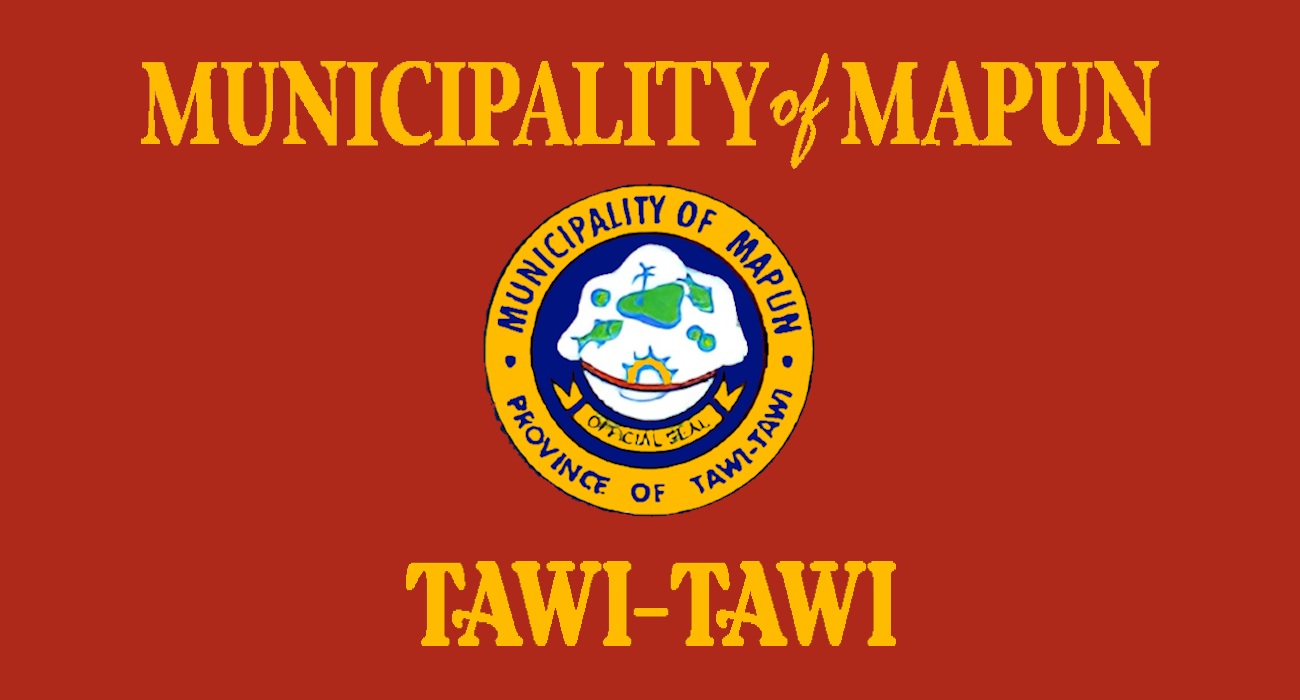
- Flag

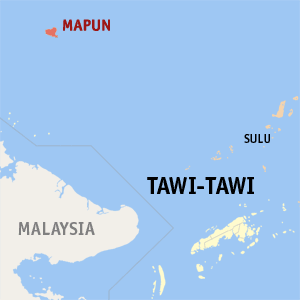
- Map of Tawi-Tawi with Mapun highlighted
- Interactive map of Mapun
- Location within the Philippines
- Coordinates: 6°58′30″N 118°30′50″E
- Country: Philippines
- Region: Bangsamoro Autonomous Region in Muslim Mindanao
- Province: Tawi-Tawi
- House district: Lone district
- Parliamentary district: 4th district
- Established: February 11, 1904 (as Cagayan de Sulu)
- Converted to municipality: July 1, 1958
- Renamed: March 7, 1984 (as Cagayan de Tawi-Tawi); September 5, 1988 (as Mapun)
- Barangays: 15 (see Barangays)

Government
  - Type: Sangguniang Bayan
  - Mayor: Suraida F. Muksin
  - Vice Mayor: Hamirin Ilani
  - House Representative: Dimszar M. Sali
  - Municipal Council: Members: Rambie T. Sadjiril; Omar Mockthar T. Abdulpatta; Sagrin D. Sakandal; Rasma T. Nur; Michael G. Pescadera; Charles T. Lao; Carl L. Canizares; Haripa H. Abdurahim
  - Electorate: 19,996 voters (2025)

Area
  - Total: 181.29 km^{2} (70.00 sq mi)
- Elevation: 6.7 m (22 ft)
- Highest elevation: 241 m (791 ft)
- Lowest elevation: 0 m (0 ft)

Population (2024 census)
  - Total: 29,218
  - Density: 161.17/km^{2} (417.42/sq mi)
  - Households: 4,928
- Demonym: Jama Mapun

Economy
  - Income class: 3rd municipal income class
  - Poverty incidence: 58.2% (2023)
  - Revenue: ₱ 164 million (2024)
  - Assets: ₱ 46.29 million (2024)
  - Expenditure: ₱ 163.2 million (2024)

Service provider
  - Electricity: Cagayan de Sulu Electric Cooperative (CASELCO)
- Time zone: UTC+8 (PST)
- ZIP code: 7508
- PSGC: 1907003000
- IDD : area code: +63 (0)68
- Native languages: Molbog; Sama; Sabah Malay; Tagalog; Tausug

Mapun, officially the Municipality of Mapun (Tagalog: Bayan ng Mapun), is a municipality in the province of Tawi-Tawi, Philippines. According to the 2024 census, it has a population of 29,218 people.

It was formerly known as Cagayan de Sulu until 1984, then as Cagayan de Tawi-Tawi until 1988.

Mapun is an island municipality in the Sulu Sea on the south-western extreme of the Philippines, located very close to Sabah, Malaysia as well as to Palawan. The people inhabiting the island are known as Jama Mapun or "people of Mapun". Their local language is Pullun Mapun, which means "Mapun language".

Due to an administrative error in the Treaty of Paris, while the remainder of the Philippines was ceded to the United States, Sibutu and Cagayan de Sulu were retained under Spanish Sovereignty until they were formally ceded to the United States upon the ratification of the Treaty of Washington on March 23, 1901. In 1946, the Philippines became an independent country, including Mapun island as part of it.

== History ==
=== Colonial period ===
Cagayan de Sulu was among the islands in the Sulu Archipelago being occupied by the Samal people (Sama-Bajau) in the late 18th and early 19th century. The island likewise had a smaller Tausug population than Palawan.

==== Sulu Sultanate at the growing external trade (Late 1700s–early 1800s) ====
In 1783, an East India Company ship, the Antelope, spent a month trading among Cagayan de Sulu and the Tapian Tana islands.

==== Internal trade ====
Cagayan de Sulu was among the traditional sources of rice and sago. In the 1790s, rice was extensively cultivated for export. The products once supplied the Tausugs in Sulu.

==== Challenges in the external trade and its aftermath ====
In 1872, as Spanish authorities began conquering Jolo, they issued a regulation aiming to destroy all Tausug shipping, in a move to reduce their trading activities to a mere submission. Despite this, a usual number of prahus (trading boats) from southern Palawan and Cagayan de Sulu continued to go to the British settlement.

Haji Mansur, a powerful aristocrat, was one of the leading traders bringing precious cargoes to Labuan. He was later attacked by the Spanish. He had returned to Labuan from a pilgrimage in Mecca in July 1875, and left for Cagayan de Sulu. While their prahus were on its way from southern Palawan to Zamboanga, they had an encounter with Spanish vessel Santa Lucia; after which, he was the only one at least (or amomg the few) in his family who survived.

The Tausugs in Sulu were affected by the blockade which severed their access to Cagayan de Sulu, resulting in their insufficient rice supply, despite reports that peace was later maintained in the Sulu Archipelago and people turned to labor and agriculture.

==== American colonial period ====
Following the 1898 Treaty of Paris, the first treaty between the United States and Spain, the former later adjusted the borders of the Philippine territory. Later, it was reportedly discovered that some islands were outside the defined boundary. The second treaty on November 7, 1900, included the outlying islands of Cagayan de Sulu and Sibutu and their dependencies, in the territory, situated in the southwest, both of the archipelago and of the Sulu Sea.

American documents stated that what was then called the Cagayan Sulu group was a dependency of the Sultan of Sulu and included the island of Cagayan Sulu, the two Muligi islands to the south, and seven others to the north. Cagayan Sulu, the largest, is bounded by a coral reef except at the steep northwest and southeast parts. There are ranges of hills on the east side. It was then only inhabited and thinly populated. While the soil and climate are favorable to vegetation and the cultivation of tobacco, hemp palm, and various crops, fruits, and vegetables; the natives depended mainly for the abundance of fishes and rice imported from Palawan, being exchanged with coconuts and its oil. Meanwhile, the smaller ones were for turtle catching and other temporary uses.

Throughout American-rule in the Philippines, Cagayan de Sulu was never organized as a regular municipality of the Moro Province's Sulu District despite having authorization by the legislative council, thus it once had its own tribal ward government. At the time, it had the villages of Jurata and Imus.

The first American resident governor of Cagayan de Sulu was Guy Stratton, a former American army officer from Kansas. He lived on the island for nearly two decades, during which he brought the three districts and allied villages under a single municipal authority. He later established an administrative center at the present-day poblacion, Lupa Pula, at a new anchorage. With a new municipal administrative structure, Datu Amilhanja was appointed mayor (1911–1914), directly under a resident deputy governor.

==== Japanese occupation ====
During the Japanese period, Salip Hatari of Awang was the de facto ruler (1943–1945) of the island with the help of the Japanese from Borneo, as part of revenge against Stratton, who had been subduing the salip in the early phase of the American pacification.

=== Contemporary ===
==== In the final decades as part of Sulu ====
By virtue of Executive Order No. 355, signed by President Carlos P. Garcia on August 26, 1959, Cagayan de Sulu was among the twenty of 21 remaining municipal districts of then-undivided Sulu which were converted into municipalities effective July 1, 1958. The first election was held in 1959 where Lim Eng, a part-Chinese commoner, won as mayor. First appointed in 1954, he served until 1967.

At that time, Cagayan de Sulu, being called Tana Mapun in the Pelun Mapun language, had been inhabited by Jama Mapun (literally, "People of Mapun") which are Muslim Filipinos like the Tausugs and Samals. It was in June 1963 when lunsay, their popular pre-Islamic traditional community dance, was documented following a performance in Barrio Duhul Batu.

==== As part of Tawi-Tawi and later developments ====
After the municipality became part of Tawi-Tawi, its name was further changed twice; from Cagayan de Sulu to Cagayan de Tawi-Tawi through Batas Pambansa Blg. 647 on March 7, 1984; and eventually to its present name, Mapun, through Republic Act No. 6672 on September 5, 1988.

Mapun Island, located near the Philippine–Malaysian border, is inside the Sandakan Basin which is said to be rich in oil and natural gas. On the Philippine side, there have been joint explorations since as early as 2004 off the island, resulting in the discovery of oil within a decade. The waters alone, reportedly, have an estimated reserve of about 500 billion barrels of oil.

Mapun, along with the Turtle Islands—both now among the three main island groups in the province—serve as places of interest for traders bound for northern Borneo, particularly Sabah, and Labuan.

== Geography ==
Mapun Tawi-Tawi is surrounded by several islets such as:

- Manda
- Boan
- Kinapusan
- Pamilikan
- Lapun-Lapun
- Bintuut
- Muligi

Most of these are located at Barangay Umus Mataha.

=== Barangays ===
Mapun is politically subdivided into 15 barangays. Each barangay consists of puroks while some have sitios.

- Boki
- Duhul Batu
- Guppah
- Iruk-Iruk
- Kompang
- Liyubud (Poblacion)
- Lubbak Parang
- Lupa Pula
- Mahalu
- Pawan
- Sapah
- Sikub
- Tabulian
- Tanduan
- Umus Mataha

=== Climate ===
Climate data for Mapun, Tawi-Tawi
Month	Jan	Feb	Mar	Apr	May	Jun	Jul	Aug	Sep	Oct	Nov	Dec	Year
Mean daily maximum °C (°F)	28 (82)	28 (82)	29 (84)	31 (88)	31 (88)	31 (88)	30 (86)	31 (88)	30 (86)	30 (86)	29 (84)	28 (82)	30 (85)
Mean daily minimum °C (°F)	24 (75)	23 (73)	23 (73)	24 (75)	24 (75)	25 (77)	24 (75)	25 (77)	24 (75)	24 (75)	24 (75)	24 (75)	24 (75)
Average precipitation mm (inches)	123 (4.8)	81 (3.2)	79 (3.1)	48 (1.9)	65 (2.6)	65 (2.6)	68 (2.7)	64 (2.5)	66 (2.6)	100 (3.9)	101 (4.0)	134 (5.3)	994 (39.2)
Average rainy days	17.7	14.5	16.1	14.9	22.7	24.3	25.7	25.4	23.8	25.7	22.9	20.8	254.5
Source: Meteoblue

== Demographics ==
Population census of Mapun
Year	Pop.	±% p.a.
1903	2,000	—
1918	6,090	+7.71%
1939	6,851	+0.56%
1948	8,824	+2.85%
1960	10,789	+1.69%
1970	12,577	+1.54%
1975	15,892	+4.80%
1980	19,607	+4.29%
1990	19,372	−0.12%
1995	20,716	+1.26%
2000	22,011	+1.31%
2007	29,801	+4.27%
2010	24,168	−7.34%
2015	26,597	+1.84%
2020	30,038	+2.59%
2024	29,218	−0.66%
Source: Philippine Statistics Authority

== Education ==
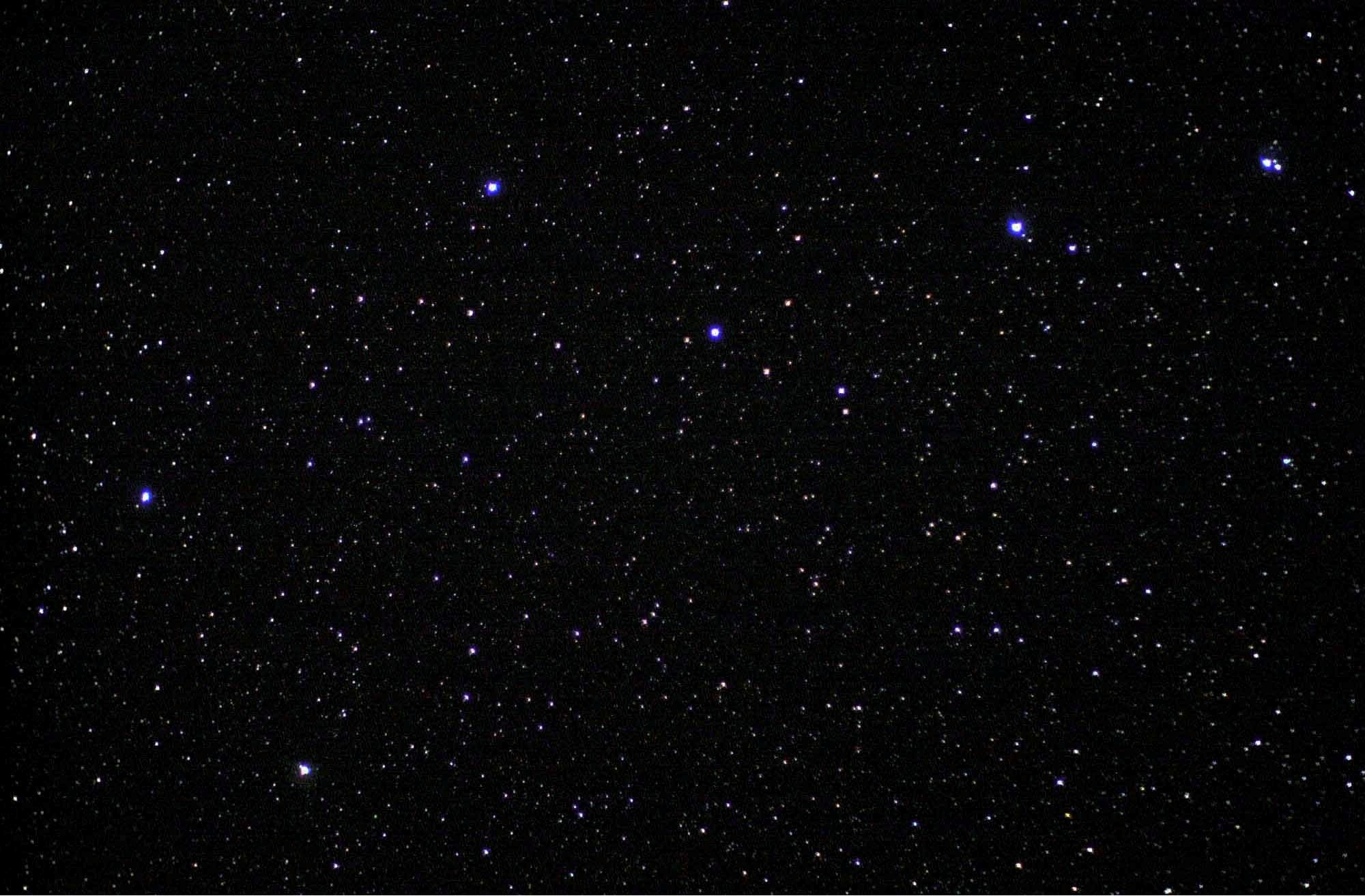
The Jama Mapun people's indigenous cosmology is extremely vast. Examples of figures in their cosmology are Niyu-niyu (coconut palm), Lumba-lumba (dolphin), and Anak Datu (two sons of a datu spearing another figure, Bunta - a blowfish).

Elementary

- Lupa Pula Pilot School (formerly Lupa Pula Central School) - elementary pupils are primarily from Lupa Pula, Liyubud, and Mahalu.
- Mahalu Elementary School
- Duhul Batu Elementary School
- Sikub Elementary School
- Surong Baiddin Memorial Elementary School
- Sapah Elementary School
- Boki Elementary School
- Kompang Elementary School
- Tanduan Elementary School
- Pawan Elementary School
- Guppah Elementary School
- Iruk-Iruk Elementary School
- Umus Mataha Elementary School
- Lubbak Parang Elementary School
- Imam Saat Elementary School

Secondary

- Notre Dame of Cagayan (NDC) - a private school located in the border of Barangay Lupa Pula and Barangay Mahalu.
- Mindanao State University (MSU) - a public school located in Mahalu
- Tawi-Tawi Academy (TTA) - a private school located in Barangay Guppah
- Mapun SHS

Tertiary

Mindanao State University Extension - a public school and the only college institution in Mapun. MSU-Extension offers two-year courses.

Majority of those who graduate from high school pursue their studies in other places, most notably Zamboanga City, Palawan, and Bongao. On the other hand, most of the graduates from elementary and high school are forced to stop their studies due to poverty lack of scholarships from the government. Most of them have found a job in neighboring country like Malaysia. Tend to work as a construction workers and fisherman.

== Culture ==
=== Mapun Day ===
Mapun Foundation Day is celebrated by the Jama Mapun every September 5. This week-long celebration starts on September 1, with a parade and then a short program held in Lupa Pula Central School.

Various competitions are held during Mapun Day, which includes singing competitions (in English, Tausug, and Pullun Mapun), dance showdowns (modern dance, folk dance, pangalay, which is a native dance, and lunsay, which is a dance performed during weddings), Azaan competition, Tarasul iban Daman (Mapun's version of declamation and oration), and Leleng, to name a few.

Each Barangay has their own representatives in the various events. However, the most popular is the "Budjang Mapun", which is a beauty contest. Each barangay has its own contestant in this event. The winner of the search for "Budjang Mapun" is usually sent to Bongao as Mapun's representative in Budjang Tawi-Tawi, a similar beauty search held in Bongao every Province Day. Every municipality in Tawi-Tawi has its own contestant.

== Economy ==
Poverty Incidence of Mapun

Source: Philippine Statistics Authority

Main source of income from this province are farming and fishing. In a bid to advance competitiveness of Tawi-Tawi in farming industry, this province supplies large companies when it comes on coconut plantation mainly "COPRA". 80% of the land consist of coconut trees, quarterly harvested and to be traded and refined in other places, like Palawan and Zamboanga City.

Rice fields are not known in this area due to lack of water irrigation projects, rice is imported locally from Palawan and Zamboanga City and mostly from Malaysia. Most of the locals use cassava as base on their daily meal.

== See also ==
- List of renamed cities and municipalities in the Philippines
