= Maguindanao del Norte's 2nd parliamentary district =

Parliamentary district for the Bangsamoro Parliament

- Constituency for the Bangsamoro Parliament
- Boundary of Maguindanao del Norte's 2nd parliamentary district in Maguindanao del Norte
- Province: Maguindanao del Norte
- Population: 123,309 (2024)
- Electorate: 60,656 (2026)

Current constituency
- Member of Parliament: Ibrahim Ibay (elect)
- Political party: BFP

Maguindanao del Norte's 2nd parliamentary district is the second of the five parliamentary districts of the province of Maguindanao del Norte for the Bangsamoro Parliament. It is solely composed of the municipality of Parang.

Ibrahim Ibay of the Bangsamoro Federalist Party is the member of Parliament-elect for the district following the inaugural 2026 Bangsamoro Parliament election. He will assume office on October 30, 2026.

== List of MPs representing the district ==
No.	Portrait	Member (Lifespan)	Term of office	Party	Parliament	Electoral history	Constituencies
1		Ibrahim Ibay (born 1967)	Assuming office on October 30, 2026	BFP	1st Parliament	Elected in 2026.	2026–present Parang

== Election results ==
=== 2026 ===
2026 Bangsamoro Parliament election in Maguindanao del Norte
Party	Candidate	Votes	%
BFP	Ibrahim Ibay	43,737	100.00
Total votes		43,737	100.00
BFP win (new seat)			
