= Ampatuan, Maguindanao del Sur =

Municipality in Maguindanao del Sur, Philippines

Ampatuan أمباتوان
- Municipality
- Municipality of Ampatuan
- Municipal Hall

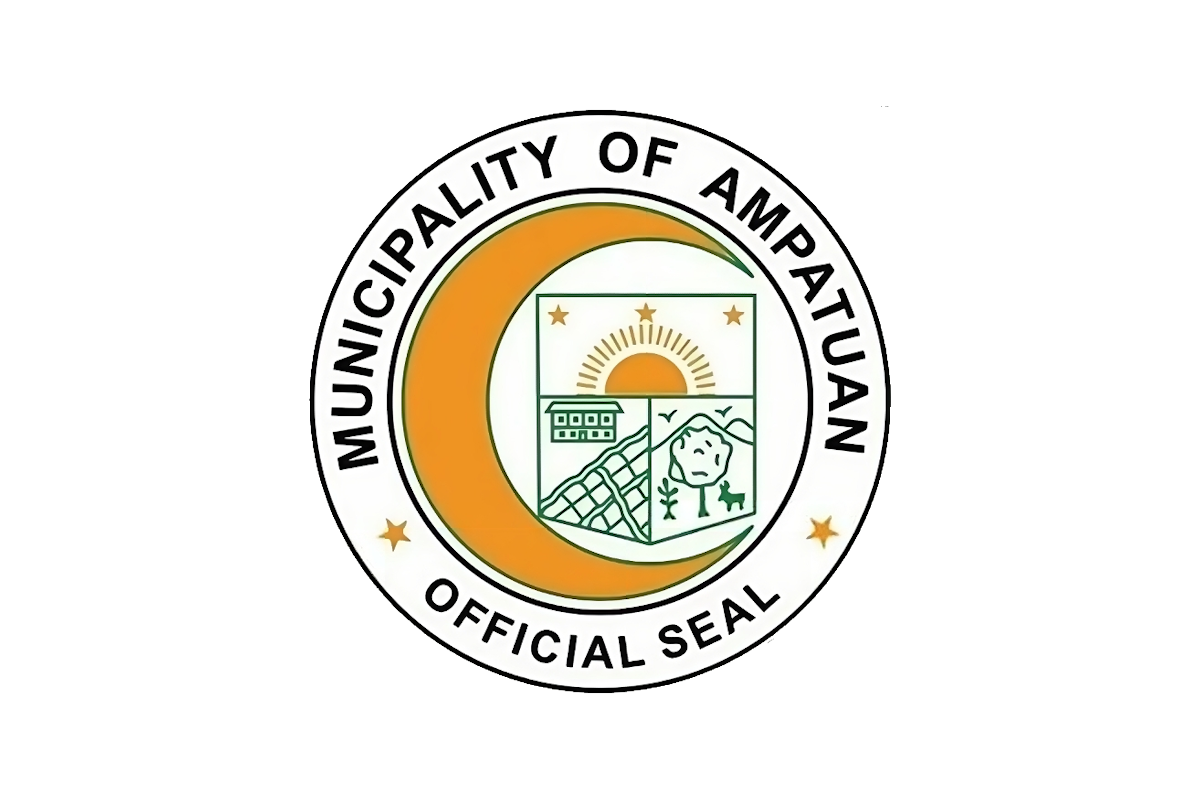
- Flag Seal

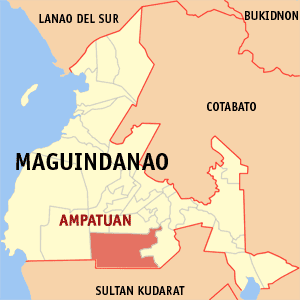
- Map of Maguindanao del Sur with Ampatuan highlighted
- Interactive map of Ampatuan
- Location within the Philippines
- Coordinates: 6°50′05″N 124°27′29″E
- Country: Philippines
- Region: Bangsamoro Autonomous Region in Muslim Mindanao
- Province: Maguindanao del Sur
- House district: Lone district
- Parliamentary district: 3rd district
- Founded: June 21, 1959
- Named for: Sarip Ampatuan
- Barangays: 11 (see Barangays)

Government
  - Type: Sangguniang Bayan
  - Mayor: Baileah G. Sangki
  - Vice Mayor: Bai Yasmin S. Sangki
  - House Representative: Mohamad P. Paglas Sr.
  - Municipal Council: Members: Samnon M. Sangki; Hanon A. Sangki; Bai Ramla B. Sangki; Datu Wata S. Adzis Jr.; Bainot A. Malang; Samaludin M. Sangki; Rommel C. Rodriguez; Luis S. Tagal
  - Electorate: 22,810 voters (2025)

Area
  - Total: 255.40 km^{2} (98.61 sq mi)
- Elevation: 53 m (174 ft)
- Highest elevation: 376 m (1,234 ft)
- Lowest elevation: 15 m (49 ft)

Population (2024 census)
  - Total: 31,560
  - Density: 123.6/km^{2} (320.0/sq mi)
  - Households: 4,820

Economy
  - Income class: 2nd municipal income class
  - Poverty incidence: 40.92% (2023)
  - Revenue: ₱ 176.4 million (2024)
  - Assets: ₱ 274 million (2024)
  - Expenditure: ₱ 163.9 million (2024)
  - Liabilities: ₱ 107.3 million (2024)

Service provider
  - Electricity: Maguindanao Electric Cooperative (MAGELCO)
- Time zone: UTC+8 (PST)
- ZIP code: 9609
- PSGC: 1903801000
- IDD : area code: +63 (0)64
- Native languages: Maguindanao; Tagalog
- Website: www.ampatuan.gov.ph

Ampatuan ([ampaˈtʊʔɐn]), officially the Municipality of Ampatuan (Maguindanaon: Inged nu Ampatuan; Iranun: Inged a Ampatuan; Tagalog: Bayan ng Ampatuan), is a municipality in the province of Maguindanao del Sur, Philippines. According to the 2024 census, it had a population of 31,560.

== History ==
Ampatuan was created out of 23 barrios of Datu Piang on 21 June 1959 by Republic Act No. 2509. On 22 November 1973, the municipality of Esperanza was carved out of its territory and was made part of the province of Sultan Kudarat, while Ampatuan itself was made part of Maguindanao, when the old Cotabato province was divided into three provinces on the same date. It further lost territory, when its electorate ratified on 3 January 2004, the separation of ten of its barangays to form the municipality of Datu Abdullah Sangki.

The town was the site of the Maguindanao Massacre on 23 November 2009. The victims were about to file a certificate of candidacy for Esmael Mangudadatu, vice mayor of Buluan town for the province's gubernatorial election. Mangudadatu was challenging Andal Ampatuan Jr. (son of the incumbent Maguindanao governor Datu Andal Ampatuan Sr., the mayor of Datu Unsay, and accused of leading the massacre) in the election.

== Geography ==
=== Barangays ===
Ampatuan is politically subdivided into 11 barangays. Each barangay consists of puroks while some have sitios.

- Dicalongan (Poblacion)
- Kakal
- Kamasi
- Kapinpilan
- Kauran
- Malatimon
- Matagabong
- Saniag
- Tomicor
- Tubak
- Salman

=== Climate ===
Climate data for Ampatuan, Maguindanao del Sur
Month	Jan	Feb	Mar	Apr	May	Jun	Jul	Aug	Sep	Oct	Nov	Dec	Year
Mean daily maximum °C (°F)	32 (90)	32 (90)	33 (91)	33 (91)	32 (90)	31 (88)	30 (86)	31 (88)	31 (88)	31 (88)	31 (88)	31 (88)	32 (89)
Mean daily minimum °C (°F)	21 (70)	21 (70)	21 (70)	22 (72)	23 (73)	23 (73)	23 (73)	23 (73)	23 (73)	23 (73)	23 (73)	22 (72)	22 (72)
Average precipitation mm (inches)	19 (0.7)	14 (0.6)	15 (0.6)	18 (0.7)	33 (1.3)	42 (1.7)	44 (1.7)	42 (1.7)	30 (1.2)	31 (1.2)	28 (1.1)	17 (0.7)	333 (13.2)
Average rainy days	6.9	5.6	6.9	8.1	15.1	17.5	17.8	18.5	14.9	14.9	12.4	8.0	146.6
Source: Meteoblue (modeled/calculated data, not measured locally)

== Demographics ==
Population census of Ampatuan
Year	Pop.	±% p.a.
1960	21,214	—
1970	33,867	+4.78%
1975	25,778	−5.33%
1980	27,362	+1.20%
1990	25,542	−0.69%
1995	27,200	+1.19%
2000	32,907	+4.17%
2007	33,702	+0.33%
2010	17,800	−20.73%
2015	24,801	+6.52%
2020	28,941	+3.30%
2024	31,560	+2.10%
Source: Philippine Statistics Authority

== Economy ==
Poverty Incidence of Ampatuan

Source: Philippine Statistics Authority
