= Maguindanao del Norte's 4th parliamentary district =

Parliamentary district for the Bangsamoro Parliament

- Constituency for the Bangsamoro Parliament
- Boundary of Maguindanao del Norte's 4th parliamentary district in Maguindanao del Norte
- Province: Maguindanao del Norte
- Population: 250,358 (2024)
- Electorate: 152,030 (2026)

Current constituency
- Member of Parliament: Abdulnasser Abas (elect)
- Political party: UBJP

Maguindanao del Norte's 4th parliamentary district is the fourth of the five parliamentary districts of the province of Maguindanao del Norte for the Bangsamoro Parliament. It is composed of the municipalities of Datu Blah T. Sinsuat, Datu Odin Sinsuat, and Upi.

Abdulnasser Abas of the United Bangsamoro Justice Party is the member of Parliament-elect for the district following the inaugural 2026 Bangsamoro Parliament election. He will assume office on October 30, 2026.

== List of MPs representing the district ==
No.	Portrait	Member (Lifespan)	Term of office	Party	Parliament	Electoral history	Constituencies
1		Abdulnasser Abas (born 1956)	Assuming office on October 30, 2026	UBJP	1st Parliament	Elected in 2026.	2026–present Datu Blah T. Sinsuat, Datu Odin Sinsuat, Upi

== Election results ==
=== 2026 ===
2026 Bangsamoro Parliament election in Maguindanao del Norte
Party	Candidate	Votes	%
UBJP	Abdulnasser Abas	49,965	57.09
BaPa	Bai Sandra Sema	35,603	40.68
BEST Party	Alexander Agustin	1,578	1.80
Independent	Jashriya Dilangalen	367	0.42
Total votes		87,513	100.00
UBJP win (new seat)			
