= Saluag Island =

Island in the Philippines

Coordinates: 4°35′25″N 119°28′09″E

Saluag Island is located in the Province of Tawi-Tawi, in the Bangsamoro Autonomous Region in Muslim Mindanao, Philippines.

Its length is 1.6 kilometres. The island belongs administratively to the municipality of Sibutu and is the southernmost island of the Philippines.
