= Sapa-Sapa =

Municipality in Tawi-Tawi, Philippines

Sapa-Sapa ساڤ-ساڤ
- Municipality
- Municipality of Sapa-Sapa
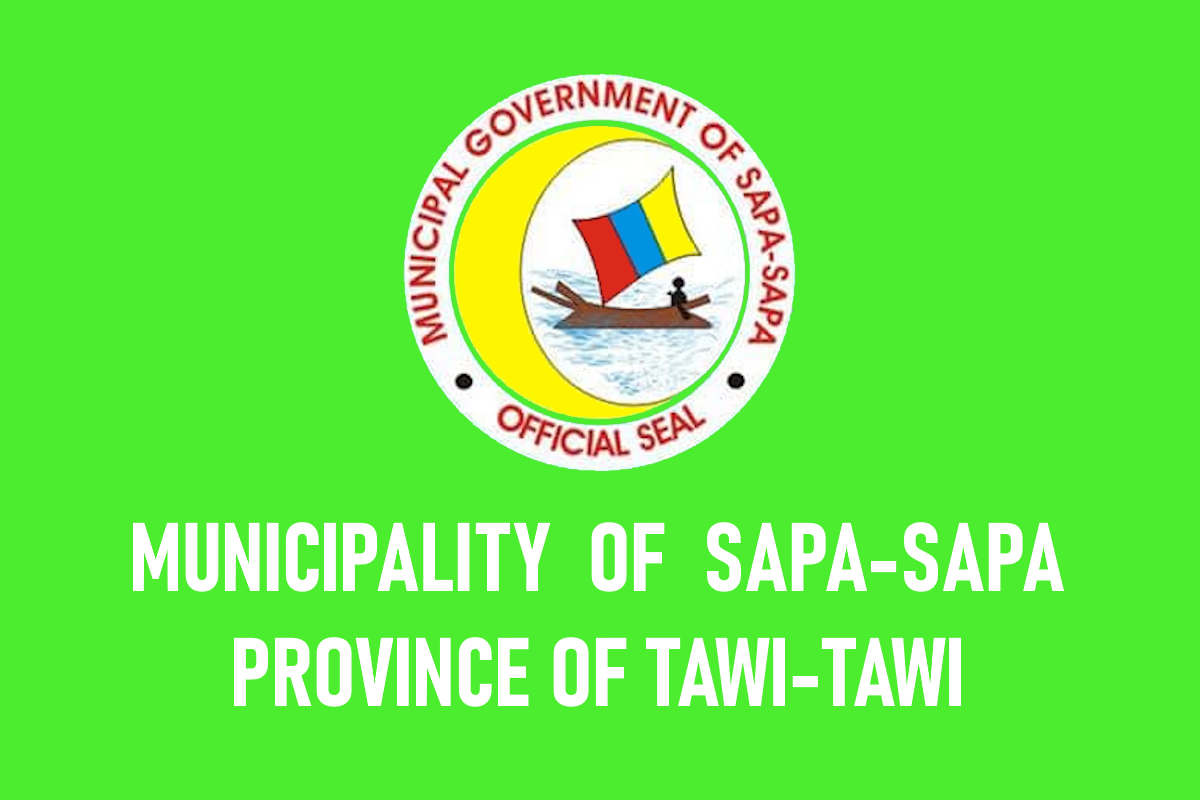
- Flag

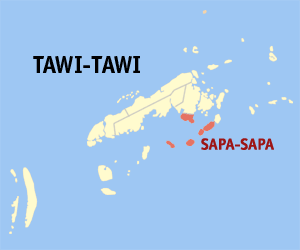
- Map of Tawi-Tawi with Sapa-Sapa highlighted
- Interactive map of Sapa-Sapa
- Location within the Philippines
- Coordinates: 5°05′24″N 120°16′22″E
- Country: Philippines
- Region: Bangsamoro Autonomous Region in Muslim Mindanao
- Province: Tawi-Tawi
- House district: Lone district
- Parliamentary district: 3rd district
- Barangays: 23 (see Barangays)

Government
  - Type: Sangguniang Bayan
  - Mayor: Rhodesia M. Sali
  - Vice Mayor: Karim Darwis J. Masdal
  - House Representative: Dimszar M. Sali
  - Municipal Council: Members: Jovelyn T. Marjan; Putli Aisa S. Matolo; Dhenmar A. Kipli; Mohmmad Toy I. Sulayman; Alona F. Maulana; Amilbangsa A. Masdal; Reymal S. Shalim; Sadat S. Shalim
  - Electorate: 22,022 voters (2025)

Area
  - Total: 235.61 km^{2} (90.97 sq mi)
- Elevation: 5.0 m (16.4 ft)
- Highest elevation: 529 m (1,736 ft)
- Lowest elevation: 0 m (0 ft)

Population (2024 census)
  - Total: 37,129
  - Density: 157.59/km^{2} (408.15/sq mi)
  - Households: 5,548

Economy
  - Income class: 2nd municipal income class
  - Poverty incidence: 53.49% (2023)
  - Revenue: ₱ 186.3 million (2024)
  - Assets: ₱ 157 million (2024)
  - Expenditure: ₱ 94.74 million (2024)
  - Liabilities: ₱ 1.297 million (2024)

Service provider
  - Electricity: Tawi Tawi Electric Cooperative (TAWELCO)
- Time zone: UTC+8 (PST)
- ZIP code: 7503
- PSGC: 1907010000
- IDD : area code: +63 (0)68
- Native languages: Sama; Tagalog
- Website: www.sapasapa.gov.ph

Sapa-Sapa, officially the Municipality of Sapa-Sapa (Tagalog: Bayan ng Sapa-Sapa), is a municipality in the province of Tawi-Tawi, Philippines. According to the 2024 census, it has a population of 37,129 people.

== Geography ==
=== Barangays ===
Sapa-sapa is politically subdivided into 23 barangays. Each barangay consists of puroks while some have sitios.

- Baldatal - M
- Butun
- Dalo-Dalo
- Kohek
- Lakit-Lakit
- Latuan (Sunsang)
- Banaran Lookan
- Look Natoh
- Lookan Latuan
- Malanta
- Tambunan
- Sikubong
- Palatih Gadjaminah
- Pamasan
- Sapaat
- Sapa-Sapa (Poblacion)
- Sokah-sokah
- Bukut Sikubong
- Tangngah Deom Sikubong
- Tapian Bohe North
- Tapian Bohe South
- Banaran Tunggusong
- Mantabuan Sannang Hati
- Lookan Tup-Tup
- NOTE: "M" marks the Barangays located on the mainland, despite being separated by a creek.

=== Panampangan Island ===
Panampangan Island is located in the municipality of Sapa-sapa. The island itself is famous for its sandbar which is considered the longest in the Philippines.

At low tide, the sandbar connects to the nearby islet of Panampangan island.

=== Climate ===
Climate data for Sapa-Sapa, Tawi-Tawi
Month	Jan	Feb	Mar	Apr	May	Jun	Jul	Aug	Sep	Oct	Nov	Dec	Year
Mean daily maximum °C (°F)	29 (84)	29 (84)	29 (84)	30 (86)	30 (86)	30 (86)	29 (84)	30 (86)	30 (86)	30 (86)	29 (84)	29 (84)	30 (85)
Mean daily minimum °C (°F)	25 (77)	24 (75)	24 (75)	25 (77)	25 (77)	25 (77)	25 (77)	25 (77)	25 (77)	25 (77)	25 (77)	25 (77)	25 (77)
Average precipitation mm (inches)	157 (6.2)	115 (4.5)	123 (4.8)	96 (3.8)	136 (5.4)	120 (4.7)	104 (4.1)	89 (3.5)	86 (3.4)	131 (5.2)	151 (5.9)	159 (6.3)	1,467 (57.8)
Average rainy days	20.4	17.5	20.4	21.1	26.7	25.7	26.0	24.5	24.0	27.7	26.3	24.7	285
Source: Meteoblue

== Demographics ==
Population census of Sapa-Sapa
Year	Pop.	±% p.a.
1980	14,946	—
1990	16,173	+0.79%
1995	17,728	+1.73%
2000	26,242	+8.77%
2007	37,135	+4.91%
2010	28,781	−8.86%
2015	30,917	+1.37%
2020	33,580	+1.75%
2024	37,129	+2.44%
Source: Philippine Statistics Authority

== Economy ==
Poverty Incidence of Sapa-Sapa

Source: Philippine Statistics Authority
