= Cotabato City's 1st parliamentary district =

Parliamentary district for the Bangsamoro Parliament

- Constituency for the Bangsamoro Parliament
- Boundary of Cotabato City's 1st parliamentary district in Cotabato City
- City: Cotabato City
- Population: 103,883 (2024)
- Electorate: 44,322 (2026)

Current constituency
- Member of Parliament: Sheriff Abas (elect)
- Political party: UBJP

Cotabato City's 1st parliamentary district is the first of the three parliamentary districts of the city of Cotabato for the Bangsamoro Parliament. It is composed of the barangays of Poblacion IV, Poblacion VIII, Rosary Heights Mother, Rosary Heights I, Rosary Heights II, Rosary Heights III, Rosary Heights IV, Rosary Heights V, Rosary Heights VI, Rosary Heights VII, and Rosary Heights IX.

Sheriff Abas of the United Bangsamoro Justice Party is the member of Parliament-elect for the district following the inaugural 2026 Bangsamoro Parliament election. He will assume office on October 30, 2026.

== List of MPs representing the district ==
No.	Portrait	Member (Lifespan)	Term of office	Party	Parliament	Electoral history	Constituencies
1		Sheriff Abas (born 1979)	Assuming office on October 30, 2026	UBJP	1st Parliament	Elected in 2026.	2026–present Poblacion IV, Poblacion VIII, Rosary Heights Mother, Rosary Heights I, Rosary Heights II, Rosary Heights III, Rosary Heights IV, Rosary Heights V, Rosary Heights VI, Rosary Heights VII, Rosary Heights IX

== Election results ==
=== 2026 ===
2026 Bangsamoro Parliament election in Cotabato City
Party	Candidate	Votes	%
UBJP	Sheriff Abas	12,334	57.75
Mahardika	Romeo Sema	8,676	40.63
BEST Party	Danilo Liggayo	346	1.62
Total votes		21,356	100.00
UBJP win (new seat)			
