= Sibutu Islands =

Group of islands in the Philippines

Native name: Kapuluan ng Sibutu
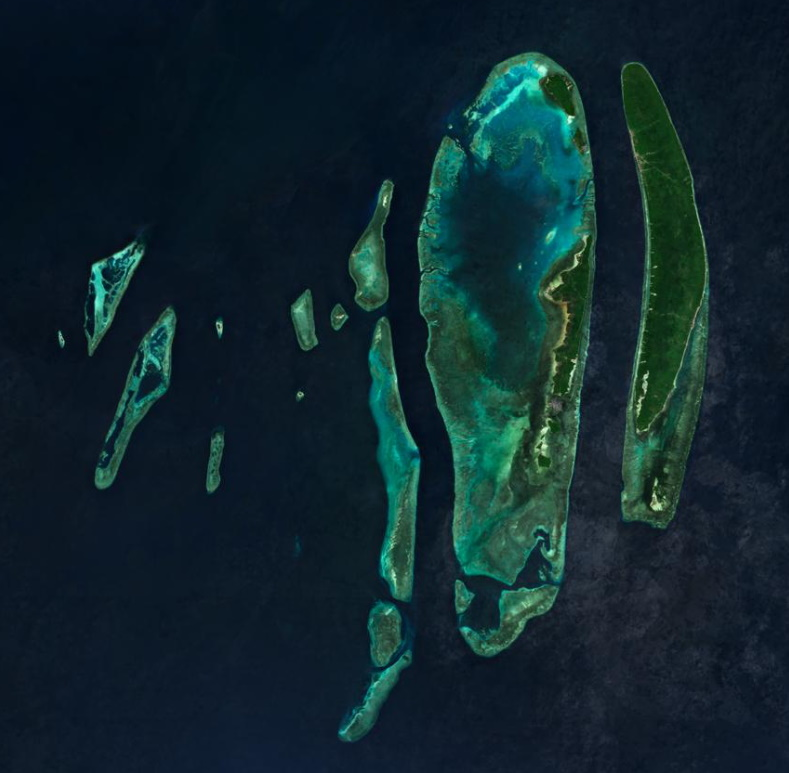
- Interactive map of Sibutu Islands

Geography
- Coordinates: 4°41′42.6″N 119°17′47.7″E
- Archipelago: Borneo
- Adjacent to: Sulu Sea, Celebes Sea, Sibutu Passage
- Major islands: Sibutu; Tumindao; Sitangkai; Omapui; Sipankot; Bulubulu

Administration
- Philippines
- Region: Bangsamoro
- Province: Tawi-Tawi
- Municipalities: Sitangkai; Sibutu
- Largest settlement: Sitangkai (pop. 33,334)

The Sibutu Islands are an archipelago in the southern Philippines. The islands are geographically and ethnologically part of Borneo. The archipelago consists of the following islands; Sibutu, Tumindao, Sitangkai, Omapui, Sipangkot, and Bulubulu, as well as other uninhabited islands.

Adjacent bodies of water include the Sulu Sea to the north, and the Celebes Sea to the south. The Sibutu Passage separate the islands from the rest of the Philippines.
