= Sheriff Abas =

Filipino former government official

Member of the Bangsamoro Parliament for Cotabato City's 1st parliamentary district
- Incumbent
- Assumed office October 30, 2026
- Preceded by: Office established

Chairperson of the Commission on Elections
- In office November 22, 2017 – February 2, 2022 interim until May 23, 2018
- Appointed by: Rodrigo Duterte
- Preceded by: Andres Bautista
- Succeeded by: Socorro Inting (acting)

Personal details
- Born: Sheriff Manimbayan Abas; May 5, 1979 (age 47)
- Party: UBJP
- Education: Notre Dame University; Ateneo de Davao University
- Occupation: Lawyer; government official

Sheriff Manimbayan Abas (born May 5, 1979) is a Filipino lawyer who served as chairman of the Commission on Elections (COMELEC) from 2017 to 2022, overseeing the 2018 barangay elections, the 2019 Bangsamoro autonomy plebiscite, and the 2019 general election. Aged 38 at his appointment, he is the youngest person and the first Muslim to serve as COMELEC chairman.

== Early life and education ==
Sheriff M. Abbas was born on May 5, 1979. He attended the Notre Dame University in Cotabato City where he obtained a degree in philosophy in 1999. He finished his law studies at the Ateneo de Davao University in 2004 and passed the Philippine Bar Examinations the following year.

== Career ==
=== Civil Service Commission ===
Abas worked at the now defunct Autonomous Region in Muslim Mindanao (ARMM) office of the Civil Service Commission (CSC) as a lawyer and acting assistant regional director. He was with the CSC from June 2007 to April 2015.

=== Commission on Elections ===
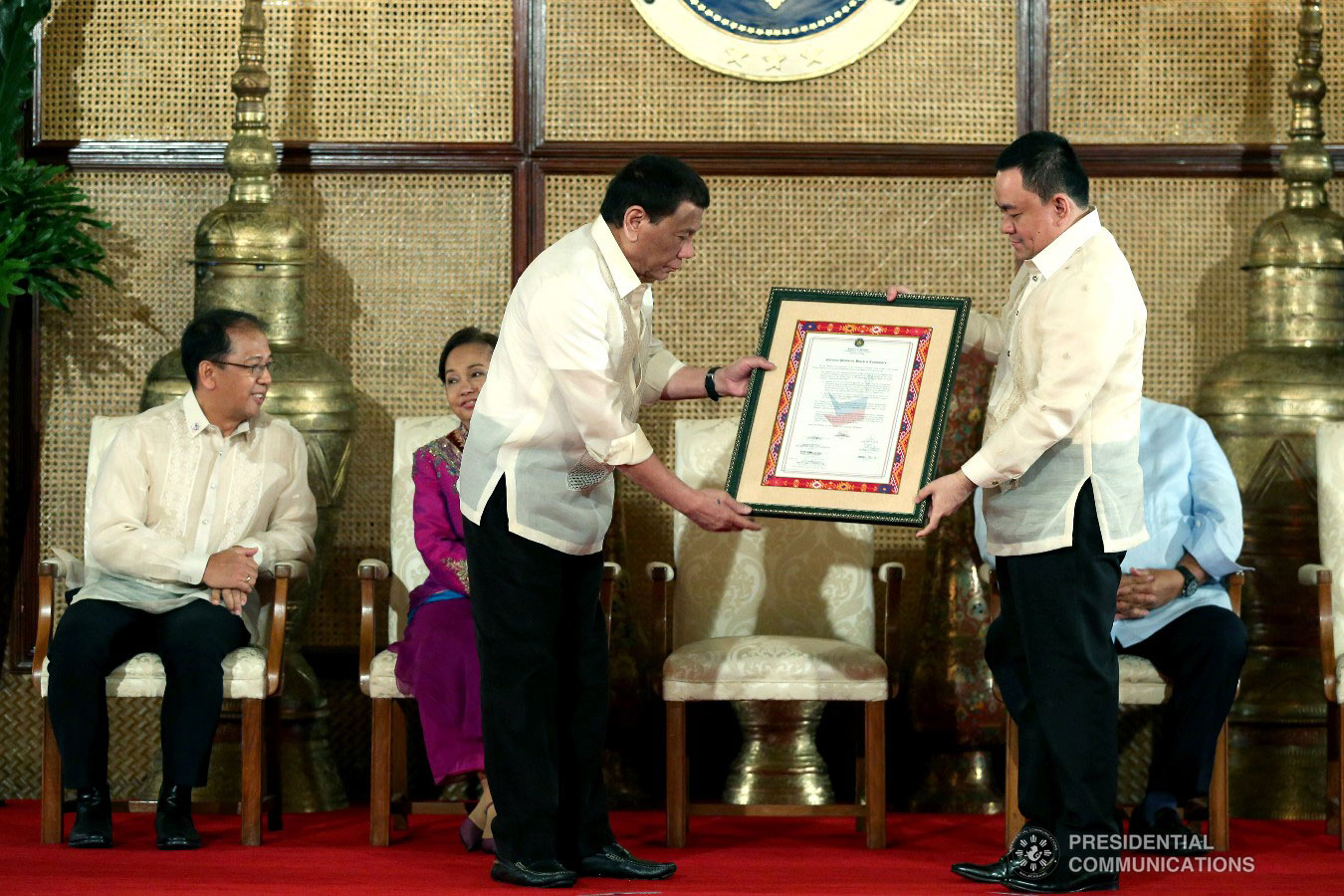
President Rodrigo Duterte (standing, left) receives the result of the 2019 Bangsamoro plebiscite for the Bangsamoro Organic Law, from COMELEC Chairman Abas during a ceremony at the Malacañang Palace.

Abas was appointed as a commissioner for the Commission on Elections (Comelec) in 2015 by president Benigno Aquino III on April 28, 2015. His appointment was questioned due to his then unconfirmed relationship with Moro Islamic Liberation Front (MILF) peace negotiator Mohagher Iqbal and according to critics his supposed lack of reputation among Muslim lawyers. His assignment to the Comelec came in when the Bangsamoro Basic Law, the proposed charter of a Bangsamoro autonomous region is still being debated in the Congress causing concerns that the MILF may have undue influence in a future plebiscite.

Abas was later appointed by President Rodrigo Duterte to be the Comelec chairman through a directive on November 22, 2017 succeeding Andres Bautista who resigned the prior month. He became the first Comelec chairman who is from Mindanao and the first Muslim head. He is also the youngest election chief at age 38. He is also the first commissioner to be promoted to chairman. He oversaw the conduct of the Bangsamoro autonomy plebiscite in January and February 2019 and the Philippine mid-term general elections in May of the same year.

Abas retired from the Comelec after his term as chairman expired on February 2, 2022 as scheduled.

=== 2026 Bangsamoro Parliament election ===
Abas on November 6, 2024 filed his candidacy to run for the position of representative of the 1st parliamentary district of Cotabato City at the Bangsamoro Parliament for the 2026 election. As the candidate of the United Bangsamoro Justice Party (UBJP), he was elected with 57.75% of the vote against Romeo Sema and Danilo Liggayo.

== Personal life ==
Abas is the nephew of Moro Islamic Liberation Front peace negotiator Mohagher Iqbal. He is from the province of Maguindanao. He was also a lecturer for Notre Dame University for three years.

Government offices
Preceded by Andres Bautista	Comelec chairman 2017–2022	Succeeded by Socorro B. Inting (acting)
