= Datu Abdullah Sangki =

Municipality in Maguindanao del Sur, Philippines

- Municipality
- Municipality of Datu Abdullah Sangki
- Municipal Hall

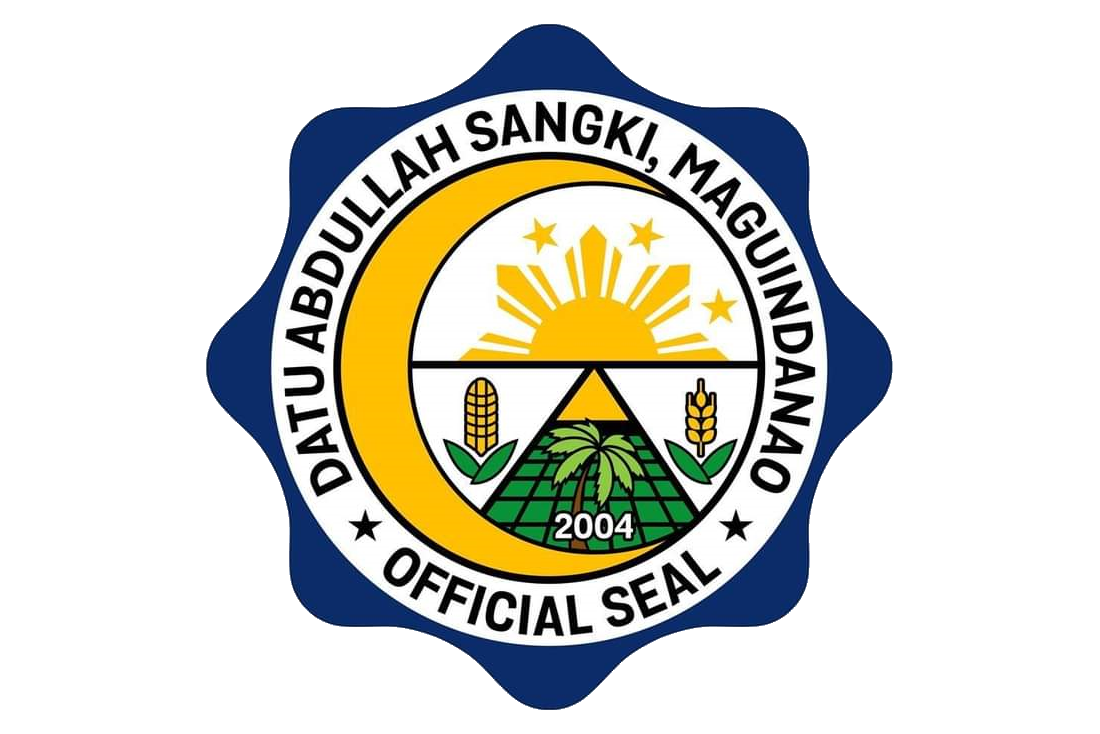
- Flag Seal

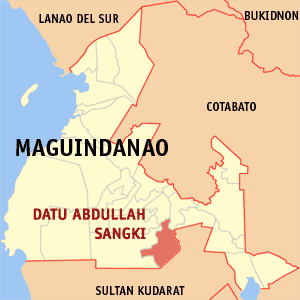
- Map of Maguindanao del Sur with Datu Abdullah Sangki highlighted
- Interactive map of Datu Abdullah Sangki
- Location within the Philippines
- Coordinates: 6°45′59″N 124°28′54″E
- Country: Philippines
- Region: Bangsamoro Autonomous Region in Muslim Mindanao
- Province: Maguindanao del Sur
- House district: Lone district
- Parliamentary district: 3rd district
- Founded: January 3, 2004
- Barangays: 10 (see Barangays)

Government
  - Type: Sangguniang Bayan
  - Mayor: Suharto Al Wali S. Mangudadatu
  - Vice Mayor: Samsodhen A. Sangki
  - House Representative: Mohamad P. Paglas Sr.
  - Municipal Council: Members: Noli E. Gumana; An-an S. Abutazil; Suad K. Sangki; Salahudin S. Baguinda; Suharto S. Mabang; Anatholly Ian C. Eterno; Datu Umbos M. Mamison; Khadaffi S. Sangki
  - Electorate: 33,228 voters (2025)

Area
  - Total: 220.00 km^{2} (84.94 sq mi)
- Elevation: 76 m (249 ft)
- Highest elevation: 737 m (2,418 ft)
- Lowest elevation: 20 m (66 ft)

Population (2024 census)
  - Total: 35,274
  - Density: 160.34/km^{2} (415.27/sq mi)
  - Households: 4,958

Economy
  - Income class: 2nd municipal income class
  - Poverty incidence: 35.04% (2023)
  - Revenue: ₱ 178.8 million (2024)
  - Assets: ₱ 281.7 million (2024)
  - Expenditure: ₱ 184.4 million (2024)
  - Liabilities: ₱ 96.6 million (2024)

Service provider
  - Electricity: Maguindanao Electric Cooperative (MAGELCO)
- Time zone: UTC+8 (PST)
- ZIP code: 9609
- PSGC: 1903828000
- IDD : area code: +63 (0)64
- Native languages: Maguindanao; Tagalog
- Website: www.lgu-das.org

Datu Abdullah Sangki, officially the Municipality of Datu Abdullah Sangki (Maguindanaon: Ingud nu Datu Abdullah Sangki; Iranun: Inged a Datu Abdullah Sangki; Tagalog: Bayan ng Datu Abdullah Sangki), is a municipality in the province of Maguindanao del Sur, Philippines. According to the 2024 census, it had a population of 35,274.

The municipality was created under Muslim Mindanao Autonomy Act No. 153, passed by the Regional Legislative Assembly on August 15, 2003, and approved on August 20, 2003, ratified in the plebiscite held on January 3, 2004. It was carved out from its mother town, Ampatuan. The MMA law creating the municipality provides that its administrative center shall be established in barangay Talisawa.

== Geography ==
=== Barangays ===
Datu Abdullah Sangki is politically subdivided into 10 barangays. Each barangay consists of puroks while some have sitios.

- Banaba
- Dimampao
- Guinibon
- Kaya-kaya
- Mao
- Maranding
- Old Maganoy
- Sugadol
- Talisawa
- Tukanalugong

=== Climate ===
Climate data for Datu Abdullah Sangki, Maguindanao del Sur
Month	Jan	Feb	Mar	Apr	May	Jun	Jul	Aug	Sep	Oct	Nov	Dec	Year
Mean daily maximum °C (°F)	31 (88)	31 (88)	32 (90)	32 (90)	31 (88)	30 (86)	30 (86)	30 (86)	30 (86)	30 (86)	30 (86)	31 (88)	31 (87)
Mean daily minimum °C (°F)	23 (73)	23 (73)	23 (73)	24 (75)	24 (75)	24 (75)	24 (75)	24 (75)	24 (75)	24 (75)	24 (75)	24 (75)	24 (75)
Average precipitation mm (inches)	64 (2.5)	45 (1.8)	59 (2.3)	71 (2.8)	140 (5.5)	179 (7.0)	192 (7.6)	198 (7.8)	163 (6.4)	147 (5.8)	113 (4.4)	66 (2.6)	1,437 (56.5)
Average rainy days	12.2	10.3	12.7	15.7	26.0	27.4	28.1	28.2	26.0	26.7	22.9	16.6	252.8
Source: Meteoblue (modeled/calculated data, not measured locally)(modeled/calculated data, not measured locally)

== Demographics ==
Population census of Datu Abdullah Sangki
Year	Pop.	±% p.a.
2007	33,259	—
2010	17,079	−21.54%
2015	23,878	+6.59%
2020	30,117	+5.01%
2024	35,274	+3.87%
Source: Philippine Statistics Authority

== Economy ==
Poverty Incidence of Datu Abdullah Sangki

Source: Philippine Statistics Authority
