= Maguindanao del Norte's 5th parliamentary district =

Parliamentary district for the Bangsamoro Parliament

- Constituency for the Bangsamoro Parliament
- Boundary of Maguindanao del Norte's 5th parliamentary district in Maguindanao del Norte
- Province: Maguindanao del Norte
- Population: 147,330 (2024)
- Electorate: 82,078 (2026)

Current constituency
- Member of Parliament: Ishak Mastura (elect)
- Political party: BFP

Maguindanao del Norte's 5th parliamentary district is the fifth of the five parliamentary districts of the province of Maguindanao del Norte for the Bangsamoro Parliament. It is composed of the municipality of Sultan Mastura in Maguindanao del Norte, and the barangays of Alamada, Banatin, Banubo, Bulalo, Calsada, Crossing Simuay, Dalumangcob, Damaniog, Darapanan, Gang, Inawan, Kakar, Katidtuan, Katuli, Ladia, Limbo, Maidapa, Makaguiling, Matengen, Mulaug, Nara, Nekitan, Olas, Panatan, Pigcalagan, Pigkelegan, Pinaring, Pingping, Raguisi, Rebuken, Salimbao, Sambolawan, Senditan, and Ungap in Sultan Kudarat, Maguindanao del Norte.

Ishak Mastura of the Bangsamoro Federalist Party is the member of Parliament-elect for the district following the inaugural 2026 Bangsamoro Parliament election. He will assume office on October 30, 2026.

== List of MPs representing the district ==
No.	Portrait	Member (Lifespan)	Term of office	Party	Parliament	Electoral history	Constituencies
1		Ishak Mastura (born 1971)	Assuming office on October 30, 2026	BFP	1st Parliament	Elected in 2026.	2026–present Municipality of Maguindanao del Norte: Sultan Mastura Barangays of Sultan Kudarat, Maguindanao del Norte: Alamada, Banatin, Banubo, Bulalo, Calsada, Crossing Simuay, Dalumangcob, Damaniog, Darapanan, Gang, Inawan, Kakar, Katidtuan, Katuli, Ladia, Limbo, Maidapa, Makaguiling, Matengen, Mulaug, Nara, Nekitan, Olas, Panatan, Pigcalagan, Pigkelegan, Pinaring, Pingping, Raguisi, Rebuken, Salimbao, Sambolawan, Senditan, Ungap

== Election results ==
=== 2026 ===
2026 Bangsamoro Parliament election in Maguindanao del Norte
Party	Candidate	Votes	%
BFP	Ishak Mastura	35,963	100.00
Total votes		35,963	100.00
BFP win (new seat)			
