= Sibutu =

Municipality in Tawi-Tawi, Philippines

Sibutu سيبوتو
- Municipality
- Municipality of Sibutu
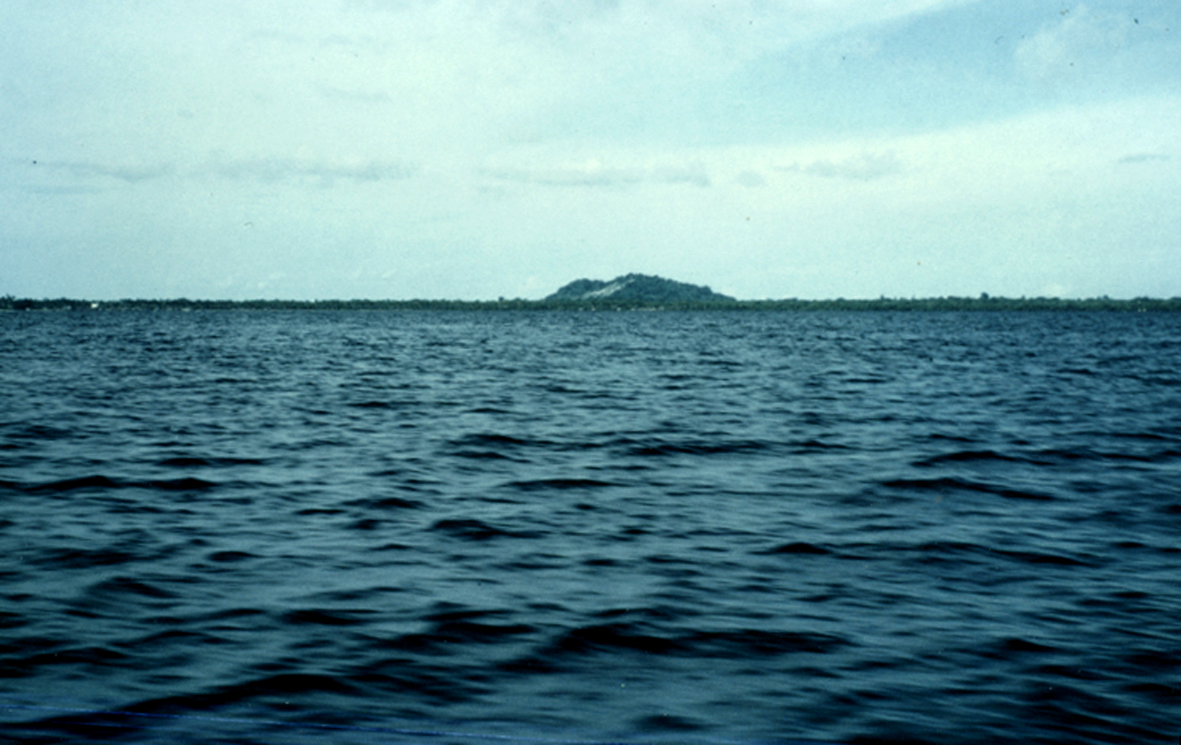
- Sibutu Island

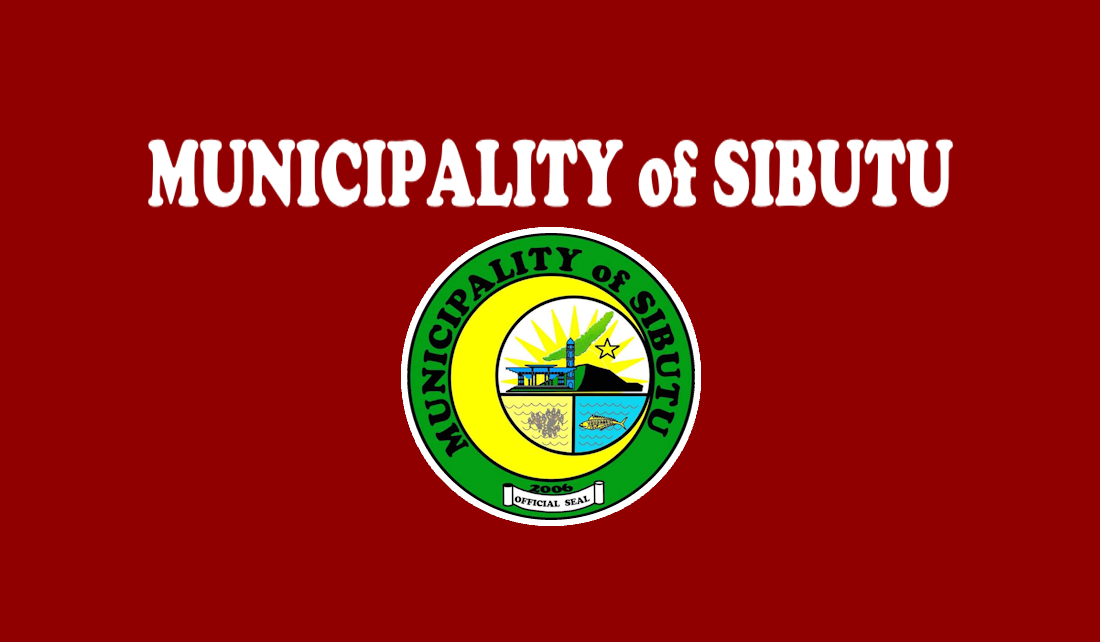
- Flag

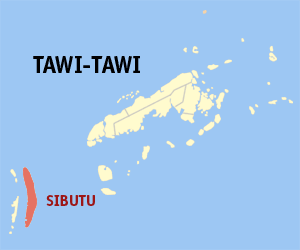
- Map of Tawi-Tawi with Sibutu highlighted
- Interactive map of Sibutu
- Location within the Philippines
- Coordinates: 4°50′28″N 119°27′32″E
- Country: Philippines
- Region: Bangsamoro Autonomous Region in Muslim Mindanao
- Province: Tawi-Tawi
- House district: Lone district
- Parliamentary district: 4th district
- Founded: October 21, 2006
- Barangays: 16 (see Barangays)

Government
  - Type: Sangguniang Bayan
  - Mayor: Nur-Fitra P. Ahaja
  - Vice Mayor: Alshefa J. Pajiji
  - House Representative: Dimszar M. Sali
  - Municipal Council: Members: Shaira S. Shalim; Edwardin B. Ibno; Shaydie J. Buanding; Haidir P. Anda; Al-Hasil B. Nahul; Wahab N. Abu; Husna J. Juhaili; Al-Randy N. Sulaiman
  - Electorate: 19,100 voters (2025)

Area
  - Total: 285.32 km^{2} (110.16 sq mi)
- Elevation: 1.0 m (3.3 ft)
- Highest elevation: 328 m (1,076 ft)
- Lowest elevation: 0 m (0 ft)

Population (2024 census)
  - Total: 38,070
  - Density: 133.4/km^{2} (345.6/sq mi)
  - Households: 5,692

Economy
  - Income class: 3rd municipal income class
  - Poverty incidence: 42.62% (2023)
  - Revenue: ₱ 144.1 million (2024)
  - Assets: ₱ 307 million (2024)
  - Expenditure: ₱ 133.9 million (2024)
  - Liabilities: ₱ 60.65 million (2024)

Service provider
  - Electricity: Tawi Tawi Electric Cooperative (TAWELCO)
- Time zone: UTC+8 (PST)
- ZIP code: 7510
- PSGC: 1907011000
- IDD : area code: +63 (0)68
- Native languages: Sama; Tagalog; Sabah Malay

Sibutu, officially the Municipality of Sibutu (Tagalog: Bayan ng Sibutu), is a municipality in the province of Tawi-Tawi, Philippines. According to the 2024 census, it has a population of 38,070 people.

== History ==
Due to an administrative error in the Treaty of Paris, while the remainder of the Philippines was ceded to the United States, Sibutu and Cagayán de Sulu were retained under Spanish sovereignty until they were formally ceded to the United States upon the ratification of the Treaty of Washington on March 23, 1901.

The municipality was created out of Sitangkai, Tawi-Tawi, by virtue of Muslim Mindanao Autonomy Act No. 197, which was subsequently ratified in a plebiscite held on October 21, 2006. Through Presidential Proclamation 691, October 21, 2024 was declared a special non-working day for the commemoration of the municipality's creation.

== Geography ==
It lies about 14 kilometres (8.7 mi) east of the coast of Sabah, Malaysia. The municipality covers the main island of Sibutu as well as four small uninhabited islands 3.5 to 6 kilometres (2.2 to 3.7 mi) south of the main island, which are, from north to south: Sicolan Calch Island, Sicolan Island, Sicolan Islet, and Saluag Island, the latter being the southernmost island of the Philippines. Sibutu Island is 50 kilometres (31 mi) away from Sabah state. People living in Sibutu Island are mostly boat builders. The people also sell seaweeds, firewood and stones.

Sibutu Island has an area is 109 square kilometres (42 sq mi). It is an important site for nature conservation.

=== Barangays ===
Sibutu is politically subdivided into 16 barangays. Each barangay consists of puroks while some have sitios.

- Ambutong Sapal
- Datu Amilhamja Jaafar
- Hadji Imam Bidin
- Hadji Mokhtar Sulayman
- Hadji Taha
- Imam Hadji Mohammad
- Nunukan
- Sheik Makdum
- Sibutu (Poblacion)
- Talisay
- Tandu Banak
- Tandu Owak
- Taungoh
- Tongehat
- Tongsibalo
- Ungus-ungus

=== Climate ===
Climate data for Sibutu, Tawi-Tawi
Month	Jan	Feb	Mar	Apr	May	Jun	Jul	Aug	Sep	Oct	Nov	Dec	Year
Mean daily maximum °C (°F)	29 (84)	29 (84)	29 (84)	30 (86)	30 (86)	30 (86)	29 (84)	30 (86)	30 (86)	30 (86)	29 (84)	29 (84)	30 (85)
Mean daily minimum °C (°F)	24 (75)	24 (75)	24 (75)	25 (77)	25 (77)	25 (77)	25 (77)	25 (77)	25 (77)	25 (77)	25 (77)	25 (77)	25 (77)
Average precipitation mm (inches)	157 (6.2)	115 (4.5)	123 (4.8)	96 (3.8)	136 (5.4)	120 (4.7)	104 (4.1)	89 (3.5)	86 (3.4)	131 (5.2)	151 (5.9)	159 (6.3)	1,467 (57.8)
Average rainy days	20.4	17.5	20.4	21.1	26.7	25.7	26.0	24.5	24.0	27.7	26.3	24.7	285
Source: Meteoblue

== Demographics ==
Population census of Sibutu
Year	Pop.	±% p.a.
2007	35,377	—
2010	28,532	−7.53%
2015	30,387	+1.21%
2020	34,243	+2.55%
2024	38,070	+2.58%
Source: Philippine Statistics Authority

== Economy ==
Poverty Incidence of Sibutu

Source: Philippine Statistics Authority
