= Lanao del Sur's 1st parliamentary district =

Parliamentary district for the Bangsamoro Parliament

- Constituency for the Bangsamoro Parliament
- Boundary of Lanao del Sur's 1st parliamentary district in Lanao del Sur
- Province: Lanao del Sur
- Population: 259,993 (2024)
- Electorate: 86,372 (2026)

Current constituency
- Member of Parliament: Pala Gandamra (elect)
- Political party: SIAP

Lanao del Sur's 1st parliamentary district is the first of the nine parliamentary districts of the province of Lanao del Sur for the Bangsamoro Parliament. It is solely composed of the city of Marawi.

Pala Gandamra of the SIAP Party is the member of Parliament-elect for the district following the inaugural 2026 Bangsamoro Parliament election. She will assume office on October 30, 2026.

== List of MPs representing the district ==
| No. | Portrait | Member (Lifespan) | Term of office | Party | Parliament | Electoral history | Constituencies |
|---|---|---|---|---|---|---|---|
| 1 | | Pala Gandamra (born 1978) | Assuming office on October 30, 2026 | SIAP | 1st Parliament | Elected in 2026. | 2026–present Marawi |

== Election results ==
=== 2026 ===
2026 Bangsamoro Parliament election in Lanao del Sur
| Party | Candidate | Votes | % |
|---|---|---|---|
| SIAP | Pala Gandamra | 63,832 | 84.71 |
| UBJP | Abdulrahman Taher | 8,325 | 11.05 |
| PRO Bangsamoro | Rudy Dianalan | 2,762 | 3.67 |
| Independent | Rolly Tomawis | 168 | 0.22 |
| BaPa | Abdul Aziz Macalangun Jr. | 148 | 0.20 |
| Independent | Almen Pangandaman | 121 | 0.16 |
| Total votes | | 75,356 | 100.00 |
| SIAP win (new seat) | | | |
