= Parliamentary districts of Bangsamoro =

Electoral districts in the Philippines

- Map (districts in dark gray; Cotabato City in inset)
- Category: Electoral district
- Location: Bangsamoro, Philippines
- Created: February 28, 2024
- Number: 32 (as of 2025)
- Populations: 101,178–259,993
- Government: Bangsamoro Parliament

Parliamentary districts of Bangsamoro refers to the electoral districts or constituencies into which the Bangsamoro Autonomous Region in Muslim Mindanao (BARMM) of the Philippines is divided for the purpose of electing 32 of the 80 members of the Bangsamoro Parliament.

The districts were initially created on February 28, 2024, and were subsequently reapportioned under Bangsamoro Autonomy Act No. 86 in January 2026. The 32 districts elected their first representatives in the 2026 Bangsamoro Parliament election on September 14, 2026.

== Background ==
The Bangsamoro Organic Law mandates the establishment of the a legislature for the Bangsamoro autonomous region. Thirty-two out of 80 members of the Bangsamoro Parliament are to come from parliamentary districts, which is distinct from the legislative districts of the national Philippine Congress.

The first attempt to establish parliamentary districts was through Parliament Bill No. 6.

Parliament Bill No. 297 was filed on December 18, 2023, during the second Bangsamoro Transition Authority Parliament.

The first public consultations on the bill started on January 15, 2024. There was debates on how the districts should be allocated. This includes advocacy for more districts for some localities than what is proposed on the bill.

On February 28, 2024, the Bangsamoro Parliament approved the bill proposing the creation of the parliamentary districts which became Bangsamoro Act No. 58. The bill was signed by Chief Minister Murad Ebrahim.

The exclusion of Sulu from the Bangsamoro due to a Supreme Court decision meant that the province will not be part of the inaugural 2025 regional elections. If the seven Sulu districts are not reallocated in time for the 2025 elections, the Sulu seats could remain unfilled. Parliament Bill No. 351 was filed to redistribute the seats. An additional district is proposed for each of the remaining five provinces, Cotabato City and the Special Geographic Area. Muslimin Sema, speaking as chairman of the Moro National Liberation Front opposes the reallocation insisting that the national Congress could work on Sulu's reintegration to the autonomous region. The Parliament failed to reallocate the seven parliamentary districts on time, rendering only 25 seats to be contested for the elections out of the allotted 32.

Parliament Bill No. 351 was approved nevertheless on August 19, 2025. The bill which became Bangsamoro Autonomy Act No. 77 was signed by Chief Minister Abdulraof Macacua on August 28, 2025.

Both Acts No. 58 and 77 were declared unconstitutional by the Supreme Court which also ordered the parliament to make a new law determining the districts by October 31, 2025.

The replacement law, Parliament Bill 415 was passed on January 13, 2026. Macacua signed the bill into law on January 20, 2026, becoming Bangsamoro Autonomy Act No. 86.

== List ==
Parliamentary districts of Basilan

Parliamentary districts of Cotabato City

Parliamentary districts of Lanao del Sur

Parliamentary districts of Maguindanao del Norte

Parliamentary districts of Maguindanao del Sur

Parliamentary districts of the Special Geographic Area

Parliamentary districts of Tawi-Tawi

The following are the parliamentary districts as defined by Bangsamoro Act No. 86.

District	Scope	Population (2024)	Electorate (2026)
Basilan's 1st	Lamitan	116,652	56,045
Basilan's 2nd	Akbar; Al-Barka; Hadji Mohammad Ajul; Tipo-Tipo; Tuburan	153,796	64,643
Basilan's 3rd	Sumisip; Tabuan-Lasa; Ungkaya Pukan	125,783	60.402
Basilan's 4th	Hadji Muhtamad; Lantawan; Maluso	145,716	67,158
Cotabato City's 1st	Poblacion IV; Poblacion VIII; Rosary Heights Mother; Rosary Heights I; Rosary Heights II; Rosary Heights III; Rosary Heights IV; Rosary Heights V; Rosary Heights VI; Rosary Heights VII; Rosary Heights IX	103,883	44,322
Cotabato City's 2nd	Bagua Mother; Bagua I; Bagua II; Bagua III; Kalanganan Mother; Kalanganan I; Kalanganan II; Poblacion V; Poblacion VI; Rosary Heights X; Rosary Heights XI; Rosary Heights XII; Rosary Heights XIII	154,883	53.560
Cotabato City's 3rd	Poblacion Mother; Poblacion II; Poblacion III; Poblacion IX; Rosary Heights VIII; Tamontaka Mother; Tamontaka I; Tamontaka II; Tamontaka III; Tamontaka IV; Tamontaka V	101,178	33,246
Lanao del Sur's 1st	Marawi	259,993	86.372
Lanao del Sur's 2nd	Kapai; Marantao; Piagapo; Saguiaran	137,228	91.282
Lanao del Sur's 3rd	Buadiposo-Buntong; Bubong; Ditsaan-Ramain; Maguing; Tagoloan	129,069	93,251
Lanao del Sur's 4th	Masiu; Mulondo; Poona Bayabao; Tamparan; Taraka	160,017	86,467
Lanao del Sur's 5th	Butig; Lumbaca-Unayan; Lumbatan; Lumbayanague; Marogong; Sultan Dumalondong; Tubaran	144,765	86,383
Lanao del Sur's 6th	Bayang; Binidayan; Ganassi; Pagayawan; Pualas	124,834	67,664
Lanao del Sur's 7th	Bacolod-Kalawi; Balindong; Madalum; Madamba; Tugaya	145,641	70,030
Lanao del Sur's 8th	Balabagan; Calanogas; Kapatagan; Malabang; Picong	149,713	83,345
Lanao del Sur's 9th	Amai Manabilang; Lumba-Bayabao; Wao	116,877	62,840
Maguindanao del Norte's 1st	Barira; Buldon; Matanog	130,123	66,326
Maguindanao del Norte's 2nd	Parang	123,309	60,656
Maguindanao del Norte's 3rd	Parts of Cotabato City; Poblacion I; Poblacion VII; Kabuntalan; Northern Kabuntalan; Parts of Sultan Kudarat; Bulibod; Kabuntalan; Kapimpilan; Katamlangan; Nalinan; Talitay	113,847	58.428
Maguindanao del Norte's 4th	Datu Blah T. Sinsuat; Datu Odin Sinsuat; Upi	250,358	152,030
Maguindanao del Norte's 5th	Parts of Sultan Kudarat; Alamada; Banatin; Banubo; Bulalo; Calsada; Crossing Simuay; Dalumangcob; Damaniog; Darapanan; Gang; Inawan; Kakar; Katidtuan; Katuli; Ladia; Limbo; Maidapa; Makaguiling; Matengen; Mulaug; Nara; Nekitan; Olas; Panatan; Pigcalagan; Pigkelegan; Pinaring; Pingping; Raguisi; Rebuken; Salimbao; Sambolawan; Senditan; Ungap; Sultan Mastura	147,330	82,078
Maguindanao del Sur's 1st	Datu Anggal Midtimbang; Datu Hoffer Ampatuan; Guindulungan; South Upi; Talayan	180,592	97,496
Maguindanao del Sur's 2nd	Datu Piang; Datu Salibo; Datu Saudi Ampatuan; Datu Unsay; Shariff Saydona Mustapha	132,625	78,920
Maguindanao del Sur's 3rd	Ampatuan; Datu Abdullah Sangki; Mamasapano; Shariff Aguak	137,102	90.615
Maguindanao del Sur's 4th	Buluan; Datu Paglas; Mangudadatu; Pandag	157,132	80,371
Maguindanao del Sur's 5th	Datu Montawal; General Salipada K. Pendatun; Pagalungan; Paglat; Rajah Buayan; Sultan sa Barongis	205,792	121.734
Special Geographic Area's 1st	Kadayangan; Nabalawag; Pahamuddin; Tugunan	104,582	62,637
Special Geographic Area's 2nd	Kapalawan; Ligawasan; Malidegao; Old Kaabakan	110,121	71,037
Tawi-Tawi's 1st	Bongao	131,887	71,260
Tawi-Tawi's 2nd	Languyan; Panglima Sugala; South Ubian	126,186	59,602
Tawi-Tawi's 3rd	Sapa-Sapa; Simunul; Tandubas	107,447	55,759
Tawi-Tawi's 4th	Mapun; Sibutu; Sitangkai; Turtle Islands	117,125	77.571

=== Number of districts by province ===
Province	No. of districts
Basilan	4
Lanao del Sur	9
Maguindanao del Norte	5
Maguindanao del Sur	5
Tawi-Tawi	4
Cotabato City (Note: Independent component city, grouped with Maguindanao del Norte)	3
Special Geographic Area (Note: Not a province. A collection of barangays in Cotabato province)	2
Total	32

== Previous apportionments ==
=== Bangsamoro Act No. 58 ===
The following were the parliamentary districts as defined by Bangsamoro Act No. 58.

District	Scope	Population (2020)
Basilan's 1st	Akbar; Lamitan; Hadji Mohammad Ajul	147,873
Basilan's 2nd	Al-Barka; Sumisip; Tipo-Tipo; Tuburan; Ungkaya Pukan	145,415
Basilan's 3rd	Hadji Muhtamad; Lantawan; Maluso; Tabuan-Lasa	132,964
Lanao del Sur's 1st	Kapai; Marantao; Piagapo; Saguiaran; Tagoloan II	127,790
Lanao del Sur's 2nd	Buadiposo-Buntong; Masiu; Mulondo; Poona Bayabao; Tamparan; Taraka	161,957
Lanao del Sur's 3rd	Bubong; Amai Manabilang; Lumba-Bayabao; Maguing; Ditsaan-Ramain; Wao	189,755
Lanao del Sur's 4th	Butig; Sultan Dumalondong; Lumbaca-Unayan; Marogong; Lumbatan; Lumbayanague	115,388
Lanao del Sur's 5th	Calanogas; Balabagan; Kapatagan; Picong; Malabang	133,341
Lanao del Sur's 6th	Bacolod-Kalawi; Tugaya; Balindong; Madalum; Madamba; Pualas	143,543
Lanao del Sur's 7th	Bayang; Binidayan; Ganassi; Pagayawan; Tubaran	116,743
Lanao del Sur's 8th	Marawi	207,010
Maguindanao del Norte's 1st	Matanog; Barira; Buldon	111,861
Maguindanao del Norte's 2nd	Parang; Sultan Mastura	128,245
Maguindanao del Norte's 3rd	Sultan Kudarat; Northern Kabuntalan; Kabuntalan; Talitay	174,300
Maguindanao del Norte's 4th	Datu Odin Sinsuat; Upi; Datu Blah T. Sinsuat	204,015
Maguindanao del Sur's 1st	South Upi; Talayan; Datu Anggal Midtimbang; Guindulungan; Datu Unsay; Datu Hoffer Ampatuan	170,060
Maguindanao del Sur's 2nd	Datu Saudi Ampatuan; Datu Salibo; Datu Piang; Shariff Saydona Mustapha; Mamasapano; Shariff Aguak; Ampatuan	194,045
Maguindanao del Sur's 3rd	Datu Abdullah Sangki; Rajah Buayan; Sultan sa Barongis; Pagagawan; Pagalungan; General S.K. Pendatun	197,279
Maguindanao del Sur's 4th	Paglat; Pandag; Buluan; Datu Paglas; Mangudadatu	162,374
Sulu's 1st	Jolo; Hadji Panglima Tahil; Pangutaran	181,546
Sulu's 2nd	Indanan; Parang	164,663
Sulu's 3rd	Maimbung; Talipao	159,685
Sulu's 4th	Panamao; Patikul	129,413
Sulu's 5th	Pata; Tapul; Panglima Estino; Lugus	108,827
Sulu's 6th	Kalingalan Caluang; Luuk; Omar; Banguingui	141,108
Sulu's 7th	Siasi; Pandami	114,866
Tawi-Tawi's 1st	Bongao; Mapun; Turtle Islands	151,839
Tawi-Tawi's 2nd	Languyan; South Ubian; Sapa-Sapa; Tandubas	134,575
Tawi-Tawi's 3rd	Panglima Sugala; Simunul; Sibutu; Sitangkai	153,862
Cotabato City's 1st	Poblacion; Poblacion I; Poblacion II; Poblacion III; Poblacion IV; Poblacion VIII; Poblacion IX; Rosary Heights II; Rosary Heights III; Rosary Heights IV; Rosary Heights IV; Rosary Heights IVI; Rosary Heights VII; Rosary Heights VIII; Rosary Heights XI; Tamontaka I; Tamontaka II; Tamontaka III; Tamontaka IV; Tamontaka V	144,117
Cotabato City's 2nd	Poblacion V; Poblacion VI; Poblacion VII; Bagua; Bagua I; Bagua II; Bagua III; Kalanganan; Kalanganan I; Kalanganan II; Rosary Heights; Rosary Heights I; Rosary Heights X; Rosary Heights XI; Rosary Heights XII; Rosary Heights XIII; Tamontaka	180,962
Special Geographic Area's at-large	Kadayangan; Kapalawan; Ligawasan; Malidegao; Nabalawag; Old Kaabakan; Pahamuddin; Tugunan	215,433

=== Bangsamoro Autonomy Act No. 77 ===
The following were the parliamentary districts as defined by Bangsamoro Autonomy Act No. 77.

District	Scope	Population (2024)
Basilan's 1st	Lamitan	116,652
Basilan's 2nd	Tuburan; Hadji Mohammad Ajul; Akbar; Al-Barka; Tipo-Tipo	153,796
Basilan's 3rd	Ungkaya Pukan; Sumisip; Tabuan-Lasa	125,783
Basilan's 4th	Maluso; Lantawan; Hadji Muhtamad	145,716
Lanao del Sur's 1st	Marawi	259,993
Lanao del Sur's 2nd	Saguiaran; Piagapo; Tagoloan II; Marantao	128,441
Lanao del Sur's 3rd	Ditsaan-Ramain; Kapai; Bubong; Buadiposo-Buntong; Maguing	137,856
Lanao del Sur's 4th	Masiu; Poona Bayabao; Tamparan; Taraka; Mulondo	160,017
Lanao del Sur's 5th	Butig; Lumbayanague; Lumbatan; Sultan Dumalondong; Lumbaca-Unayan; Marogong; Tubaran	144,765
Lanao del Sur's 6th	Pagayawan; Ganassi; Binidayan; Bayang; Pualas	124,834
Lanao del Sur's 7th	Madamba; Madalum; Bacolod-Kalawi; Tugaya; Balindong	145,641
Lanao del Sur's 8th	Calanogas; Malabang; Picong; Balabagan; Kapatagan	149,713
Lanao del Sur's 9th	Wao; Amai Manabilang; Lumba-Bayabao	116,877
Maguindanao del Norte's 1st	Matanog; Barira; Buldon	130,123
Maguindanao del Norte's 2nd	Parang	123,209
Maguindanao del Norte's 3rd	Northern Kabuntalan; Kabuntalan; Sultan Mastura; Talitay	112,773
Maguindanao del Norte's 4th	Datu Odin Sinsuat; Upi; Datu Blah T. Sinsuat	250,358
Maguindanao del Norte's 5th	Sultan Kudarat	124,965
Maguindanao del Sur's 1st	Datu Anggal Midtimbang; Talayan; Guindulungan; Datu Hoffer Ampatuan; South Upi	180,592
Maguindanao del Sur's 2nd	Datu Piang; Datu Salibo; Datu Saudi Ampatuan; Datu Unsay; Shariff Saydona Mustapha	132,625
Maguindanao del Sur's 3rd	Ampatuan; Datu Abdullah Sangki; Mamasapano; Shariff Aguak	137,102
Maguindanao del Sur's 4th	Buluan; Datu Paglas; Mangudadatu; Pandag	157,132
Maguindanao del Sur's 5th	Datu Montawal; General S.K. Pendatun; Pagalungan; Rajah Buayan; Sultan sa Barongis; Paglat	205,792
Tawi-Tawi's 1st	Bongao	131,887
Tawi-Tawi's 2nd	Languyan; South Ubian; Panglima Sugala	126,128
Tawi-Tawi's 3rd	Tandubas; Sapa-Sapa; Simunul	107,447
Tawi-Tawi's 4th	Mapun; Sitangkai; Sibutu; Turtle Islands	117,125
Cotabato City's 1st	Rosary Heights Mother; Rosary Heights I; Rosary Heights II; Rosary Heights III; Rosary Heights IV; Rosary Heights V; Rosary Heights VI; Rosary Heights VII; Poblacion VII; Poblacion VIII	104,127
Cotabato City's 2nd	Bagua Mother; Bagua I; Bagua II; Bagua III; Poblacion V; Poblacion VI; Kalagangan Mother; Kalagangan I; Kalagangan II; Rosary Heights X; Rosary Heights XI; Rosary Heights XII; Rosary Heights XIII	154,883
Cotabato City's 3rd	Tamontaka Mother; Tamontaka I; Tamontaka II; Tamontaka III; Tamontaka IV; Tamontaka V; Rosary Heights VIII; Rosary Heights IX; Poblacion Mother; Poblacion I; Poblacion II; Poblacion III; Poblacion IV; Poblacion IX	124,373
Special Geographic Area's 1st	Kadayangan; Nabalawag; Pahamuddin; Tugunan	104,582
Special Geographic Area's 2nd	Malidegao; Ligawasan; Old Kaabakan; Kapalawan	110,121

== See also ==
- Congressional districts of the Philippines
