= Bangsamoro Federalist Party =

Political party in the Bangsamoro

- President: Abdulraof Macacua
- Chairman: Abdulraof Macacua
- Secretary-General: Tamano Macacua
- Founded: March 2, 2026
- Headquarters: Cotabato City, Maguindanao del Norte, Philippines
- Membership (April 2026): 14,879
- Colors: Blue
- Slogan: Para sa Bangsamoro! (transl. For Bangsamoro!)
- House of Representatives: 1 / 8 (Bangsamoro seats only)
- Provincial governors: 3 / 6 (Bangsamoro seats only)
- Provincial vice governors: 2 / 6 (Bangsamoro seats only)
- Provincial board members: 0 / 46 (Bangsamoro seats only)
- Bangsamoro Parliament: 31 / 80

The Bangsamoro Federalist Party (BFP) is a regional parliamentary political party based in the Bangsamoro Autonomous Region in Muslim Mindanao (BARMM), Philippines. The party was formed for the 2026 Bangsamoro Parliament election, and serves as the regional organization of the Partido Federal ng Pilipinas.

== History ==
=== 2026 Bangsamoro elections ===
The BFP was established on March 2, 2026 in Cotabato City. On April 7, 2026, the BFP filed a “Petition for Registration with Manifestation to Participate in the 2026 BARMM Elections” at the Bangsamoro Electoral Office, the regional arm of the Commission on Elections (COMELEC), in the petition, the party claimed to have 14,879 members. The president of the BFP, Tomanda Antok claims that the party has the support of the overwhelming majority of mayors in four provinces. On May 28, 2026, over 2000 members of the Moro Islamic Liberation Front joined the BFP in separate ceremonies. On June 11, 2026, the mayor of Cotabato City, Bruce Matabalao along with other officials of the city announced their resignation from the United Bangsamoro Justice Party and took oath as members of the BFP.

On August 15, 2026, Interim Chief Minister Abdulraof Macacua joined the party and became the Party President and Chairman, replacing Tomanda Antok and became Party Executive Vice President. On the same day, the Interim Chief Minister's convoy was ambushed on the way back from the oathtaking held at his hometown Gambar, Kabuntalan at Datu Odin Sinsuat en route towards Cotabato City. The following day on August 16, 2026, three governors from Maguindanao del Norte, Maguindanao del Sur, and Tawi-Tawi, as well as the Vice Governor of Basilan joined the Party following the Interim Chief Minister. The governor of Lanao del Sur was also present at the event and pledged support.

The BFP condemned a disinformation campaign against them alleging that they are linked to Israel based largely on the similarities of its logo's color scheme with the Israeli flag, with the party emphasizing its members having been supporters of the Bangsamoro and Palestinian causes.

== Party officers ==
Party officers of the Bangsamoro Federalist Party as of April 2, 2026
Party position	Officer
Party Chairman And President	Abdulraof Macacua
General Party Committee Vice Chairman	Jordan S. Bayam
Party Vice President For Internal Affairs	Suwaib L. Oranon
Party Vice President For External Affairs	Datu Sharifudin Tucao P. Mastura
Party Vice President For Political Affairs	Nathaniel M. Midtimbang
Party Vice President For Special Concerns	Akmad I. Abas
Party Secretary-General	Tamano A. Macacua
Party Deputy Secretary-General	Dayan Lao Andoy
Executive Director	Mubarak D. Tiboron
Treasurer And Party Chairman Of Finance Committee	Kitem D. Kadatuan, Jr.
Party Chairman Of Nomination Committee	Alindatu K. Pagayao
Party Chairman Of Membership Committee	Quraish T. Langcap
Party Chairman Of Arbitral Committee	Ma-Arouph B. Candao
Party Chairman Of Law Committee	Erika May I. Draper
Party Chairman Of Election Committee	Dayan Lao Andoy
Party Chairman Of Committee On Women And Party Sectoral Wing For Women	Jehan Amella Usop
Party Chairman Of Committee On Youth And Party Sectoral Wing For Youth	Nur Jamel Abpet Ebrahim
Party Chairman Of Party Sectoral Wing For 'Ulama	Abdulgani Casim Pakir
Party Chairman Of Party Sectoral Wing For Settlers' Community	Susana S. Anayatin
Party Chairman Of Party Sectoral Wing For Non-Moro Indigenous People	Guimal B. Abdurahman
Party Chairman Of Party Sectoral Wing For Traditional Leaders	Datuteng U. Gumbila
Lanao Del Sur Provincial Chapter President	Akira I. Alonto
Maguindanao Del Norte Provincial Chapter President	Sultan Banjo Mampon
Maguindanao Del Sur Provincial Chapter President	Michael Midtimbang
Basilan Provincial Chapter President	Dan S. Asnawie
Tawi-Tawi Provincial Chapter President	Karwin Hamjani
Cotabato City Chapter President	Naguib G. Sinarimbо
Special Geographic Area Chapter President	Butch P. Malang
Marawi City Chapter President	Dr. Camid Gandamra Jr.
Lamitan City Chapter President	Suada Asnawie

== Electoral performance ==
Election	Leader	Proportional			District			Sectoral			Seats	±	Government
Election	Leader	Votes	%	Place	Votes	%	Place	Votes	%	Place	Seats	±	Government
2026	Abdulraof Macacua	678,328	35.86	1st	624,188	33.00	1st	2,011,045	20.86	3rd	31 / 80	New	TBA
