= United Bangsamoro Justice Party =

Political party in the Philippines

United Bangsamoro Justice Party (UBJP) حزب العدالة بانجسامورو المتحدة (Arabic)
- President: Murad Ebrahim
- Secretary-General: Sammy Al-Mansoor
- Founded: 2014
- Headquarters: Sultan Kudarat, Maguindanao del Norte
- Ideology: Islamic democracy Moro self-determinism
- National affiliation: Moro Islamic Liberation Front; National Unity Party (unofficial)
- Colors: Green
- House of Representatives: 0 / 8 (Bangsamoro seats only)
- Provincial governors: 1 / 6 (Bangsamoro only)
- Provincial vice governors: 1 / 6 (Bangsamoro only)
- Provincial board members: 2 / 46 (Bangsamoro regular seats only)
- Bangsamoro Parliament: 26 / 80

Election symbol

Website
- https://ubjp.org

The United Bangsamoro Justice Party (UBJP) is a political party based in Mindanao, Philippines, affiliated with the Moro Islamic Liberation Front (MILF).

== History ==
=== Formation ===
The United Bangsamoro Justice Party was organized in 2014 by the Moro Islamic Liberation Front (MILF) as a vehicle to run in future elections. The MILF, a rebel group which has been fighting for self-determination of the Moros in Mindanao, was anticipating the creation of a Bangsamoro autonomous region by 2016, after securing a peace deal with the Philippine government. The political party has formally been registered in May 2015 with the Commission on Elections (Comelec). The formation of the Bangsamoro region was delayed.

=== 2019 Bangsamoro plebiscite ===
In October 2018, the party announced its intention to campaign for the "yes" vote at the Bangsamoro Autonomous Region creation plebiscite to be held in January and February 2019 and decided not to participate in the May 2019 local elections, even though some members decided to participate as independents or under major parties like the NUP, Lakas and PDP-Laban.

=== 2022 Philippine elections ===
The UBJP fielded candidates for local positions to be contested in the 2022 Philippine elections. The party selected candidates who supported the Bangsamoro cause and the MILF-led Bangsamoro's government campaign to extend the transitional period of the region.

In April 2021, incumbent elected officials of the province of Tawi-Tawi joined the UBJP. They were joined by 11 Maguindanao mayors the following month marking the first batches of officials joining the UBJP.

The UBJP endorsed Esmael Mangudadatu and Bai Sandra Sema as candidates for governor and vice governor of Maguindanao for the 2022 elections.

While Chief Minister Murad Ebrahim tagged presidential candidate Isko Moreno as the "incoming president" during a courtesy call during the campaign period, on February 22 the UBJP released a clarification that it is not formally endorsing any candidate.

In April 2022, the UBJP along with Mangudadatu, eventually threw their support for Vice President Leni Robredo for president, with Bangsamoro Interim Chief Minister Murad Ebrahim stating that Robredo and the party are "overwhelmingly compatible" in terms of values and principles in relation to the Bangsamoro."

=== 2026 Bangsamoro election ===
The UBJP will take part in the first 2026 Bangsamoro Parliament election. In February 2024, the party claimed 20,000 members, double the minimum required members for political parties under the Bangsamoro Election Code.

== Leadership ==
President

- Murad Ebrahim (incumbent)

Secretary-General

- Sammy Al-Mansoor

Vice President for Central Mindanao

- Mohagher Iqbal

== Electoral performance ==
Election	Leader	Proportional			District			Sectoral			Seats	±	Government
Election	Leader	Votes	%	Place	Votes	%	Place	Votes	%	Place	Seats	±	Government
2026	Murad Ebrahim	613,663	32.44	2nd	580,227	30.67	2nd	4,222,422	43.79	1st	30 / 80	New	TBA

== See also ==
- List of Islamic political parties
- Bangsamoro Party
