= Candidates in the 2026 Bangsamoro Parliament election =

The following were the candidates in the 2025 Bangsamoro Parliament election that was scheduled to be held on October 13, 2025, but was postponed on October 1, 2025.

Also included here are the nominees of the regional political parties for the proportional seats.

== Proportional representation ==
No.	Party	Nominees
1	Bangsamoro Party	1. Omar Yasser Sema; 2. Abduliabbar Mamoclo; 3. Hatimil Hassan; 4. Naguib Solano; 5. Muslimin Jakilan; 6. Faizal Karon; 7. Michael Odin; 8. Soraida Matalam; 9. Dale Malna; 10. Phibibi Akip; 11. Abdulkarim Langkuno; 12. Dimasalang Docolano; 13. Giobay Diocolano; 14. Alvin Benito; 15. Datuido Endaila; 16. Kiram Angkal; 17. Khaidar Kangah; 18. Kamruddin Salahuddin; 19. Mariam Habib Hussin; 20. Noralyn Ragundo; 21. Rudy Sakandal; 22. Amrolah Serabo; 23. Abdurahman Jhovel; 24. Danny Andal; 25. Bailanie Abdula; 26. Dionisio Abanilla; 27. Pendatun Mohamad; 28. Orlanito Benito; 29. Baituron Karon; 30. Alimbsar Taib; 31. Norma Dalarnban; 32. Jaffar Mama; 33. Mariam Jumad; 34. Bai-Alabi Bantuas; 35. Luzminda Halud; 36. Tarhata Manalasal; 37. Hazar Ahmad; 38. Mokaledin Kido; 39. Rodrigo Aviles; 40. Theng Salipada
2	Raayat Democratic Party	1. Nadia Lorena; 2. Nasser Mustafa; 3. Asraf Usodan; 4. Hassibal Adil; 5. Datu Udtog Matalam IV; 6. Bainoraona Oyod; 7. Mosib Balabadan; 8. Habib Sakib Habib Husin; 9. Masiding Loma; 10. Lilibeth Guiamano; 11. Yusop Ismael; 12. Amerhussien Acoon; 13. Ameliana Ogregado; 14. Clenejean Salvador; 15. Fernando Cabugsa; 16. Yuhaimah Malumbal; 17. William Balacano; 18. Elenie Omar; 19. Irham Maamor; 20. Esmail Lacsaman; 21. Nursiya Muksin; 22. Edgar Sagun; 23. Camar Ampuan; 24. Ibrahim Abubakar; 25. Jul-Amri Isahak; 26. Dimhal Ebing; 27. Richard Chudian; 28. Zia Sahawi; 29. Charliemen Lipae; 30. Randy Francis Ramos; 31. Nor-Ahmad Jainuddin; 32. Lito Salapuddin; 33. Endria Hayal; 34. Saidamen Ali; 35. Aisa Abolais; 36. Norjannah Mangacop; 37. Schenette Druz Ali; 38. Datu Shariff Hamin Adil; 39. Johara Abedin; 40. Arnel Kampang
3	BARMM Grand Coalition	1. Mamintal Adiong III; 2. Amer Zaakaria Rakim; 3. Abdulrahman Rubbil Mangudadatu; 4. Datu Bimbo Sinsuat; 5. Amilbahar Mawallil; 6. Abdel Razi Amin; 7. Sittie Aisah Pansar; 8. Datu Ibrahim Sinsuat Jr.; 9. Al-Mashor Yasin; 10. Juliet Limpalan Tammang; 11. Alirakim Tocalo Munder; 12. Punduma Sani; 13. Alfiya Akbar; 14. Alyssa Sahali Tan; 15. Datu Ombra Sinsuat Jr.; 16. Hanan Tomawis Manabilang; 17. Mustapha Kabalu; 18. Soekarno Julkipli Mohammad; 19. Nuriya Jamaldin; 20. Nurjay Sahali; 21. Faizal Amatoding Padate; 22. Labimombao Dima-Macabando; 23. Badrodin Mangindra; 24. Noraida Abo; 25. Sheila Gul Ganda; 26. Bashier Dimalaang Manalao; 27. Ruhollah Pendatun Ali; 28. Camid Usman Gandamra Jr.; 29. Edna Abidin Alibasa; 30. Sheryll Yasmin Lim Sangki; 31. Jumlyn Gayak Sumlay; 32. Khalid Sumayan Lininding; 33. Jamar Musa Jamiri; 34. Rahib Panumpang Payapat; 35. Nurjaafar Mandaling Kamuh; 36. Nurziana Uddoh Hamsan; 37. Saffrullah Marohomsalic Dipatuan; 38. Hamid Timbao Karon; 39. Musa Kadija-Sultan Diamla; 40. Aida Joe Hadji
4	Mahardika Party	1. Tarhata Maglangit; 2. Randolph Climaco Parcasio; 3. Abdul-Aziz Mangandaki Amenoden; 4. Abduljabbar Panotolan Jialil; 5. Yahodza Salamat Simpal; 6. Abdulajid Alongan Mandong; 7. Hatima Abdul Kharid; 8. Tony Mulammad Musim; 9. Alongan Magadapa Dimacaling; 10. Sanaon Shariff Mundas; 11. Alilkre Raiazaman Basher; 12. Mustapha Budian Abduiwahab; 13. Asiah Saripad alagawa 14. Faisal Hanapi Esmael; 15. Bilgadil Mohaddam Albani; 16. Casim Solaiman Sarip; 17. Ahmad-Ali Manabilang Abdullah; 18. Ringcar Bagobodara Pinote; 19. Pompong Ayonan Hadji Ali; 20. Sulay Hassan Halipa; 21. Aida Husman Abdulla; 22. Abidah Paman Ali; 23. Ibrahim Ronda Abdulgani; 24. Salma Sambulawan Mala; 25. Aspie Atalad Abdurahman; 26. Shirley Asbi Isnang; 27. Abdulwadud Bahasuan Abbas; 28. Mohammad Kiblanzed Panday Sharifah; 29. Cairoden Usngan Caderan; 30. Tatabai Mantawil Malang; 31. Al-Habson Habiba Antao; 32. Franceria Muksan Abdulsalam; 33. Sakib Abdurahim Salaiin; 34. Sitti Hajar Isnang Julhari; 35. Aisa Lagasan Pacasirang; 36. Saada Jao Tubing; 37. Abdulbaki Malunud Tarsi; 38. Suharto Utto Adzis; 39. Umra Jaapal Wahab; 40. Naque Omar Amad
5	Moro Ako Party	1. Najeeb Taib; 2. Datu Marohomsar Gaya; 3. Johaena Marcom; 4. Omar Masiding; 5. Borhanuddin Alcozbary II; 6. Connie Dumato; 7. Annas Deriposun; 8. Mistiri Tarami; 9. Noroden Aloyodan; 10. Moifidah Panda; 11. Mamangilay Macabangua Nanak; 12. Camal-Falih Dangcal Sarangani; 13. Rolaysa Macabangkit Ampoga; 14. Johair Grande Esmael; 15. Omar Radiamoda Datuimam; 16. Asnaynie Masorong Macabando; 17. Hanifah Sinalo Athing; 18. Azisa Datumulok Hadji Ibrahim; 19. Norsida Hadji Ismail Sangca; 20. Farida Dimalotang Natangcop; 21. Sonaya Abanto Rakim; 22. Mohaimen Sinalo Athing; 23. Saleha Baraucor Pumbayabaya; 24. Alianamarie Maca-Alin MacaAlin; 25. Shahrani Sumaguina Dimacaling; 26. Aisha Tawaki Calalagan; 27. Samsidah D. Lucman; 28. Nor Juharie Mambayao Gamao; 29. Jonaisa Adap Omar-Ali; 30. Isnihaya Macatoon Lamendang; 31. Mengkong Ali Ganion; 32. Norgie Balah Salipada; 33. Emilly Antikan Amil; 34. Datu Nur Gaya Salilama; 35. Amira Tungao Uyag; 36. Norhamida Maraveles Gaya; 37. Sittie Farisha Sali Abdullah; 38. Noraina Dian Salik; 39. Meriam Guiamalon Abdullah; 40. Rebecca Kasuyo Luque
6	Progresibong Bangsamoro Party	1. Don Mustapha Loong; 2. Samilee Kong Pianah; 3. Omar Mantar Barangai; 4. Saan Ibrahim Amate; 5. Mohaimin Liawao Minirigue; 6. Elias Bauda Pangcoga; 7. Abdulkarim Siddiq Macarampat; 8. Aguirre Alawi Dipatuan; 9. Nasser Sampao Azis; 10. Harisul Tanadjanul Samanul; 11. Nasser Ayunan Lidasan; 12. Mabrick Barang Tupay; 13. Tony Manedzin Ayunan; 14. Amanoding Panangcatan Dirampatan; 15. Aminoden Camulo Olama; 16. Al-Shadikh Budlong Dais; 17. Ryan Al Ameer Carama Aldam; 18. Kim Sapie Wahab; 19. Kamal Lungkatay Samanudin; 20. Thong Mokalam Emblawa; 21. Edgar Guiarn Collado; 22. Charez Baringue; 23. Jonaisa Raonan Aday; 24. Mayvelle Jorilo Emblawa; 25. Lorna Pasaol Rogong; 26. Jacquiline Lape Terania; 27. Abdulsattar Gumanti Usman; 28. Sukamo Abdulsamad Salik; 29. Toks Bulando Guialal; 30. Leony Sabay Tampos; 31. Donda Kamensa Anayatin; 32. Jahrilypee Magbanua Mokudef; 33. Vilma Dalin Anayatin; 34. Mohamad Norodin Lumantag; 35. Alvirano Sinstat Zacafia; 36. Jacquelen Talusob Mokamad; 37. Suharto Dindah Iba; 38. Bai Ali Utap Endaila; 39. Sheila Mantawil Maruique; 40. Jocelyn Batawan Nul
7	United Bangsamoro Justice Party	1. Murad Ebrahim; 2. Mohagher Iqbal; 3. Ali Solaiman; 4. Eduard Guerra; 5. Ibrahim Ali; 6. Said Salendab; 7. Sha Elijah Dumama-Alba; 8. Pangalingan Balindong; 9. John Anthony Lim; 10. Haber Asarul; 11. Raissa Jajurie; 12. Said M. Shiek; 13. Haron M. Abas; 14. Ali O. Salik; 15. Abdulwahab Pak; 16. Akmad Abas; 17. Suwaib Oranon; 18. Ali Lanang Jr.; 19. Alim Jibril Salliman; 20. Shameera Matolo-Macaraig; 21. Baileng Mantawil; 22. Basit Abbas; 23. Abdullah Macapaar; 24. Matarul Estino; 25. Amiroddin Gayak; 26. Sulnrto Sandayan Esmael; 27. Faiz Sapantun Alauddin; 28. Mudlib Compania Abu; 29. Sukamo Utunain Asri; 30. Benjamin Tupay Loong; 31. Eddie Mapag Alih; 32. Norsalam Guiamadin Bago; 33. Jamal Lagrosas Amin; 34. Noraida Sinalindo Chio; 35. Juckra Guiaman Abdulmalik; 36. Naima Gumaga Pendi; 37. Samaona Pangompig Unda; 38. Shaimah Silongan Agasor; 39. Sitti Ruaida Imran Ismi; 40. Jehan Amella Usop

== Single member districts ==
Province/City	District	Candidate	Party
Basilan	1st	Marvin Baisara	Al Ittihad–UKB Party
Basilan	1st	Abubakar Cutal	Bangsamoro Party
Basilan	1st	Rima Hassan	Independent
Basilan	1st	Pai Sali	United Bangsamoro Justice Party
Basilan	2nd	Mosber Alauddin	United Bangsamoro Justice Party
Basilan	2nd	Altun Angeles	Al Ittihad–UKB Party
Basilan	2nd	Abdalun Awilun	Independent
Basilan	2nd	Jun Ilimin	Progresibong Bangsamoro Party
Basilan	2nd	Abdulsamie Kallahal	BARMM Grand Coalition
Basilan	2nd	Abdulmuhmin Mujahid	Bangsamoro Party
Basilan	3rd	Dodong Hadjirul	Independent
Basilan	3rd	Abrar Hataman	United Bangsamoro Justice Party
Basilan	3rd	Kandalvi Hataman	BARMM Grand Coalition
Basilan	3rd	Monar Ibno	Bangsamoro Party
Cotabato City	1st	Sheriff Abas	United Bangsamoro Justice Party
Cotabato City	1st	Reynaldo Canen	Independent
Cotabato City	1st	Romeo Sema	Independent
Cotabato City	2nd	Omboy Ala	Independent
Cotabato City	2nd	Jaafar Malikol Ali	Independent
Cotabato City	2nd	Madatu Datumanong	Bangsamoro Party
Cotabato City	2nd	Datu Mando Kindi	Mahardika Party
Cotabato City	2nd	Zahrumin Midtimbang	United Bangsamoro Justice Party
Cotabato City	2nd	Naguib Sinarimbo	Serbisyong Inklusibo–Alyansang Progresibo
Lanao del Sur	1st	Sheikdato Binnortominoray	Independent
Lanao del Sur	1st	Rudy Dianalan	Progresibong Bangsamoro Party
Lanao del Sur	1st	Pala Gandamra	Serbisyong Inklusibo–Alyansang Progresibo
Lanao del Sur	1st	Abdul Aziz Macalangun	Bangsamoro Party
Lanao del Sur	1st	Hadji Mohaimen	Independent
Lanao del Sur	1st	Momoy Tomawis	United Bangsamoro Justice Party
Lanao del Sur	1st	Rolly Tomawis	Independent
Lanao del Sur	2nd	Mohammadali Abinal	Progresibong Bangsamoro Party
Lanao del Sur	2nd	Boyet Alonto	Serbisyong Inklusibo–Alyansang Progresibo
Lanao del Sur	2nd	Ibrahim Camama	Independent
Lanao del Sur	2nd	Hamza Gauraki	United Bangsamoro Justice Party
Lanao del Sur	2nd	Cadar Guro	Bangsamoro Party
Lanao del Sur	2nd	Ansaroden Lucman Moner	Independent
Lanao del Sur	2nd	Abdul Tomawis	Independent
Lanao del Sur	3rd	Rauf Adiong	Serbisyong Inklusibo–Alyansang Progresibo
Lanao del Sur	3rd	Jalal Bayabao	Bangsamoro Party
Lanao del Sur	3rd	James Macaraya	United Bangsamoro Justice Party
Lanao del Sur	3rd	Edrieza Rimbang	Partido Demokratiko Pilipino
Lanao del Sur	4th	Johari Camadug	Katipunan ng Kamalayang Kayumanggi
Lanao del Sur	4th	Lampa Pandi	United Bangsamoro Justice Party
Lanao del Sur	4th	Odin Sumagayan	Serbisyong Inklusibo–Alyansang Progresibo
Lanao del Sur	5th	Arimao Asum	Serbisyong Inklusibo–Alyansang Progresibo
Lanao del Sur	5th	Jhamila Busran	Katipunan ng Kamalayang Kayumanggi
Lanao del Sur	5th	Samporna Domaorong	Mahardika Party
Lanao del Sur	5th	Raki Mala	Independent
Lanao del Sur	5th	Esmail Mama	United Bangsamoro Justice Party
Lanao del Sur	5th	Abdullah Musa	Independent
Lanao del Sur	5th	Baba Tago	Independent
Lanao del Sur	6th	Jamael Balt	United Bangsamoro Justice Party
Lanao del Sur	6th	Moamar Cabugatan	Progresibong Bangsamoro Party
Lanao del Sur	6th	Hosni Macapodi	Serbisyong Inklusibo–Alyansang Progresibo
Lanao del Sur	6th	Salman Shiek	Independent
Lanao del Sur	7th	Dan Dan Datudacula	Independent
Lanao del Sur	7th	Nordjiana Ducol	United Bangsamoro Justice Party
Lanao del Sur	7th	Koko Mapupuno	Independent
Lanao del Sur	7th	Rayyan Mindalano	Serbisyong Inklusibo–Alyansang Progresibo
Lanao del Sur	7th	Soraida Sarangani	Independent
Lanao del Sur	8th	Che Balindong	Serbisyong Inklusibo–Alyansang Progresibo
Lanao del Sur	8th	Gary Balindong	United Bangsamoro Justice Party
Lanao del Sur	8th	Nassif Dimaporo	Mahardika Party
Lanao del Sur	8th	Saipoden Torayas	Progresibong Bangsamoro Party
Maguindanao del Norte	1st	Jimmy Balitok	United Bangsamoro Justice Party
Maguindanao del Norte	1st	Gazzali Jafar Tomawis	BARMM Grand Coalition
Maguindanao del Norte	1st	Prince Khalid Tomawis	Independent
Maguindanao del Norte	2nd	Pendaliday Beda	United Bangsamoro Justice Party/Independent
Maguindanao del Norte	2nd	Abulhadie Gumander	Independent
Maguindanao del Norte	2nd	Ibrahim Ibay	United Bangsamoro Justice Party
Maguindanao del Norte	2nd	Mosib Salipada	Progresibong Bangsamoro Party
Maguindanao del Norte	3rd	Naks Baraguir	Independent
Maguindanao del Norte	3rd	Abdulraof Macacua	United Bangsamoro Justice Party
Maguindanao del Norte	3rd	Badrudin Mamad	Mahardika Party
Maguindanao del Norte	3rd	Ishak Mastura	Progresibong Bangsamoro Party
Maguindanao del Sur	1st	Edres Kasim	Mahardika Party
Maguindanao del Sur	1st	Makaltol Mama	Independent
Maguindanao del Sur	1st	Tawakal Midtimbang	United Bangsamoro Justice Party
Maguindanao del Sur	1st	Datunasser Rajamuda	BARMM Grand Coalition
Maguindanao del Sur	2nd	Marop Ampatuan	BARMM Grand Coalition
Maguindanao del Sur	2nd	Basco Sabpa	Independent
Maguindanao del Sur	2nd	Solaiman Sandigan	Independent
Maguindanao del Sur	2nd	Datu Edo Upam	Bangsamoro Party
Maguindanao del Sur	3rd	Anwar Alamada	United Bangsamoro Justice Party
Maguindanao del Sur	3rd	Alibai Dalgan	Bangsamoro Party/Mahardika Party
Maguindanao del Sur	3rd	Ali Sangki	BARMM Grand Coalition
Maguindanao del Sur	4th	Salahuddin Abdullah	Mahardika Party
Maguindanao del Sur	4th	Datu Amerson Bansawagan	Bangsamoro Party
Maguindanao del Sur	4th	DJ Parok Mangudadatu	United Bangsamoro Justice Party
Maguindanao del Sur	4th	Mohammed Paglas	BARMM Grand Coalition
Special Geographic Area	Lone	Mohammad Kelie Antao	United Bangsamoro Justice Party
Special Geographic Area	Lone	Allanuddin Hassan	Independent
Special Geographic Area	Lone	Harris Piang	Bangsamoro Party
Special Geographic Area	Lone	Kenindia Sinagandal	Al Ittihad–UKB Party
Special Geographic Area	Lone	Sultan Dulia	Independent
Tawi-Tawi	1st	Edwin Iddi	BARMM Grand Coalition
Tawi-Tawi	1st	Julbert Que	United Bangsamoro Justice Party
Tawi-Tawi	1st	Nagder Sangkula	Bangsamoro Party
Tawi-Tawi	2nd	Alnahada Dalagan	Bangsamoro Party
Tawi-Tawi	2nd	Gamz Hayudini	BARMM Grand Coalition
Tawi-Tawi	2nd	Hamid Ladjakhal	Independent
Tawi-Tawi	2nd	Hadjimar Matba	United Bangsamoro Justice Party
Tawi-Tawi	3rd	Nur Mahadil Ahaja	United Bangsamoro Justice Party
Tawi-Tawi	3rd	Albrinji Mali	Independent
Tawi-Tawi	3rd	Datu Atik Manulon	BARMM Grand Coalition
