= Nominees in the 2026 Bangsamoro Parliament election =

The following are the nominees for the 2026 Bangsamoro Parliament election by regional political party as of November 9, 2024. Section 4 of Republic Act No. 12317, resetting the first regular parliamentary election which will be held on September 14, 2026, provide that the Commission on Elections shall set a new period for the filing of certificates of candidacy for both parliamentary district representatives and political party or coalition nominees. This means that previous nominees could be retained in the roster of COMELEC-accredited political parties, alongside new nominees which may be fielded by the said parties.

Only nominees for the seats via proportional representation of political parties are included. It excludes candidates for the parliamentary districts of Bangsamoro or the reserved sectoral representatives seats.

== List ==
Party	Nominees
Alliance of Bangsamoro Tri-Peoples Party	1. Rahib Kudto; 2. Emran Mohamad; 3. Allan Pisingan; 4. Badrodin Mangindra; 5. Ansary Diamaoden; 6. Jeckreny Padeño; 7. Melanio Ulama; 8. Ailafa Atiulla; 9. Naut Usman; 10. Rahima Bawasanta; 11. Nassif Dimaporo; 12. Norodin Donton; 13. Saida Makmod; 14. Abdulbasir Mustapha; 15. Norumbai Kasim; 16. Mlang Madal; 17. Baisanie Macabuat-Amella; 18. Taib Amil; 19. Zacaria Tuan; 20. Anwar Musa; 21. Rachel Ann Sagal; 22. Baimila Bagundang; 23. Jay Sabangan; 24. Efren Butuan; 25. Akrima Maguid; 26. Tungko Tadtagan; 27. Hamza Ayunan; 28. Jaafar Ali; 29. Noraisa Abdulrahman; 30. Norsia Abdulgani; 31. Sapiya Tucalan; 32. Makalangkong Silo; 33. Benjamin Kalim; 34. Esmael Lucas; 35. Rosel Salazar; 36. Felino Samar; 37. Pahatma Diagao; 38. Salahudin Halid; 39. Hasna Arap; 40. Bogie Sendad
Bangsamoro Party	1. Omar Yasser Sema; 2. Abduljabbar Mamoclo; 3. Soraida Matalam; 4. Hatimil Hassan; 5. Muslimin Jakilan; 6. Bai-Alabi Bantuas; 7. Faizal Karon; 8. Naguib Solano; 9. Phibibi Akip; 10. Michael Odin; 11. Dale Malna; 12. Giobai Diocolano; 13. Abdulkarim Langkuno; 14. Dimasalang Diocolano; 15. Mariam Habib Hussin; 16. Alvin Benito; 17. Datuido Endaila; 18. Noralyn Ragundo; 19. Kiram Angkal; 20. Khaidar Kangah; 21. Bailanie Abdula; 22. Kamruddin Salahudin; 23. Rudy Sakandal; 24. Baituron Karon; 25. Amrollah Serabo; 26. Abdulrahman Jhovel; 27. Norma Dalamban; 28. Danny Andal; 29. Mariam Jumad; 30. Dionisio Abanilla; 31. Pendatun Mohammad; 32. Luzminda Halud; 33. Orlanito Benito; 34. Alimbsar Talib; 35. Tarhata Manalasal; 36. Jafar Mama; 37. Theng Salipada; 38. Hazar Ahmad; 39. Mokaliden Kido; 40. Rodrigo Aviles
Bangsamoro Empowerment and Social Transformation Party	1. Al-Rashid Balt; 2. Datu Marohomsar Gaya; 3. Emelita Cordero; 4. Sharifa Ain Lipae; 5. Connie Dumato; 6. Aljeem Salih; 7. Mistiri Tarami; 8. Rosnu Janjalawa; 9. Joan Kate Uy; 10. Bernard Carmelo; 11. Peter Morales; 12. Jessica Abing; 13. Jay Nable; 14. Ronjet Rej Rizal; 15. Leilani Eubank; 16. Danilo Vergara; 17. Walid Zyad Cali; 18. Argelyn Aguinaldo; 19. Brayan Saguban; 20. Ansal Nasalal; 21. Leah Marie Laminares; 22. Rodney Lusa; 23. Sulminda Limpasan; 24. Marjuk Unggas; 25. Carmelito Gasa; 26. Ranulfo Ramos Jr.; 27. Mayflor Alcantara; 28. Archie Linobo; 29. Norhana Mamaingco; 30. Rowena Alpha; 31. Rosalie Bentoy; 32. Marcelino Iburan Jr.; 33. Jonaisa Omar-Ali; 34. Marina Lao; 35. Datunur Salilama; 36. Alicia Miñoza; 37. Marieta Colong; 38. Nenita Soldevilla; 39. Odyssey Masalicampo; 40. Jong Jong Mangacop
Bangsamoro Federalist Party	1. Suaib Oranon; 2. Abdulwahid Halil; 3. Akmad Brahim; 4. Dan Asnawie; 5. Abunawas Maslamama; 6. Johari Abu; 7. Camid Gandamra Jr.; 8. Karwin Hamjani; 9. Kitem Kadatuan; 10. Michael Midtimbang; 11. Suraija Reina Hataman; 12. Ma-Arouph Candao; 13. Alindatu Pagayao; 14. Zulficar Ali Bayam; 15. Jaafar Apollo Mikhail Matalam; 16. Junalyn Sumlay; 17. Aldin Hadjirul Asiri; 18. Zaide Ali; 19. Abdulbassit Benito; 20. Mohammed Yusseef Paglas; 21. Quarish Langcap; 22. Juhair Toti; 23. Abdulmalik Lidasan; 24. Jurin Kasim; 25. Mohidin Usman; 26. Yasser Abdulkadir; 27. Fatima Kanakan; 28. Muslima Abdullah Guiapal; 29. Robina Kadir; 30. Norhasan Panulong; 31. Mandutong Sana Jumianjang Jr.; 32. Ibra Amaikurut; 33. Suwaib Musa; 34. Alyah Salik; 35. Farida Badal; 36. Bai Amirah Dumamba; 37. Mona Kasan; 38. Rohana Angkad; 39. Nor-Ain Alamada; 40. Bai Betty Pinguiaman
BARMM Grand Coalition	1. Mamintal Adiong III; 2. Amer Zaakaria Rakim; 3. Abdulrahman Rubbil Mangudadatu; 4. Datu Bimbo Sinsuat; 5. Hanie Ain Bud; 6. Abdel Razi Amin; 7. Sittie Aisah Pansar; 8. Amilbahar Mawallil; 9. Abdulgani Salapuddin; 10. Hadja Juliet Tammang; 11. Alirakim Munder; 12. Punduma Sani; 13. Marop Ampatuan; 14. Alyssa Nikael Tan; 15. Hanan Manabilang; 16. Faizal Padate; 17. Datu Ibrahim Sinsuat Jr.; 18. Adnan Biruar; 19. Al-Mashor Yasin; 20. Nurjay Sahali; 21. Alayssa Dimaampao; 22. Labimombao Dima-Macabando; 23. Bashier Manalao; 24. Nuriya Jamaldin; 25. Datu Ombra Sinsuat Jr.; 26. Soekarno Mohammad; 27. Rahib Payapat; 28. Khalid Lininding; 29. Nurziana Hamsan; 30. Mustapha Kabalu; 31. Erigene Tukuran; 32. Musa Diamla; 33. Jamar Jamiri; 34. Hamid Karon; 35. Armendra Lao; 36. Nurjaafar Kamuh; 37. Sheryll Yasmin Sangki; 38. Datunasser Rajamuda; 39. Arif Monaser Bualan; 40. Joannaliza Karon
Indigenous, Settler, Sama and Minorities Alliance Party	1. Abdulhussein Kashim; 2. Shastri Buddin; 3. Danny Sahi; 4. Mindalyn Abubakar; 5. Moh. Shan Abdulwahid; 6. Nafeesur Rahman Suhod; 7. Rabia Salapuddin; 8. Hadji Faizal Malande; 9. Putli Rhaiyan Maulana; 10. Jaman Pacunom; 11. Bangkola Sali; 12. Abdullah Suhod; 13. Jamael Salacop; 14. Acquil Banto
Mahardika Party	1. Nur-Ainee Lim; 2. Randolph Parcasio; 3. Abduljabbar Jialil; 4. Alongan Dimacaling; 5. Yahodza Simpal; 6. Alambai Buday; 7. Sakib Salajin; 8. Benbadar Sandag; 9. Suharto Adzis; 10. Samaon Mundas; 11. Asiah Lagawa; 12. Mustapha Abdulwahab; 13. Tony Musim; 14. Faisal Esmael; 15. Casim Sarip; 16. Salma Mala; 17. Ahmad-Ali Abdullah; 18. Ringcar Pinote; 19. Nabai Bandal; 20. Bilgadil Albani; 21. Cairoden Caderan; 22. Pompong Hadji Ali; 23. Abida Ali; 24. Ibrahim Abdulgani; 25. Al-Habson Antao; 26. Aspie Abdurahman; 27. Shirley Isnang; 28. Abdulwadud Abbas; 29. Moh. Kiblanzed Sharifa; 30. Hatima Kharid; 31. Tatabai Malang; 32. Alipikre Basher; 33. Franceria Abdulsalam; 34. Aisa Pacasirang; 35. Sitti Hajar Julhari; 36. Jamaluddin Abdullah; 37. Saada Tubing; 38. Aida Abdulla; 39. Umrah Wahab; 40. Naque Amad
Moro Ako Party	1. Farouk Macarambon Jr.; 2. Najeeb Taib; 3. Panarigan Salic Jr.; 4. Omar Masiding; 5. Johaena Marcom; 6. Borhanuddin Alcozbary II; 7. Najwajuhaynah Reem Hassan; 8. Azisa Hadji Ibrahim; 9. Ibrahim Guiamalon; 10. Mohammad Farhan Matua; 11. Noroden Aloyodan; 12. Samra Nanak; 13. Camal-Falih Sarangani; 14. Sarah Malatus; 15. Abdulrashid Dimnang; 16. Lina Andie; 17. Cabib Matabalao; 18. Johair Esmael; 19. Ronnel Sabandal; 20. Hanifah Athing; 21. Mamangilay Nanak; 22. Abdulfatah Ayonga; 23. Abdullah Pato; 24. Satar Lucman; 25. Saleha Pumbayabaya; 26. Rolaysa Ampoga; 27. Aminah Tocalo; 28. Jaime Succor; 29. Pahima Abdullah; 30. Sonaya Rakim; 31. Abdullah Angni; 32. Omensarah Salacob; 33. Nora Tocalo; 34. Jalainie Benito; 35. Sahara Yahya; 36. Norsida Sangca; 37. Noraisah Batua; 38. Farida Natangcop; 39. Guinaid Lundungan; 40. Amerhusien Dangcal
People's Consultative (Mushawara) Party	1. Alipikre Basher; 2. Fiat Macarambon; 3. Safrollah Marandang; 4. Gemma Ala; 5. Hamidullah Atar; 6. Wadja Malli; 7. Jasim Amate; 8. Sahron Roy Tamano; 9. Faisal Gunang; 10. Abdulrauf Lintang; 11. Ansary Domado; 12. Camid Mira-Ato Jr.; 13. Jamel Lomodag; 14. Khairodin Amerol; 15. Zinab Londo; 16. Mohammad Ali Pamanay; 17. Macacuna Gamor; 18. Badar Mangurun; 19. Isnaida Gampong; 20. Macasalong Moraki; 21. Sahary Saripada; 22. Mohammad Amerol; 23. Paisal Baute; 24. Mohamamad Muhazim Alioden; 25. Bohary Mangurun; 26. Rohanisah Pasandalan; 27. Moamar Hadji Acmad; 28. Guapar Alimoden; 29. Arianne Aba; 30. Norjana Molok; 31. Potre Aliah Mampay Malawani; 32. Saquera Guro; 33. Faysa Lawambai Usman; 34. Carlmichael Lantud; 35. Ibrajan Ala; 36. Princess Jaminah Usman; 37. Mohammad Datudacula; 38. Taher Assirong; 39. Adnan Ambor; 40. Saripia Magarang
Partido Bangon Bangsamoro	1. Nashrudin Kusain; 2. Omar Barangai; 3. Najib Hataman; 4. Murad Tuttuh; 5. Sani Alem Ansaroden; 6. Nasib Saronay; 7. Rahib Ali; 8. Mamad Mimbala Molia; 9. Al-Khalid Abdulmunap; 10. Josephine Unsi; 11. Abdulmanan Ampaso; 12. Jeffrey Ayunan; 13. Saad Hadjinoor; 14. Adham Kusain; 15. Taha Labuan; 16. Pendatun Sinsuat; 17. Aisa Abas; 18. Abdulcader Manda; 19. Martina Tagacay; 20. Sahi Jainal; 21. Agakhan Pangcatan; 22. Arsid Hajal; 23. Hamdy Balamula; 24. Naim Saddain; 25. Jane Antonnete Lidasan; 26. Jonathan Balodo; 27. Aguirre Dipatuana; 28. Zahira Abutazil; 29. Nur-Nazeerah Camliana; 30. Karen Camille Mae Sambolawan; 31. Jalil Cosain; 32. Maududi Campong; 33. Naga Dimasindel; 34. Asliyah Dimaporo; 35. Ashma Mamasainged; 36. Jamel Dinil; 37. Casmer Latip; 38. Baimhot Ibieta Gubat; 39. Ramil Abirin; 40. Alma Unsi-Abas
Progresibong Bangsamoro Party	1. Don Mustapha Loong; 2. Samilee Pianah; 3. Sitti Fatima Sali-Elias; 4. Abduljamil Ishmael; 5. Nasser Kadil; 6. Mahmud Bawasanta; 7. Laarnie Racman; 8. Mobrice Tupay; 9. Loderson Gustaham; 10. Fhairugs Guiamelon-Cadir; 11. Gerry Marrack; 12. Tony Ayunan; 13. Nasrudin Kamensa; 14. Lorna Rogong; 15. Samanudin Lungkatay; 16. Edgar Collado; 17. Datu Norkhan Ayunan; 18. Asra Utto; 19. Al-Shadikh Dais; 20. William Balios; 21. Jahani Abubakar; 22. Lucman Kamal; 23. Erna Madjiran; 24. Michael Dakal; 25. Mohmina Utto; 26. Rosemarie Flores; 27. Shajid Quituar; 28. Muamar Iddilis; 29. Montessa Montong; 30. Jocelyn Nul; 31. Dheli Saga; 32. Nashief Antam; 33. Liezel Irada; 34. Ryan Aldam; 35. Toks Guialal; 36. Sheila Manrique; 37. Rohamin Zacaria; 38. Suharto Iba; 39. Norma Yasin; 40. Nalang Kambuyut
Raayat Democratic Party	1. Jose Lorena; 2. Khalid Hadji Abdullah; 3. Baintan Ampatuan; 4. Sittie Fahanie Uy-Oyod; 5. Nasser Mustafa; 6. Datu Udtog Matalam IV; 7. Perfecto Garcia Jr.; 8. Schenette Druz Ali; 9. Madki Acbar; 10. Bofill Tuahan; 11. Yusop Ismael; 12. Amerhussien Acoon; 13. Emeliana Agregado; 14. Clenejean Salvador; 15. Fernando Cabugsa; 16. Yuhaima Macumbal; 17. William Baliacano; 18. Elenie Omar; 19. Irham Ma-Amar; 20. Esmail Lacsaman; 21. Nursiya Muksin; 22. Edgar Sagun; 23. Camar Ampuan; 24. Ibrahim Abubakar; 25. Jul-Amri Isahak; 26. Dimhal Ebing; 27. Richard Chudian; 28. Zia Sahani; 29. Charliemen Lipae; 30. Randy Francis Ramos; 31. Nur-Ahmad Jainuddin; 32. Lito Salapuddin; 33. Endria Hayal; 34. Saidamen Ali; 35. Aisa Abolais; 36. Norjannah Mangacop; 37. Masiding Toma; 38. Datu Shariff Hamin Adil; 39. Johaira Abedin; 40. Lailani Blanco
United Bangsamoro Justice Party	1. Murad Ebrahim; 2. Mohagher Iqbal; 3. Ali Solaiman; 4. Eduard Guerra; 5. Ali Ibrahim; 6. Said Salendab; 7. Mohammad Yacob; 8. Amir Balindong; 9. John Anthony Lim; 10. Haber Asarul; 11. Sha Elijah Dumama-Alba; 12. Nordjiana Dipatuan-Ducol; 13. Raissa Jajurie; 14. Said Shiek; 15. Ali Salik; 16. Abdulwahab Pak; 17. Akmad Abas; 18. Suharto Dimaporo; 19. Lanang Ali Jr.; 20. Shameera Matolo-Macaraig; 21. Abdullah Hashim; 22. Abdullah Macapaar; 23. Baileng Mantawil; 24. Muhammad Ameen Abbas; 25. Basit Abbas; 26. Matarul Estino; 27. Suharto Esmael; 28. Amiroddin Gayak; 29. Faiz Alauddin; 30. Nasroding Cornell; 31. Benjamin Loong; 32. Eddie Alih; 33. Norosalam Bago; 34. Muslima Asmawil; 35. Noraida Chio; 36. Juckra Abdulmalik; 37. Naima Pendi; 38. Abdulrahman Maneged; 39. Samaona Unda; 40. Shaimah Agasor
