= 2026 Bangsamoro Parliament election =

Autonomous regional election in the Philippines

- September 14, 2026

All 80 seats to the Bangsamoro Parliament 41 seats needed for a majority
- Registered: 2,393,202
- Turnout: 2,018,478; 84.36%

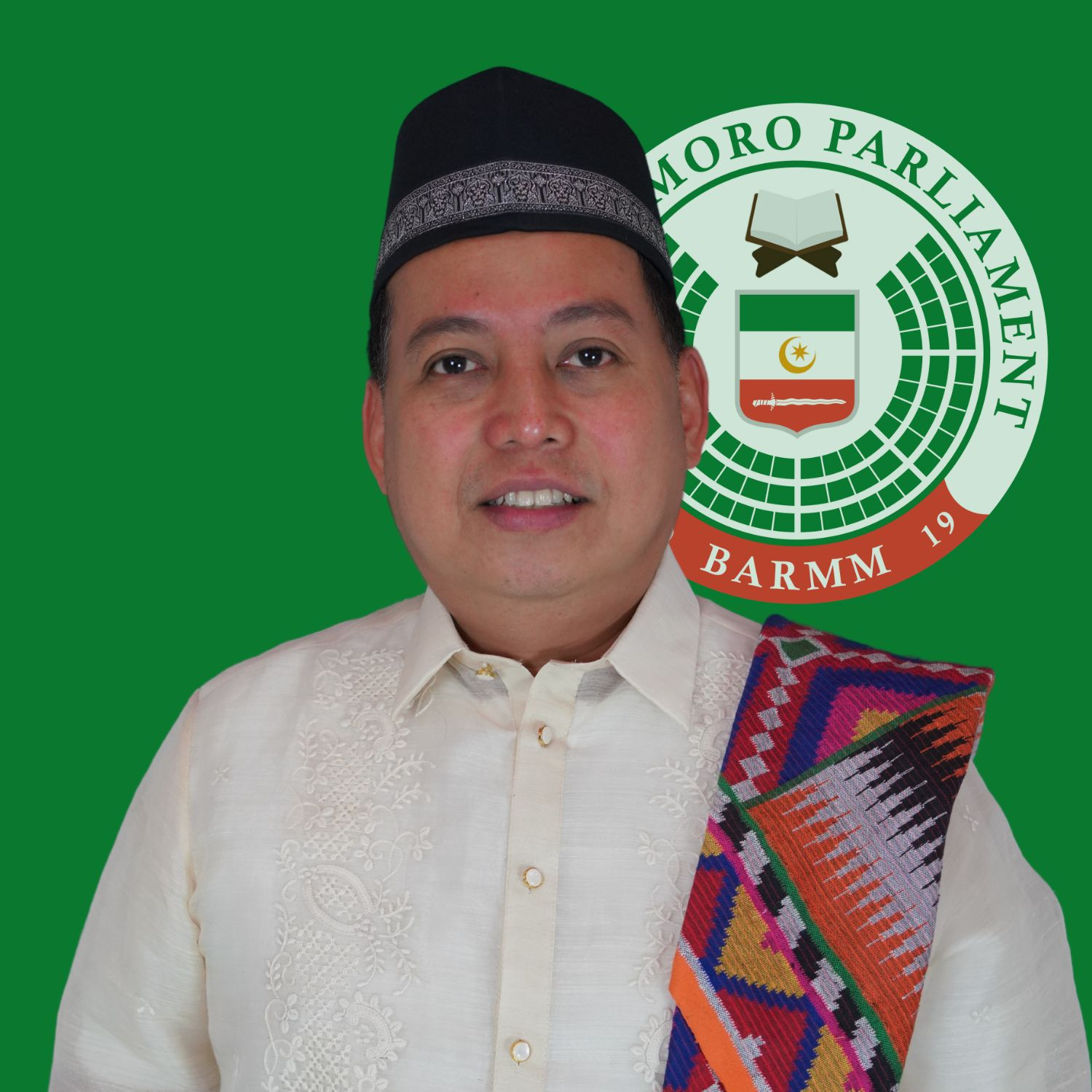
	First party	Second party	Third party
Leader	Abdulraof Macacua (Note: Abdulraof Macacua ran as an independent candidate.)	Murad Ebrahim	Abdulrahman Mangudadatu
Party	BFP	UBJP	BGC
Leader's seat	Maguindanao del Norte–3rd (Note: Abdulraof Macacua was an incumbent member of the Bangsamoro Transition Authority Parliament before the election.)	Ran in PR (won)	Ran in PR (won)
Seats won	31	30	15 (Note: Includes the seats for the Al Ittihad–UKB Party, the Bangsamoro Peoples Party and Serbisyong Inklusibo–Alyansang Progresibo.)
District vote	624,188 (Note: Includes the votes for Abdulraof Macacua, who ran in Maguindanao del Norte's 3rd district as an independent candidate.)	580,227	491,161 (Note: Includes the votes for the Al Ittihad–UKB Party, the Bangsamoro Peoples Party and Serbisyong Inklusibo–Alyansang Progresibo.)
Percentage	33.00%	30.67%	25.95%
Proportional vote	678,328	613,663	391,266
Percentage	35.86%	32.44%	20.68%
Sectoral vote	2,011,045	4,222,422	2,725,724
Percentage	20.86%	43.79%	28.27%
	Fourth party	Fifth party
Leader	Jose Lorena	Don Mustapha Loong
Party	Raayat	PRO Bangsamoro
Leader's seat	PR (Note: Jose Lorena was an incumbent member of the Bangsamoro Transition Authority Parliament before the election.)	PR (Note: Don Mustapha Loong was an incumbent member of the Bangsamoro Transition Authority Parliament before the election.) (lost)
Seats won	1	1
District vote	Did not contest	41,428
Percentage	—	2.19%
Proportional vote	68,839	36,672
Percentage	3.64%	1.94%
Sectoral vote	Did not contest	Did not contest
Percentage	—	—
- Results of district elections with Cotabato City on the inset; party proportional results are denoted by circles on the lower right corner
Government before election
Abdulraof Macacua
Independent (MILF nominee; BFP leader)
Government after election
Abdulraof Macacua
BFP

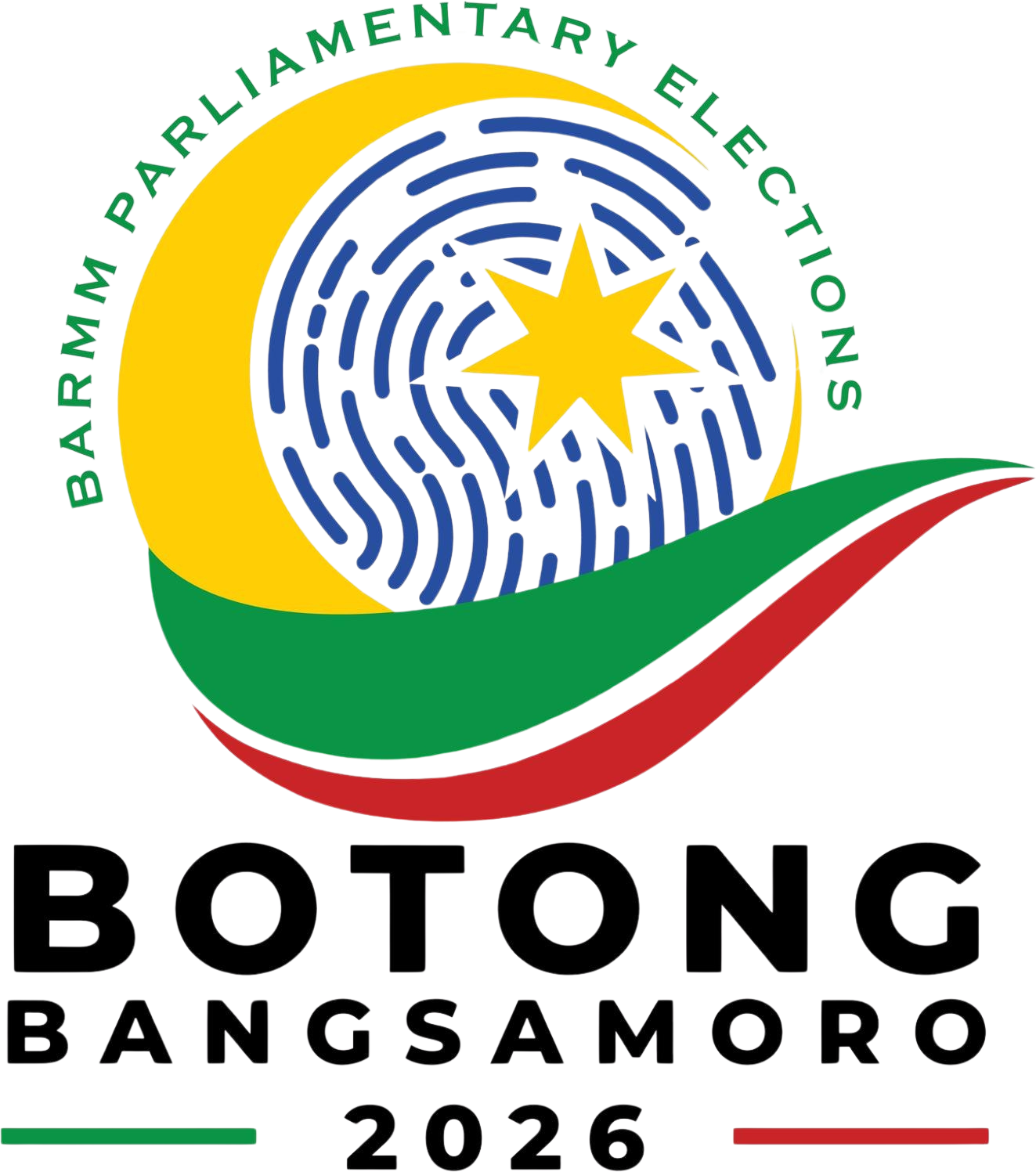
Logo of Botong Bangsamoro 2026, the official voter campaign launched by the Commission on Elections for the 2026 Bangsamoro Parliament election

Elections for the Bangsamoro Parliament were held on September 14, 2026, in the Bangsamoro Autonomous Region in Muslim Mindanao (BARMM) of the Philippines. All 80 members of parliament (MPs) were elected, comprising 40 party representatives, 32 district representatives, and eight sectoral representatives, including two seats reserved for Non-Moro Indigenous Peoples (NMIP) were filled through a separate traditional selection process. The election was held in accordance with the Bangsamoro Organic Law, which serves as the charter of the autonomous region. It was the first regular election for the Bangsamoro Parliament, succeeding the interim Bangsamoro Transition Authority Parliament.

Originally scheduled for May 2022, the election was postponed four times. It was first postponed to May 2025 due to the COVID-19 pandemic and the absence of an electoral code. It was moved again to October 2025 after the Supreme Court ruled that Sulu was not part of Bangsamoro, leaving seven seats unallocated. The election was moved for a third time to no later than March 31, 2026, after the Supreme Court declared two districting laws unconstitutional. It was postponed for the final time to September 14, 2026, after President Bongbong Marcos signed Republic Act No. 12317 on March 25, 2026, officially resetting the election date.

The elections resulted in a hung parliament, as no party or coalition was able to secure the 41 seats needed for a majority. The Bangsamoro Federalist Party (BFP), the party of incumbent Chief Minister Abdulraof Macacua, holds a one-seat plurality, having won 31 seats, followed by the United Bangsamoro Justice Party (UBJP) with 30. The Bangsamoro Grand Coalition (BGC), a coalition of four parties, won 15 seats, while the Raayat Democratic Party and Progresibong Bangsamoro Party each won a single seat.

== Background ==
=== Interim parliament ===
When Bangsamoro was formed in 2019, the Bangsamoro Transition Authority (BTA) served as an interim government of the autonomous region, and also acted as its interim parliament. The interim government is not officially divided by political party affiliation but instead into two groups according to the nominating entity; the majority are nominees of the Moro Islamic Liberation Front (MILF), while the rest are nominees of the Philippine national government.

Under the law which postponed the elections to 2025, the President of the Philippines was allowed to appoint a new set of members for the interim parliament whose terms would run until June 30, 2025.

Current Bangsamoro Transition Authority Parliament composition
Political group	Seats
Moro Islamic Liberation Front nominees	38 / 80
National Government nominees	38 / 80
Vacant	4 / 80

=== Initial postponement ===
Originally scheduled to be held on May 9, 2022, the Bangsamoro Parliament election was postponed. The impact of the COVID-19 pandemic in the region was cited as justification, along with the resulting non-passage of a Bangsamoro Electoral Code. The electoral code would be the regional legislation that would define the parliamentary districts for the purpose of the regional election. The electoral code would be legislated using data from the 2020 census which was likewise affected by the pandemic. In order for the election to be postponed, the Bangsamoro Organic Law had to be amended.

The Bangsamoro interim government and some advocacy groups in Mindanao campaigned for the postponement of the polls. Interim Chief Minister Murad Ebrahim reasoned that three years was not enough to restructure the region's government, and that the COVID-19 pandemic and delays in the release of the region's budget delayed the transition process. The postponement also received opposition. The Kusug Tausug party in the House of Representatives believed that postponing the elections was tantamount to justifying the interim Bangsamoro government's performance, which it found inadequate. Sulu Governor Abdusakur Mahail Tan also opposed the extension since he wanted elected officials to lead the region by 2022.

In the Congress, there was debate about whether it would be necessary to hold a plebiscite for the potential postponement of the Bangsamoro election. The National Citizens' Movement for Free Elections, amid talks on the possible postponement of the election, wanted the polls to be "desynchronized" or held on a different date from the national elections since a new electoral system would be used for the regional elections.

On September 6, 2021, the Senate approved Senate Bill No. 2214, postponing the election to 2025. A counterpart bill in the House of Representatives was approved on September 15. As the two bills were different, they had to be reconciled in a conference committee before being submitted for the president's signature to become law, and to actually postpone the election. While both bills gave the president of the Philippines the power to appoint parliament members for the 2019–2022 term, the House bill gave the incumbent president Rodrigo Duterte that power, while the Senate bill gave it to the winner of the 2022 presidential election. In late September, both chambers ratified the conference committee's version of the bill, giving the winning president in the 2022 election the power to appoint the members of the next transitional parliament.

On October 28, 2021, President Duterte signed into law the bill postponing the elections to 2025. However Duterte's successor was given the ability to change the parliament's entire composition once he or she assumed office.

=== Second interim parliament ===
Duterte's successor President Bongbong Marcos appointed new members for the interim parliament. Forty-nine were reappointed while 31 were new members. The composition of 41 MILF nominees and 39 government nominees was still retained.

=== Exclusion of Sulu from Bangsamoro and second postponement ===
In September 2024, Sulu province was excluded from Bangsamoro by a Supreme Court ruling, consequentially excluding it from the 2025 election. The ruling stated that its inclusion in the BARMM was unconstitutional as a majority of its residents voted against joining the region in the 2019 Bangsamoro autonomy plebiscite. The ruling led to uncertainty regarding the fate of seven seats allotted to Sulu in the Bangsamoro Parliament.

On October 22, 2024, the BTA adopted a resolution requesting the national Congress to move the election to 2028 on account of Sulu's exclusion from the BARMM. On November 4, 2024, Senate President Chiz Escudero filed Senate bill 2862, which called for the election to be postponed to May 11, 2026, in order for the BARMM "to reconfigure its jurisdictions as well as reallocate" its parliamentary seats following the exclusion of Sulu. A separate bill was also filed by Speaker Martin Romualdez and Lanao del Sur representative Zia Alonto Adiong in the House of Representatives to postpone the election until 2026.

A group of 35 civil society organizations in Mindanao opposed the postponement of the election and were also critical on the progress of decommissioning of the MILF as an armed rebel group. Maguindanao del Sur governor Mariam Mangudadatu said that there had been fatal skirmishes involving the MILF since 2022. The governor questioned MILF's legitimacy since their leadership in the transition government would be extended if the election was postponed. She also brought up a pledge by president Bongbong Marcos that the election would be held as planned in 2025.

The Bangsamoro regional government expressed openness to the postponement, stating that it was deferring to the "sound discretion" of the national Congress. Concerns were largely on the disenfranchisement of voters in Sulu, especially in the event the Supreme Court reversed its decision. Mohagher Iqbal of the MILF and also a parliament member was surprised by the initiative of the national congress. He believed that it would be advantageous to the United Bangsamoro Justice Party, the MILF's party, if the election was held as planned in 2025. On November 21, Basilan governor Hadjiman Hataman Salliman, Maguindanao del Norte Governor Abdulraof Macacua, and Tawi-Tawi Governor Yshmael Sali issued a joint statement supporting the postponement, citing the need to address the distribution of parliamentary seats following the exclusion of Sulu.

On February 16, 2025, COMELEC announced the suspension of ballot-printing for the election after a bicameral conference committee in Congress approved the postponement of the vote. On February 19, President Bongbong Marcos signed into law Republic Act No. 12123, officially moving the date of the election to October 13, 2025.

The COMELEC gave the Bangsamoro Parliament the ability to reallocate the seven parliamentary districts originally allocated for Sulu. The Parliament missed two deadlines; on May 30 and on June 15, 2025. COMELEC announced that only 73 out of 80 parliamentary seats would be filled.

=== Third postponement ===
On September 15, 2025, the Supreme Court, acting on an petition filed by Bangsamoro MP Lanang Ali Jr., League of Bangsamoro Organizations Secretary General Samsodin Amella, and peace advocate Datuan Magon Jr., issued a temporary restraining order against the Bangsomoro Autonomy Act (BAA) No. 77, or the Bangsamoro Parliamentary Redistricting Act of 2025, which sought to implement the reallocation of parliamentary districts, prompting the COMELEC to suspend its preparations for the election on September 17. On September 25, COMELEC Chair George Garcia said it was "legally and factually impossible" to hold the election as scheduled, citing the TRO by the Supreme Court.

Supreme Court of the Philippines invalidates the Bangsamoro Parliament Districting

On October 1, 2025, the Supreme Court declared the BAA 77 as well as the preceding BAA 58 unconstitutional, leaving Bangsamoro without a law defining its parliamentary districts and effectively postponing the elections again. The high court nevertheless directed the COMELEC to proceed with preparations and conduct of the election not later than March 31, 2026. The court ordered the parliament to determine the distribution of district parliamentary seats by October 30, 2025.

After the Bangsamoro Parliament failed to comply with the first COMELEC deadline, the election body warned that the parliament should pass a new districting law by November 30, 2025. As per the interpretation of the COMELEC, the parliament should pass the districting law by this date to comply the Voters' Registration Act which states that no law modifying electoral districts shall be passed 120 days before the elections – one of the cited reasons why the Supreme Court declared BAA 77 as unconstitutional.

On November 25, 2025, the COMELEC set the election date for March 30, 2026.

The Bangsamoro Parliament still failed to pass a districting law after it held its last regular session for the year on December 18, 2025. On December 22, the COMELEC has already urged Congress to pass a law to set the elections for November 2026.

Chief Minister Abdulraof Macacua called for a special session to be held from December 29 to 31, 2025 in a bid to pass a districting law. The special session took place as Mohammad Yacob decided against convening the parliament as its members were expected to be unavailable due to the Christmas holiday.

A special session began on January 12, 2026, with Parliament Bill 415 being passed minutes after midnight of the following day. However the Institute for Autonomy and Governance and COMELEC raised concerns that the new districting law had already missed the deadline to be compliant with the 120-days requirement set by the Voters' Registration Act.

=== Fourth postponement ===
On January 28, 2026, the COMELEC announced the deferment of the election, citing the 120-day deadline. Senator Migz Zubiri subsequently filed Senate Bill 1823, which sought to hold the election on September 14, 2026. On March 25, 2026, President Bongbong Marcos signed the bill into law. Signed as Republic Act No. 12317, the law resets the date of the first regular Bangsamoro Parliament election to September 14, 2026. It ensures that future elections will be synchronized with the Philippines' national and local election schedules. The law amended Section 13, Article XVI of the Bangsamoro Organic Law to reflect the new election date after multiple postponements.

== Electoral system ==
1. Political parties (40 seats) (50.0%)
2. Single member districts (32 seats) (40.0%)
3. Sectoral representatives (8 seats) (10.0%)

Sample ballot paper for voters in the Cotabato City 1st district which shows the logos of the parties for the proportional representation section, and photos of candidates for the district representative candidates.

A total of 80 seats were contested in the 2026 Bangsamoro elections. The final composition of the parliament after the elections should satisfy the following:

- One half (40 seats) shall be representatives of political parties elected through a system of proportional representation.
- Not more than 40 percent (32 seats) of the members of the parliament shall be elected from single member districts.
- Reserved seats and sectoral representatives shall constitute at least 10 percent, which in any case should be no less than 8 seats.

This means a voter has three votes of parallel voting; the vote on one does not affect the other two. A party may opt to participate in one, two or all three votes. Independents can only participate in district elections.

Ballots for the election included candidates' photos and the official logos of political parties. This is the first time that such visual aids were added on ballots for an elections in the Philippines.

=== Proportional representation ===
A voter may opt to vote in the proportional representation ballot question. This is voted upon by the region at-large. The electoral threshold is at 2.5%.

=== Districts ===
The Bangsamoro parliamentary districts were initially defined on February 28, 2024, via Bangsamoro Act No. 58, and on August 19, 2025, via Bangsamoro Act No. 77. The two acts were then declared unconstitutional by the Supreme Court, and a replacement law, which was later known as the Bangsamoro Act No. 86, provided for the current scope of the regional parliamentary districts.

The parliamentary districts exist independently from the congressional districts used to determine representation in the national House of Representatives.

Constituency	Number of seats		
Constituency	BAA No. 58 (2024) (declared unconstitutional)	BAA No. 77 (2025) (declared unconstitutional)	BAA No. 86 (2026) (current)
Basilan	3	4	
Lanao del Sur	8	9	
Maguindanao del Norte	4	5	
Maguindanao del Sur	4	5	
Sulu	7	— (Note: Not for contention after Sulu's exclusion in September 2024)	
Tawi-Tawi	3	4	
Cotabato City	2	3	
Special Geographic Area	1	2	

=== Sectoral representation ===
The following is the distribution for the sectoral representatives seats:

Sector	Seats
Non-Moro Indigenous Peoples (NMIP)	2
Settler communities	2
Traditional leaders	1
Women	1
Ulama	1
Youth	1
Total	8

The NMIPs, Traditional leaders, and 'Ulama representatives were supposed be elected in their own convention/assembly separate from the parliamentary elections. The names of the elected representatives should be submitted to the Commission on Elections seven days prior to the parliamentary elections and would be proclaimed simultaneously with the rest of the elected members of parliament.

Ultimately, the entire region voted at-large for sectoral seats, except for the NMIP seat, which was determined via convention a few weeks prior to the election. Voting system is first-past-the-post voting for all other sectors, except for settler communities, which is via plurality block voting. A voter may opt to vote for all sectors, even on ones the voter is not a part of (i.e., a Christian male settler senior citizen may opt to vote for the ballot question for women, traditional leaders, youth and Ulama).

== Calendar ==
=== Original timetable ===
Activity	Start	End
Publication of the implementing rules and regulations (IRR) of the Bangsamoro Electoral Code (Bangsamoro Autonomy Act 35)	April 17, 2024	
Filing of petition for registration of regional parliament political parties and regional parliament sectoral organizations	May 15, 2024	July 1, 2024 (extended from June 7, 2024)
Submission of Sworn Information Update Statement (SIUS) to the Political Finance and Affairs Department (PFAD) and filing of registration or accreditation of a coalition	August 15, 2024 (deadline)	
Submission of Manifestation of Intent to Participate in the Parliamentary Election of party representatives	August 30, 2024 (deadline)	
Election day	October 13, 2025	

The period for the filing of candidacies in the election was initially scheduled from October 1–8, 2024. However, the Commission on Elections subsequently moved the date to November 4–9, 2024 due to the exclusion of Sulu from the BARMM by the Supreme Court.

=== Current timetable ===
Activity	Start	End
Filing of certificates of candidacy for district representativespolitical parties	May 5, 2026	May 7, 2026
Filing of lists of nominees and acceptance of nomination of regional parliamentary	May 5, 2026	May 7, 2026
Election period	July 16, 2026 (start)	
Campaign period	July 30, 2026	September 12, 2026
Election day	September 14, 2026	

== Parties ==
=== Background ===
When the United Bangsamoro Justice Party (UBJP) was asked in May 2021 if they would participate in the not-yet-postponed Bangsamoro elections, they said that they were "ready" but expressed preference that "there would be no election yet", so that they would keep focused on "the delivery of basic services" to residents of Bangsamoro. The UBJP is an affiliate of the Moro Islamic Liberation Front, whose nominees form the majority of the Bangsamoro Transition Authority Parliament.

On April 24, 2024, the Bangsamoro Peoples Party (BPP), the Al Ittihad–UKB Party and the Serbisyong Inklusibo–Alyansang Progresibo (SIAP) formed an electoral alliance for the 2025 election.

Eligible parties should have at least 10,000 members with chapters throughout the Bangsamoro region. This prerequisite remains despite Sulu's exclusion from Bangsamoro in September 2024.

=== Contesting parties ===
Eight parties have registered with the Commission on Elections as of March 2024. On May 18, 2024, Sulu governor Abdusakur Mahail Tan announced that he would forego another term as governor in the 2025 local election and challenge Murad Ebrahim as Chief Minister during a rally in Maimbung. He received support from the BARMM Grand Coalition (BGC). However, Tan became ineligible to run for chief minister following the Supreme Court decision excluding Sulu from the BARMM on September 9, 2024.

Sixteen political groups sought accreditation for the purpose of parliamentary election. The BGC registered as a regional party and not as a coalition, although two of its members, Al Ittihad–UKB and SIAP also sought separate accreditations. As of November 5, 2024, there are eight accredited regional parties, including the BGC.

In March 2026, the COMELEC asked all accredited parties to register again after their certifications were nullified by Bangsamoro Autonomy Act No. 88. Sixteen political groups has filed applications by the April 6, 2026 deadline. 13 parties were part of the tentative list of parties published on May 13, 2026.

COMELEC cancelled the accreditation of Moro Ako Party as a regional party over alleged misrepresentation on August 4, 2026. The petition alleged that Moro Ako declared non-existent chapters but the party insisted that the offices do exist and there were only "typographical errors". COMELEC denied the motion for reconsideration by the party of August 28. COMELEC also disqualified Anwar Alamada, the UBJP's candidate for the fifth parliamentary district of Maguindanao del Sur, after the Bangsamoro Federalist Party (BFP) candidate Rafsanjani Ali accused Alamada of falsely declaring that he was a long-time resident of the area.

Contesting parties in the 2026 Bangsamoro Parliament election
Name		Affiliation/s	Seats vying						
Name		Affiliation/s	PR	FPTP	Settler	Women	Youth	Ulama	TL
Al Ittihad–UKB Party	Itihad	BARMM Grand Coalition	No	Yes	No	No	No	No	No
Alliance of Bangsamoro Tri-Peoples Party	ABoT		Yes	No	No	No	No	No	No
Bangsamoro Party (Note: Includes the Bangsamoro Party–Women.)	BaPA	Moro National Liberation Front	Yes	Yes	No	Yes	No	No	No
Bangsamoro Peoples Party	BPP	BARMM Grand Coalition	No	Yes	No	No	No	No	No
Bangsamoro Empowerment and Social Transformation Party	BEST		Yes	Yes	No	No	No	No	No
Bangsamoro Federalist Party (Note: Including the Bangsamoro Federalist Party's Settler Communities Sectoral Wing, Women Sectoral Wing, Youth Sectoral Wing, Ulama Sectoral Wing and Traditional Leaders Sectoral Wing.)	BFP	Partido Federal ng Pilipinas	Yes	Yes	Yes	Yes	Yes	Yes	Yes
BARMM Grand Coalition (Note: Including the BARMM Grand Coalition–Youth Sectoral Wing and the Bangsamoro Grand Coalition–Traditional Leaders Sectoral Wing.)	BGC	BARMM Grand Coalition	Yes	Yes	Yes	Yes	Yes	Yes	Yes
Christians Settler for Peace	C4P		No	No	Yes	No	No	No	No
Datu sa Kabuntalan (Matampay) sa Magindanaw Royal Descendants Association	Royals		No	No	No	No	No	No	Yes
Dungon Traditional Leaders Organization	DTLO		No	No	No	No	No	No	Yes
Indigenous, Settlers, Sama and Minorities Alliance Party	ISAMA		Yes	No	No	No	No	No	No
Iranun Sultanate's League of the Philippines, Inc.	ISLPI		No	No	No	No	No	No	Yes
League of Bangsamoro Islamic Advocate Associate	LBIAA		No	No	No	Yes	No	No	No
Mahardika Party	MP	Moro National Liberation Front	Yes	Yes	No	No	No	No	No
People's Consultative (Mushawara) Party	Mushawara		Yes	No	No	No	No	No	No
Partido Bangon Bangsamoro	PBB		Yes	No	No	No	No	No	No
Progresibong Bangsamoro Party	PRO BM		Yes	Yes	No	No	No	No	No
Raayat Democratic Party	Raayat		Yes	No	No	No	No	No	No
Royal House of the Sultanate of Marawi	RHSUMA		No	No	No	No	No	No	Yes
Royal House of the Sultanate of Pagayawan	RHSUPA		No	No	No	No	No	No	Yes
Royal Sultanate of Eastern Unayan	RSEU		No	No	No	No	No	No	Yes
Royal Sultanate of Langkong	RSL		No	No	No	No	No	No	Yes
Serbisyong Inklusibo–Alyansang Progresibo	SIAP	BARMM Grand Coalition	No	Yes	No	No	No	No	No
Tawi-Tawi Provincial Women's Council Inc.	TPWC		No	No	No	Yes	No	No	No
United Bangsamoro Justice Party (Note: Including the United Bangsamoro Justice Party's Settler Communities Sectoral Wing, Women Sectoral Wing, Youth Sectoral Wing, Ulama Sectoral Wing and Traditional Leaders Sectoral Wing.)	UBJP	Moro Islamic Liberation Front	Yes	Yes	Yes	Yes	Yes	Yes	Yes
Independent			—N/a	Yes	No	No	No	No	No

== Retiring incumbents ==
The following members of the 2nd Bangsamoro Transition Authority Parliament did not run in the election:

Name	Nominated by
Haron Abas (Note: Haron Abas died on June 28, 2026.)	MILF
Mudjib Abu	MILF
Laisa Alamia	National Government
Mosber Alauddin	MILF
Suharto Ambolodto	National Government
Mohammad Kelie Antao	National Government
Uttoh Salem Cutan	National Government
Hashemi Dilangalen	National Government
Rasul Ismael	National Government
Saripuddin Jikiri	National Government
Bai Ali Karon	National Government
Abdullah Makapaar	MILF
Froilyn Mendoza	National Government
Abdulkarim Misuari	National Government
Nurredha Misuari	National Government
Rasol Mitmug Jr.	National Government
Hussein Muñoz	MILF
Ubaida Pacasem	MILF
Ramon Piang Sr.	MILF
Paisalin Tago	National Government
Nabil Tan	National Government
Adzfar Usman	National Government

== Elections ==
=== Sectoral representatives ===
Additionally, eight seats are reserved for sectoral representatives namely women, youth, non-Moro indigenous peoples (NMIP), settler communities, Ulama, and traditional leaders Originally accredited organizations representing each group were to hold assemblies to determine their respective representatives.

However, Bangsamoro Act No. 88 was passed amending the Bangsamoro Election Code. The representatives for each sectoral group except the NMIPs should be held on the same election day through a plurality of valid votes by the electorate. Eligible voters do not have to belong to a certain sector. This means that both men and women can vote for the women sector representative.

==== Non-Moro Indigenous Peoples ====
The COMELEC set July 27 to August 9, 2026, as the period where Non-Moro Indigenous People (NMIP) communities were to conduct their tribal assemblies and August 24 to September 4 as the period for Regional Inter-Tribal Convention to select the two representatives.

On August 26, 2026, during the Regional Inter-Tribal Convention at the Pagana Convention Center in Cotabato City, the NMIPs chose two representatives for the Bangsamoro Parliament. Six tribes were present during the convention, namely the Limbubungan Higaonon, Erumanen ne Menuvu, Blaan, Dulangan Manobo, Lambiangan, and Teduray. Each of the six groups proposed two potential members of parliament and nominated ten members to the convention.

The delegates have decided the order of representation for the six tribes. For the 2026 elections, they agree that the representatives should come from the Teduray and the Lambiangan. The next representatives in the immediate elections after 2026 will be selected from the Manobo Dulangan and Erumanen ne Menuvu, and then after the Blaan and Higaonon. The Teduray and the Lambiangan will then get their turn again.

The Bangsamoro Electoral Code requires half of the NMIP representatives with two allocated seats to be women. The male nominee was Leticio Datuwata of the Lambiangan while the female nominee was Jo Genna Jover of the Teduray.

==== Traditional leaders ====
The traditional leaders sector represents the royal sultanates and houses in Bangsamoro. The following institutions were explicitly named in Section 31 of the Bangsamoro Electoral Code.

- Sulu Sultanate (Note: Still considered relevant by the Bangsamoro Commission for the Preservation of Cultural Heritage Resolution No. 1 of 2025, despite the Supreme Court ruling excluding Sulu province from Bangsamoro in 2024.)
- Maguindanao, Kabuntalan, and Buayan
- Royal House of Ranao
- Royal House of Iranun

The Intra-Sultanate Assembly was originally intended to determine the rotational order for the four groups from which the traditional leader sectoral representative would be selected. Under the original guidelines, the Sultanates of Maguindanao, Kabuntalan, and Buayan were treated as a single cluster and were to determine their own internal rotation. However, Bangsamoro Autonomy Act No. 88 subsequently scrapped this arrangement, providing instead for the traditional leader sectoral representative to be elected by the electorate through plurality voting on election day.

== Awareness ==
The Institute for Autonomy and Governance (IAG) conducted a survey between January 27 and February 15, 2025, asking 2,688 likely voters. Almost half or 47.3% admitted they were completely unaware of how Bangsamoro region's voting process actually works.

== Security concerns ==
=== Gun ban and other measures ===
A gun ban went into effect in Bangsamoro on August 14, 2025, coinciding with the election period, and will last until October 28, 2025. This also applies to Isabela in Basilan, despite the city itself not being part of Bangsamoro. On September 11, 2025, COMELEC placed 12 municipalities in the Bangsamoro under its red areas of concern due to a history of conflict and violence. These included six towns in Lanao del Sur (Masiu, Lumba-Bayabao, Poona Bayabao, Tamparan, Taraka and Mulondo), five in Maguindanao del Sur (Paglat, Pandag, Buluan, Datu Paglas and Mangudadatu), and Al-Barka in Basilan. Following the Supreme Court's ruling voiding Bangsamoro Autonomy Acts No. 77 and 58, COMELEC said that it would lift all election-related security measures.

After the election was rescheduled to September 2026, a new gun ban went into effect on July 16, 2026, and will last until September 29, 2026. By August 24, at least 15 people were arrested for violating the ban, while 20 firearms were seized. More than 24,000 security checkpoints were set up across the region, while around 30,000 security personnel were deployed.

At least 108 international observers from 16 organizations and diplomatic delegations have attended to watch the proceedings of the Bangsamoro election.

=== Incidents ===
On August 14, a convoy carrying interim BARMM Chief Minister Abdulraof Macacua was fired upon by unidentified assailants in Datu Odin Sinsuat, Maguindanao del Norte as he was returning from Kabuntalan, where he had assumed the leadership of the Bangsamoro Federalist Party. No injuries were recorded.

On September 11, gunmen opened fire on the residence of Rima Hassan, the BFP candidate for the Lamitan constituency in Basilan, injuring two people including her son-in-law.

Overnight on September 13–14, clashes broke out among rival supporters of the UBJP and BFP queuing in advance at a school being used as a polling precinct in Cotabato City, leaving three dead and 15 injured. In another incident in the city, gunmen opened fire on a group of UBJP supporters, with no injuries reported, while in a third incident, one person was critically injured in an explosion. The incidents prompted the imposition of COMELEC control in the city as well as in Maluso in Basilan, following the discovery of 16,000 pre-shaded ballot papers that affected 36 of 38 polling stations in the municipality. Voting in affected areas in Maluso began on September 15 after the compromised ballots were replaced.

On election day, clashes broke out again between voters at another polling station in Cotabato City, leaving three people injured including a police officer. In the town of Shariff Saydona Mustapha in Maguindanao del Sur, clashes broke out again between supporters of rival parties at a polling station which escalated into a shootout that involved a unit of the MILF and damaged the municipal hall. Two people, including a member of the PNP Special Action Force, were injured, while 10 others were arrested.

== Debate ==
A debate was held at the Cardinal Quevedo Gym at Notre Dame University in Cotabato City on August 27, 2026. Thirteen participants representing their respective political parties or groups took part in the debate.

Participants of the First BARMM Parliamentary Elections Debates
No.	Party	Name	Candidacy
1	ABoT	Emran Mohammad	Party 2nd nominee
2	BaPA	Omar Crisostomo Sema	Party 1st nominee
3	BEST	Al-Rashid Balt	Party 1st nominee
4	BFP	Naguib Sinarimbo	Cotabato City's 2nd district
5	BGC	Amir Mawallil	Party 8th nominee
6	ISAMA	Abdulhussein Kashim	Party 1st nominee
7	Mahardika	Nur-Ainee Tan Lim	Party 1st nominee
8	Moro Ako	Najeeb Taib	Party 2nd nominee
9	Mushawara	Alipikre Basher	Party 1st nominee
10	PBB	Addie Unsi	—
11	PRO BM	Don Mustapha Loong	Party 1st nominee
12	Raayat	Jose Lorena	Party 1st nominee
13	UBJP	Sha Elijah Dumama-Alba	Party 11th nominee

== Results ==
=== Summary ===
Thirty of the eighty elected members of parliament are incumbent members of the preceding second interim parliament while eight are returning members. The elected candidates will start their term on October 30, 2026.

Party or alliance		Proportional			District			Sectoral			Total seats
Party or alliance		Votes	%	Seats	Votes	%	Seats	Votes	%	Seats	Total seats
Bangsamoro Federalist Party (Note: Includes the votes for Abdulraof Macacua, who ran in Maguindanao del Norte's 3rd district as an independent candidate.)		678,328	35.86	16	624,188	33.00	15	2,011,045	20.86	0	31
United Bangsamoro Justice Party		613,663	32.44	15	580,227	30.67	9	4,222,422	43.79	6	30
BARMM Grand Coalition	BARMM Grand Coalition	391,266	20.68	8	22,939	1.21	0	2,725,724	28.27	0	8
BARMM Grand Coalition	Serbisyong Inklusibo–Alyansang Progresibo				345,506	18.26	6				6
BARMM Grand Coalition	Al Ittihad–UKB Party				74,584	3.94	1				1
BARMM Grand Coalition	Bangsamoro Peoples Party				48,132	2.54	0				0
BARMM Grand Coalition	Total	391,266	20.68	8	491,161	25.96	7	2,725,724	28.27	0	15
Raayat Democratic Party		68,839	3.64	1							1
Progresibong Bangsamoro Party		36,672	1.94	0	41,428	2.19	1				1
Bangsamoro Party		35,777	1.89	0	53,618	2.83	0	22,919	0.24	0	0
BEST Party		26,926	1.42	0	2,704	0.14	0				0
Mahardika Party		14,800	0.78	0	8,676	0.46	0				0
Alliance of Bangsamoro Tri-Peoples Party		11,428	0.60	0							0
Mushawara Party		8,054	0.43	0							0
ISAMA Party		3,312	0.18	0							0
Partido Bangon Bangsamoro		2,594	0.14	0							0
Iranun Sultanates League of the Philippines								224,459	2.33	0	0
The Royal House of the Sultanate of Marawi								123,166	1.28	0	0
Christians Settler for Peace								113,363	1.18	0	0
Tawi-Tawi Provincial Women's Council								106,142	1.10	0	0
Dungon Traditional Leaders Organization								58,878	0.61	0	0
Datu sa Kabuntalan sa Magindanaw Royal Descendants Association								11,045	0.11	0	0
League of Bangsamoro Islamic Advocate Associate								9,249	0.10	0	0
Royal Sultanate of Langkong								7,082	0.07	0	0
Royal Sultanate of Eastern Unayan								6,841	0.07	0	0
Independent					89,758	4.74	0				0
Non-Moro Indigenous Peoples seats										2	2
Total		1,891,659	100.00	40	1,891,760	100.00	32	9,642,335	100.00	8	80
Valid votes		1,891,659	93.72		1,891,760	93.72					
Invalid/blank votes (Note: Includes 16,752 proportional votes for Moro Ako Party, which was disqualified.)		126,819	6.28		126,718	6.28					
Total votes		2,018,478	100.00		2,018,478	100.00		2,018,478	–		
Registered voters/turnout		2,393,202	84.34		2,393,202	84.34		2,393,202	84.34		
Source: Commission on Elections (votes), GMA News (proportional and sectoral seats), Philippine News Agency (district seats and turnout)

=== Proclamation ===
All thirty-two parliamentary district representatives were formally proclaimed on September 15.

After midnight on September 16, the COMELEC Regional Board of Canvassers formally proclaimed all the elected members of the parliament. The BFP, UBJP, BGC, and Raayat Democratic Party secured all forty seats for political party representation. Moreover, the UBJP likewise secured all six sectoral seats. Since none of the contesting parties managed to win the required 41-seat majority, this may result to a possible hung parliament.

== Aftermath ==
The first regular Bangsamoro Parliament convened on October 30, 2026, with 79 out of 80 members present. There were two candidates for the position of Chief Minister: Kitem Kadatuan nominated Abdulraof Macacua of the BFP while Mohagher Iqbal nominated Murad Ebrahim. Ishak Mastura served as the temporary presiding officer for the process of electing the chief minister.

Macacua won the election within the parliament, garnering 51 votes with his rival Ebrahim securing 27 votes. One member present abstained.

== Defeated incumbents ==
Name	Nominated as interim MP by	Party	Contested in
Akmad Abas	MILF	UBJP	Proportional (17th nominee)
Basit Abbas	MILF	UBJP	Proportional (25th nominee)
Lanang Ali Jr.	MILF	UBJP	Proportional (19th nominee)
Baintan Ampatuan	National Government	Raayat	Proportional (3rd nominee)
Susana Anayatin	National Government	BFP	Settler Communities
Abdulbasit Benito	MILF	BFP	Proportional (19th nominee)
Suharto Esmael	MILF	UBJP	Proportional (27th nominee)
Matarul Estino	MILF	UBJP	Proportional (26th nominee)
Amirodddin Gayak	MILF	UBJP	Proportional (28th nominee)
Khalid Hadji Abdullah	National Government	Raayat	Proportional (2nd nominee)
Abdullah Hashim	MILF	UBJP	Proportional (21st nominee)
Hatimil Hassan	National Government	BAPA	Proportional (4th nominee)
Faizal Karon	National Government	BAPA	Proportional (7th nominee)
Benjamin Loong	MILF	UBJP	Proportional (31st nominee)
Don Mustapha Loong	National Government	PROBM	Proportional (1st nominee)
Butch Malang	MILF	BFP	Special Geographic Area's 1st district
Baileng Mantawil	MILF	UBJP	Proportional (23rd nominee)
Alirakim Munder	National Government	BGC	Proportional (11th nominee)
Abdulwahab Pak	MILF	UBJP	Proportional (16th nominee)
Randolph Parcasio	National Government	Mahardika	Proportional (2nd nominee)
Omar Yasser Sema	National Government	BAPA	Proportional (1st nominee)
Romeo Sema	National Government	Mahardika	Cotabato City's 1st district
Kadil Sinolinding Jr.	MILF	Independent	Special Geographic Area's 2nd district
Amenodin Sumagayan	National Government	SIAP	Lanao del Sur's 4th district
Sittie Fahanie Uy-Oyod	National Government	Raayat	Proportional (4th nominee)
