= Tamparan =

Municipality in Lanao del Sur, Philippines

Tamparan تامفاران
- Municipality
- Municipality of Tamparan
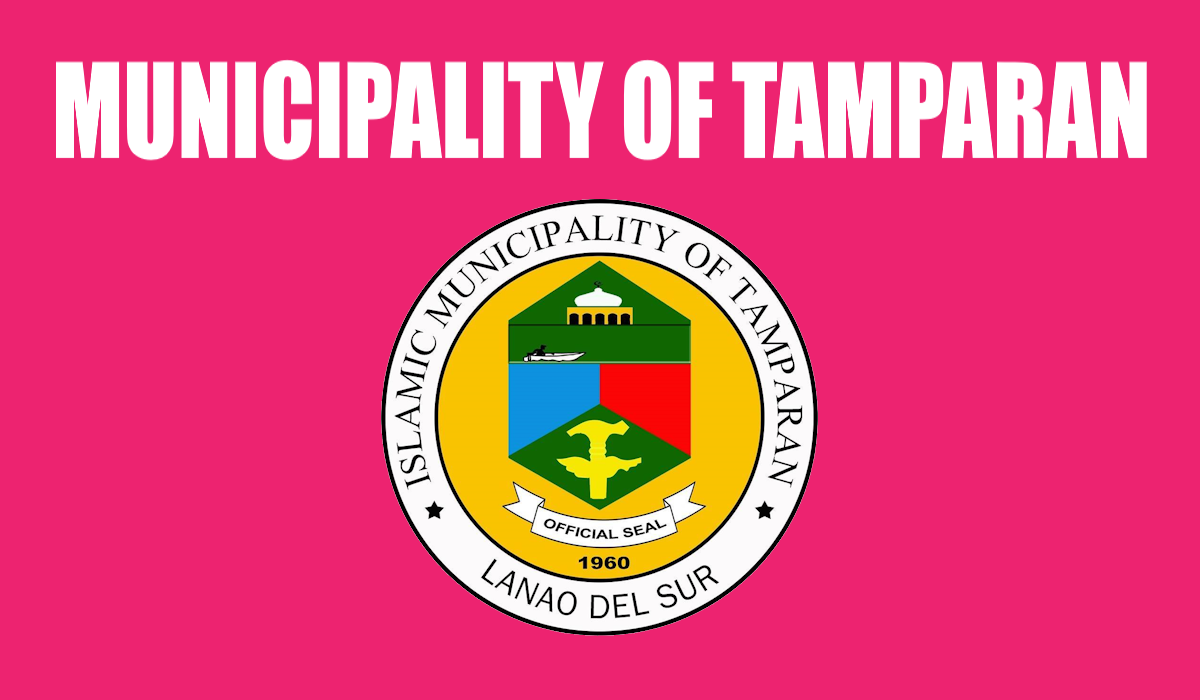
- Flag Seal

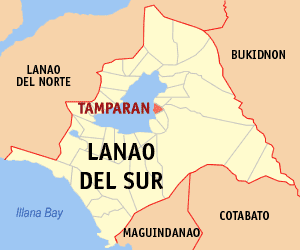
- Map of Lanao del Sur with Tamparan highlighted
- Interactive map of Tamparan
- Location within the Philippines
- Coordinates: 7°52′39″N 124°19′31″E
- Country: Philippines
- Region: Bangsamoro Autonomous Region in Muslim Mindanao
- Province: Lanao del Sur
- House district: 1st district
- Parliamentary district: 4th district
- Barangays: 44 (see Barangays)

Government Municipality of Tamparan | (DILG)
  - Type: Sangguniang Bayan
  - Mayor: Mohammad Juhar D. Disomimba
  - Vice Mayor: Alinor D. Tomawis
  - House Representative: Ansaruddin Abdul Malik A. Adiong
  - Electorate: 19,336 voters (2025)

Area
  - Total: 170.00 km^{2} (65.64 sq mi)
- Elevation: 703 m (2,306 ft)
- Highest elevation: 898 m (2,946 ft)
- Lowest elevation: 696 m (2,283 ft)

Population (2024 census)
  - Total: 37,190
  - Density: 218.8/km^{2} (566.6/sq mi)
  - Households: 4,738

Economy
  - Income class: 3rd municipal income class
  - Poverty incidence: 17.8% (2023)
  - Revenue: ₱ 166.4 million (2024)
  - Assets: ₱ 44.03 million (2024)
  - Expenditure: ₱ 166.4 million (2024)
  - Liabilities: ₱ 1.127 million (2022, 2023, 2024)

Service provider
  - Electricity: Lanao del Sur Electric Cooperative (LASURECO)
- Time zone: UTC+8 (PST)
- ZIP code: 9704
- PSGC: 1903626000
- IDD : area code: +63 (0)63
- Native languages: Maranao; Tagalog
- Website: www.tamparan-lds.gov.ph

Tamparan, officially the Islamic Municipality of Tamparan (Maranao: Inged a Tamparan; Tagalog: Bayan ng Tamparan), is a municipality in the province of Lanao del Sur, Philippines. According to the 2024 census, it has a population of 37,190 people.

== History ==
Its name was derived from the Maranao word tamparan which literally means "frontage".

In 1940 President Manuel L. Quezon issued Commonwealth Act No. 592 creating Dansalan (now Marawi) as a regular municipality and Tamparan as its municipal district covering the areas (now municipalities) of Masiu, Taraka, Poona-Bayabao, Lumba Bayabao, Maguing, Mulondo, Bumbaran and Wao.

During World War II, the Battle of Tamparan occurred on September 12, 1942, when a group of 90 Japanese soldiers pursuing Meranaw guerrilla Datu Busran Kalaw arrived at the town on the first day of Ramadan and shelled a fort. Enraged at such transgressions on a religious holiday, locals from Tamparan and nearby settlements assaulted the Japanese using bladed farm implements, killing all but five of the Japanese soldiers, but with 200 to 300 casualties among the residents.

Tamparan District became a regular municipality on September 28, 1960, by virtue of Executive Order No. 405 and consequently declared Islamic Municipality pursuant to Batas Pambansa (PB) Number 33 on June 4, 1984.

== Geography ==
Tamparan is located on the eastern part of Lanao del Sur. It is bounded on the north by the Municipality of Taraka, on the south by Poona-Bayabao, and on the west by Lake Lanao.

Tamparan is approximately 27 kilometres (17 mi) from Marawi, the provincial capital and also the nearest center of commercial activities to Tamparan. Tamparan and Marawi are connected by road passing through the municipalities of Ditsaan-Ramain, Bubong, Buadiposo-Buntong, Mulondo and Taraka. Tamparan is also accessible by water transportation through Lake Lanao.

Tamparan has a total land area of 17,000 hectares (42,000 acres) more or less.

=== Barangays ===
Tamparan is politically subdivided into 44 barangays. Each barangay consists of puroks while some have sitios.

- Bocalan
- Bangon
- Cabasaran
- Dasomalong
- Dilausan
- Lalabuan
- Lilod Tamparan
- Lindongan
- Linuk
- Occidental Linuk
- Linuk Oriental
- Lumbaca Ingud
- Lumbacaingud South
- Lumbaca Lilod
- Balt madiar
- Mala-abangon
- Maliwanag
- Maidan Linuk
- Miondas
- New Lumbacaingud
- Pimbago-Pagalongan
- Pagayawan
- Picarabawan
- Poblacion I
- Poblacion II
- Poblacion III
- Poblacion IV
- Raya Miondas
- Raya Buadi Barao
- Raya Tamparan
- Salongabanding
- Suminunggay
- Talub
- Tatayawan North
- Tatayawan South
- Tubok
- Beruar
- Dasomalong
- Guinaopan
- Lumbac
- Minanga
- Lilod Tubok
- Moriatao Datu
- Pagalamatan Linuk
- Pindolonan Moriatao Sarip

=== Topography ===
The Municipality lies on the plain and slightly sloppy area hence erosion is less. But due to its location along the lake, some of the areas are affected by the rise and fall of the lake water level.

=== Climate ===
Climate data for Tamparan, Lanao de Sur
Month	Jan	Feb	Mar	Apr	May	Jun	Jul	Aug	Sep	Oct	Nov	Dec	Year
Mean daily maximum °C (°F)	24 (75)	24 (75)	25 (77)	26 (79)	26 (79)	25 (77)	25 (77)	25 (77)	25 (77)	25 (77)	25 (77)	25 (77)	25 (77)
Mean daily minimum °C (°F)	20 (68)	20 (68)	20 (68)	20 (68)	21 (70)	21 (70)	20 (68)	20 (68)	20 (68)	20 (68)	20 (68)	20 (68)	20 (68)
Average precipitation mm (inches)	159 (6.3)	143 (5.6)	166 (6.5)	183 (7.2)	357 (14.1)	414 (16.3)	333 (13.1)	309 (12.2)	289 (11.4)	285 (11.2)	253 (10.0)	166 (6.5)	3,057 (120.4)
Average rainy days	18.4	17.2	20.6	23.4	29.3	29.2	29.9	29.4	27.7	28.7	25.5	19.9	299.2
Source: Meteoblue (modeled/calculated data, not measured locally)

The month of February has the lowest average temperature of 17.6 °C (63.7 °F) and the month of April has the highest with 28.8 °C (83.8 °F). A stable north-west wind blows from January to September. In the months of October and November, the wind blows either north-west or north–south.

Generally, the municipality is under the fourth type of climate characterized by even distribution of rainfall through the year. The heaviest rain is experienced in the months of January, May, and July. Dry months are September and November.

== Demographics ==
Population census of Tamparan
Year	Pop.	±% p.a.
1918	3,308	—
1939	6,439	+3.22%
1948	11,743	+6.90%
1960	14,452	+1.74%
1970	11,939	−1.89%
1975	11,420	−0.89%
1980	10,196	−2.24%
1990	16,379	+4.86%
1995	17,507	+1.26%
2000	19,975	+2.87%
2007	27,875	+4.70%
2010	22,367	−7.70%
2015	25,874	+2.81%
2020	32,074	+4.62%
2024	37,190	+3.62%
Source: Philippine Statistics Authority

=== Language and ethnicity ===
The majority of the Tamparanian (or Itamparanen in Mëranaw) traces their roots to Meranao ethnicity although there are also Tagalog, Bisaya and other ethnicities who migrated in the town. The vernacular language is Filipino in the form of Mëranaw, while Tagalog and English are the languages also widely used in education and business throughout the town.

=== Religion ===
The majority of Tamparanian are Muslims. Sunni Islam is the predominant religion and widely practiced. Many people have studied Islamic (Muslim) and Arabic education both within the country and abroad. Other religious groups such as Christian could also be found in town.

== Economy ==
Poverty Incidence of Tamparan

Source: Philippine Statistics Authority

== Education ==
- Tamparan Populace Islamic College (TPIC)
- As-Salihein Integrated School
- Mindanao State University - Tamparan Community High School
- Datu Palawan Disomimba Memorial National High School
