= Lanao del Sur's 4th parliamentary district =

Parliamentary district for the Bangsamoro Parliament

- Constituency for the Bangsamoro Parliament
- Boundary of Lanao del Sur's 4th parliamentary district in Lanao del Sur
- Province: Lanao del Sur
- Population: 160,017 (2024)
- Electorate: 86,467 (2026)

Current constituency
- Member of Parliament: Lampa Pandi (elect)
- Political party: UBJP

Lanao del Sur's 4th parliamentary district is the fourth of the nine parliamentary districts of the province of Lanao del Sur for the Bangsamoro Parliament. It is composed of the municipalities of Masiu, Mulondo, Poona Bayabao, Tamparan, and Taraka.

Lampa Pandi of the United Bangsamoro Justice Party is the member of Parliament-elect for the district following the inaugural 2026 Bangsamoro Parliament election. He will assume office on October 30, 2026.

== List of MPs representing the district ==
No.	Portrait	Member (Lifespan)	Term of office	Party	Parliament	Electoral history	Constituencies
1		Lampa Pandi (born 1964)	Assuming office on October 30, 2026	UBJP	1st Parliament	Elected in 2026.	2026–present Masiu, Mulondo, Poona Bayabao, Tamparan, Taraka

== Election results ==
=== 2026 ===
2026 Bangsamoro Parliament election in Lanao del Sur
Party	Candidate	Votes	%
UBJP	Lampa Pandi	38,505	50.48
SIAP	Odin Sumagayan	37,707	49.44
PRO Bangsamoro	Camal Abdul	55	0.07
Independent	Johari Comadug	8	0.01
Total votes		76,275	100.00
UBJP win (new seat)			
