= Mushawara Party =

- President: Alipikre Basher
- Founded: April 30, 2000
- House of Representatives: 0 / 8 (Bangsamoro seats only)
- Provincial governors: 0 / 6 (Bangsamoro only)
- Provincial vice governors: 0 / 6 (Bangsamoro only)
- Provincial board members: 0 / 46 (Bangsamoro regular seats only)
- Bangsamoro Parliament: 0 / 80

The People's Consultative (Mushawara) Party (PCMP), or simply the Mushawara Party, is a regional political party in the Bangsamoro region of the Philippines.

== History ==
=== Formation and early years ===
The People's Consultative Party or the Mushawara Party was formed on April 30, 2000, and filed registration with the Commission on Election on November 11, 2000. It is an Islamic political party formed by the Ulama of the Moro National Liberation Front with mushawara or consensus building, egalitarianism, and Islamic values as a foundation of their party. At formation, they advocated the reform of the Autonomous Region in Muslim Mindanao (ARMM), the predecessor of Bangsamoro region. They advocated fought against the perceived influence of the national government. Allegedly, no candidate which was endorsed by the national government has lost in the ARMM elections.

As per Commission on Elections data in 2010, Mushawara Party's contituency includes the provinces of Lanao del Sur, Lanao del Norte, Maguindanao, Basilan, Sulu, Tawi-Tawi, Zamboanga del Sur.

=== 2026 Bangsamoro election ===
The Mushawara Party has sought to get a seat in the Bangsamoro Parliament. The COMELEC initially dismissed its accreditation application as a regional political party for the 2026 Bangsamoro Parliament election due to documentary compliance issues. The COMELEC later approved the application of Mushawara. Their candidacy is led by party president and first nominee, Alipikre Basher.
