= Bangsamoro Peoples Party =

Political party in the Philippines

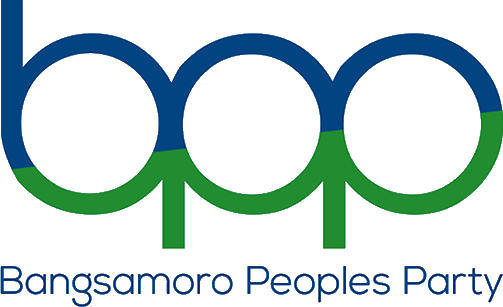
- Abbreviation: BPP
- President: Haron Sakilan (officer-in-charge)
- Chairman: Ustadz Alzad Sattar
- Secretary-General: Rasol Mitmug Jr.
- Founded: 2019; 7 years ago
- Headquarters: BPP Regional Headquarters, Cotabato City
- Colors: Blue and green
- House of Representatives: 0 / 8 (Bangsamoro seats only)
- Provincial governors: 0 / 6 (Bangsamoro only)
- Provincial vice governors: 0 / 6 (Bangsamoro only)
- Provincial board members: 0 / 46 (Bangsamoro regular seats only)
- Bangsamoro Parliament: 0 / 80

The Bangsamoro Peoples Party (BPP) is a local political party in the Bangsamoro Autonomous Region in Muslim Mindanao in the Philippines. It was founded in 2019 by former representative and ARMM governor Mujiv Hataman.

BPP is one of the political parties accredited by the Commission on Elections to participate in the 2026 Bangsamoro Parliament election, with candidates vying for seats in the parliamentary districts of the region. The party is affiliated with the BARMM Grand Coalition.
