= ISAMA Party =

- Chairman: Jamar Kulayan
- Headquarters: Bongao, Tawi-Tawi
- Ideology: Regionalism
- Slogan: Sa Isama, Lahat Kasama (transl. With Isama, Everyone is included)
- House of Representatives: 0 / 8 (Bangsamoro seats only)
- Provincial governors: 0 / 6 (Bangsamoro only)
- Provincial vice governors: 0 / 6 (Bangsamoro only)
- Provincial board members: 0 / 46 (Bangsamoro regular seats only)
- Bangsamoro Parliament: 0 / 80

The Indigenous, Settlers, Sama and Minorities Alliance Party or simply the ISAMA Party, is a regional political party in the Bangsamoro of the Philippines.

== History ==
The ISAMA Party was organized by Jamar Kulayan, Al-treke Dayan, Ustadz Nafeesur Rahman Suhod, Alsadat Sabal, and Danny Sahi in 2023 in Zamboanga City. The party itself would later be headquartered in the town of Bongao in Tawi-Tawi.

The party attempted to secure accreditation for the inaugural Bangsamoro Parliament elections, then scheduled in May 2025. However their petition was dismissed by the Commission on Elections (COMELEC) in October 2024.

Eventually, ISAMA Party was able to secure accreditation for the elections which was postponed to September 2026. It is now eligible to win seats in the Bangsamoro Parliament in the 2026 elections.

== Name and logo ==
The ISAMA Party seeks to represent the interest of a broad range of demographic groups in the Bangsamoro based on its name. According to its registration petition, its name represents the indigenous peoples (both the majority Moro and Lumad peoples), the settler community, the Sama speakers explicitly, as well as other marginalized groups naming the elderly and retired public officials and educators as part of the "minorities" in its name.

The logo depicts a Lepa, a traditional boat of the Sama people, with a man riding it. It has a watermark of a crescent over it and is within a octagonal star. Its slogan is "Sa Isama, Lahat Kasama"
