= Al Ittihad–UKB Party =

Al Ittihad–UKB Party Al-Ittihad Mindanawe Darussalam–Ungaya Ku Kawagibu Bangsamoro
- Leader: Suharto Mangudadatu
- Ideology: Regionalism
- Colors: Red, Yellow, Green, White
- House of Representatives: 0 / 8 (Bangsamoro seats only)
- Provincial governors: 0 / 6 (Bangsamoro only)
- Provincial vice governors: 0 / 6 (Bangsamoro only)
- Provincial board members: 0 / 46 (Bangsamoro regular seats only)
- Bangsamoro Parliament: 1 / 80

Party flag

The Al-Ittihad Mindanawe Darussalam–Ungaya Ku Kawagibu Bangsamoro, simply known as the Al Ittihad–UKB Party, is a regional political party in the Bangsamoro of the Philippines.

The party was established by Suharto Mangudadatu.

== History ==
The Al Ittihad–UKB Party is a political party formed with the merger of the non-governmental organization Al Ittihad and Ungaya Ku Kawagibu Bangsamoro (UKB). Suharto Mangudadatu of UKB became the party president of the unified party. He is credited as the founder of the Al Ittihad–UKB Party.

They have been building their membership as early as May 2022 when they held a "convergence" or meeting which was attended by members from the Moro Islamic Liberation Front and Moro National Liberation Front. They were later joined by representatives from other sectoral organizations and other local politicians to join them.

Al Ittihad–UKB joined an electoral alliance with the Bangsamoro People’s Party and Serbisyong Inklusibo–Alyansang Progresibo for the upcoming first Bangsamoro Parliament elections in April 2024. This alliance later became a regional political party in itself, the BARMM Grand Coalition.

Al Ittihad–UKB is accredited as a regional political party for the 2026 Bangsamoro Parliament election, the first regular legislative election for the autonomous region.
