= Nurredha Misuari =

Filipino politician

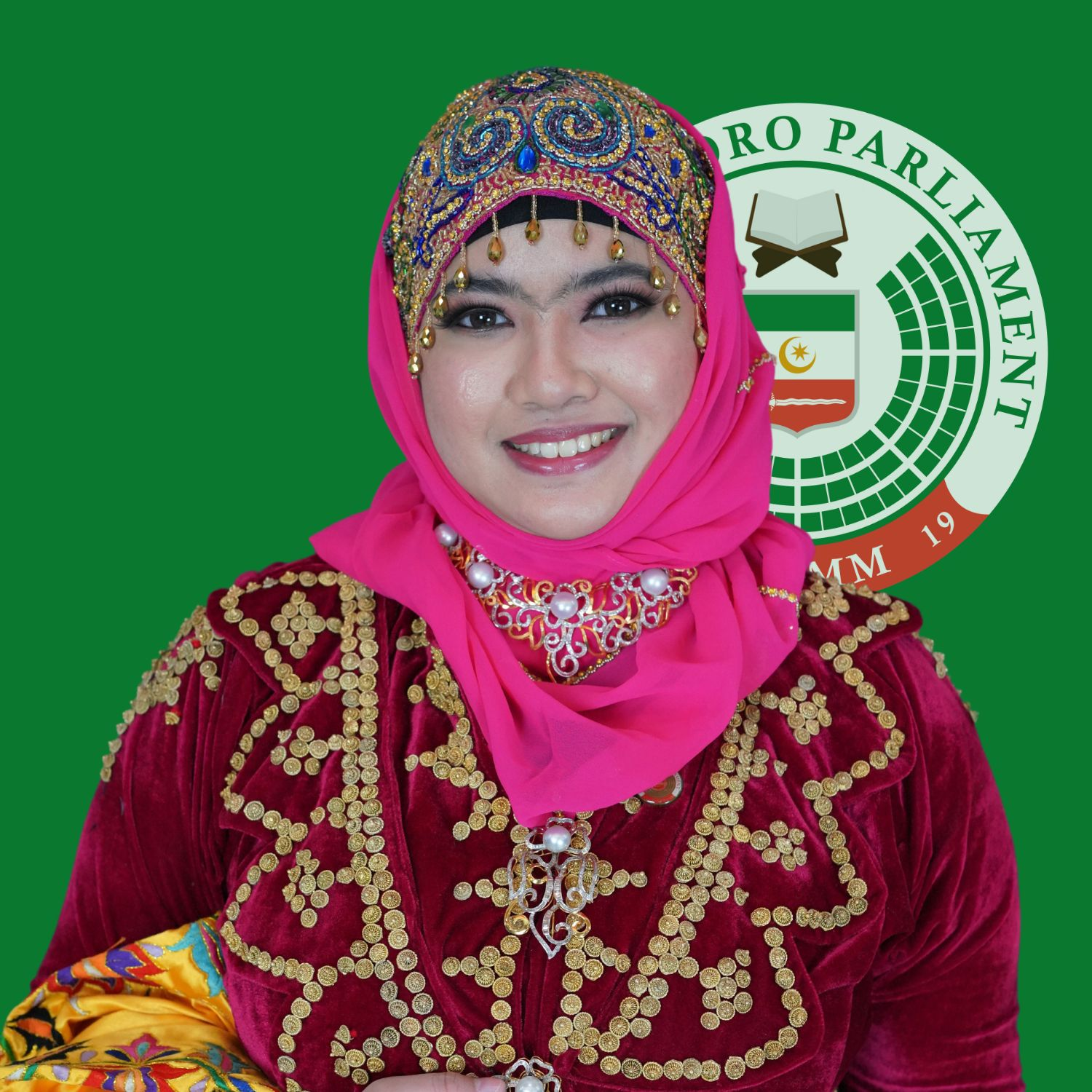

Member of the Bangsamoro Transition Authority Parliament
- Incumbent
- Assumed office September 15, 2022
- Nominated by: Philippine national government
- Appointed by: Bongbong Marcos
- Chief Minister: Murad Ebrahim

Personal details
- Born: December 1994 (age 31) Jolo, Sulu, Philippines
- Party: Mahardika
- Parent(s): Nur Misuari; Tarhata Ibrahim

Nurredha Ibrahim Misuari is a Moro Filipino who is a member of the Bangsamoro Transition Authority Parliament.

== Early life ==
She is born in Jolo, Sulu in December 1994 to Moro National Liberation Front (MNLF) founder Nur Misuari and Tarhata Ibrahim. Ibrahim is her father's third wife. She is the only child of Misuari to be born in Sulu.

Misuari attended elementary and high school in Quezon City. She graduated from St. Joseph's College in high school. For here collegiate studies, she attended the University of Immaculate Conception in Davao City where she obtained a degree in business administration in 2019 and graduated with magna cum laude honors.

== Career ==
=== Moro National Liberation Front ===
At age 16, she was tasked by her father to head the MNLF National Identification Committee which deals with the group's membership cards. She also served as Deputy Head of the MNLF Peace Coordinating Committee.

=== Bangsamoro government ===
Misuari along with her half-brother Abdulkarim Misuari was appointed to the Bangsamoro Transition Authority Parliament by President Bongbong Marcos on August 12, 2022.
