= Alliance of Bangsamoro Tri-Peoples Party =

- President: Samsodin Amella
- Chairman: Wahab T.H. Omar
- Secretary-General: Emran Mohamad
- Headquarters: Cotabato City
- Ideology: Regionalism
- House of Representatives: 0 / 8 (Bangsamoro seats only)
- Provincial governors: 0 / 6 (Bangsamoro only)
- Provincial vice governors: 0 / 6 (Bangsamoro only)
- Provincial board members: 0 / 46 (Bangsamoro regular seats only)
- Bangsamoro Parliament: 0 / 80

Website
- abotparty.org

The Alliance of Bangsamoro Tri-Peoples Party (ABoT) is a regional political party in the Bangsamoro of the Philippines.

== History ==
The Alliance of Bangsamoro Tri-Peoples Party was an initiative by the civil society organizations led by the League of Bangsamoro Organizations (LBO). The party is meant to represent the interest of three major demographic groups in the Bangsamoro autonomous region: the Moro, the Lumad, and the settler community.

The ABoT Party was officially established on March 24, 2026 at its party convention. The LBO Council of Representatives affirmed the party's creation five days later.

They are among the parties contesting for seats in the Bangsamoro Parliament in the 2026 elections. It formally expressed its intent to join the election in April 4, 2026 and was later given accreditation by the Commission on Elections.
