= Partido Bangon Bangsamoro =

- President: Nashrudin Kusain
- Headquarters: Cotabato City
- House of Representatives: 0 / 8 (Bangsamoro seats only)
- Provincial governors: 0 / 6 (Bangsamoro only)
- Provincial vice governors: 0 / 6 (Bangsamoro only)
- Provincial board members: 0 / 46 (Bangsamoro regular seats only)
- Bangsamoro Parliament: 0 / 80

Website
- www.bangonbangsamoro.com

The Partido Bangon Bangsamoro (PBB, lit. 'Arise Bangsamoro Party') is a regional political party in the Bangsamoro of the Philippines.

== History ==
=== Founding ===
Partido Bangon Bangsamoro (PBB) was established in 2022 in Cotabato City. PBB positions itself as a "professional-led" party not associated to political clans, the Moro Islamic Liberation Front, and the Moro National Liberation Front. Its members were part of eventual President Bongbong Marcos' vote protection unit for the 2016 and 2022 national elections.

=== Accreditation ===
It attempted to get accreditation for the Bangsamoro Parliament elections then scheduled for May 2025. The Commission on Elections then dismissed their petition in October 2024. The PBB eventually attained accreditation for Bangsamoro Parliament election rescheduled for September 2026.
