= Mulondo, Lanao del Sur =

Municipality in Lanao del Sur, Philippines

Mulondo مولوندو
- Municipality
- Municipality of Mulondo
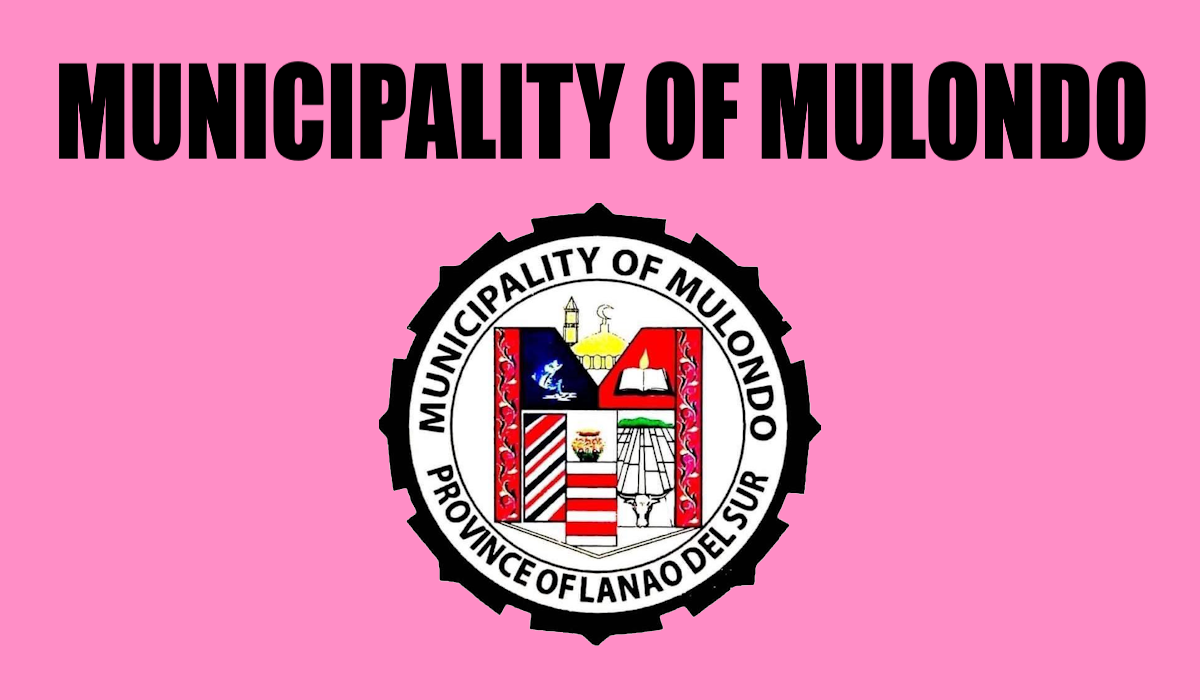
- Flag Seal

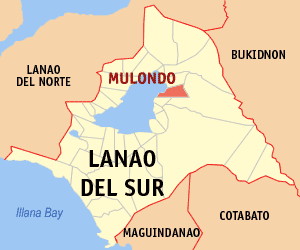
- Map of Lanao del Sur with Mulondo highlighted
- Interactive map of Mulondo
- Location within the Philippines
- Coordinates: 7°55′03″N 124°21′43″E
- Country: Philippines
- Region: Bangsamoro Autonomous Region in Muslim Mindanao
- Province: Lanao del Sur
- House district: 1st district
- Parliamentary district: 4th district
- Barangays: 26 (see Barangays)

Government
  - Type: Sangguniang Bayan
  - Mayor: Abdulhakim Orako Panandigan
  - Vice Mayor: Khalid M. Panandigan
  - House Representative: Ziaur-Rahman A. Adiong
  - Municipal Council: Members: Amenollah P. Mala; Mauna B. Azis; Meme C. Maute; Alicaya S. Alawiya; Taha C. Sumangan; Abduljabbar D. Macabantog; Ibnalex A. Macabantog; Macapanton M. Cosain
  - Electorate: 11,873 voters (2025)

Area
  - Total: 458.67 km^{2} (177.09 sq mi)
- Elevation: 712 m (2,336 ft)
- Highest elevation: 935 m (3,068 ft)
- Lowest elevation: 696 m (2,283 ft)

Population (2024 census)
  - Total: 23,159
  - Density: 50.492/km^{2} (130.77/sq mi)
  - Households: 2,830

Economy
  - Income class: 2nd municipal income class
  - Poverty incidence: 19.44% (2023)
  - Revenue: ₱ 216.8 million (2024)
  - Assets: ₱ 128.3 million (2024)
  - Expenditure: ₱ 208.9 million (2024)
  - Liabilities: ₱ 1.985 million (2024)

Service provider
  - Electricity: Lanao del Sur Electric Cooperative (LASURECO)
- Time zone: UTC+8 (PST)
- ZIP code: 9702
- PSGC: 1903619000
- IDD : area code: +63 (0)63
- Native languages: Maranao; Tagalog

Mulondo, officially the Municipality of Mulondo (Maranao: Inged a Mulondo; Tagalog: Bayan ng Mulondo), is a municipality in the province of Lanao del Sur, Philippines. According to the 2024 census, it has a population of 23,159 people.

== Etymology ==
Its name is derived from the Maranao dialect, which means "People of Lake".

== Geography ==
Formerly known as Bato Intan, it is geographically situated east from Masiu, one of the four (4) Principalities of Lanao (Pangampong A Ranao), the governing bodies of the Lanao Sultanate. Strategically located in the 1st District of Lanao del Sur where it is partially urban.

=== Barangays ===
Mulondo is politically subdivided into 26 barangays. Each barangay consists of puroks while some have sitios.

- Bangon
- Bubonga Guilopa
- Buadi-Abala
- Buadi-Bayawa
- Buadi-Insuba
- Bubong
- Cabasaran
- Cairatan
- Cormatan
- Poblacion (Dado)
- Dalama
- Dansalan
- Dimarao
- Guilopa
- Ilian
- Kitambugun
- Lama (Bagoaingud)
- Lilod
- Lilod Raybalai
- Lumbaca Ingud
- Lumbac (Lumbac Bubong)
- Madaya
- Pindolonan
- Salipongan
- Sugan
- Bagoaingud

=== Climate ===
Climate data for Mulondo, Lanao del Sur
Month	Jan	Feb	Mar	Apr	May	Jun	Jul	Aug	Sep	Oct	Nov	Dec	Year
Mean daily maximum °C (°F)	24 (75)	24 (75)	25 (77)	26 (79)	26 (79)	25 (77)	25 (77)	25 (77)	25 (77)	25 (77)	25 (77)	25 (77)	25 (77)
Mean daily minimum °C (°F)	20 (68)	20 (68)	20 (68)	20 (68)	21 (70)	21 (70)	20 (68)	20 (68)	20 (68)	20 (68)	20 (68)	20 (68)	20 (68)
Average precipitation mm (inches)	159 (6.3)	143 (5.6)	166 (6.5)	183 (7.2)	357 (14.1)	414 (16.3)	333 (13.1)	309 (12.2)	289 (11.4)	285 (11.2)	253 (10.0)	166 (6.5)	3,057 (120.4)
Average rainy days	18.4	17.2	20.6	23.4	29.3	29.2	29.9	29.4	27.7	28.7	25.5	19.9	299.2
Source: Meteoblue (modeled/calculated data, not measured locally)

== Demographics ==
Population census of Mulondo
Year	Pop.	±% p.a.
1918	1,312	—
1939	4,641	+6.20%
1948	11,333	+10.43%
1960	15,920	+2.87%
1970	15,961	+0.03%
1975	11,964	−5.62%
1980	10,750	−2.12%
1990	11,135	+0.35%
1995	11,866	+1.20%
2000	12,368	+0.89%
2007	16,458	+4.02%
2010	14,065	−5.56%
2015	16,067	+2.57%
2020	19,932	+4.64%
2024	23,159	+3.67%
Source: Philippine Statistics Authority

== Economy ==
Poverty Incidence of Mulondo

Source: Philippine Statistics Authority
