= Raayat Democratic Party =

Political party in the Philippines

- Abbreviation: RDP; Raayat
- President: Jose Lorena
- Secretary-General: Nasser Mustafa
- Founded: August 7, 2020
- Headquarters: Lamitan, Basilan
- Colors: Green, red, and yellow
- Slogan: Partido para sa lahat ng Bangsamoro ('Party for all of Bangsamoro')
- Bangsamoro Parliament: 1 / 80

The Raayat Democratic Party, also known as the Bangsamoro Peoples' Democratic Party, is a regional political party based in Lamitan, Basilan, Philippines.

== History ==
While the Raayat Democratic Party was established on August 7, 2020 in Zamboanga City, its roots from the Bangsamoro National Congress of the Moro National Liberation Front which has existed as early as the 1970s. The Congress is known for making consultations with the masses or the raayat (people).

Raayat is one of the parties contesting in the 2026 Bangsamoro Parliament election through proportional representation. Raayat's party president Jose Lorena is currently one of the deputy speakers of the Parliament.

They managed to secure one seat via proportional representation after breaking the 2.5% electoral threshold with 68,839 votes, equivalent to 3.64% of the total votes cast. This secured a seat for Jose Lorena, their first nominee, in the Bangsamoro Parliament.

== Elected members ==
=== 1st Parliament (2026-present) ===
==== Proportional representation members ====
Members of Parliament of Raayat Democratic Party in 2026
Name	Took office	Bloc
Jose Lorena	October 30, 2026	TBA

== Electoral performance ==
Election	Leader	Proportional				District				Sectoral				Seats	±	Government
Election	Leader	Votes	%	Place	Seats	Votes	%	Place	Seats	Votes	%	Place	Seats	Seats	±	Government
2026	Jose Lorena	68,839	3.64	4th	1 / 40	—	—	—	0 / 32	—	—	—	0 / 8	1 / 80	New	TBA
