= Moro Ako Party =

- Leader: Najib Taib
- Headquarters: Marawi, Philippines
- Colors: Green Gold

Moro Ako Party (lit. 'I am a Moro Party') is a regional political party in Bangsamoro.

== History ==
Moro Ako Party is an organization based in Marawi. In the 2022 election, they sought party-list representation in the national House of Representatives as the OK Partylist. As OK Partylist, the group claimed to represent all marginalized sectors as well as the Moro people and Filipino Muslims. They changed nominees in November 2021. They failed to win any seat.

Moro Ako was accredited as a regional party by the Commission on Elections (COMELEC) for the purpose of the 2026 Bangsamoro Parliament election. The party is led by lawyer Najib Taib. They are against the postponement of the poll.

However they were rendered ineligible, after the COMELEC acted on a petition cancelling their accreditation as a regional party over alleged misrepresentation. The petition alleged that Moro Ako declared non-existent chapters but the insists that the offices do exist despite "typographical errors". The COMELEC ruled with finality on September 7, 2026, affirming the disqualification of Moro Ako.
