= Poona Bayabao =

Municipality in Lanao del Sur, Philippines

Poona Bayabao فوعونا باياباو Gata
- Municipality
- Municipality of Poona Bayabao
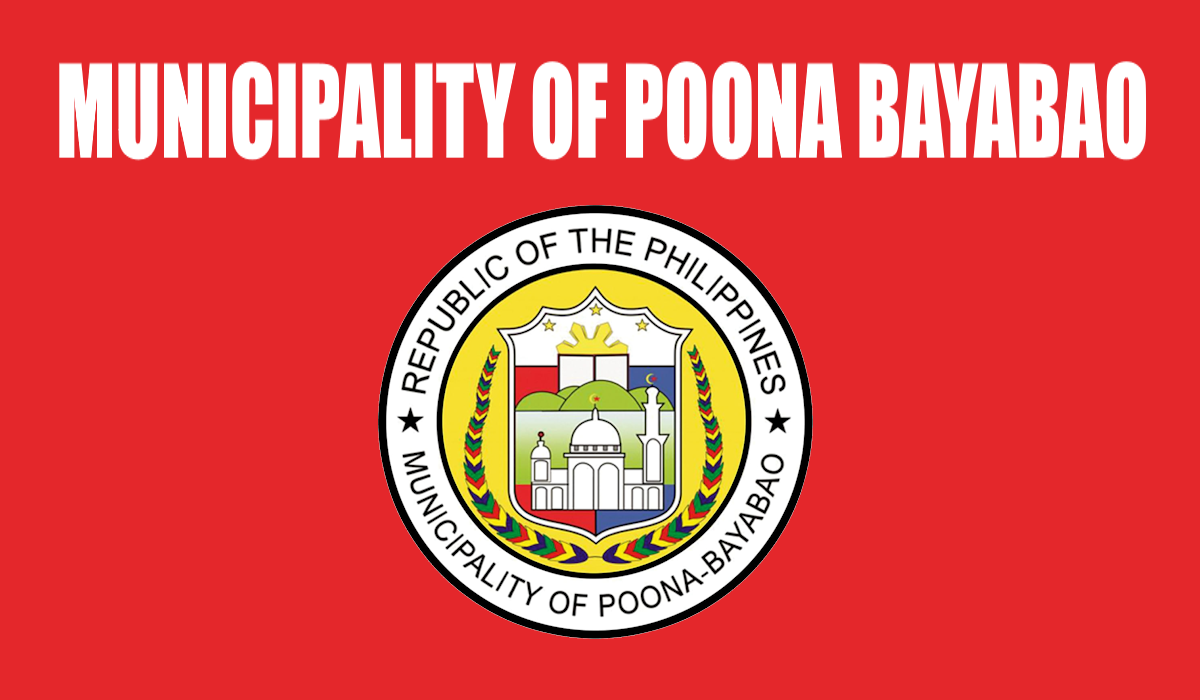
- Flag Seal

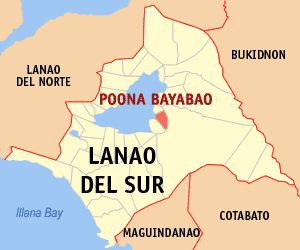
- Map of Lanao del Sur with Poona Bayabao highlighted
- Interactive map of Poona Bayabao
- Location within the Philippines
- Coordinates: 7°51′N 124°21′E
- Country: Philippines
- Region: Bangsamoro Autonomous Region in Muslim Mindanao
- Province: Lanao del Sur
- House district: 1st district
- Parliamentary district: 4th district
- Barangays: 25 (see Barangays)

Government
  - Type: Sangguniang Bayan
  - Mayor: Janimah L. Derogongan
  - Vice Mayor: Nadja Panoroganan B. Pacala
  - House Representative: Ziaur-Rahman A. Adiong
  - Municipal Council: Members: Ayman S. Pandi; Jabir S. Hadjiibrahim; Abdulhaleym Abdurraheym S. Macud; Naumihayr S. Bascara; Ramadan P. Macapaar; Sittie D. Pao; Sohra S. Rakim; Mohammad Faisal D. Benaning
  - Electorate: 13,662 voters (2025)

Area
  - Total: 242.34 km^{2} (93.57 sq mi)
- Elevation: 733 m (2,405 ft)
- Highest elevation: 1,147 m (3,763 ft)
- Lowest elevation: 696 m (2,283 ft)

Population (2024 census)
  - Total: 33,307
  - Density: 137.44/km^{2} (355.97/sq mi)
  - Households: 4,892

Economy
  - Income class: 2nd municipal income class
  - Poverty incidence: 19.28% (2023)
  - Revenue: ₱ 190.7 million (2024)
  - Assets: ₱ 212.8 million (2024)
  - Expenditure: ₱ 206.5 million (2024)
  - Liabilities: ₱ 1.678 million (2024)

Service provider
  - Electricity: Lanao del Sur Electric Cooperative (LASURECO)
- Time zone: UTC+8 (PST)
- ZIP code: 9705
- PSGC: 1903622000
- IDD : area code: +63 (0)63
- Native languages: Maranao; Tagalog
- Website: www.poonabayabao-lds.gov.ph

Poona Bayabao, officially the Municipality of Poona Bayabao (Maranao: Inged a Poona Bayabao; Tagalog: Bayan ng Poona Bayabao), is a municipality in the province of Lanao del Sur, Philippines. According to the 2024 census, it has a population of 33,307 people.

It is formerly known as Gata.

== History ==
On November 12, 1963, during election day, independent Liberal mayoral candidate Hadji Ibrahim Ompong Batuz was assassinated along with his son at the Gata Elementary School.

== Geography ==
=== Barangays ===
Poona Bayabao is politically subdivided into 25 barangays. Each barangay consists of puroks while some have sitios.

- Ataragadong
- Bangon
- Bansayan
- Bubong-Dimunda
- Bugaran
- Bualan
- Cadayonan
- Calilangan Dicala
- Calupaan
- Dimayon
- Dilausan
- Dongcoan
- Gadongan
- Poblacion (Gata Proper)
- Liangan
- Lumbac
- Lumbaca Ingud
- Madanding
- Pantao
- Punud
- Ragayan
- Rogan Cairan
- Talaguian
- Rogan Tandiong Dimayon
- Taporog

=== Climate ===
Climate data for Poona Bayabao, Lanao de Sur
Month	Jan	Feb	Mar	Apr	May	Jun	Jul	Aug	Sep	Oct	Nov	Dec	Year
Mean daily maximum °C (°F)	24 (75)	24 (75)	25 (77)	26 (79)	26 (79)	25 (77)	25 (77)	25 (77)	25 (77)	25 (77)	25 (77)	25 (77)	25 (77)
Mean daily minimum °C (°F)	20 (68)	20 (68)	20 (68)	20 (68)	21 (70)	21 (70)	20 (68)	20 (68)	20 (68)	21 (70)	20 (68)	20 (68)	20 (69)
Average precipitation mm (inches)	159 (6.3)	143 (5.6)	166 (6.5)	183 (7.2)	357 (14.1)	414 (16.3)	333 (13.1)	309 (12.2)	289 (11.4)	285 (11.2)	253 (10.0)	166 (6.5)	3,057 (120.4)
Average rainy days	18.4	17.2	20.6	23.4	29.3	29.2	29.9	29.4	27.7	28.7	25.5	19.9	299.2
Source: Meteoblue (modeled/calculated data, not measured locally)

== Demographics ==
Population census of Poona Bayabao
Year	Pop.	±% p.a.
1918	2,415	—
1939	4,330	+2.82%
1948	3,881	−1.21%
1960	9,179	+7.44%
1970	10,780	+1.62%
1975	12,750	+3.42%
1980	8,955	−6.82%
1990	13,105	+3.88%
1995	15,149	+2.75%
2000	17,390	+3.00%
2007	23,589	+4.29%
2010	19,229	−7.17%
2015	22,227	+2.80%
2020	31,141	+7.36%
2024	33,307	+1.63%
Source: Philippine Statistics Authority

== Economy ==
Poverty Incidence of Poona Bayabao

Source: Philippine Statistics Authority
