= Taraka, Lanao del Sur =

Municipality in Lanao del Sur, Philippines

Taraka تاراكا
- Municipality
- Municipality of Taraka
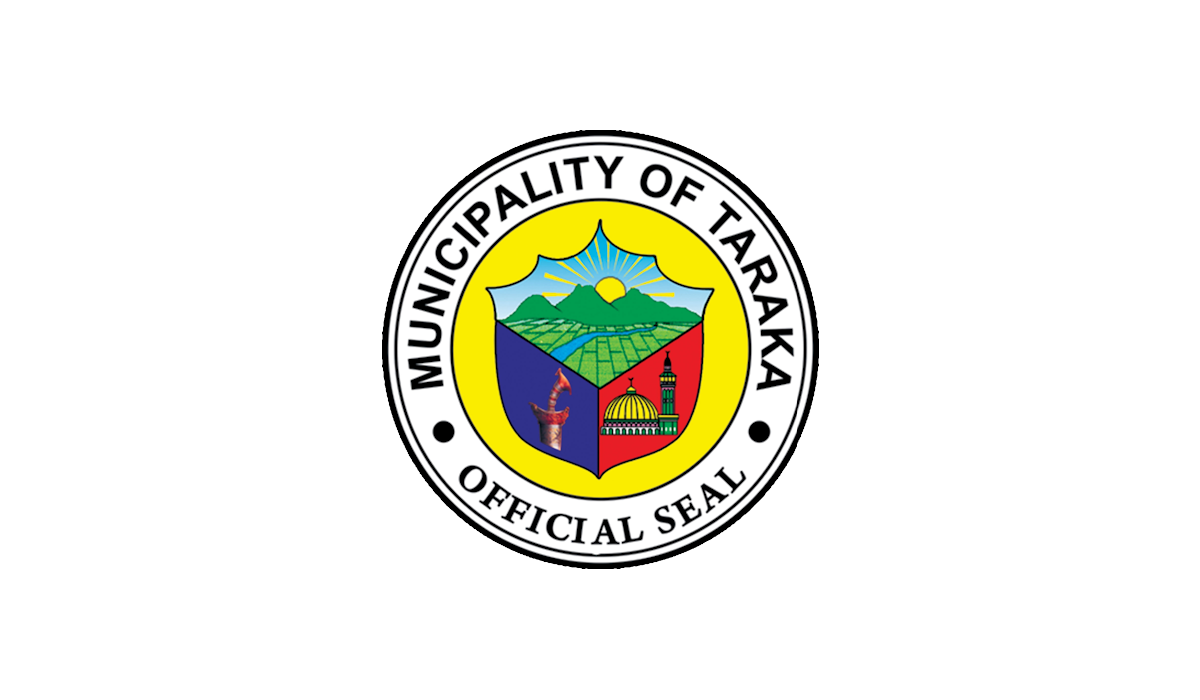
- Flag Seal

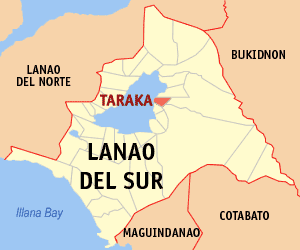
- Map of Lanao del Sur with Taraka highlighted
- Interactive map of Taraka
- Location within the Philippines
- Coordinates: 7°54′00″N 124°20′04″E
- Country: Philippines
- Region: Bangsamoro Autonomous Region in Muslim Mindanao
- Province: Lanao del Sur
- House district: 1st district
- Parliamentary district: 4th district
- Barangays: 43 (see Barangays)

Government
  - Type: Sangguniang Bayan
  - Mayor: Amenodin U. Sumagayan
  - Vice Mayor: Nashiba G. Sumagayan
  - House Representative: Ziaur-Rahman A. Adiong
  - Municipal Council: Members: Mohammad Aquil G. Sumagayan; Abdul Hakim G. Mangata; Khalid P. Sumagayan; Diamar S. Pandapatan; Mohammad Nassef M. Sumpingan; Jamael G. Sumagayan; Salic C. Colangcag; Sambitory B. Paunte
  - Electorate: 16,524 voters (2025)

Area
  - Total: 435.40 km^{2} (168.11 sq mi)
- Elevation: 703 m (2,306 ft)
- Highest elevation: 904 m (2,966 ft)
- Lowest elevation: 696 m (2,283 ft)

Population (2024 census)
  - Total: 29,558
  - Density: 67.887/km^{2} (175.83/sq mi)
  - Households: 4,020

Economy
  - Income class: 2nd municipal income class
  - Poverty incidence: 21.36% (2023)
  - Revenue: ₱ 191.2 million (2024)
  - Assets: ₱ 527.4 million (2024)
  - Expenditure: ₱ 188.9 million (2024)
  - Liabilities: ₱ 171 million (2024)

Service provider
  - Electricity: Lanao del Sur Electric Cooperative (LASURECO)
- Time zone: UTC+8 (PST)
- ZIP code: 9712
- PSGC: 1903627000
- IDD : area code: +63 (0)63
- Native languages: Maranao; Tagalog
- Website: taraka.gov.ph

Taraka, officially the Municipality of Taraka (Maranao: Inged a Taraka; Tagalog: Bayan ng Taraka), is a municipality in the province of Lanao del Sur, Philippines. According to the 2024 census, it has a population of 29,558 people.

The oldest mosque and the second oldest mosque in the Philippines called Baab-Ur Rahman Masjid built in Lanao del Sur was located in the town.

== History ==
Taraka, before American colonization, was the capital and seat of government of the State of Masiu, Confederate States of Lanao.

It was officially declared as a separate and distinct municipality in accordance with Executive Order No. 21 dated June 25, 1963.

The royal title of "Sultan sa Masiu" is traditionally confirmed in this municipality.

== Geography ==
=== Barangays ===
Taraka is politically subdivided into 43 barangays. Each barangay consists of puroks while some have sitios.

- Bandera Buisan
- Boriongan
- Borowa
- Buadi Dingun
- Buadi Amao
- Buadi Amunta
- Buadi Amunud
- Buadi Arorao
- Buadi Atopa
- Buadi Dayomangga
- Buadi Ongcalo
- Bucalan
- Cadayonan Bagumbayan
- Caramat
- Carandangan Calopaan
- Datu Ma-as
- Dilabayan
- Dimayon
- Gapao Balindong
- Ilian
- Lumasa
- Lumbac Bagoaingud
- Lumbac Bubong Maindang
- Lumbac Pitakus
- Malungun
- Mangayao
- Maruhom
- Masolun
- Moriatao Loksa Datu
- Pagalamatan
- Pindolonan
- Pitakus
- Ririk
- Salipongan
- Lumasa Proper (Salvador Conch)
- Sambolawan
- Samporna Salamatollah
- Somiorang Bandingun
- Sigayan Proper
- Sunggod
- Sundig
- Supangan
- Tupa-an Buadiatupa

=== Climate ===
Climate data for Taraka, Lanao de Sur
Month	Jan	Feb	Mar	Apr	May	Jun	Jul	Aug	Sep	Oct	Nov	Dec	Year
Mean daily maximum °C (°F)	24 (75)	24 (75)	25 (77)	26 (79)	26 (79)	25 (77)	25 (77)	25 (77)	25 (77)	25 (77)	25 (77)	25 (77)	25 (77)
Mean daily minimum °C (°F)	20 (68)	20 (68)	20 (68)	20 (68)	21 (70)	21 (70)	20 (68)	20 (68)	20 (68)	21 (70)	20 (68)	20 (68)	20 (69)
Average precipitation mm (inches)	159 (6.3)	143 (5.6)	166 (6.5)	183 (7.2)	357 (14.1)	414 (16.3)	333 (13.1)	309 (12.2)	289 (11.4)	285 (11.2)	253 (10.0)	166 (6.5)	3,057 (120.4)
Average rainy days	18.4	17.2	20.6	23.4	29.3	29.2	29.9	29.4	27.7	28.7	25.5	19.9	299.2
Source: Meteoblue (modeled/calculated data, not measured locally)

== Demographics ==
Population census of Taraka
Year	Pop.	±% p.a.
1918	3,471	—
1939	4,996	+1.75%
1948	9,124	+6.92%
1960	15,381	+4.45%
1970	10,644	−3.61%
1975	13,788	+5.33%
1980	13,567	−0.32%
1990	14,765	+0.85%
1995	16,505	+2.11%
2000	18,832	+2.87%
2007	28,196	+5.72%
2010	20,881	−10.35%
2015	23,644	+2.39%
2020	27,184	+2.98%
2024	29,558	+2.03%
Source: Philippine Statistics Authority

== Economy ==
Poverty Incidence of Taraka

Source: Philippine Statistics Authority
