= Mahardika Party =

- Leader: Abdulkarim Misuari; Nurredha Misuari
- President: Adib Tan Misuari
- Secretary-General: Randolph Parcasio
- Ideology: Moro self-determinism Egalitarianism
- National affiliation: Moro National Liberation Front
- Colors: Red, Green
- Slogan: Hulah, Bangsa, Agama
- House of Representatives: 0 / 8 (Bangsamoro seats only)
- Provincial governors: 0 / 6 (Bangsamoro only)
- Provincial vice governors: 0 / 6 (Bangsamoro only)
- Provincial board members: 0 / 46 (Bangsamoro regular seats only)
- Bangsamoro Parliament: 0 / 80

The Mahardika Party is a political party based in Mindanao, Philippines, which is affiliated with Nur Misuari, the founder of the Moro National Liberation Front (MNLF). It is led by Nur's children and Bangsamoro Parliament members Abdulkarim and Nurredha Misuari.

Another MNLF associated party is the Bangsamoro Party of Muslimin Sema of the Executive Council of 15.

== History ==
Mahardika Party's first official convention was held on June 25, 2024 at Cotabato City, spearheaded by Abdulkarim Misuari. It was formed as the political vehicle that is linked towards the MNLF under Nur Misuari pertaining to the participation in the upcoming Bangsamoro parliamentary elections that was supposed to be held in 2025. Also during that time, it was openly allied towards the BARMM Grand Coalition with Sulu Governor Sakur Tan as its candidate for chief minister. Nur-Ainee Tan Lim's presence in the BGC's rally in Maimbung was also acknowledged. However, the elections were suspended following the exclusion of Sulu from the Bangsamoro.

Although Abdulkarim Misuari and Nurredha Misuari are party leaders, they are not among the nominees in the upcoming Bangsamoro elections. Nur-Ainee Tan Lim, deputy minister of Ministry of Social Services and Development and one of Misuari's daughters is the first nominee of the Party.
