= Masiu =

Municipality in Lanao del Sur, Philippines

Masiu ماسيو
- Municipality
- Municipality of Masiu
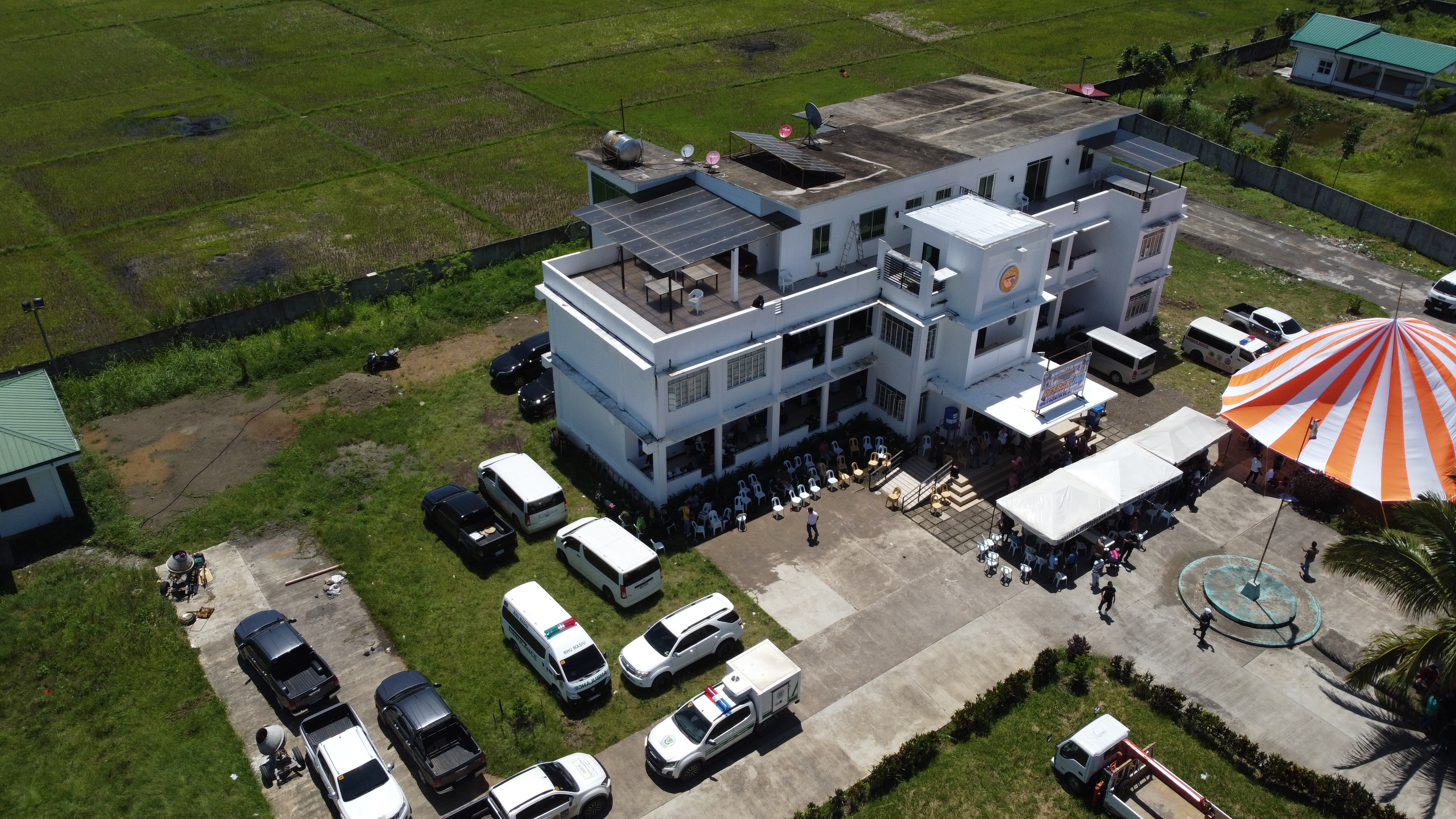
- Masiu municipal hall

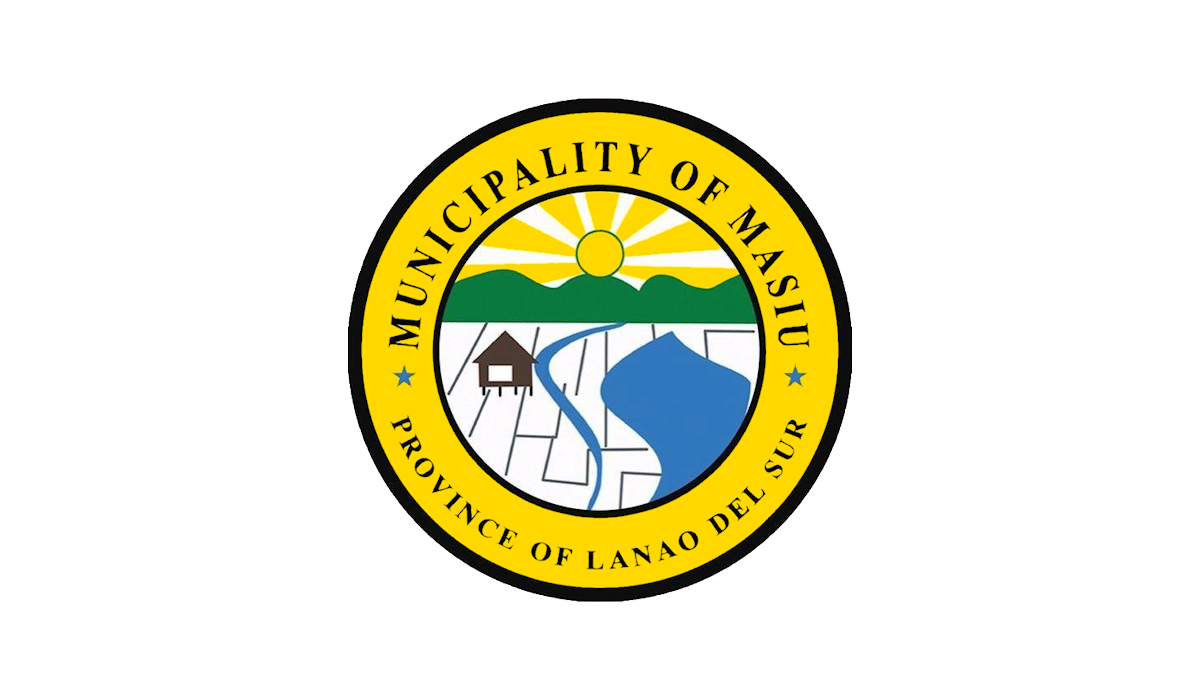
- Flag Seal
- Nickname: The True Heart of Mindanao
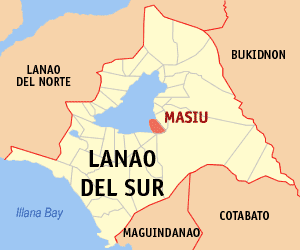
- Map of Lanao del Sur with Masiu highlighted
- Interactive map of Masiu
- Location within the Philippines
- Coordinates: 7°49′09″N 124°19′49″E
- Country: Philippines
- Region: Bangsamoro Autonomous Region in Muslim Mindanao
- Province: Lanao del Sur
- House district: 1st district
- Parliamentary district: 4th district
- Barangays: 35 (see Barangays)

Government
  - Type: Sangguniang Bayan
  - Mayor: Romil M. Guiling
  - Vice Mayor: Jadid R. Mimbantas
  - House Representative: Ziaur-Rahman A. Adiong
  - Municipal Council: Members: Mojib M. Masbud; Abduljabbar M. Mimbantas; Moner G. Arimao; Omar B. Arimao; Hosney M. Oranggaga; Alaynna G. Maca-alin; H. Sobair P. Unda; Domiangca G. Tomambiling
  - Electorate: 17,664 voters (2025)

Area
  - Total: 170.00 km^{2} (65.64 sq mi)
- Elevation: 769 m (2,523 ft)
- Highest elevation: 1,125 m (3,691 ft)
- Lowest elevation: 696 m (2,283 ft)

Population (2024 census)
  - Total: 36,803
  - Density: 216.49/km^{2} (560.70/sq mi)
  - Households: 4,963

Economy
  - Income class: 3rd municipal income class
  - Poverty incidence: 18.66% (2023)
  - Revenue: ₱ 141 million (2024)
  - Assets: ₱ 120.5 million (2024)
  - Expenditure: ₱ 142.5 million (2024)
  - Liabilities: ₱ 0 million (2022), 50 million (2024)

Service provider
  - Electricity: Lanao del Sur Electric Cooperative (LASURECO)
- Time zone: UTC+8 (PST)
- ZIP code: 9706
- PSGC: 1903618000
- IDD : area code: +63 (0)63
- Native languages: Maranao; Tagalog
- Website: www.masiu-lds.gov.ph

Masiu, officially the Municipality of Masiu (Maranao: Inged a Masiu; Tagalog: Bayan ng Masiu), is a municipality in the province of Lanao del Sur, Philippines. According to the 2024 census, it has a population of 36,803 people.

== Geography ==
Masiu is located due south of Marawi and is considered to be the geographic center of mainland Mindanao, with the extreme points located in Surigao City (north), Jose Abad Santos, Davao Occidental (south), Caraga, Davao Oriental (east) and Zamboanga City (west) respectively.

=== Barangays ===
Masiu is politically subdivided into 35 barangays. Each barangay consists of puroks while some have sitios.

- Abdullah Buisan
- Caramian Alim Raya
- Alip Lalabuan
- Alumpang Paino Mimbalay
- Mai Ditimbang Balindong
- Mai Sindaoloan Dansalan
- Buadi Amloy
- Maranat Bontalis
- Lumbaca Ingud
- Dalog Balut
- Gindolongan Alabat
- Gondarangin Asa Adigao
- Moriatao-Bai Labay
- Laila Lumbac Bacon
- Lakadun
- Lanco Dimapatoy
- Talub Langi
- Lomigis Sugod
- Macabangan Imbala
- Macadaag Talaguian
- Macalupang Lumbac Caramian
- Magayo Bagoaingud
- Macompara Apa Mimbalay
- Manalocon Talub
- Kalilangan
- Putad Marandang Buisan
- Matao Araza
- Mocamad Tangul
- Pantao
- Sambowang Atawa
- Sawir
- Tamboro Cormatan
- Tomambiling Lumbaca Ingud
- Towano Arangga
- Unda Dayawan

=== Climate ===
Climate data for Masiu, Lanao del Sur
Month	Jan	Feb	Mar	Apr	May	Jun	Jul	Aug	Sep	Oct	Nov	Dec	Year
Mean daily maximum °C (°F)	26 (79)	26 (79)	26 (79)	27 (81)	26 (79)	25 (77)	25 (77)	25 (77)	25 (77)	25 (77)	25 (77)	26 (79)	26 (78)
Mean daily minimum °C (°F)	20 (68)	20 (68)	20 (68)	21 (70)	21 (70)	21 (70)	20 (68)	20 (68)	20 (68)	20 (68)	21 (70)	20 (68)	20 (69)
Average precipitation mm (inches)	236 (9.3)	225 (8.9)	244 (9.6)	235 (9.3)	304 (12.0)	287 (11.3)	200 (7.9)	175 (6.9)	158 (6.2)	200 (7.9)	287 (11.3)	243 (9.6)	2,794 (110.2)
Average rainy days	24.3	22.3	26.0	27.2	28.3	27.2	25.8	24.8	22.2	25.4	27.2	25.8	306.5
Source: Meteoblue (modeled/calculated data, not measured locally)

== Demographics ==
Population census of Masiu
Year	Pop.	±% p.a.
1918	4,397	—
1939	5,721	+1.26%
1948	7,993	+3.79%
1960	8,903	+0.90%
1970	12,550	+3.49%
1975	15,462	+4.27%
1980	12,512	−4.14%
1990	17,030	+3.13%
1995	20,042	+3.10%
2000	24,105	+4.04%
2007	30,196	+3.16%
2010	25,181	−6.40%
2015	29,176	+2.84%
2020	33,580	+3.00%
2024	36,803	+2.22%
Source: Philippine Statistics Authority

== Economy ==
Poverty Incidence of Masiu

Source: Philippine Statistics Authority
