= BARMM Grand Coalition =

- Leader: Suharto Mangudadatu
- Founders: Mamintal Adiong Jr.; Mujiv Hataman; Sakur Tan; Mariam Mangudadatu; Suharto Mangudadatu
- Founded: April 2024
- Coalition members: Al Ittihad–UKB; Bangsamoro Peoples Party; Salaam; SIAP

The BARMM Grand Coalition is a political alliance in the Bangsamoro Autonomous Region in Muslim Mindanao (BARMM), simply known as Bangsamoro.

== History ==
The history of the BARMM Grand Coalition can be traced back to April 24, 2024, when the Bangsamoro Peoples Party (BPP), the Al Ittihad–UKB Party, and the Serbisyong Inklusibo–Alyansang Progresibo (SIAP) signed a commitment deal to form a then-unnamed coalition in Makati Salaam Party would also join the alliance.

The BGC was launched by its four member parties at the 3,700-seater Sarimanok Stadium in Marawi on April 29, 2024, which was attended by 20,000 people.

With traditional leaders and politicians from political families, the BGC touts itself as an "inclusive" alternative to the incumbent Moro Islamic Liberation Front-led regional government and its party the United Bangsamoro Justice Party who are associated with the Maranao.

On July 23, 2024, its member parties signed the Comprehensive Coalition Agreement (CCA) outlining the BGC's basic principles.

== Electoral history ==
=== 2026 Bangsamoro elections ===
The BARMM Grand Coalition will be participating at the inaugural 2026 Bangsamoro Parliament election. They endorse Sulu governor Sakur Tan's bid to get appointed as Chief Minister of Bangsamoro.

The BGC for the purpose of the election registered itself as a Regional Parliamentary Political Party (RPPP) and not as a coalition. Member parties of BGC, Al Ittihad–UKB Party and Serbisyong Inklusibo-Alyansang Progresibo Party also filed separate registrations as RPPPs. By October 2024, the BGC was accredited as a party.

== Political positions ==
=== Bangsamoro peace process ===
The BGC has committed itself to continue the Bangsamoro peace process, particularly the fulfillment of the peace deals with both the Moro Islamic Liberation Front (MILF) and the Moro National Liberation Front (MNLF). They intend to use the BARMM Special Development Fund and Block Grant to expedite the integration of both former MILF and MNLF fighters.
