= Progresibong Bangsamoro Party =

- Leader: Don Mustapha Loong
- Colors: Blue Green Red
- House of Representatives: 0 / 8 (Bangsamoro seats only)
- Provincial governors: 0 / 6 (Bangsamoro only)
- Provincial vice governors: 0 / 6 (Bangsamoro only)
- Provincial board members: 0 / 46 (Bangsamoro regular seats only)
- Bangsamoro Parliament: 1 / 80

The Progresibong Bangsamoro Party (PRO Bangsamoro or PBP; lit. 'Progressive Bangsamoro Party') is a regional political party in Bangsamoro, Philippines.

== History ==
The Progresibong Bangsamoro Party was accredited as a regional party by the Commission on Elections for the purpose of the 2026 Bangsamoro Parliament election. PRO Bangsamoro advocates for the strengthening of the political party system in the autonomous region.

== Electoral performance ==
Election	Leader	Proportional			District			Sectoral			Seats	±	Government
Election	Leader	Votes	%	Place	Votes	%	Place	Votes	%	Place	Seats	±	Government
2026	Don Mustapha Loong	36,672	1.94	5th	41,428	2.19	9th	—	—	—	1 / 80	New	TBA
