= Serbisyong Inklusibo–Alyansang Progresibo =

Serbisyong Inklusibo – Alyansang Progresibo
- Leader: Mamintal Adiong Jr.
- President: Mohammad Khalid Adiong
- Headquarters: Lanao del Sur
- National affiliation: Lakas (2007–2012; 2018–present); Liberal (2012–2018)
- Colors: Green, Gold
- House of Representatives: 2 / 8 (Bangsamoro seats only)
- Provincial governors: 1 / 6 (Bangsamoro only)
- Provincial vice governors: 1 / 6 (Bangsamoro only)
- Provincial board members: 0 / 46 (Bangsamoro regular seats only)
- Bangsamoro Parliament: 6 / 80

The Serbisyong Inklusibo–Alyansang Progresibo (lit. 'Inclusive Service–Progressive Alliance'; SIAP or the SIAP Party) is a local political party in the Philippines.

== History ==
SIAP is a political organization established in 2002 by a group of businessmen and figures involved in the Bangsamoro peace process. It was originally founded as a local political party for Lanao del Sur and is associated with its governor Mamintal Adiong Sr. who died in 2004. His son Mamintal Jr. would take over SIAP.

The party would expand to the other provinces of Bangsamoro by 2023.

In the 2025 local elections in Bangsamoro, SIAP and the United Bangsamoro Justice Party have entered a deal where UBJP will not field candidates for municipality-level executive positions in Lanao del Sur. It also took part in the 2026 Bangsamoro Parliament election as part of the BARMM Grand Coalition.
