= 2022 Basilan local elections =

Local elections in Basilan, Philippines

- Registered: 297,322
- Turnout: 75.28% ▲7.21pp
- Gubernatorial election
← 2019	May 9, 2022	2025 →
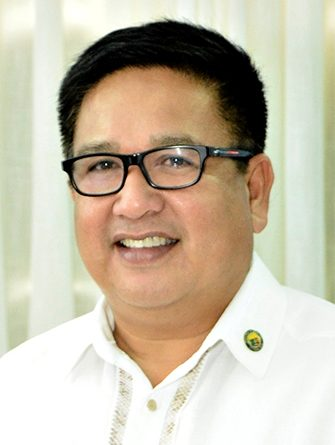

Candidate	Jim Hataman-Salliman	Alfiya Akbar
Party	PDP–Laban	Lakas
Running mate	Yusop Alano	Pai Sali
Popular vote	121,457	83,056
Percentage	59.02	40.36
Governor before election
Jim Hataman-Salliman
PDP–Laban
Elected Governor
Jim Hataman-Salliman
PDP–Laban
- Vice gubernatorial election

Candidate	Yusop Alano	Pai Sali
Party	PDP–Laban	UBJP
Popular vote	146,013	35,820
Percentage	78.52	19.26
Vice-Governor before election
Yusop Alano
PDP–Laban
Elected Vice-Governor
Yusop Alano
PDP–Laban
- Provincial Board election

8 of 12 seats in the Basilan Provincial Board 7 seats needed for a majority
	First party	Second party	Third party
Party	PDP–Laban	UBJP	BUP
Last election	7 seats	New	New
Seats won	6	1	1
Seat change	▼1	Steady	Steady
Popular vote	341,307	164,723	50,071
Percentage	51.29%	24.75%	7.52%
	Fourth party
Party	Liberal
Last election	1
Seats won	0
Seat change	▼1
Popular vote	54,896
Percentage	8.25%

Local elections were held in Basilan on May 9, 2022, as part of the 2022 Philippine general election. Voters selected candidates for all local positions: a town mayor, vice mayor, and town councilors, as well as members of the Sangguniang Panlalawigan, a vice-governor, a governor, and representatives for the province's lone congressional district in the Philippine House of Representatives.

== Provincial elections ==
=== Governor ===
Incumbent Governor Jim Hataman-Salliman ran for reelection for his third and final term Alfiya Akbar whom he ran against in 2019 as well as Walid Amiril and Ismael Garingan.

Salliman won reelection with 59% of the vote while carrying both of Basilan's cities and 9 of 11 municipalities.

Alfiya Akbar, daughter of former Governor Wahab Akbar and former Governor Jum Akbar ran and lost the gubernatorial post for the second time. She won in Akbar and Ungkaya Pukan.

Basilan Gubernatorial Election
Party	Candidate	Votes	%
PDP–Laban	Jim Hataman-Salliman (Incumbent)	121,457	59.02
Lakas	Alfiya Akbar	83,056	40.36
PDDS	Walid Amiril	630	0.30
Independent	Ismael Garingan	617	0.29
Valid ballots		205,760	91.93
Invalid or blank votes		17,735	7.33
Total votes		223,811	100.00
PDP–Laban hold			

==== By city/municipality ====
Municipality	Salliman		Akbar		Amiril		Garingan		Total votes
Municipality	Votes	%	Votes	%	Votes	%	Votes	%	Total votes
Akbar	684	11.58	5,219	88.36	3	0.05	0	0.00	5,906
Al-Barka	4,077	51.00	3,871	48.42	36	0.45	9	0.11	7,993
Hadji Mohammad Ajul	7,079	74.78	2,352	24.84	24	0.25	11	0.11	9,466
Hadji Muhtamad	4,905	69.65	2,086	29.62	31	0.44	20	0.29	7,042
Isabela	25,486	51.47	23,570	47.60	189	0.38	264	0.53	49,509
Lamitan	26,355	69.55	11,234	29.64	156	0.41	145	0.38	37,890
Lantawan	6,221	51.43	5,748	47.52	50	0.41	76	0.62	12,095
Maluso	14,835	71.76	5,712	27.63	64	0.30	60	0.29	20,671
Sumisip	13,429	74.05	4,672	25.76	33	0.18	1	0.00	18,135
Tabuan-Lasa	7,133	51.09	6,824	48.88	1	0.00	1	0.00	13,959
Tipo-Tipo	5,018	51.32	4,709	48.16	27	0.27	23	0.23	9,777
Tuburan	3,598	65.63	1,879	34.27	5	0.09	0	0.00	5,482
Ungkaya Pukan	2,637	33.65	5,180	66.11	11	0.14	7	0.08	7,835
Total	121,457	59.02	83,056	40.36	630	0.30	617	0.29	205,760

=== Vice Governor ===
Incumbent Vice Governor Yusop Alano ran for reelection for his third and final term against incumbent Second District Sangguniang Panlalawigan member Pai Sali as well as Rahma Jamiri and Majid Abdil.

Alano won reelection with 79% of the vote while carrying both of Basilan's cities and 10 of 11 municipalities. Meanwhile, Pai Sali carried the municipality of Akbar.

Basilan Vice Gubernatorial Election
Party	Candidate	Votes	%
PDP–Laban	Yusop Alano (Incumbent)	146,013	78.52
UBJP	Pai Sali	35,820	19.26
Independent	Rahma Jamiri	2,069	1.11
Independent	Majid Abdil	2,045	1.09
Valid ballots		185,947	83.08
Invalid or blank votes		37,548	16.78
Total votes		223,811	100.00
PDP–Laban hold			

==== By city/municipality ====
Municipality	Alano		Sali		Jamiri		Abdil		Total votes
Municipality	Votes	%	Votes	%	Votes	%	Votes	%	Total votes
Akbar	658	11.47	5,050	88.08	19	0.33	6	0.10	5,733
Al-Barka	4,664	64.83	2,451	34.07	42	0.48	37	0.51	7,194
Hadji Mohammad Ajul	7,145	82.49	1,372	15.84	89	1.02	55	0.63	8,661
Hadji Muhtamad	5,975	93.76	232	3.64	83	1.30	82	1.28	6,372
Isabela	39,408	87.02	4,149	9.16	916	2.02	810	1.78	45,283
Lamitan	27,290	80.37	5,781	17.02	494	1.45	389	1.14	33,954
Lantawan	9,484	82.93	1,782	15.58	75	0.65	95	0.83	11,436
Maluso	14,666	87.43	1,644	9.80	186	1.10	278	1.65	16,774
Sumisip	12,866	77.93	3,443	20.85	63	0.38	137	0.82	16,509
Tabuan-Lasa	8,691	64.56	4,758	35.34	5	0.03	7	0.05	13,461
Tipo-Tipo	5,710	67.18	2,660	31.29	48	0.56	81	0.95	8,499
Tuburan	4,432	87.57	607	11.99	11	0.21	11	0.21	5,061
Ungkaya Pukan	5,024	71.66	1,891	26.97	38	0.54	57	0.81	7,010
Total	146,013	78.52	35,820	19.26	2,069	1.11	2,045	0.09	185,947

=== Sangguniang Panlalawigan ===
Incumbents are italicized.

Party	Votes	%	Seats
Partido Demokratiko Pilipino-Lakas ng Bayan	341,307	51.29	6
United Bangsamoro Justice Party	164,723	24.75	1
Basilan Unity Party	50,071	7.52	1
Liberal Party	54,896	8.25	0
Independent	54,487	8.19	0
Ex officio seats			4
Total	665,484	100.00	12

==== 1st District ====
- City: Isabela
- Municipalities: Hadji Muhtamad, Lantawan, Maluso

Nasser Salain, Moumar Muarip, and Allet Ismael ran for reelection and defended their seats. Aina Ismael ran and lost her seat to Amin Hataman, son of incumbent Representative Mujiv Hataman and Isabela City Mayor Dadah Hataman. Allet Ismael and Aina Ismael switched party affiliation and defected from PDP-Laban to UBJP.

Basilan 1st District Sangguniang Panlalawigan election
Party	Candidate	Votes	%
PDP–Laban	Nasser Salain	53,035	53.78
BUP	Amin Hataman	50,071	50.77
PDP–Laban	Moumar Muarip	45,833	46.47
UBJP	Allet Ismael	39,449	40.00
UBJP	Aina Ismael	33,991	34.47
PDP–Laban	Rosebell Sanson	32,951	33.41
Independent	Jenny Tubongbanua	17,978	18.23
Independent	Omar Akbar	16,313	16.54
Liberal	Danny Sahi	7,328	7.43
Independent	Asimin Sarikin	1,936	1.96
Independent	Wheng Taberoa	818	0.83
Valid ballots		98,623	100

==== 2nd District ====
- City: Lamitan
- Municipalities: Akbar, Al Barka, Hadji Mohammad Ajul, Sumisip, Tabuan-Lasa, Tipo-Tipo, Tuburan, Ungkaya Pukan

Incumbent board members Nasser Asarul and Monsoy Aramil ran for reelection and defended their seats. Jay Salliman, son of incumbent Governor Jim Hataman-Salliman, was the highest voted candidate. Former board member, Marwan Hataman, was elected once again to his old post after unsuccessfully running for councilor in Sumisip in 2019. Hadjaria Hataman did not run for reelection.

Basilan 2nd District Sangguniang Panlalawigan election
Party	Candidate	Votes	%
PDP–Laban	Jay Salliman	57,289	45.76
PDP–Laban	Marwan Hataman	53,003	42.34
PDP–Laban	Monsoy Aramil	50,693	40.49
PDP–Laban	Nasser Asarul	48,503	38.74
Liberal	Durie Kallahal	47,568	38.00
UBJP	Yeh Sali	40,594	32.43
UBJP	Hadji Kasim Idris	28,300	22.61
UBJP	Hamdie Majirul	22,389	17.88
Independent	Madz Abdulla	11,135	8.89
Independent	Ibnohair Akalun	2,805	2.24
Independent	Bert Reyes	2,138	1.71
Independent	Jalil Shing	1,364	1.09
Valid ballots		125,188	100

== Congressional elections ==
Incumbent Representative Mujiv Hataman ran and was reelected for his second term. He faced Yasmeen Junaid as well as Abdulhan Jaujohn and Mohammad Alih Samiun.

Hataman carried both of Basilan's cities and 11 of 13 of its municipalities, garnering 68% of the vote. Junaid won in Akbar and Ungkaya Pukan while narrowly losing in her hometown of Tabuan-Lasa.

Philippine House of Representatives election in Basilan's Lone District
Party	Candidate	Votes	%
BUP	Mujiv Hataman (Incumbent)	137,976	67.57
UBJP	Yasmeen Junaid	64,555	31.61
Independent	Abdulhan Jaujohn	874	0.42
PDDS	Mohammad Alih Samiun	790	0.38
Valid ballots		204,195	91.24
Invalid or blank votes		19,300	8.62
Total votes		223,811	100.00
BUP hold			

=== By city/municipality ===
Municipality	Hataman		Junaid		Jaujohn		Samiun		Total votes
Municipality	Votes	%	Votes	%	Votes	%	Votes	%	Total votes
Akbar	748	12.75	5,109	87.09	5	0.08	4	0.06	5,866
Al-Barka	4,628	60.37	2,966	38.69	26	0.33	46	0.60	7,666
Hadji Mohammad Ajul	8,120	86.86	1,182	12.64	25	0.22	21	0.26	9,348
Hadji Muhtamad	5,980	82.58	1,187	16.39	26	0.35	48	0.66	7,241
Isabela	28,877	58.31	20,082	40.55	341	0.68	218	0.44	49,518
Lamitan	31,201	84.18	5,519	14.89	155	0.41	189	0.50	37,064
Lantawan	7,344	61.05	4,600	38.24	56	0.46	28	0.23	12,028
Maluso	16,315	77.45	4,582	21.75	91	0.43	76	0.36	21,064
Sumisip	14,346	78.84	3,767	20.70	50	0.27	32	0.17	18,195
Tabuan-Lasa	7,189	50.76	6,964	49.18	3	0.02	4	0.02	14,160
Tipo-Tipo	6,130	66.51	2,983	32.36	53	0.57	50	0.254	9,216
Tuburan	3,908	72.58	1,458	27.08	6	0.11	12	0.22	5,384
Ungkaya Pukan	3,190	42.84	4,156	55.82	37	0.49	62	0.83	7,445
Total	137,976	67.57	64,555	31.61	874	0.42	790	0.38	204,195
