= Basilan Provincial Board =

Legislative body of the province of Basilan, Philippines

Basilan Provincial Board Sangguniang Panlalawigan ng Basilan

Type
- Type: Unicameral
- Term limits: 3 terms (9 years)

Leadership
- Presiding Officer: Hadjiman Hataman Salliman, PFP since June 30, 2025

Structure
- Seats: 14 board members 1 ex officio presiding officer
- Political groups: PFP (5) BUP (3) Lakas (1) Independent (1) Nonpartisan (3) Vacancy (1)
- Length of term: 3 years
- Authority: Local Government Code of the Philippines

Elections
- Voting system: Plurality-at-large (regular members); Indirect election (ex officio members); Acclamation (sectoral member)
- Last election: May 12, 2025
- Next election: May 8, 2028

Meeting place
- Basilan Provincial Capitol, Isabela

The Basilan Provincial Board is the Sangguniang Panlalawigan (provincial legislature) of the Philippine province of Basilan.

The members are elected via plurality-at-large voting: the province is divided into two districts, with the first having four seats and the second having six seats. A voter votes up to four names in the first district and up to six names in the second district; the top candidates are then elected to fill the seats assigned to each district. The vice governor is the ex officio presiding officer, and only votes to break ties. The vice governor is elected via the plurality voting system province-wide.

Aside from the regular members, the board also includes the provincial federation presidents of the Liga ng mga Barangay (ABC, from its old name "Association of Barangay Captains"), the Sangguniang Kabataan (SK, youth councils) and the Philippine Councilors League (PCL) as ex officio members. They join the board once they are elected as president of their respective league or federation shortly after the start of their terms following the regular local elections (in the case of PCL) or the barangay and SK elections (in the case of ABC and SK).

In addition, the province's indigenous peoples community sends to the board a sectoral member, the Indigenous Peoples Mandatory Representative (IPMR), in accordance with national guidelines set by the National Commission on Indigenous Peoples pursuant to Republic Act No. 8371, as well as with local guidelines agreed upon by the IP community.

== District apportionment ==
The districts used in the appropriation of members is not coextensive with the legislative district of Basilan. Unlike congressional representation which is at-large, Basilan is divided into two districts for representation in the Sangguniang Panlalawigan, with the western part of the province (Isabela City, Hadji Muhtamad, Lantawan, and Maluso) constituting the first district, and the eastern part (Lamitan City, Akbar, Al-Barka, Hadji Mohammad Ajul, Sumisip, Tabuan-Lasa, Tipo-Tipo, Tuburan, and Ungkaya Pukan) forming the second district.

Voters in Isabela City, which is administratively separate from Basilan, are allowed to vote for provincial officials, including for 1st district board member.

In 2025, the second district gained two additional seats after the Department of Finance upgraded the province's income classification to 1st class, from 3rd class.

Elections	No. of seats per district		Ex officio seats	Sectoral seat	Total seats
Elections	1st	2nd	Ex officio seats	Sectoral seat	Total seats
1992–1998	3	3	3	1	10
1998–2025	4	4	3	1	12
2025–present	4	6	3	1	14

== List of members ==
=== Current members ===
These are the members after the 2023 barangay and SK elections and the 2025 local elections.

The names of regular members are listed in order of their rank in the local election in their respective district.

- Vice Governor: Hadjiman Hataman Salliman (PFP)

Seat	Board member	Party	Term number	Start of term	End of term
1st district	Nasser Salain	PFP	3	June 30, 2019	June 30, 2028
1st district	Ahmad Ali Ismael	PFP	3	June 30, 2019	June 30, 2028
1st district	Ahmed Ibn Djaliv Hataman	BUP	2	June 30, 2022	June 30, 2028
1st district	Faigdar Jaafar	BUP	1	June 30, 2025	June 30, 2028
2nd district	Khazmhir Asarul	PFP	1	June 30, 2025	June 30, 2028
2nd district	Nur-Khan Istarul	PFP	1	June 30, 2025	June 30, 2028
2nd district	Keemhar Jay Sakkalahul	PFP	1	June 30, 2025	June 30, 2028
2nd district	Ronie Hantian	BUP	1	June 30, 2025	June 30, 2028
2nd district	Nur-In Akbar	Lakas	1	June 30, 2025	June 30, 2028
2nd district	Juhan Hataman	Independent	1	June 30, 2025	June 30, 2028
ABC	Sarib Hataman	Nonpartisan	TBD		January 1, 2026
PCL	Vacant (Note: Vacant pending the election of a new set of officers of the province's Philippine Councilors League.)				
SK	Hunain Atahal	Nonpartisan	1	November 2023	January 1, 2026
IPMR	Datu Ansar Gadja	Nonpartisan	1	July 31, 2023	July 31, 2026

== Past members ==
=== Vice Governor ===
Election year	Name	Party
1992	Ping Kasim	LDP
1995	Ping Kasim	Lakas
1998	Bonnie Balamo	LAMMP
2001	Lukman Ampao	Independent
2004	Al-Rasheed Ahmad Sakkalahul	Aksyon
2007	Al-Rasheed Ahmad Sakkalahul	Liberal
2010	Al-Rasheed Ahmad Sakkalahul	Lakas–Kampi
2013	Keemhar Jay Sakkalahul	Liberal
2016	Yusop Alano	NPC
2019	Yusop Alano	PDP–Laban
2022	Yusop Alano	PDP–Laban
2025	Hadjiman Hataman Salliman	PFP

=== 1st District ===
- City: Isabela
- Municipalities: Hadji Muhtamad, Lantawan, Maluso
- Population (2020): 234,016

Election year	Member (party)	Member (party)	Member (party)	Member (party)
1992	Eddie "Otoh" Fernandez (NPC)	Perfecto Antonio, Jr. (NPC)	Cesar Yu (Liberal)	—
1995	Sakiran Hajan (LDP)	Miskuddin Tupay (Lakas–NUCD)	Susan Yu (Lakas–NUCD)	—
1998	Otoh Fernandez (LAMMP)	Perfecto Antonio, Jr. (LAMMP)	Susan Yu (LAMMP)	Gregorio dela Peña III (Lakas–NUCD)
2001	Otoh Fernandez (PMP)	Perfecto Antonio, Jr. (PMP)	Susan Yu (PMP)	Jainal Ajibun (Lakas–NUCD)
2004	Otoh Fernandez (Lakas)	Moumar Muarip (Lakas)	Taib Alejo (Liberal)	Placido Jilhani (Lakas)
2007	Yusop Alano (Liberal)	Candu Muarip (Liberal)	Miskuddin Tupay (Lakas)	Placido Jilhani (Liberal)
2010	Yusop Alano (Lakas-Kampi)	Candu Muarip (Lakas-Kampi)	Miskuddin Tupay (Lakas-Kampi)	Otoh Fernandez (Liberal)
2013	Yusop Alano (Liberal)	Candu Muarip (Liberal)	Alfiya Fernandez (Liberal)	Otoh Fernandez (Liberal)
2016	Aina Ismael (Independent)	Moumar Muarip (Independent)	Alfiya Fernandez (Independent)	Otoh Fernandez (Independent)
2019	Aina Ismael (PDP–Laban)	Moumar Muarip (PDP–Laban)	Nasser Salain (Liberal)	Ahmad Ali Ismael (PDP–Laban)
2022	Ahmed Ibn Djaliv Hataman (BUP)	Moumar Muarip (PDP–Laban)	Nasser Salain (PDP–Laban)	Ahmad Ali Ismael (UBJP)
2025	Ahmed Ibn Djaliv Hataman (BUP)	Faigdar Jaafar (BUP)	Nasser Salain (PFP)	Ahmad Ali Ismael (PFP)

=== 2nd District ===
- City: Lamitan
- Municipalities: Akbar, Al-Barka, Hadji Mohammad Ajul, Sumisip, Tabuan-Lasa, Tipo-Tipo, Tuburan, Ungkaya Pukan
- Population (2020): 322,570

Election year	Member (party)	Member (party)	Member (party)	Member (party)	Member (party)	Member (party)
1992	Mario Mamang (PMP)	Hunasil Asmawil (Lakas–NUCD)	Alexander Estabillo (Liberal)	—	—	
1995	Bonnie Balamo (Lakas–NUCD)	Mohammad B. Abdullah (LDP)	Andriel Asarul (LDP)	—	—	
1998	Hadji Rifai Ricardo Boga (LAMMP)	Jubaira Said (LAMMP)	Andriel Asarul (Lakas–NUCD)	Nato Asmawil (Lakas–NUCD)	—	
2001	Noel Baul (Lakas–NUCD)	Jubaira Said (PMP)	Abdulmuhmin Mujahid (PDSP)	Nasser Salain (LDP)	—	
2004	Alton Angeles (Lakas)	Jubaira Said (Lakas)	Abdulmuhmin Mujahid (Lakas)	Ronie Hantian (PMP)	—	
2007	Abdulatip Tahajid (Lakas)	Munap Pacio (Lakas)	Nasser Salain (Lakas)	Ronie Hantian (Liberal)	—	
2010	Bon Salain (Independent)	Munap Pacio (Lakas-Kampi)	Andriel Asarul (Nacionalista)	Ronie Hantian (Lakas-Kampi)	—	
2013	Abdulatip Tahajid (Liberal)	Munap Pacio (Liberal)	Paisal Sali (Liberal)	Marwan Hataman (Liberal)	—	
2016	Nasser Asarul (Independent)	Abdurasil Aramil (Independent)	Paisal Sali (Independent)	Marwan Hataman (Independent)	—	
2019	Nasser Asarul (PDP–Laban)	Abdurasil Aramil (PDP–Laban)	Paisal Sali (PDP–Laban)	Hadjaria Hataman (PDP–Laban)	—	
2022	Nasser Asarul (PDP–Laban)	Abdurasil Aramil (PDP–Laban)	Jimael Salam Hataman-Salliman (PDP–Laban)	Marwan Hataman (PDP–Laban)	—	
2025	Khazmhir Asarul (PFP)	Nur-Khan Istarul (PFP)	Keemhar Jay Sakkalahul (PFP)	Ronie Hantian (BUP)	Nur-In Akbar (Lakas)	Juhan Hataman (Independent)

=== Liga ng mga Barangay member ===
Election year	ABC/LB President	Barangay Captain of
2018	Sarib Hataman	Bgy. Buli-buli, Sumisip
2023	Sarib Hataman	Bgy. Buli-buli, Sumisip

=== Philippine Councilors League member ===
Election year	PCL President	Councilor in
2019	Jhaber Kallahal (PDP–Laban)	Tuburan
2022	Abdulsamie Kallahal (PDP–Laban)	Tuburan
2025		

=== Sangguniang Kabataan member ===
Election year	SK President	SK Chairperson of
2018	Omair Jairatul	
2023	Hunain Atahal	

=== Indigenous Peoples Mandatory Representative ===
Year	IP Representative
2017	Masid Yacob
2023	Datu Ansar Gadja
