= Lamitan =

Capital city of Basilan, Philippines

Lamitan لميتن
- City of Lamitan
- Lamitan City Hall

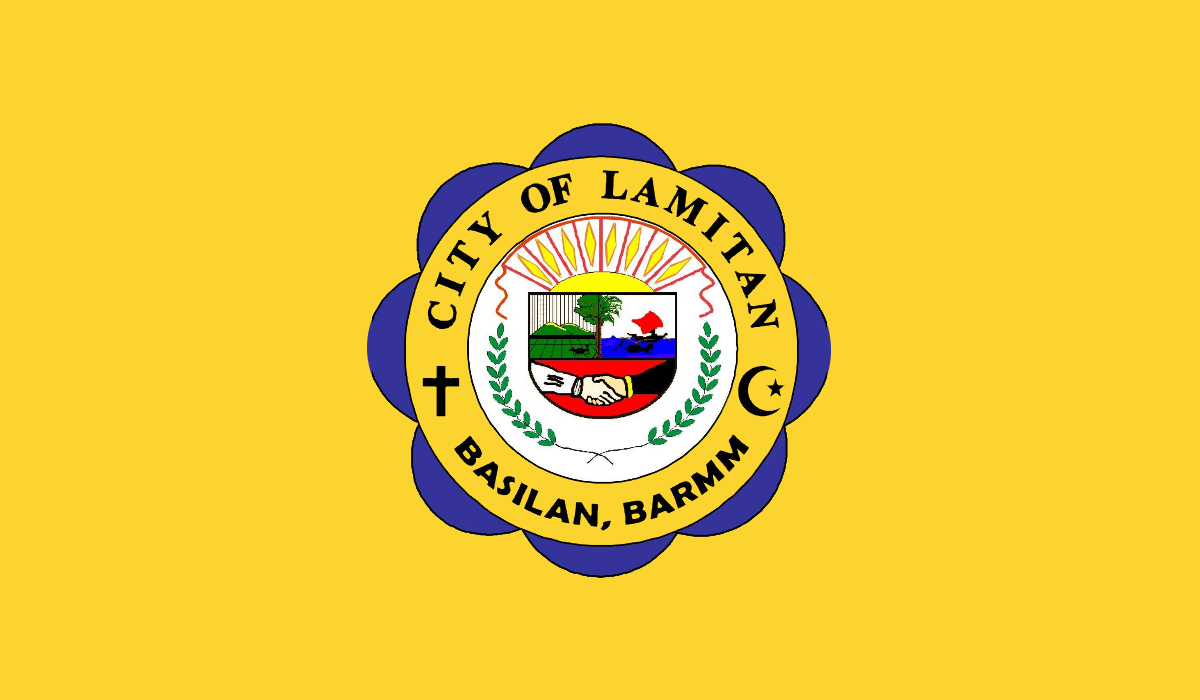
- Flag Seal
- Motto(s): Lamitan Kong Mahal (Lamitan, My Love)
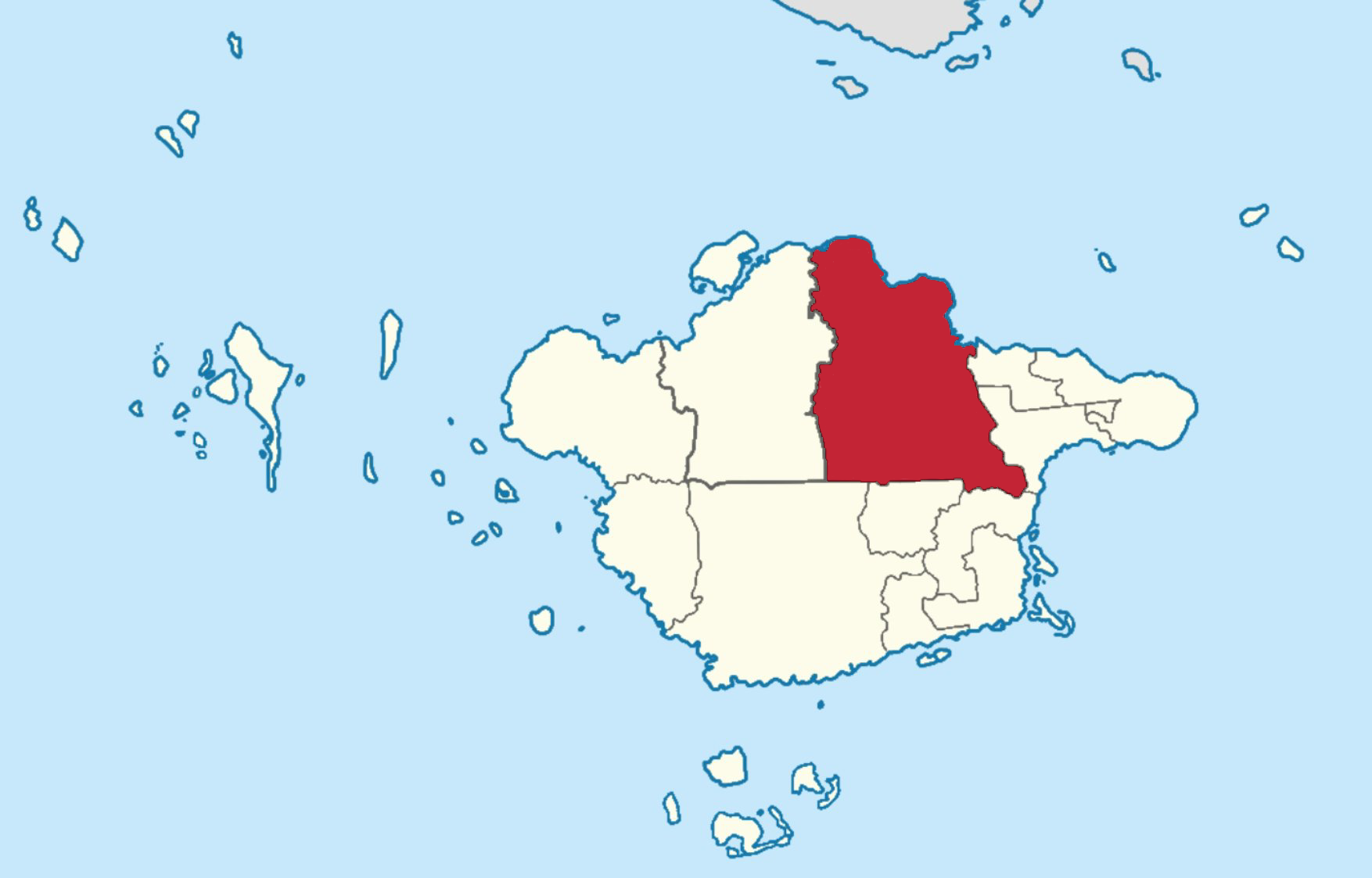
- Map of Basilan with Lamitan highlighted
- Interactive map of Lamitan
- Location within the Philippines
- Coordinates: 6°39′30″N 122°08′45″E
- Country: Philippines
- Region: Bangsamoro Autonomous Region in Muslim Mindanao
- Province: Basilan
- House district: Lone district
- Parliamentary district: 1st district
- Founded: 1886
- Cityhood: June 8, 2007 (Lost cityhood in 2008 and 2010)
- Affirmed Cityhood: February 15, 2011
- Named for: Lami-Lamihan
- Barangays: 45 (see Barangays)

Government
  - Type: Sangguniang Panlungsod
  - Mayor: Roderick H. Furigay
  - Vice Mayor: Hegem C. Furigay
  - House Representative: Mujiv S. Hataman
  - City Council: Members: Kennybel P. Flores; Arleigh W. Eisma; Erwin B. Cervantes; Regine M. Antonio; Nur-in A. Akbar; Ibrahim H. Hassan Jr.; Abubakar K. Gunong; Enrico Jay C. Dalipe; Ajid O. Dalawis; Joaquin P. Puri Jr.
  - Electorate: 51,524 voters (2025)

Area
  - Total: 354.45 km^{2} (136.85 sq mi)
- Elevation: 118 m (387 ft)
- Highest elevation: 996 m (3,268 ft)
- Lowest elevation: 0 m (0 ft)

Population (2024 census)
  - Total: 116,652
  - Density: 329.11/km^{2} (852.38/sq mi)
  - Households: 19,353

Economy
  - Income class: 3rd city income class
  - Poverty incidence: 27.2% (2023)
  - Revenue: ₱ 932.7 million (2024)
  - Assets: ₱ 1,806 million (2024)
  - Expenditure: ₱ 783.8 million (2024)
  - Liabilities: ₱ 813.1 million (2024)

Service provider
  - Electricity: Basilan Electric Cooperative (BASELCO)
- Time zone: UTC+8 (PST)
- ZIP code: 7302
- PSGC: 150702000
- IDD : area code: +63 (0)62
- Native languages: Chavacano; Yakan; Tagalog
- Website: lamitancity.gov.ph

Lamitan, officially the City of Lamitan, (Note: Chavacano: Ciudad de Lamitan; Yakan: Siyudad Lamitanin; Tausūg: Dāira sin Lamitan; Filipino: Lungsod ng Lamitan) is a component city and capital of the province of Basilan, Philippines. According to the 2024 census, it has a population of 116,652 people.

The city is bordered on the east by the municipality of Tuburan, on the south by Tipo-Tipo, on the west by Isabela and on the north by Basilan Strait.

== Etymology ==
Lamitan is derived from the word Lami-Lamihan, which signifies a combination of Merrymaking and Conference. The town was named after the first Spaniards from Isabela who blew up the area. When the Spaniards arrived, the Yakan people were celebrating their national holiday. The explorers asked for the name of the place; the Yakan assumed they were asking about the merrymaking and explained that it was the Lami-Lamihan celebration; the Spaniards misunderstood their response and later referred to the location as Lamitan.

== History ==
=== Early history ===
According to royal genealogical records, colonial accounts, and modern historical scholarship, Basilan, historically known as Taguima, developed as an important regional trade center in the precolonial period. Its strategic position between the Sulu Archipelago, northern Borneo, and mainland Southeast Asia placed Taguima at the intersection of major maritime trade and migration routes. The authority of Datu Taguima reflects the island’s early political importance and active participation in regional commerce.

The inhabitants of Taguima, known as the Tagimaha, formed a coastal and inland farming community engaged in seafaring, trade, agriculture, and regional diplomacy. Unlike societies divided between separate maritime and inland peoples, the Tagimaha exercised authority across both coastal and interior zones of Basilan. The absence of a strong pre-existing hill population comparable to the Buranun of Jolo allowed Tagimaha settlement and control to extend across the island without sustained internal resistance. This unified control established Taguima as a center of economic exchange, cultural interaction, and early political organization within the Sulu region.

By the 7th to 8th centuries, Champa (Orang Dampuan) traders from mainland Southeast Asia maintained sustained commercial and social contact with Taguima through established maritime trade networks. These Cham merchants formed settlements, intermarried with Tagimaha communities, and introduced advanced maritime knowledge, boat-building techniques, textile production, decorative weaving styles, and social practices. This long-term interaction produced a culturally integrated Tagimaha society that combined indigenous Basilan traditions with Cham maritime and artistic influences, reinforcing Basilan’s role as a regional trade hub.

Between the 9th and 12th centuries, violent conflict erupted in Sulu between the indigenous Buranun and Champa (Orang Dampuan) merchants over control of trade and economic power. Historical accounts and Sulu oral traditions record a massacre in which many Orang Dampuan traders were killed. Survivors fled Sulu, with a significant number resettling in Taguima (Basilan) among the Tagimaha. This migration strengthened demographic ties, reinforced existing trade networks, and deepened Cham cultural influence in Basilan.

By the 10th to 13th centuries, Islam expanded in Basilan and the wider Sulu region through Muslim merchants and missionaries, including scholars associated with Champa. These figures reinforced Islamic beliefs, legal concepts, and communal practices among both coastal and inland Tagimaha communities. Islam in Basilan developed through trade and missionary activity prior to and independent of the formal establishment of the Sulu Sultanate, making the Tagimaha among the earliest Muslim communities in the southern Philippines.

As Tagimaha political and commercial influence expanded, segments of the population moved from Basilan into Buansa (Jolo). There, Tagimaha leaders functioned as the principal local political authority. They provided protection, territorial access, and legitimacy to Muslim teachers such as Karimul Makdum, enabling the open establishment of Islamic instruction and early mosques. They later supported Tuan Masha’ikha, integrating Islamic practices into elite governance. When Raja Baguinda arrived in Buansa, he initially faced resistance from the Tagimaha. This resistance ended when Tagimaha leaders recognized that he spoke a closely related West Malay language, reflecting shared cultural and political traditions. The Tagimaha accepted him, granted political legitimacy, and strengthened his position through marriage into a ruling family linked to Tagimaha lineage. With their backing, Raja Baguinda consolidated leadership in Buansa.

Within the political structure of the Sulu Sultanate, Tagimaha elites became the Mantin, serving as chief ministers and principal advisers to the Sultan. Through control of administration, diplomacy, and elite alliances, they formed a central pillar of early Sulu governance and laid the institutional foundations that later evolved into the Sulu Sultanate.

As the Sulu Sultanate consolidated power, regional trade and political authority became increasingly centered in Buansa (Jolo), reducing Basilan’s earlier prominence as a major maritime trading hub. Basilan’s economy shifted toward inland agriculture, localized production, and resource-based livelihoods. This transition marked a shift from long-distance trade participation to a more locally oriented economic landscape.

Historical records indicate that Sultanate authority remained concentrated in coastal political centers, while inland communities in Taguima (Basilan) retained substantial autonomy. These communities maintained their own systems of leadership, communal governance, and customary law, continuing earlier Basilan social organization without close integration into Sultanate administration.

The Tagimaha thus followed two historical paths. One group settled in Buansa (Jolo), where they became integrated into elite political lineages as Mantin and ruling advisers within the Sulu Sultanate. The other group remained in Taguima (Basilan), where they continued as a distinct people and did not follow the political fortunes of the Sultanate as closely as their brothers in Buansa. Preserving older West Malay linguistic, cultural, and social characteristics, these Basilan Tagimaha gradually became known as the Yakan population.

Today, anthropological and historical studies consistently recognize Yakan culture as a continuation of earlier Tagimaha society, shaped by long-term Cham contact and indigenous Basilan heritage. This continuity is evident in weaving traditions, settlement patterns, social organization, and oral histories linked to precolonial trade networks.

Yakan's home base was in the area that would become known as Lamitan.

=== Colonization era ===
During the Spanish colonial period, The name was locally pronounced as Tagimaha (tah-gee-mah-HAH). Spanish listeners recorded it as Tagihamas (tah-gee-HAH-mahs), likely through intermediaries during trade and military encounters, and later copying and misspelling produced forms such as Sameacas (sah-meh-AH-kahs). These repeated changes indicate that Spanish authorities never had consistent knowledge or firm control over the area, which remained contested by multiple Moro polities that resisted Spanish incursions and limited sustained colonial presence.

During the American colonial period, Americans inherited distorted Spanish spellings such as "Sameacas". Upon hearing the local pronunciation "ya/ya-can", they re-spelled the name using English phonetics as "Yacanes" retaining the Spanish plural ending "-es" common in ethnic group designations of the era. This form was later standardized into the singular endonym "Yakan".

During the Spanish, American, and Japanese occupations, the town was designated as one of Basilan's municipal districts, which were then part of Zamboanga.

Pedro "Datu Kalun" Javier Cuevas is regarded as the founding father of Lamitan. He was born to Sebastian Cuevas and Gregoria Javier on May 6, 1845, in Bacoor, Cavite. He was sentenced to death at the age of 27 for his anti-Spanish efforts during the Cavite Uprising of 1872, along with two other comrades. They were accused of causing the death of a Spanish Guardia Civil officer. His sentence was reduced to life in prison due to his indirect involvement in the killing.

In June 1886, a man named Pedro Javier Cuevas, also known as Datu Kalun in Basilan history, took over leadership from the native chieftains and founded the settlement of Lamitan. The settlement grew into a town with political boundaries that included the Guiong River in the southeast and the Balagtasan River in the northwest. With the passage of time, an influx of Christian settlers arrived, who, along with their Muslim neighbors, paved the path for agricultural development in the region.

In 1937, Lamitan became part of Zamboanga City. Basilan became a chartered city on July 1, 1948, as a result of Republic Act No. 288, which was sponsored by Congressman Juan S. Alano.

=== Establishment ===
On December 27, 1973, President Ferdinand E. Marcos signed the Presidential Decree No. 356, which established Basilan Province out of Basilan City and included three municipalities: Lamitan, Isabela and Maluso. The decree reduced Basilan City's territory to less than a square kilometer. On December 2, 1974, Presidential No. 593 revised 356 to increase the territory of Basilan City to nearly three square kilometers and divide the province into ten municipalities: Lamitan, Isabela, Maluso, Sumisip, Lantawan, Tuburan, Tipo-Tipo, Tapiantana, Malamawi, and Pilas.

Col. Tomas G. Naquil, commander of the 2/1 Brigade stationed in Basilan at the time, was named the first Military Governor. After nearly two years, Rear Admiral Romulo Espaldon, commander of the South West Command (SOWESCOM), took over as Military Governor, but the affairs of government were managed by a military caretaker, Col. Florencio E. Magsino, who was succeeded by Col. Alfeo Rillera, all Brigade Commanders. This was the situation before President Marcos appointed Hon. Asan Camlian, the then-vice governor, to Governor of Basilan Province.

Basilan City was disbanded on December 11, 1975, by virtue of the Presidential Decree No. 840, which reduced the number of municipalities of Basilan Province from ten to seven, removing Tapiantana, Pilas, and Malamawi. Pedro C. Pamaran, a member of the provincial board was appointed in 1975, as Municipal Mayor of Lamitan. Wilfredo C. Furigay succeeded Pamaran in 1980. Furigay was considered the first elected mayor of the municipality of Lamitan.

In 1986, during the EDSA Revolution, Ramon F. Garcia Jr. was appointed as Mayor during the interim government. By 1988, Wilfredo C. Furigay had taken the position of mayor by way of election and was succeeded by Inocente J. Ramos in 1995 for three consecutive terms.

=== Cityhood ===
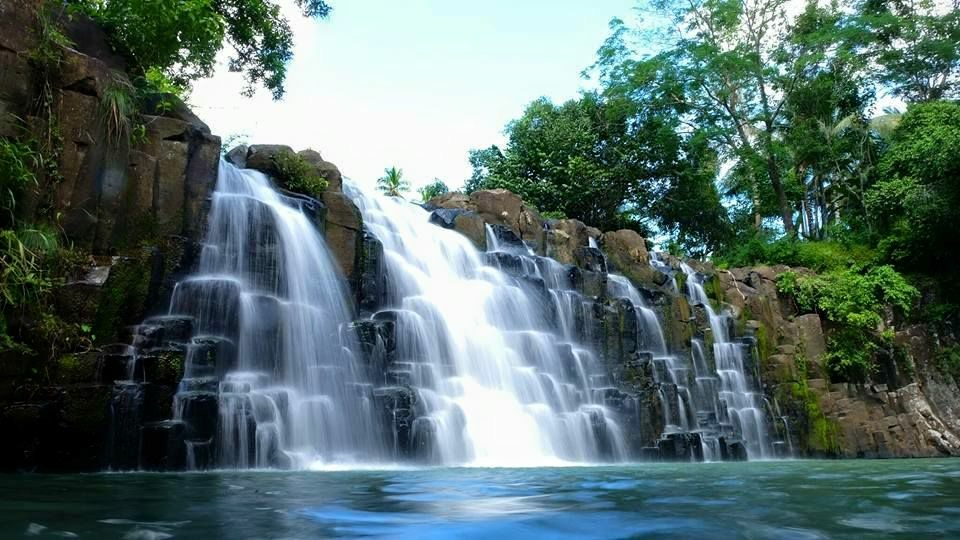
Bulingan Falls

In 2004, Roderick H. Furigay, the nephew of former mayor Wilfredo C. Furigay, was elected as the Local Chief Executive and served for two terms. He revived the Lamiteños' desire of converting the municipality into a component city.

On June 18, 2007, electorates in Lamitan ratified Republic Act No. 9393 which sought to convert the town into a component city. There were a total of 26,636 yes votes while only 177 voted against the move.

The Supreme Court declared the cityhood law of Lamitan and 15 other cities unconstitutional after a petition filed by the League of Cities of the Philippines in its ruling on November 18, 2008. On December 22, 2009, the cityhood law of Lamitan and 15 other municipalities regained their status as cities again after the court reversed its ruling on November 18, 2008. On August 23, 2010, the court reinstated its ruling on November 18, 2008, causing Lamitan and 15 cities to become regular municipalities. On February 15, 2011, Lamitan became a city again along with the 15 municipalities, as it was declared that the conversion to cityhood met all legal requirements.

After six years of legal battle, in its board resolution, the League of Cities of the Philippines acknowledged and recognized the cityhood of Lamitan and 15 other cities.

=== Contemporary ===
In July 2016, the Basilan provincial government broke ground for the construction of the new provincial capitol inside the defunct 4,000-hectare (9,900-acre) University of the Philippines (UP) Land Grant in Barangay Santa Clara.

In July 2022, Lamitan gained national attention when former mayor Rose Furigay, who had served as the city's mayor from 2013 to June 2022, was assassinated in a mass shooting at the Ateneo de Manila University where two others were killed.

On June 18, 2024, during the celebration of the city's 17th anniversary, mayor Roderick Furigay highlighted and declared the city free from the militant group Abu Sayyaf in his State of the City Report (SOCR). However, several hours after the declaration, a bomb explosion occurred at a gas station located in Barangay Matibay.

== Geography ==
The terrain is relatively plain along the coastal areas and hilly in some areas. The urban area is 2.5 meters (8 ft 2 in) above sea level and gently sloping to 300 meters (980 ft) toward the hinterlands.

=== Barangays ===
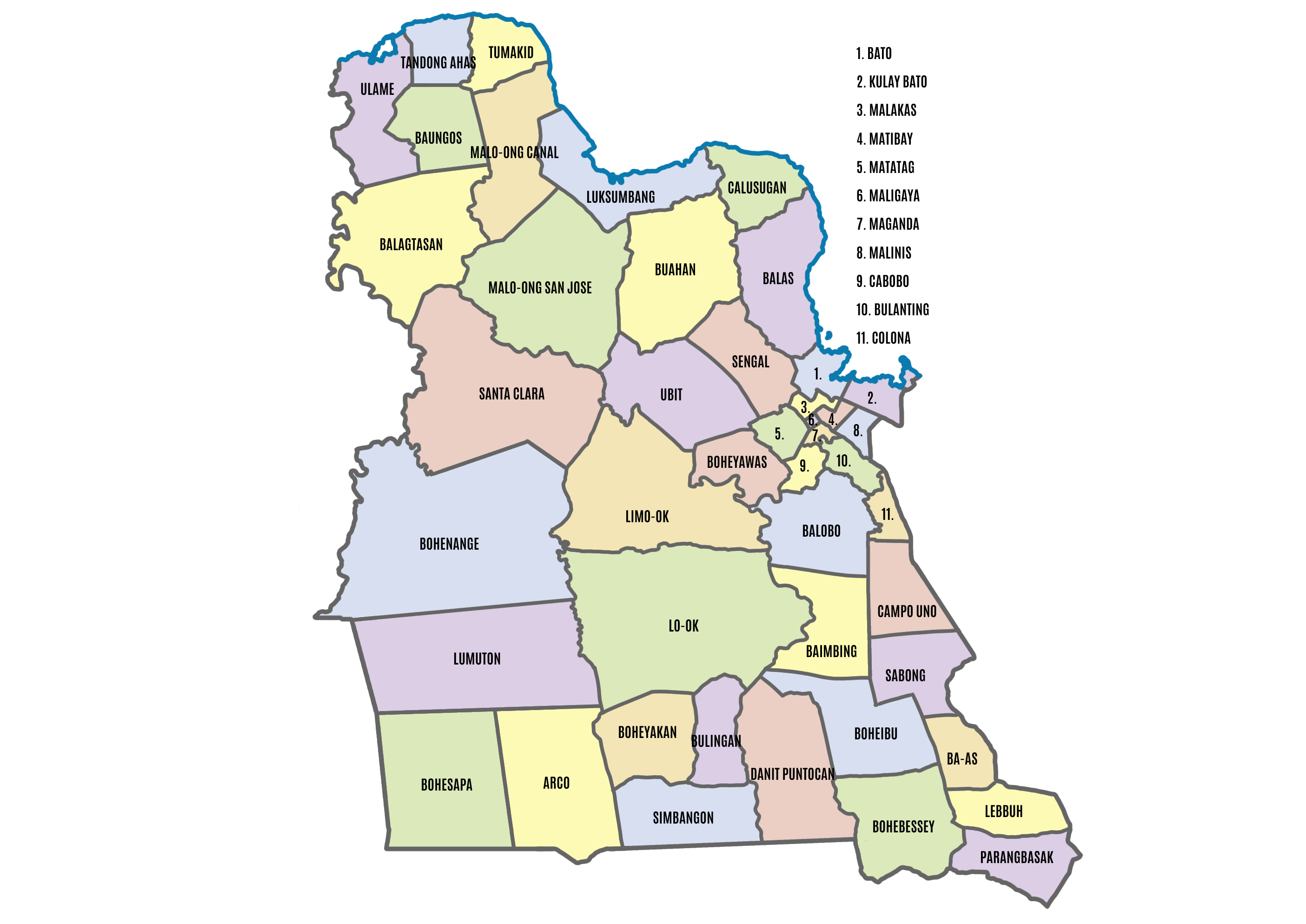
Political map of Lamitan City, Basilan

Lamitan is politically subdivided into 45 barangays. Each barangay consists of puroks while some have sitios.

- Arco
- Ba-as
- Baimbing
- Balagtasan
- Balas
- Balobo
- Bato
- Baungos
- Bohebessey
- Boheibu
- Bohenange
- Bohesapa
- Boheyakan
- Boheyawas
- Buahan
- Bulanting
- Bulingan
- Cabobo
- Calugusan
- Campo Uno
- Colonia
- Danit-Puntocan
- Kulay Bato
- Lebbuh
- Limo-ok
- Lo-ok
- Luksumbang
- Lumuton
- Maganda (Poblacion)
- Malakas (Poblacion)
- Maligaya (Poblacion)
- Malinis (Poblacion)
- Malo-ong Canal
- Malo-ong San Jose
- Matatag (Poblacion)
- Matibay (Poblacion)
- Parangbasak
- Sabong
- Santa Clara
- Sengal
- Simbangon
- Tandong Ahas
- Tumakid
- Ubit
- Ulame

=== Climate ===
Climate data for Lamitan, Basilan
Month	Jan	Feb	Mar	Apr	May	Jun	Jul	Aug	Sep	Oct	Nov	Dec	Year
Mean daily maximum °C (°F)	27 (81)	27 (81)	27 (81)	28 (82)	28 (82)	28 (82)	28 (82)	28 (82)	28 (82)	28 (82)	28 (82)	28 (82)	28 (82)
Mean daily minimum °C (°F)	27 (81)	26 (79)	27 (81)	27 (81)	28 (82)	28 (82)	27 (81)	27 (81)	27 (81)	27 (81)	27 (81)	27 (81)	27 (81)
Average precipitation mm (inches)	106 (4.2)	77 (3.0)	91 (3.6)	104 (4.1)	236 (9.3)	321 (12.6)	325 (12.8)	306 (12.0)	227 (8.9)	271 (10.7)	204 (8.0)	115 (4.5)	2,383 (93.7)
Average rainy days	15.3	13.8	17.7	15.5	23.1	24.5	24.3	24.6	21.1	22.9	20.1	16.6	239.5
Source: Meteoblue (modeled/calculated data, not measured locally)

The climatic condition is the same with other areas in the entire Basilan Island. It has a "D" type of climate and rainfall is evenly distributed throughout the year.

== Demographics ==
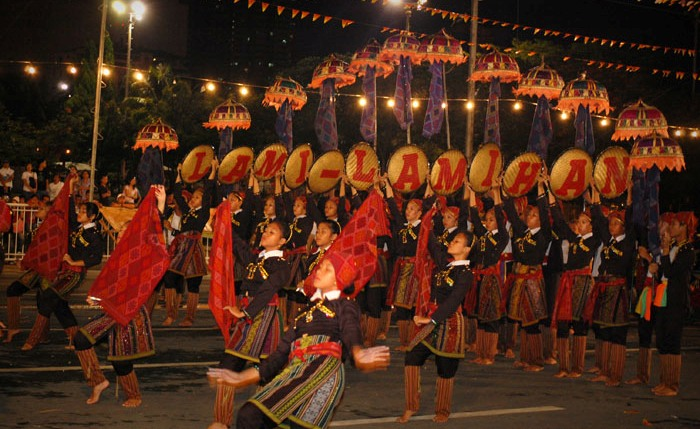
Lami-Lamihan Festival

Population census of Lamitan

Year	Pop.	±% p.a.
1960	35,160	—
1970	37,423	+0.62%
1975	39,703	+1.19%
1980	45,223	+2.64%
1990	47,859	+0.57%
1995	54,433	+2.44%

Year	Pop.	±% p.a.
2000	58,709	+1.63%
2007	82,074	+4.73%
2010	68,996	−6.12%
2015	74,782	+1.55%
2020	100,150	+6.34%
2024	116,652	+3.73%

Source: Philippine Statistics Authority

== Economy ==
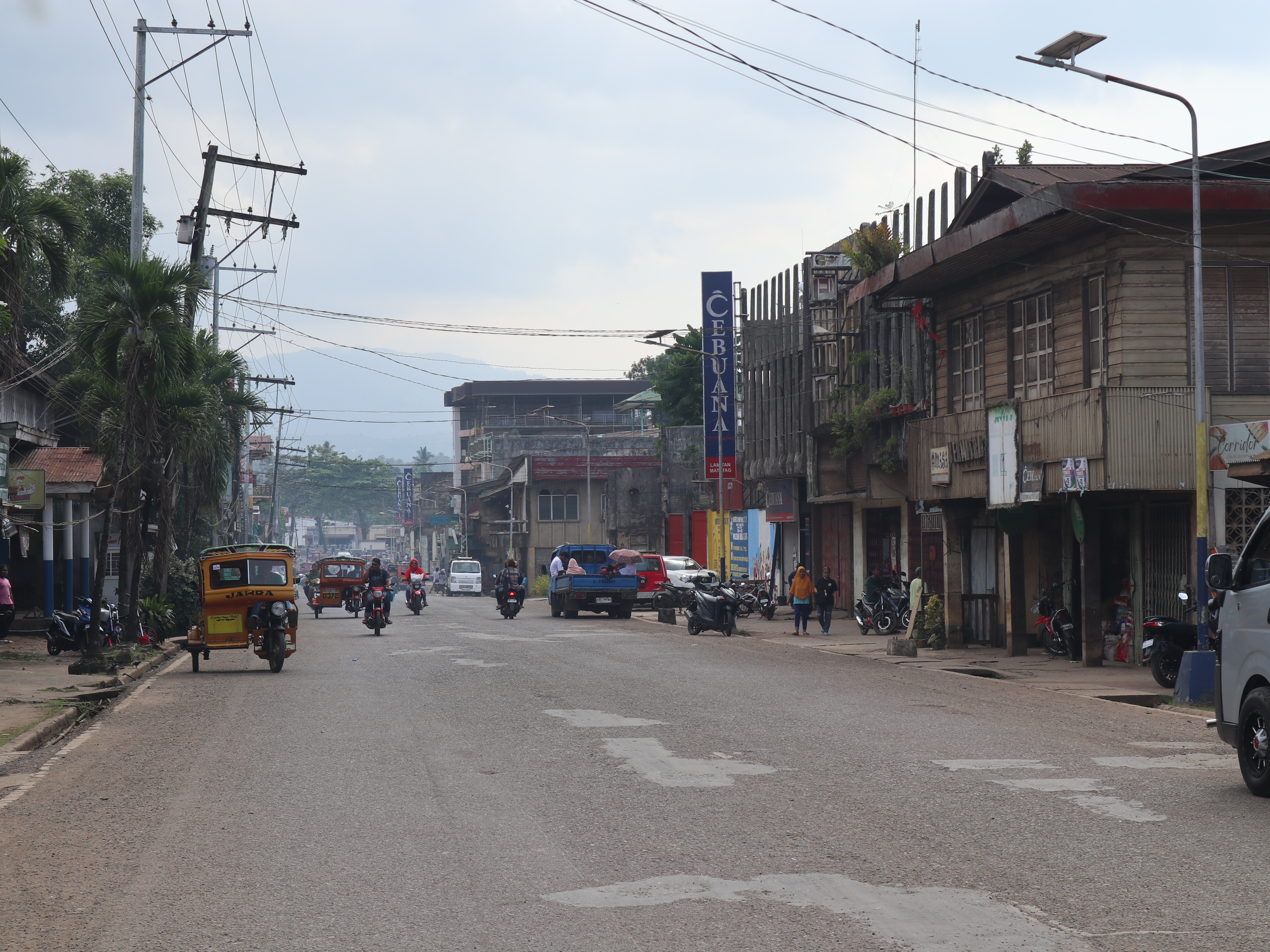
Lamitan poblacion

Poverty Incidence of Lamitan

Source: Philippine Statistics Authority

== Historical sites ==
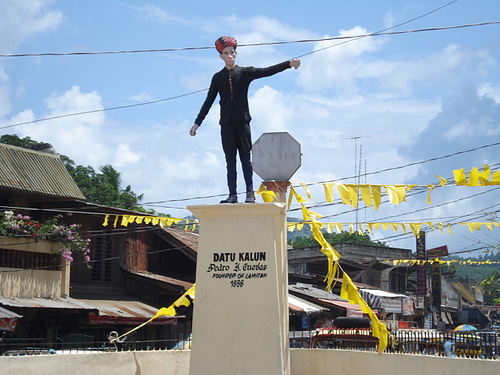
Datu Kalun Shrine

- Datu Kalun Shrine – Built as a tribute to a famous Yakan leader and founder of Lamitan. His descendants are the Antonio-Cuevas-Pamaran-Flores clan.
- Museum of Lamitan – Showcases the color and highlights of the Lami-lamihan festival. It also serves as the information center for the development of this town.

== Education ==
=== Tertiary ===
Lamitan is home to one state university and three private colleges. The city has an extension campus of the Basilan State University, which is based in Isabela City. The three HEIs are the Mindanao Autonomous College, the Mariam School of Nursing and Furigay Colleges, Inc. (FCI).

The Mariam School of Nursing was established in 2004 as part of its Chairwoman's educational outreach program and was named Mariam or Mother Mary - a unifying and guiding figure among the Christians and Muslims. Also offers 11 Tesda Qualifications for National Certificates.

=== Secondary ===
Lamitan has seven Secondary Schools: one Private Secondary School; The Claret School of Lamitan, one Laboratory School of Basilan State University and five National High Schools i.e. Lamitan National High School, Look National High School, Colony National High School, Ubit National High School and Parangbasak National High School.

=== Elementary ===
There are five districts that composed of thirty nine elementary schools namely; Lamitan East District, South District, Central District, West I District and West II District. There are four private elementary schools.
