= DXPW =

WBA FM (DXPW)
- Maluso; Philippines
- Broadcast area: Basilan
- Frequency: 99.1 MHz
- Branding: WBA 99.1

Programming
- Languages: Yakan, Chavacano, Filipino
- Format: Community radio
- Affiliations: Presidential Broadcast Service

Ownership
- Owner: Western Basilan Alliance

History
- First air date: October 14, 2019

Technical information
- Licensing authority: NTC
- Power: 2,000 watts

DXPW (99.1 FM), broadcasting as WBA 99.1, is a radio station owned and operated by the Western Basilan Alliance. Its studios and transmitter are located at the Municipal Government Center, Brgy. Taberlongan, Maluso.
