= Battle of Tipo-Tipo =

2016 Philippine battle

- Part of the Moro conflict
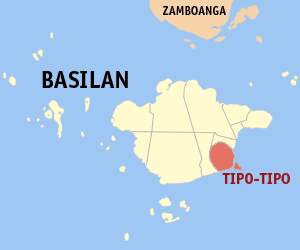
- A map of Tipo-Tipo, Basilan
Date	9–14 April 2016 (5 days)
Location	Tipo-Tipo, Basilan, Southern Philippines
Result	Abu Sayyaf victory

Belligerents
Philippines	Abu Sayyaf

Commanders and leaders
(Philippines) Benigno Aquino III (Philippines) Hernando Iriberri (Philippines) Elmer Suderio (Philippines) Lt. Remigio Licena †	Isnilon Hapilon; Ubaida Hapilon †; Radzmil Jannatul †

Units involved
Armed Forces of the Philippines: Philippine Army; 44th Infantry Battalion; 4th Special Forces Battalion; 3rd Scout Ranger Battalion	Unknown

Strength
~100 soldiers	100 militants

Casualties and losses
18 killed 56 wounded 100 killed (ISIS claim; dismissed by the government)	30 killed 3 casualties (ISIS claim)

The Battle of Tipo-Tipo was a military engagement that began on 9 April 2016 at Tipo-Tipo, Basilan Island, Philippines between forces of the Philippine Army and members of the Abu Sayyaf militant group. The battle resulted in dozens of casualties, with at least 18 soldiers and 31 militants reported killed, and more than 70 others injured. It was the largest single loss of life for the Philippine Army since the beginning of the year, and came just a day after the group had released an Italian hostage.

== Background ==
Abu Sayyaf became a part of ISIS in 2014 when nearly all of its members, including its leader Isnilon Hapilon, pledged allegiance to the said group. The Philippine government dismissed this news as a threat.

The Philippine military pledged that on 9 April 2016, which that day is also the National Day of Valor, they will conduct an offensive aimed at wiping out the militant groups in the island.

== Battle ==
Clashes erupted around 8am on 9 April as troops entered Tipo-Tipo in search of Abu Sayyaf insurgents. A group of more than 100 militants ambushed the government forces, sparking a 10-hour firefight, according to Major Filemon Tan, a spokesman for the Western Mindanao Command of the Philippine Army. News reports indicated an entire platoon was wiped out, with at least four soldiers being beheaded by militants. Among those killed were Ubaida Hapilon, son of the regional commander Isnilon Hapilon, as well as Mohammad Khattab, a Moroccan bomb maker and extremist preacher.

On 13 April, ongoing operations conducted resulted in the death toll of 24 Abu Sayaf members. President Aquino visited injured soldiers in Zamboanga. Fighting lasted until 14 April.

== Aftermath ==
On 8 July, CNN report that "the fighting in Basilan that began Wednesday night is affecting three towns: Tipo-Tipo, Ungkaya Pukan and Al-Barka" and that "the armed men fighting authorities in Basilan are led by the notorious Abu Sayyaf leaders Puruji Indama and Isnilon Hapilon" The Islamic State released a report on the fighting, claiming 40 ISIS militants had been killed in eight days of clashes and that the battle involved heavy artillery fire and airstrikes.

=== ISIS involvement ===
The Islamic State of Iraq and the Levant claimed responsibility for the clash on 9 April. In a statement by the group's Amaq news agency dated on April 13, it said that the militants involved in the clash on 9 April had bombed 7 trucks of the Philippine military, killing 100 soldiers with only three casualties in the militants' side. The Philippine security officials dismissed the claim as propaganda saying that there were "many gaps and inconsistencies" in ISIS' statement. Brigadier General Restituto Padilla, military spokesperson said in an April 14 report by Reuters that only 18 soldiers and 28 Abu Sayaff fighters have died at that time and no truck exploded. Padilla also said that the military hasn't established that Abu Sayyaf and ISIS are linked organizations.
