= Tuburan =

Tuburan is the name of two municipalities in the Philippines:

- Tuburan, Cebu
- Tuburan, Basilan
