= Ingatun-Lukman Gumuntul Istarul =

Filipino politician

Ingatun-Lukman "Tong" Gumuntul Istarul (LKS-KAM) is a Filipino politician and current mayor of Tipo-Tipo in Basilan (2010–13).
