= Basilan's 2nd parliamentary district =

Parliamentary district of the Bangsamoro Parliament

- Ikalawang distrito ng parlamento ng Basilan
- Parliamentary district for the Bangsamoro Parliament
- Municipalities: Akbar; Al-Barka; Hadji Mohammad Ajul; Tipo-Tipo; Tuburan
- Province: Basilan
- Population: 153,796 (2024)
- Electorate: 64,643 (2026)

Current Parliamentary district
- Seats: 1
- Party: United Bangsamoro Justice Party
- Member of Parliament-elect: Paisal Sali

Basilan's 2nd parliamentary district is the second out of the four parliamentary districts of the province of Basilan for the Bangsamoro Parliament. It is composed of the municipalities of Tuburan, Hadji Mohammad Ajul, Akbar, Al-Barka, and Tipo-Tipo.

Paisal Sali of the United Bangsamoro Justice Party is the member of parliament-elect for this district after the inaugural 2026 Bangsamoro Parliament election. He will assume his office on October 30, 2026.

== Boundaries ==
=== 2024–2025 ===
The parliamentary districts of Bangsamoro was after the passage of Bangsamoro Act No. 58 into law. The bill was approved on February 28, 2024, by the Bangsamoro Parliament and was signed by Chief Minister Murad Ebrahim.

The initial boundaries of the Basilan's 2nd parliamentary district is as follows:

- Al-Barka
- Hadji Mohammad Ajul
- Tipo-Tipo
- Tuburan

The constituency was not filled during this period as the first regular Bangsamoro Parliament election has been postponed.

=== Current (2025–present) ===
After the Supreme Court excluded Sulu from the Bangsamoro region in September 2024, the Bangsamoro Parliament was prompted to redistribute the seats allocated to Sulu. The configuration was promulgated via Bangsamoro Autonomy Act No. 77, signed by Chief Minister Abdulraof Macacua on August 28, 2025, reconfigured the Basilan second district. The town of Akbar was added to the Basilan second district.

Both Acts No. 58 and 77 were declared unconstitutional by the Supreme Court which also ordered the parliament to make a new law anew. Macacua signed a new bill into law on January 20, 2026, becoming Bangsamoro Autonomy Act No. 86.

As per Bangsamoro Autonomy Act No. 86, the local government units under Basilan's 2nd district are as follows:

- Akbar
- Al-Barka
- Hadji Mohammad Ajul
- Tipo-Tipo
- Tuburan

== Elections ==
=== 2026 ===
Parliamentary election 2026: Basilan - 2nd parliamentary district
Party	Candidate	Votes	%	±%
UBJP	Pai Sali	27,954	48.17	N/A
BPP	Abdulsamie Kallahal	25,035	43.14	N/A
BFP	Abbas Salung	4,961	8.55	N/A
Independent	Abath Kinjing	37	0.06	N/A
BaPa	Khalid Hassan	30	0.05	N/A
Independent	Altun Angeles	15	0.03	N/A
Total votes		58,032	100.00	N/A
UBJP win (new seat)				
Registered electors		64,643	COMELEC	N/A
