= Battle of Basilan (2014) =

2014 Philippine military offensive

- Part of the Moro conflict
- view of Basilan (red) within larger Philippines
Date	April 11–30, 2014
Location	Basilan, Southern Philippines
Result	Philippine victory: Operation deemed a success in driving Jihadist presence from Basilan; Mission objective failed in capturing Abu Sayyaf commanders

Belligerents
Philippines: Armed Forces of the Philippines; Moro National Liberation Front	Abu Sayyaf; Rogue MNLF fighters Jemaah Islamiyah

Commanders and leaders
(Philippines) Pres. Benigno Aquino III (Philippines) Gen. Emmanuel T. Bautista (Philippines) Brig. Gen. Carlito Galvez Jr. (Philippines) Capt. Richard Encisco (Philippines) Lt. Gen. Rustico Geurrero (Philippines) Lt. Col. John Paolo Perez; Ghazali Jaafar; Hamza Sapaton	Puriji Indama; Nurhassan Jamiri; Isnilon Totoni Hapilon

Units involved
Armed Forces of the Philippines - Western Mindanao Command: 1st Infantry Division; Army 101st Brigade; 104th Army Brigade; 18th Infantry Battalion; 1st Scout Ranger Regiment; MNLF Division/Ad Hoc Joint Action Group (AHJAG): 114th Brigade; Continued military operations (2nd phase): Philippine Marine Corps	Abu Sayyaf; Rogue MNLF fighters Jemaah Islamiyah

Strength
~1,000: Approx. 200 men of the Scout Ranger Regiment; Approx. 150 of the 114th Brigade	~200: Approx. 180 Abu Sayyaf militants; Approx. 20 rogue MNLF fighters; 4 Jemaah Islamiyah operatives (3 Malaysians and 1 Arab)

Casualties and losses
(Philippines) 2 killed (Philippines) 31 wounded 4 members killed 2nd phase of operations (Philippines) 1 marine killed (Philippines) 14 wounded	Casualties: 18 killed 14 wounded 2nd phase of operations 14 militants killed
- Note: MNLF engaged both army and Sayyaf militia Operations have continued in neighboring islands with the same mission objective

Battle of Basilan was a military offensive launched by the Philippine military to apprehend two lead commanders in the Abu Sayyaf Islamic militia wanted for corruption, money laundering, and terrorism related charges. The main cause of the operation was Sayyaf leader Indama and his followers threatening and attempting to extort money from a circumferential road network. The two-day offensive ended with both suspects evading capture and the island of Basilan falling under government authority. Both the army and MNLF collaborated in fighting alongside for a duration of the operation the first such instance since a truce. However collaborators within the Sayyaf militia included members of the MNLF who sympathized with their cause or had public relations with some of the militants.

The army renewed its offensive in detaining wanted leaders after the first of operations failed its main objective. So far clashes have been reported in neighboring islands such as Sulu involving militant elements who took refuge from the Basilan operation. Indama and prominent Sayyaf leaders are believed to be among those residing in the area who evaded certain capture by the army.

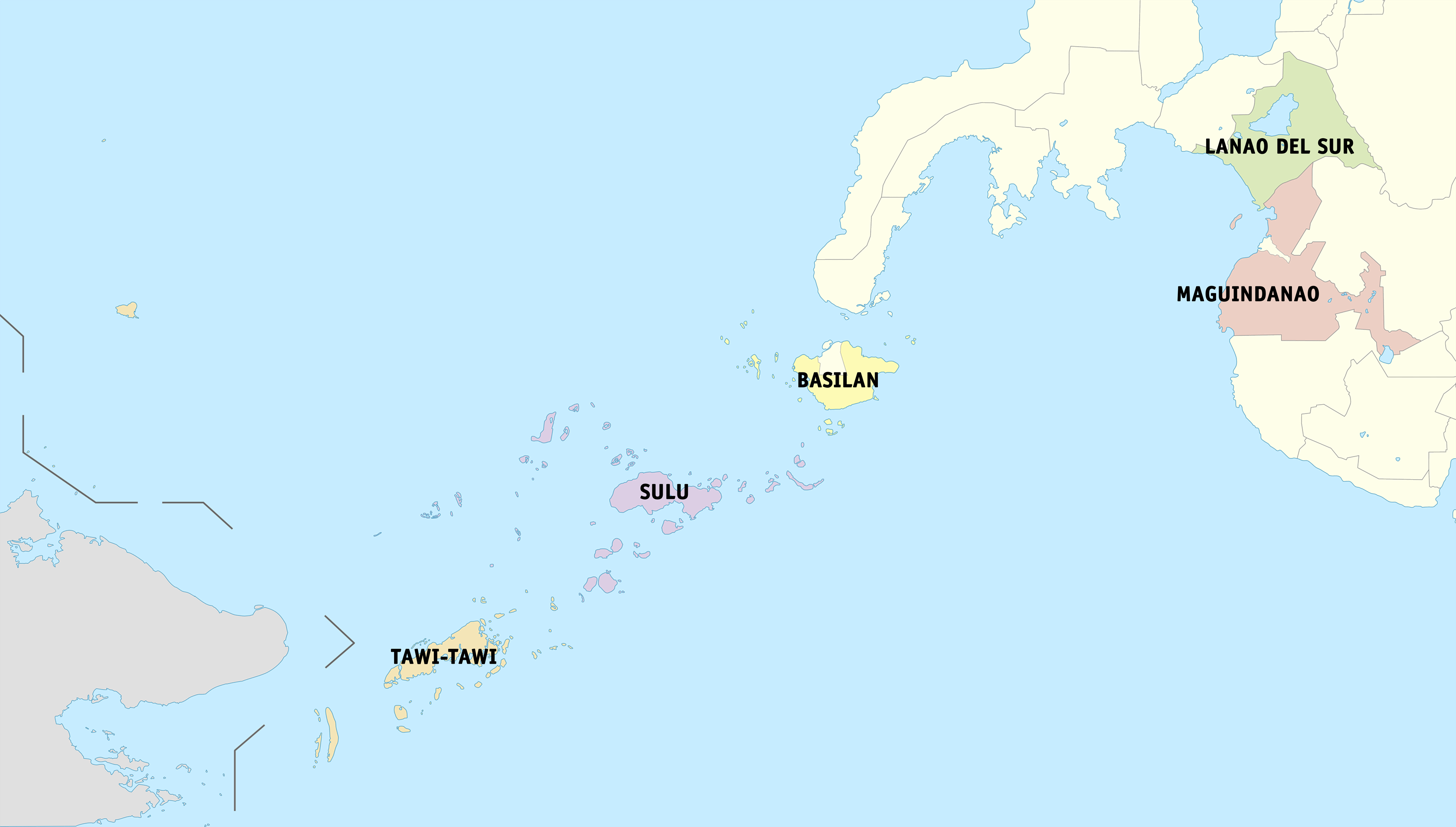
Better view of Basilan within Western Mindanao

== Operation in Basilan ==
On April 11, 2014, the Filipino military, under the command of Brig. Gen. Carlito Galvez, launched an amphibious operation to track down two prominent head leaders of the Al-Queda affiliated group, Abu Sayyaf, on the island of Basilan after information circulated that wanted leader Puriji Indama was present in the area. Basilan remained a lawless region controlled by rebel groups such as the MNLF who occasionally clashed with Sayyaf militants. Since the ceasefire agreement between the two, the army has openly worked with MNLF command in tracking down militants and in this case participating in the operation under the same jurisdiction. The joint action banner known as Ad Hoc Joint Action Group (AHJAG) was systemed to combat terrorists elements in Mindanao in times of crisis.

The Western Mindanao Command was deployed in an apparent operation to take custody of the suspects on terrorism related charges for beheadings and money fraud. The operation involved the elite combat terrorism unit (Scout Rangers) and several brigades under the Mindanao Command led by Lt. Gen. Rustico Guerrero. Early gun battles were reported in the Tipo-Tipo town around 2:25 and continued for a short period after soldiers of the 104th Brigade clashed with a group of 30 Abu Sayyaf militants later reinforced by another 30 more. No fatalities were reported besides several injuries. The army was long in countering the attack since accidental exposure to MNLF communities that occupied the district could lead to clashes on autonomy rights that forbid Filipino military presence in MNLF territory. Army coordination with MNLF command in linking up with their troops (since the MNLF was fighting Sayyaf militia) was mixed. The majority of MNLF members retained their refusal to work with Filipino authorities supposedly having family connections with some of the militants. The 104th Brigade called in a dispatch to secure the contested area.

Around 200 Scout Rangers from the 18th Infantry battalion were deployed in fighting militants who were now aided by MNLF volunteers fighting independently under Sayyaf command. The fighting proximity to the MNLF held areas caused an onslaught in crossfire from both sides. The Ranger unit suffered 2 dead, and 28 wounded by grenade blasts, before being overwhelmed by two fronts consisting of 150 militants. The timely arrival of additional reinforcements of the Mindanao Command saved the unit from possible disaster. The MNLF suffered 3 dead in this clash either killed by militants or rangers. The army claimed the upper hand killing 5 militants.

Militants reportedly regrouped at a school in Sitio Kurelem district at 9:00, 60 in number after being beaten back by the offensive. The army coordinated with MNLF 114th Base commander Hamza Sapaton of (AHJAG) who helped in logistical operations in tracking down leads on enemy movements. The 1st Infantry Division a counter-guerrilla unit helped in search operations killing 7 militants including an MNLF collaborator but failing to get any information on Abu Sayyaf commanders. By early morning, the army declared a formal end to the operation and full control of restive areas of Basilan island. All previously contested areas were secured by the army. According to military accounts, Indama fled the island with his right-hand man Isnilon Hapilon who was also wanted by authorities after the Filipino counter-attack.

== Aftermath and continued operations ==
Army casualties were summed at 2 dead and 31 wounded. Army Chief of Staff Gen. Emmanuel Bautista awarded Gold Cross Medals to wounded soldiers Lt. Col. Fernando Reyeg, the commanding officer of the 3rd Scout Ranger Battalion, and enlisted personnel Cpl. Loui Orinia. A 3.3 million peso (US$74,500 at the time) bounty was put on Indama's head by the military after the operation failed to apprehend him.

Abu Sayyaf casualties were declared 17 dead including 4 MNLF members independently fighting according to its spokesperson, and 16 wounded. Though no bodies have been recovered the army stated operations would continue to find their graves.

On April 29, 2014, army forces secured the island of Sulu where intelligence reports indicated wanted Sayyaf leader Indama and his followers took refuge from operations in Basilan. Both sides exchanged mortar rounds in Patikul avoiding direct fighting. The shelling operations involved a Philippine Marine Corps detachment sent to secure an abandoned Sayyaf storage and base facility. When they arrived, they were ambushed by 200 militants firing rounds. The shelling continued until the next morning leaving a marine and 14 militants dead.
