= Akbar, Basilan =

Municipality in Basilan, Philippines

Akbar اكبر
- Municipality
- Municipality of Akbar
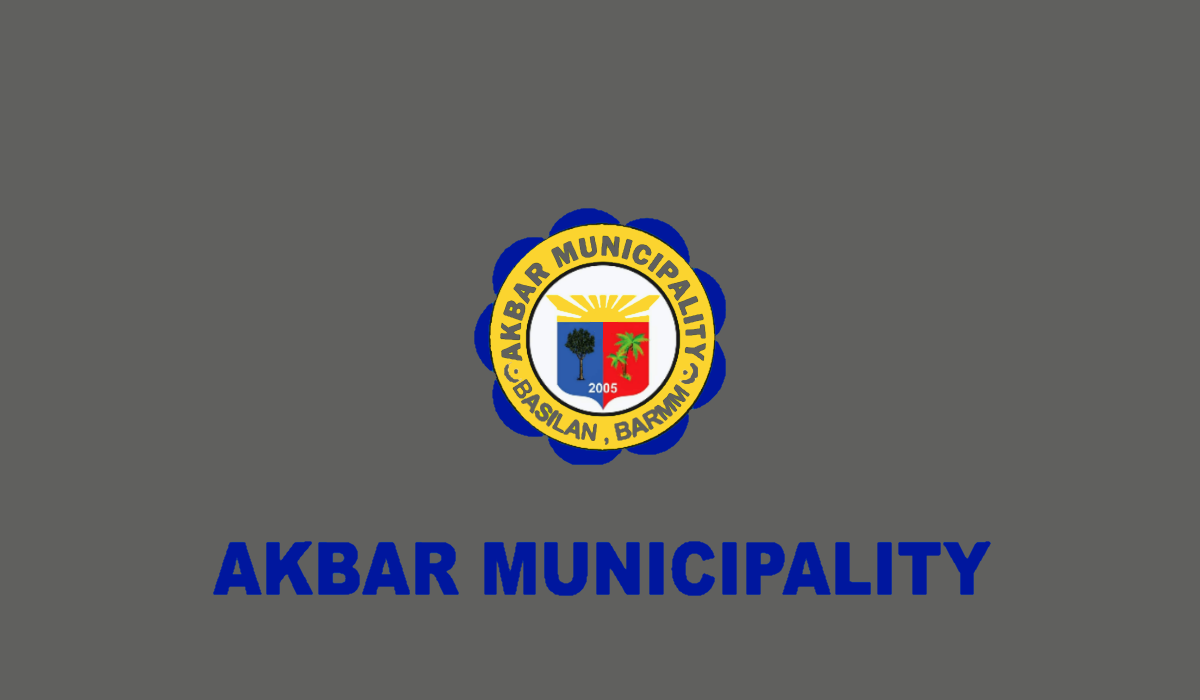
- Flag Seal

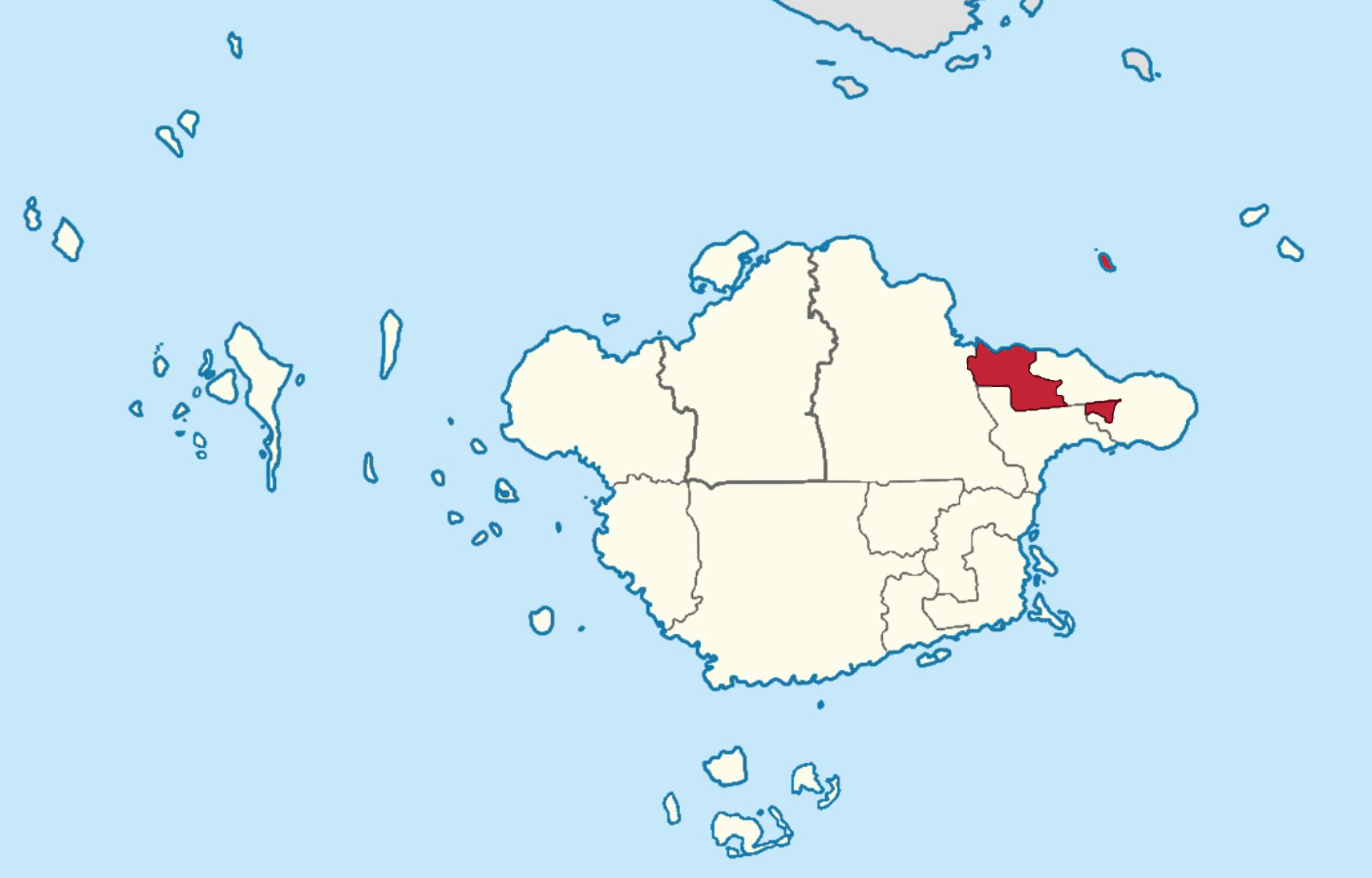
- Map of Basilan with Akbar highlighted
- Interactive map of Akbar
- Location in the Philippines
- Coordinates: 6°39′54″N 122°11′43″E
- Country: Philippines
- Region: Bangsamoro Autonomous Region in Muslim Mindanao
- Province: Basilan
- House district: Lone district
- Parliamentary district: 2nd district
- Founded: December 20, 2005
- Barangays: 9 (see Barangays)

Government
  - Type: Sangguniang Bayan
  - Mayor: Alih A. Sali
  - Vice Mayor: Raiza A. Sali
  - House Representative: Yusop T. Alano
  - Municipal Council: Members: Haber A. Sali; Ubaidie A. Muslimin; Harid U. Birong; Abdulhalik S. Yusop; Vherkis A. Amin; Ali G. Halil; Mujaheed A. Salih; Kadapi M. Mombo
  - Electorate: 7,516 voters (2025)

Area
  - Total: 38.76 km^{2} (14.97 sq mi)
- Elevation: 55 m (180 ft)
- Highest elevation: 999 m (3,278 ft)
- Lowest elevation: 0 m (0 ft)

Population (2024 census)
  - Total: 27,911
  - Density: 720.1/km^{2} (1,865/sq mi)
  - Households: 3,621

Economy
  - Income class: 4th municipal income class
  - Poverty incidence: 50.41% (2023)
  - Revenue: ₱ 115.6 million (2024)
  - Assets: ₱ 310.1 million (2024)
  - Expenditure: ₱ 52.02 million (2024)
  - Liabilities: ₱ 178.5 million (2024)

Service provider
  - Electricity: Basilan Electric Cooperative (BASELCO)
- Time zone: UTC+8 (PST)
- ZIP code: 7306
- PSGC: 1900708000
- IDD : area code: +63 (0)62
- Native languages: Yakan; Chavacano; Tagalog

Akbar, officially the Municipality of Akbar (Tausūg: Lupah Akbar; Chavacano: Municipalidad de Akbar; Tagalog: Bayan ng Akbar), is a municipality in the province of Basilan, Philippines. According to the 2024 census, it has a population of 27,911 people, making it the least populated municipality in the province.

== History ==
Akbar was established pursuant to Muslim Mindanao Autonomy Act No. 193, enacted on December 20, 2005.

It is composed of 9 barangays that were formerly part of Tuburan, including one island barangay. It has an area of 38.76 square kilometres (14.97 sq mi).

The place is named after Imam Akbar Marani, a known Islamic preacher/propagator and descendant of Kuddarat, who landed in Taguime (now part of the municipality of Moh’d Ajul) in 17th century and later migrated to central Mindanao. In his later years, Imam Akbar relocated from Sinangkapan, Akbar, to Lantawan based in Kanibungan and he was buried there.

== Geography ==
=== Barangays ===
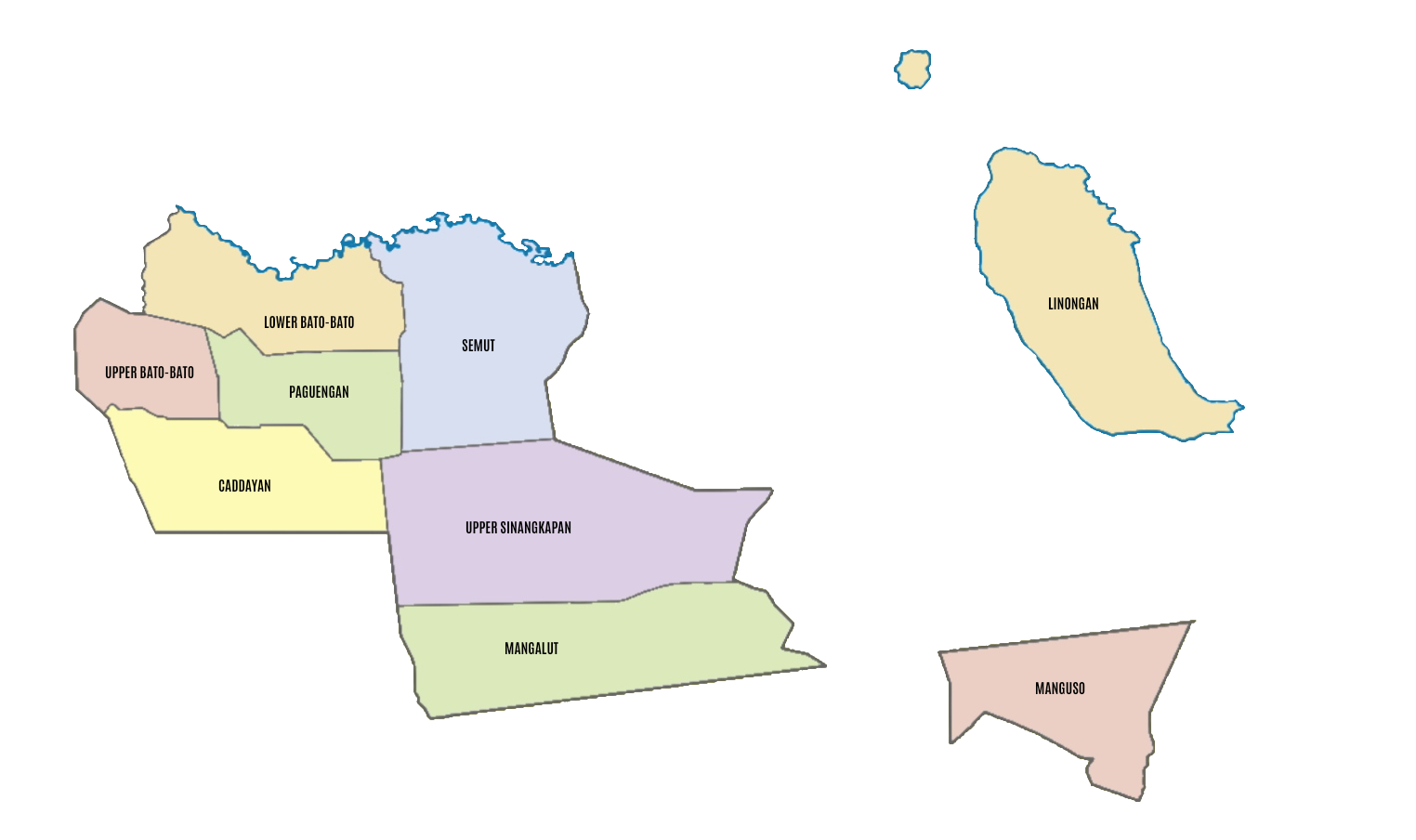
Political map of Akbar, Basilan

Akbar is politically subdivided into 9 barangays. Each barangay consists of puroks while some have sitios.

PSGC	Barangay	Population			±% p.a.	
		2024		2010		
150708001	Caddayan	3.9%	1,090	569	▴	4.62%
150708002	Linongan	8.8%	2,454	1,938	▴	1.65%
150708003	Lower Bato-bato	6.5%	1,823	1,885	▾	−0.23%
150708004	Mangalut	5.7%	1,603	1,152	▴	2.32%
150708005	Manguso	4.3%	1,201	1,051	▴	0.93%
150708006	Paguengan	5.9%	1,649	1,280	▴	1.77%
150708007	Semut	16.1%	4,483	3,168	▴	2.44%
150708008	Upper Bato-bato	3.9%	1,093	642	▴	3.76%
150708009	Upper Sinangkapan	7.6%	2,135	1,684	▴	1.66%
	Total		27,911	13,369	▴	5.25%

=== Climate ===
Climate data for Akbar, Basilan
Month	Jan	Feb	Mar	Apr	May	Jun	Jul	Aug	Sep	Oct	Nov	Dec	Year
Mean daily maximum °C (°F)	27 (81)	27 (81)	27 (81)	28 (82)	28 (82)	28 (82)	28 (82)	28 (82)	28 (82)	28 (82)	28 (82)	28 (82)	28 (82)
Mean daily minimum °C (°F)	27 (81)	26 (79)	27 (81)	27 (81)	28 (82)	28 (82)	27 (81)	27 (81)	27 (81)	28 (82)	27 (81)	27 (81)	27 (81)
Average precipitation mm (inches)	106 (4.2)	77 (3.0)	91 (3.6)	104 (4.1)	236 (9.3)	321 (12.6)	325 (12.8)	306 (12.0)	227 (8.9)	271 (10.7)	204 (8.0)	115 (4.5)	2,383 (93.7)
Average rainy days	15.3	13.8	17.7	15.5	23.1	24.5	24.3	24.6	21.1	22.9	20.1	16.6	239.5
Source: Meteoblue (modeled/calculated data, not measured locally)

== Demographics ==
Population census of Akbar
Year	Pop.	±% p.a.
2007	21,312	—
2010	13,369	−15.61%
2015	17,531	+5.30%
2020	23,098	+5.98%
2024	27,911	+4.65%
Source: Philippine Statistics Authority

In the 2024 census, Akbar had a population of 27,911. The population density was 720 inhabitants per square kilometre (1,900/sq mi).

== Economy ==
Poverty Incidence of Akbar

Source: Philippine Statistics Authority
