= Hadji Muhtamad =

Municipality in Basilan, Philippines

Hadji Muhtamad حدجي موهتامد
- Municipality
- Municipality of Hadji Muhtamad
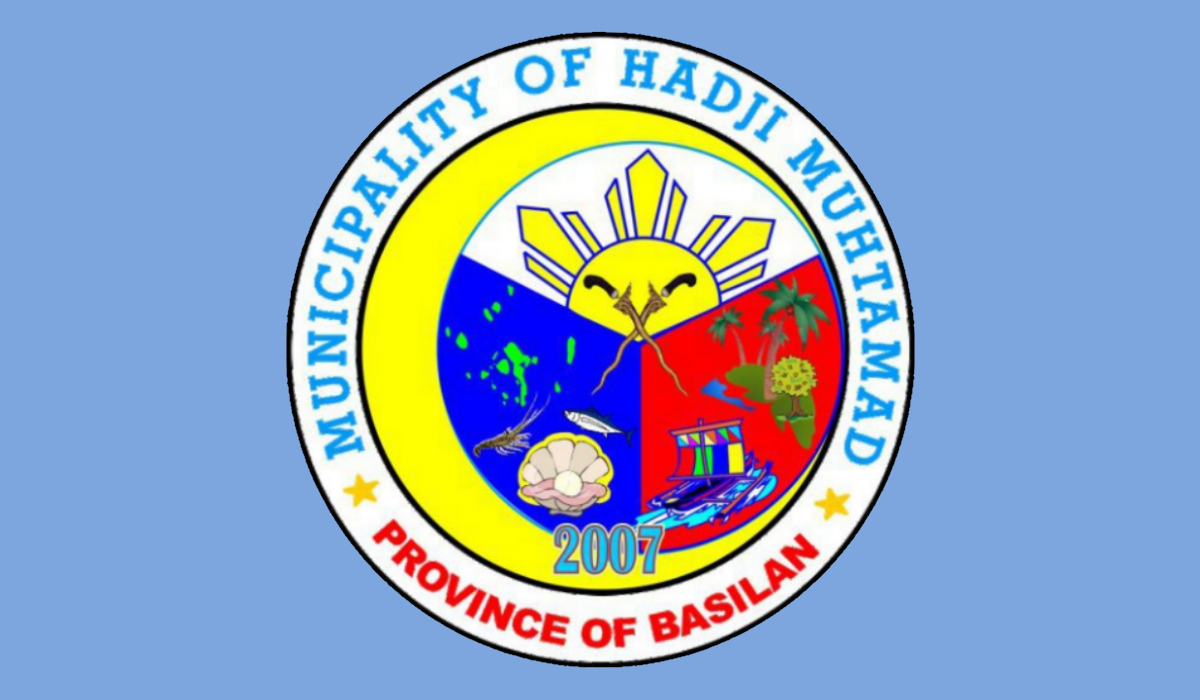
- Flag Seal

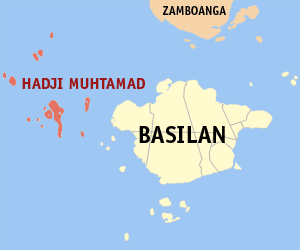
- Map of Basilan with Hadji Muhtamad highlighted
- Interactive map of Hadji Muhtamad
- Location within the Philippines
- Coordinates: 6°39′43″N 121°35′10″E
- Country: Philippines
- Region: Bangsamoro Autonomous Region in Muslim Mindanao
- Province: Basilan
- House district: Lone district
- Parliamentary district: 4th district
- Founded: August 25, 2007
- Barangays: 10 (see Barangays

Government
  - Type: Sangguniang Bayan
  - Mayor: Arsina K. Nanoh
  - Vice Mayor: Nurissa L. Kahing
  - House Representative: Yusop T. Alano
  - Municipal Council: Members: Anwar M. Abdulmajid; Nurhaida A. Jamaldin; Mufti A. Mohammad; Basir T. Aldam; Israja S. Jailani; Mahamud M. Saraman; Nasser S. Dallong; Gajer U. Abubakar
  - Electorate: 11,877 voters (2025)

Area
  - Total: 173.22 km^{2} (66.88 sq mi)
- Elevation: 1.0 m (3.3 ft)
- Highest elevation: 230 m (750 ft)
- Lowest elevation: 0 m (0 ft)

Population (2024 census)
  - Total: 30,122
  - Density: 173.89/km^{2} (450.38/sq mi)
  - Households: 4,261

Economy
  - Income class: 5th municipal income class
  - Poverty incidence: 53.34% (2023)
  - Revenue: ₱ 126.5 million (2024)
  - Assets: ₱ 280.3 million (2024)
  - Expenditure: ₱ 72.37 million (2024)
  - Liabilities: ₱ 205.2 million (2024)

Service provider
  - Electricity: Basilan Electric Cooperative (BASELCO)
- Time zone: UTC+8 (PST)
- ZIP code: 7301
- PSGC: 1900712000
- IDD : area code: +63 (0)62
- Native languages: Yakan; Chavacano; Tagalog

Hadji Muhtamad, officially the Municipality of Hadji Muhtamad (Tausūg: Lupah Hadji Muhtamad; Chavacano: Municipalidad de Hadji Muhtamad; Tagalog: Bayan ng Hadji Muhtamad), is a municipality in the province of Basilan, Philippines. According to the 2024 census, it has a population of 30,122 people.

Hadji Muhtamad was created out of the 10 barangays of Lantawan that were not on Basilan Island, through Muslim Mindanao Autonomy Act No. 200, which was subsequently ratified in a plebiscite held on August 25, 2007.

== Geography ==
Its territory includes the Pilas Islands and surrounding islets, west of Basilan Island.

=== Barangays ===
Hadji Muhtamad is politically subdivided into 10 barangays. Each barangay consists of puroks while some have sitios.

PSGC	Barangay	Population			±% p.a.	
		2024		2010		
150712001	Baluk-baluk	5.3%	1,585	1,063	▴	2.81%
150712002	Dasalan	9.9%	2,970	1,518	▴	4.77%
150712003	Lubukan	10.8%	3,260	1,730	▴	4.50%
150712004	Luukbongsod	6.4%	1,928	988	▴	4.75%
150712005	Mananggal	2.7%	800	763	▴	0.33%
150712006	Palahangan	6.4%	1,920	787	▴	6.39%
150712007	Panducan	5.5%	1,652	1,087	▴	2.95%
150712008	Sangbay Big	11.8%	3,549	1,330	▴	7.05%
150712009	Sangbay Small	9.6%	2,900	1,416	▴	5.11%
150712010	Tausan	15.0%	4,521	1,567	▴	7.64%
	Total		30,122	12,249	▴	6.45%

=== Climate ===
Climate data for Hadji Muhtamad, Basilan
Month	Jan	Feb	Mar	Apr	May	Jun	Jul	Aug	Sep	Oct	Nov	Dec	Year
Mean daily maximum °C (°F)	27 (81)	27 (81)	27 (81)	28 (82)	28 (82)	28 (82)	28 (82)	28 (82)	28 (82)	28 (82)	28 (82)	28 (82)	28 (82)
Mean daily minimum °C (°F)	27 (81)	26 (79)	27 (81)	27 (81)	28 (82)	28 (82)	28 (82)	28 (82)	28 (82)	28 (82)	28 (82)	27 (81)	28 (81)
Average precipitation mm (inches)	129 (5.1)	91 (3.6)	102 (4.0)	106 (4.2)	228 (9.0)	280 (11.0)	282 (11.1)	278 (10.9)	202 (8.0)	281 (11.1)	229 (9.0)	141 (5.6)	2,349 (92.6)
Average rainy days	15.7	13.4	14.8	14.3	22.9	24.4	24.7	24.6	21.1	23.4	20.7	17.5	237.5
Source: Meteoblue (modeled/calculated data, not measured locally)

== Demographics ==
Population census of Hadji Muhtamad
Year	Pop.	±% p.a.
2007	20,292	—
2010	12,249	−16.78%
2015	25,085	+14.63%
2020	26,867	+1.45%
2024	30,122	+2.78%
Source: Philippine Statistics Authority

In the 2024 census, Hadji Muhtamad had a population of 30,122.

== Economy ==
Poverty Incidence of Hadji Muhtamad

Source: Philippine Statistics Authority
