= Tipo-Tipo =

Municipality in Basilan, Philippines

Tipo-Tipo تيڤو-تيڤو
- Municipality
- Municipality of Tipo-Tipo
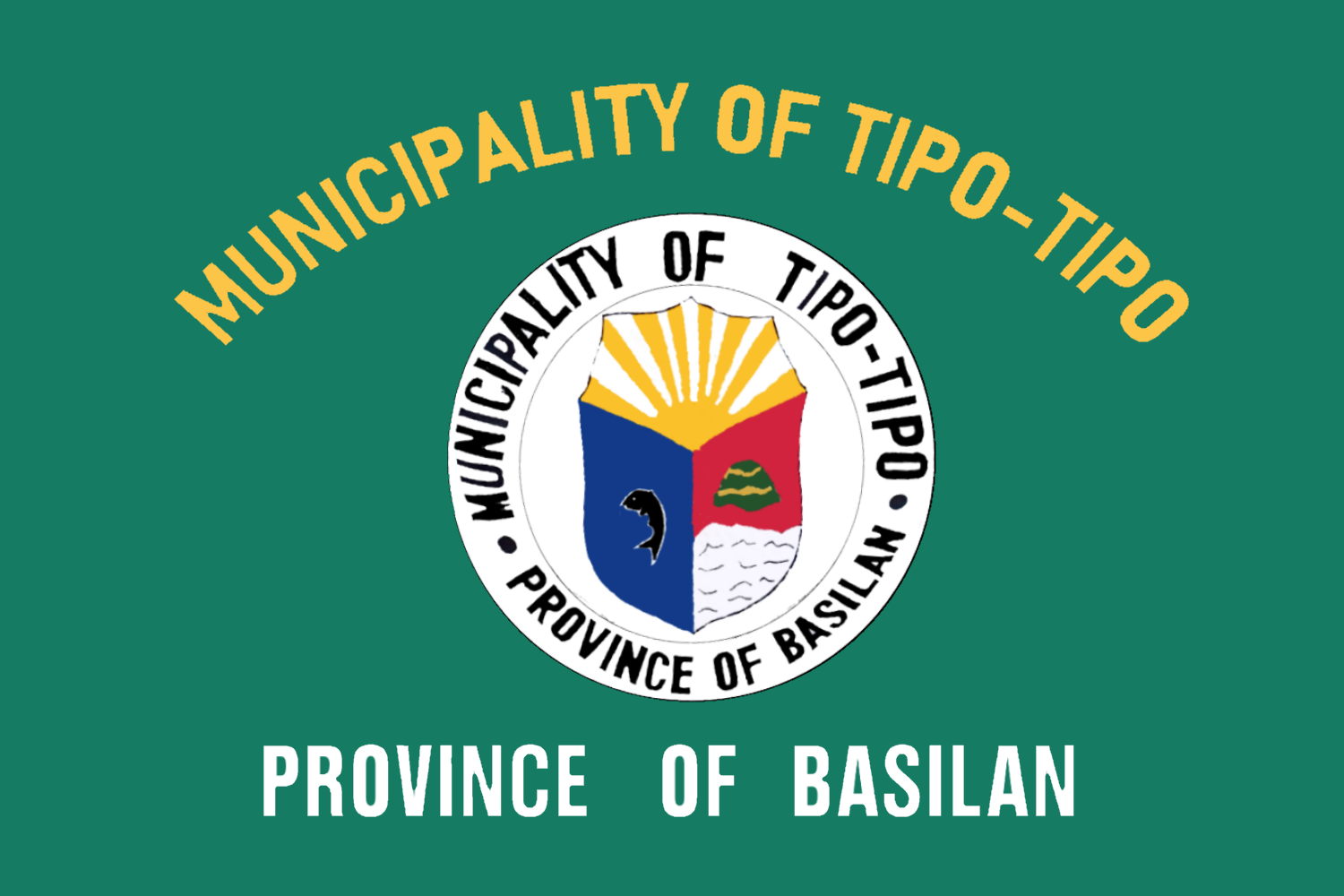
- Flag Seal

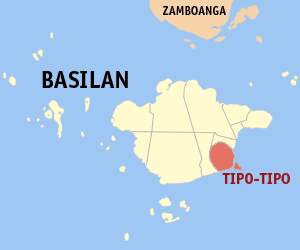
- Map of Basilan with Tipo-Tipo highlighted
- Interactive map of Tipo-Tipo
- Location within the Philippines
- Coordinates: 6°30′02″N 122°07′10″E
- Country: Philippines
- Region: Bangsamoro Autonomous Region in Muslim Mindanao
- Province: Basilan
- House district: Lone district
- Parliamentary district: 2nd district
- Barangays: 11 (see Barangays)

Government
  - Type: Sangguniang Bayan
  - Mayor: Arcam P. Istarul
  - Vice Mayor: Ingatun G. Istarul
  - House Representative: Yusop T. Alano
  - Municipal Council: Members: Radhie G. Mande; Manzur G. Aunal; Faris B. Alauddin; Nurullaji A. Abduhrahman; Abdulwasip T. Dimaporo; Ramil P. Totong; Hujaifa S. Anawie; Muhsir A. Saib
  - Electorate: 14,960 voters (2025)

Area
  - Total: 49.7 km^{2} (19.2 sq mi)
- Elevation: 86 m (282 ft)
- Highest elevation: 583 m (1,913 ft)
- Lowest elevation: 0 m (0 ft)

Population (2024 census)
  - Total: 32,734
  - Density: 659/km^{2} (1,710/sq mi)
  - Households: 4,195

Economy
  - Income class: 4th municipal income class
  - Poverty incidence: 54.32% (2023)
  - Revenue: ₱ 132.9 million (2024)
  - Assets: ₱ 493.9 million (2024)
  - Expenditure: ₱ 116.8 million (2024)
  - Liabilities: ₱ 389.5 million (2024)

Service provider
  - Electricity: Basilan Electric Cooperative (BASELCO)
- Time zone: UTC+8 (PST)
- ZIP code: 7304
- PSGC: 1900706000
- IDD : area code: +63 (0)62
- Native languages: Yakan; Chavacano; Tagalog
- Website: www.tipo-tipo.gov.ph

Tipo-Tipo, officially the Municipality of Tipo-Tipo (Tausūg: Lupa' Tipo-Tipo; Chavacano: Municipalidad de Tipo-Tipo; Filipino: Bayan ng Tipo-Tipo), is a municipality in the province of Basilan, Philippines. According to the 2024 census, it has a population of 32,734 people.

In 2006, the municipalities of Al-Barka and Ungkaya Pukan were created from Tipo-Tipo, reducing its number of barangays from 39 to 11.

Tipo-Tipo was the site of the 2007 Basilan beheading incident where Abu Sayyaf bandits beheaded 14 Philippine Marines, as well as two subsequent battles in April 2014 and April 2016.

== Geography ==
=== Barangays ===
Tipo-Tipo is politically subdivided into 11 barangays. Each barangay consists of puroks while some have sitios.

PSGC	Barangay	Population			±% p.a.	
		2024		2010		
150706002	Badja	9.4%	3,072	2,156	▴	2.49%
150706017	Baguindan	6.1%	1,989	1,937	▴	0.18%
150706018	Banah	5.8%	1,900	1,868	▴	0.12%
150706038	Bangcuang	2.7%	891	839	▴	0.42%
150706019	Bohe-Tambak	2.9%	958	560	▴	3.80%
150706003	Bohebaca	3.9%	1,288	1,280	▴	0.04%
150706004	Bohelebung	7.0%	2,305	2,270	▴	0.11%
150706011	Lagayas	2.9%	955	736	▴	1.83%
150706012	Limbo-Upas	3.4%	1,117	1,124	▾	−0.04%
150706030	Silangkum	5.2%	1,705	1,560	▴	0.62%
150706016	Tipo-tipo Proper (Poblacion)	9.1%	2,983	2,648	▴	0.83%
	Total		32,734	16,978	▴	4.67%

=== Climate ===
Climate data for Tipo-Tipo, Basilan
Month	Jan	Feb	Mar	Apr	May	Jun	Jul	Aug	Sep	Oct	Nov	Dec	Year
Mean daily maximum °C (°F)	26 (79)	26 (79)	26 (79)	26 (79)	27 (81)	27 (81)	27 (81)	27 (81)	27 (81)	27 (81)	27 (81)	26 (79)	27 (80)
Mean daily minimum °C (°F)	25 (77)	25 (77)	25 (77)	26 (79)	26 (79)	26 (79)	26 (79)	26 (79)	26 (79)	26 (79)	26 (79)	26 (79)	26 (79)
Average precipitation mm (inches)	106 (4.2)	77 (3.0)	91 (3.6)	104 (4.1)	236 (9.3)	321 (12.6)	325 (12.8)	306 (12.0)	227 (8.9)	271 (10.7)	204 (8.0)	115 (4.5)	2,383 (93.7)
Average rainy days	15.3	13.8	17.7	15.5	23.1	24.5	24.3	24.6	21.1	22.9	20.1	16.6	239.5
Source: Meteoblue (modeled/calculated data, not measured locally)

== Demographics ==
Population census of Tipo-Tipo
Year	Pop.	±% p.a.
1960	13,726	—
1970	14,047	+0.23%
1975	18,364	+5.52%
1980	24,249	+5.72%
1990	33,160	+3.18%
1995	46,866	+6.70%
2000	48,284	+0.64%
2007	26,548	−7.92%
2010	16,978	−15.01%
2015	19,163	+2.33%
2020	25,531	+6.22%
2024	32,734	+6.15%
Source: Philippine Statistics Authority

In the 2024 census, Tipo-Tipo had a population of 32,734. The population density was 660 inhabitants per square kilometre (1,700/sq mi).

== Economy ==
Poverty Incidence of Tipo-Tipo

Source: Philippine Statistics Authority

== See also ==
- Ingatun-Lukman Gumuntul Istarul, mayor
- Jakaria Tanasalun Emmo, Vice Mayor (1980-1986)
