= Al-Barka =

Municipality in Basilan, Philippines

Al-Barka البركا
- Municipality
- Municipality of Al-Barka
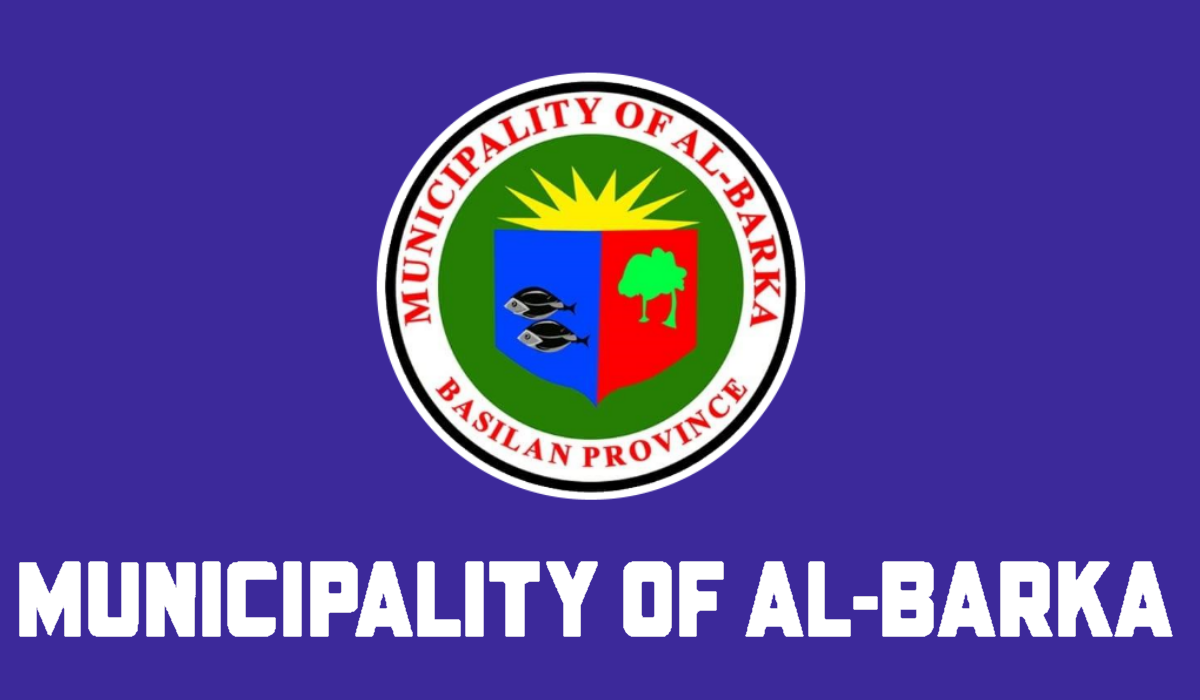
- Flag

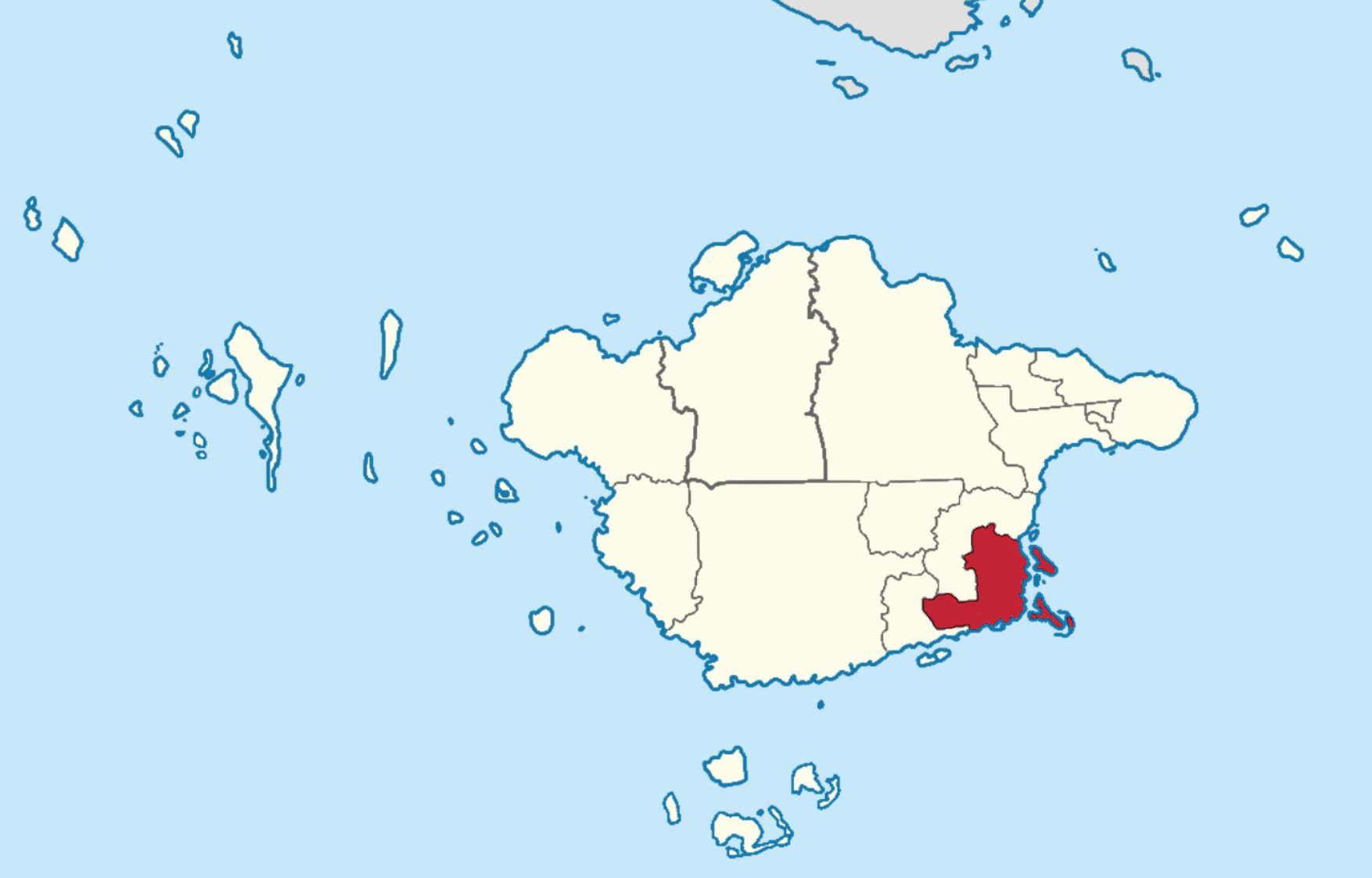
- Map of Basilan with Al-Barka highlighted
- Interactive map of Al-Barka
- Location in the Philippines
- Coordinates: 6°29′29″N 122°08′31″E
- Country: Philippines
- Region: Bangsamoro Autonomous Region in Muslim Mindanao
- Province: Basilan
- House district: Lone district
- Parliamentary district: 2nd district
- Founded: May 22, 2006
- Barangays: 16 (see Barangays)

Government
  - Type: Sangguniang Bayan
  - Mayor: Jaydeefar J. Lajid
  - Vice Mayor: Darussalam S. Lajid
  - House Representative: Yusop T. Alano
  - Municipal Council: Members: Alimran K. Abdasal; Jerham K. Pising; Mahruf H. Asnawi; Khalid H. Jairatul; Appan I. Awal; Delma S. Abdil; Abdulsaid H. Ishak; Sitti Marha A. Mujajilun
  - Electorate: 13,664 voters (2025)

Area
  - Total: 72.58 km^{2} (28.02 sq mi)
- Elevation: 41 m (135 ft)
- Highest elevation: 993 m (3,258 ft)
- Lowest elevation: 0 m (0 ft)

Population (2024 census)
  - Total: 30,318
  - Density: 417.7/km^{2} (1,082/sq mi)
  - Households: 4,221

Economy
  - Income class: 4th municipal income class
  - Poverty incidence: 54.47% (2023)
  - Revenue: ₱ 119.7 million (2024)
  - Assets: ₱ 410.6 million (2024)
  - Expenditure: ₱ 70.91 million (2024)
  - Liabilities: ₱ 389.7 million (2024)

Service provider
  - Electricity: Basilan Electric Cooperative (BASELCO)
- Time zone: UTC+8 (PST)
- ZIP code: 7304
- PSGC: 1900709000
- IDD : area code: +63 (0)62
- Native languages: Yakan; Chavacano; Tagalog

Al-Barka, officially the Municipality of Al-Barka (Tausūg: Lupah Al-Barka; Chavacano: Municipalidad de Al-Barka; Tagalog: Bayan ng Al-Barka), is a municipality in the province of Basilan, Philippines. According to the 2024 census, it has a population of 30,318 people.

The municipality was established under Muslim Mindanao Autonomy Act No. 191, which was ratified through a plebiscite on May 22, 2006. It comprises 16 barangays that were formerly part of Tipo-Tipo.

== Geography ==
=== Barangays ===
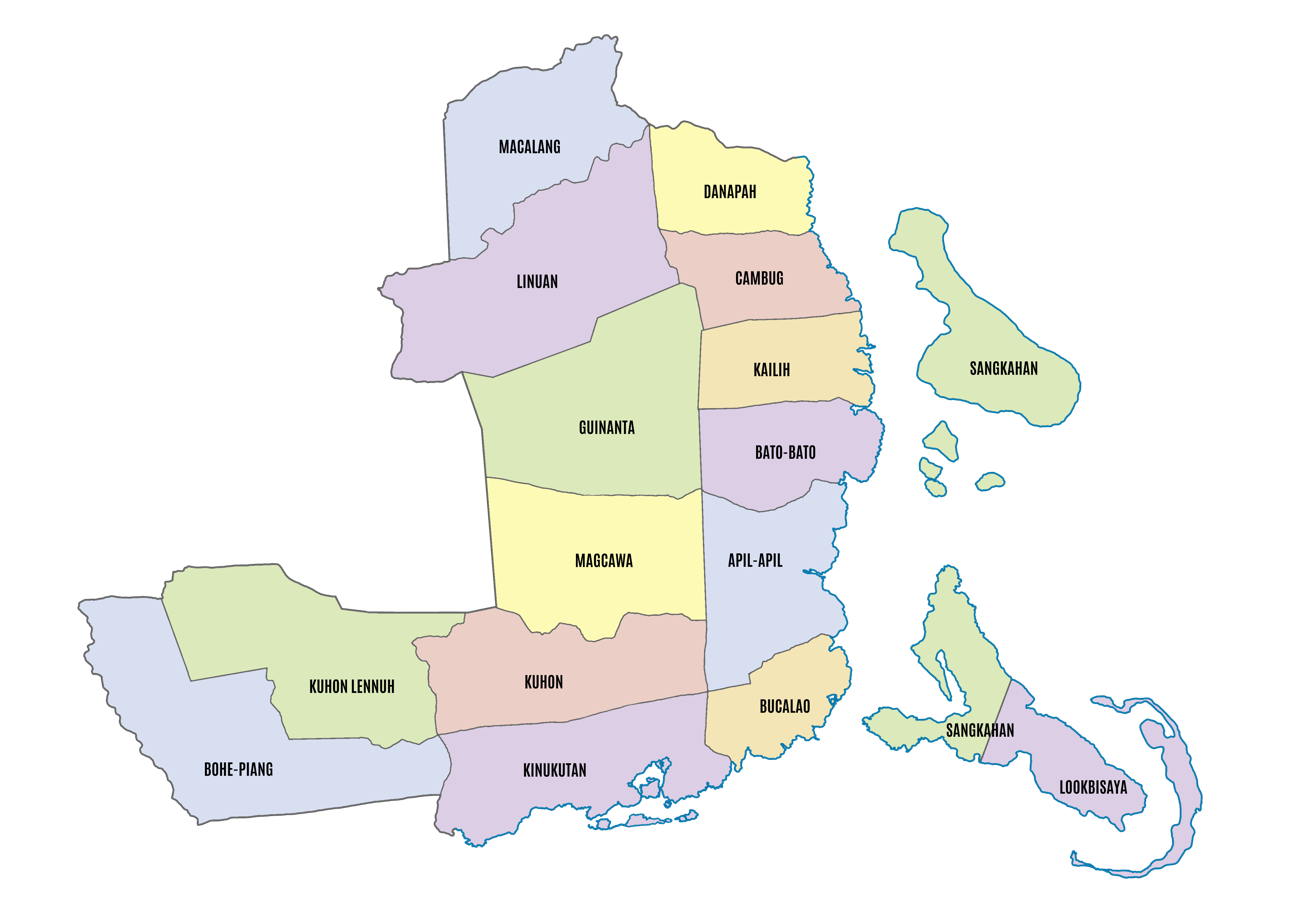
Political map of Al Barka, Basilan

Al-Barka is politically subdivided into 16 barangays. Each barangay consists of puroks while some have sitios.

PSGC	Barangay	Population			±% p.a.	
		2024		2010		
150709001	Apil-apil	3.0%	895	1,061	▾	−1.17%
150709002	Bato-bato	3.4%	1,036	1,065	▾	−0.19%
150709003	Bohe-Piang	3.7%	1,115	1,116	▾	−0.01%
150709004	Bucalao	6.3%	1,923	1,717	▴	0.79%
150709005	Cambug	4.5%	1,353	1,411	▾	−0.29%
150709006	Danapah	4.3%	1,290	1,311	▾	−0.11%
150709007	Guinanta	7.0%	2,111	2,072	▴	0.13%
150709008	Kailih	5.0%	1,520	1,199	▴	1.66%
150709009	Kinukutan	3.8%	1,142	966	▴	1.17%
150709010	Kuhon	3.5%	1,071	987	▴	0.57%
150709011	Kuhon Lennuh	4.0%	1,226	1,144	▴	0.48%
150709012	Linuan	3.4%	1,042	731	▴	2.49%
150709013	Lookbisaya (Kaulungan Island)	5.2%	1,564	1,468	▴	0.44%
150709014	Macalang	2.3%	688	535	▴	1.76%
150709015	Magcawa	6.9%	2,094	2,011	▴	0.28%
150709016	Sangkahan (Kaulungan Island)	2.8%	835	729	▴	0.95%
	Total		30,318	19,523	▴	3.10%

=== Climate ===
Climate data for Al-Barka, Basilan
Month	Jan	Feb	Mar	Apr	May	Jun	Jul	Aug	Sep	Oct	Nov	Dec	Year
Mean daily maximum °C (°F)	28 (82)	27 (81)	28 (82)	28 (82)	28 (82)	28 (82)	28 (82)	28 (82)	28 (82)	28 (82)	28 (82)	28 (82)	28 (82)
Mean daily minimum °C (°F)	27 (81)	27 (81)	27 (81)	27 (81)	28 (82)	28 (82)	28 (82)	28 (82)	28 (82)	28 (82)	28 (82)	27 (81)	28 (82)
Average precipitation mm (inches)	130 (5.1)	91 (3.6)	100 (3.9)	114 (4.5)	242 (9.5)	329 (13.0)	347 (13.7)	321 (12.6)	223 (8.8)	273 (10.7)	239 (9.4)	140 (5.5)	2,549 (100.3)
Average rainy days	16.5	14.3	14.9	15.5	23.8	25.3	25.3	25.3	21.5	23.0	21.1	17.5	244
Source: Meteoblue (modeled/calculated data, not measured locally)

== Demographics ==
Population census of Al-Barka
Year	Pop.	±% p.a.
2007	26,229	—
2010	19,523	−10.19%
2015	20,905	+1.31%
2020	23,736	+2.71%
2024	30,318	+6.05%
Source: Philippine Statistics Authority

In the 2024 census, Al-Barka had a population of 30,318. The population density was 330 inhabitants per square kilometre (850/sq mi).

== Economy ==
Poverty Incidence of Al-Barka

Source: Philippine Statistics Authority
