= Hadji Mohammad Ajul =

Municipality in Basilan, Philippines

Hadji Mohammad Ajul حدجي محمد اجول
- Municipality
- Municipality of Hadji Mohammad Ajul
- Seal

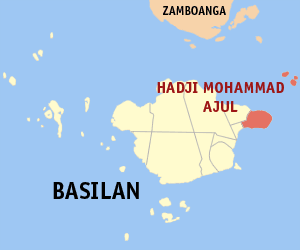
- Map of Basilan with Hadji Mohammad Ajul highlighted
- Interactive map of Hadji Mohammad Ajul
- Location within the Philippines
- Coordinates: 6°38′33″N 122°16′21″E
- Country: Philippines
- Region: Bangsamoro Autonomous Region in Muslim Mindanao
- Province: Basilan
- House district: Lone district
- Parliamentary district: 2nd district
- Founded: May 22, 2006
- Barangays: 11 (see Barangays)

Government
  - Type: Sangguniang Bayan
  - Mayor: Talib G. Pawaki
  - Vice Mayor: Tirmiji J.Pawaki
  - House Representative: Yusop T. Alano
  - Municipal Council: Members: Muruwa P. Alano; Batah Tajallain; Marwan J.Pawaki; Al-Dhanrif Benjamin C. Pawaki; Allan Yunus; Adzmar Anuddin; Nasher Ibrahim; Rico Sali ABC President: Warfa T. Sumampil SK Federation President: Benzar A. Jaiyari IPMR: Mar-Inn Grace S. Atal
  - Electorate: 19,547 voters (2025)

Area
  - Total: 41.02 km^{2} (15.84 sq mi)
- Elevation: 34 m (112 ft)
- Highest elevation: 1,041 m (3,415 ft)
- Lowest elevation: 0 m (0 ft)

Population (2024 census)
  - Total: 32,806
  - Density: 799.8/km^{2} (2,071/sq mi)
  - Households: 3,818

Economy
  - Income class: 4th municipal income class
  - Poverty incidence: 56.81% (2023)
  - Revenue: ₱ 121 million (2024)
  - Assets: ₱ 249.3 million (2024)
  - Expenditure: ₱ 65.58 million (2024)
  - Liabilities: ₱ 207.6 million (2024)

Service provider
  - Electricity: Basilan Electric Cooperative (BASELCO)
- Time zone: UTC+8 (PST)
- ZIP code: 7306
- PSGC: 1900710000
- IDD : area code: +63 (0)62
- Native languages: Yakan; Chavacano; Tagalog

Hadji Mohammad Ajul, officially the Municipality of Hadji Mohammad Ajul (Tausūg: Lupah Hadji Mohammad Ajul; Chavacano: Municipalidad de Hadji Mohammad Ajul; Tagalog: Bayan ng Hadji Mohammad Ajul), is a municipality in the province of Basilan, Philippines. According to the 2024 census, it has a population of 32,806 people.

It was created by Muslim Mindanao Autonomy Act No. 192, ratified by plebiscite on May 22, 2006. It is composed of 11 barangays that were formerly part of Tuburan.

== Geography ==
=== Barangays ===
Hadji Mohammad Ajul is politically subdivided into 11 barangays. Each barangay consists of puroks while some have sitios.

PSGC	Barangay	Population			±% p.a.	
		2024		2010		
150710001	Basakan	8.5%	2,785	1,035	▴	7.12%
150710002	Buton	17.3%	5,660	2,460	▴	5.96%
150710003	Candiis	10.0%	3,279	1,330	▴	6.47%
150710004	Langil	6.8%	2,222	1,245	▴	4.11%
150710005	Langong	4.7%	1,548	1,084	▴	2.51%
150710006	Languyan	8.9%	2,904	1,043	▴	7.37%
150710007	Pintasan	6.9%	2,273	1,084	▴	5.28%
150710008	Seronggon	9.8%	3,226	1,409	▴	5.92%
150710009	Sibago	7.7%	2,541	1,301	▴	4.76%
150710010	Sulutan Matangal	7.2%	2,373	1,171	▴	5.03%
150710011	Tuburan Proper (Poblacion)	12.2%	3,995	2,800	▴	2.50%
	Total		32,806	15,962	▴	5.13%

=== Climate ===
Climate data for Hadji Mohammad Ajul, Basilan
Month	Jan	Feb	Mar	Apr	May	Jun	Jul	Aug	Sep	Oct	Nov	Dec	Year
Mean daily maximum °C (°F)	28 (82)	27 (81)	28 (82)	28 (82)	28 (82)	28 (82)	28 (82)	28 (82)	28 (82)	28 (82)	28 (82)	28 (82)	28 (82)
Mean daily minimum °C (°F)	27 (81)	27 (81)	27 (81)	27 (81)	28 (82)	28 (82)	27 (81)	27 (81)	28 (82)	28 (82)	27 (81)	27 (81)	27 (81)
Average precipitation mm (inches)	106 (4.2)	77 (3.0)	91 (3.6)	104 (4.1)	236 (9.3)	321 (12.6)	325 (12.8)	306 (12.0)	227 (8.9)	271 (10.7)	204 (8.0)	115 (4.5)	2,383 (93.7)
Average rainy days	15.3	13.8	17.7	15.5	23.1	24.5	24.3	24.6	21.1	22.9	20.1	16.6	239.5
Source: Meteoblue (modeled/calculated data, not measured locally)

== Demographics ==
Population census of Hadji Mohammad Ajul
Year	Pop.	±% p.a.
2007	26,132	—
2010	15,962	−16.42%
2015	19,307	+3.69%
2020	24,625	+5.25%
2024	32,806	+7.13%
Source: Philippine Statistics Authority

In the 2024 census, Hadji Mohammad Ajul had a population of 32,806. The population density was 800 inhabitants per square kilometre (2,100/sq mi).

== Economy ==
Poverty Incidence of Hadji Mohammad Ajul

Source: Philippine Statistics Authority
