= Maluso =

Municipality in Basilan, Philippines

Maluso مالوسو
- Municipality
- Municipality of Maluso
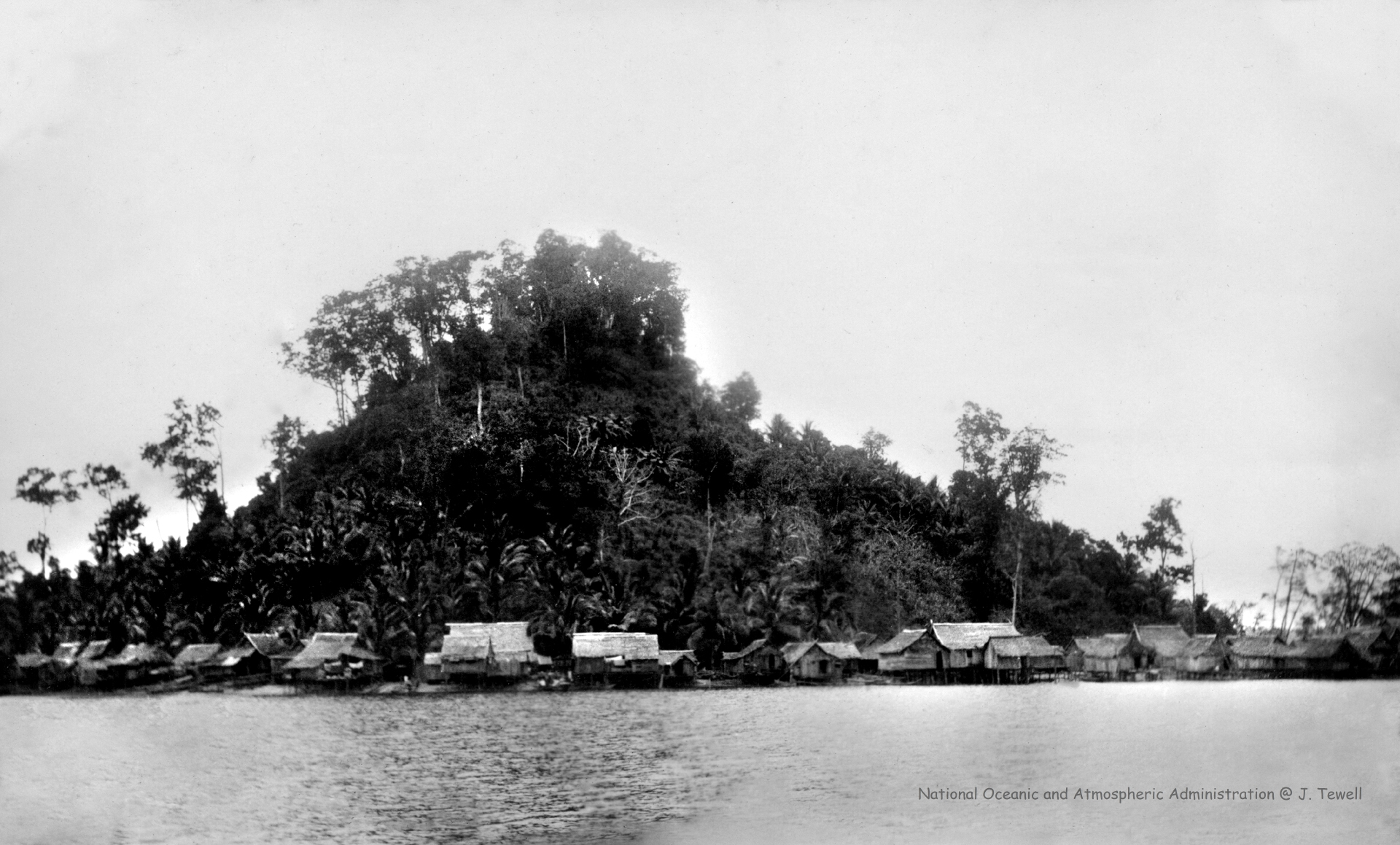
- Gaunan Island, off the coast of Port Holland, Maluso, circa 1926

- Flag Seal

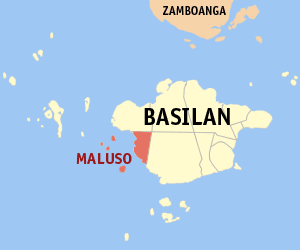
- Map of Basilan with Maluso highlighted
- Interactive map of Maluso
- Location within the Philippines
- Coordinates: 6°32′46″N 121°52′12″E
- Country: Philippines
- Region: Bangsamoro Autonomous Region in Muslim Mindanao
- Province: Basilan
- House district: Lone district
- Parliamentary district: 4th district
- Barangays: 20 (see Barangays)

Government
  - Type: Sangguniang Bayan
  - Mayor: Hanie A. Bud
  - Vice Mayor: Al-Mashor A. Yasin
  - House Representative: Yusop T. Alano
  - Municipal Council: Members: Annual M. Saluway; Abbas T. Barang Jr.; Nurhamin S. Muksan; Munib B. Basa; Muktar K. Abon; Rashedin S. Kamlon; Melanie J. Sonny; Mhoamhar S. Aron
  - Electorate: 30,398 voters (2025)

Area
  - Total: 168.46 km^{2} (65.04 sq mi)
- Elevation: 42 m (138 ft)
- Highest elevation: 874 m (2,867 ft)
- Lowest elevation: 0 m (0 ft)

Population (2024 census)
  - Total: 66,817
  - Density: 396.63/km^{2} (1,027.3/sq mi)
  - Households: 7,195

Economy
  - Income class: 2nd municipal income class
  - Poverty incidence: 43.08% (2023)
  - Revenue: ₱ 188.3 million (2024)
  - Assets: ₱ 605 million (2024)
  - Expenditure: ₱ 89.67 million (2024)
  - Liabilities: ₱ 543.6 million (2024)

Service provider
  - Electricity: Basilan Electric Cooperative (BASELCO)
- Time zone: UTC+8 (PST)
- ZIP code: 7303
- PSGC: 1900704000
- IDD : area code: +63 (0)62
- Native languages: Yakan; Chavacano; Tagalog

Maluso, officially the Municipality of Maluso (Tausūg: Dai'rah Lupah Maluso; Chavacano: Municipalidad de Maluso; Tagalog: Bayan ng Maluso), is a municipality in the province of Basilan, Philippines. According to the 2024 census, it has a population of 66,817 people.

It is geographically located in the Province of Basilan, on the southwestern part of the island, near the Sulu group and Banguingui Isles. In terms of residents living in semi-urban areas, it ranks as the third most populous town after Isabela City and Lamitan City. Maluso is characterized by its beaches, rivers, and extensive mangrove areas. It is also home to diverse ethnolinguistic groups, including the Yakan, Iranun, Banguigui, and Tausug, who coexist with kolono communities from various parts of Luzon and the Visayas, many of whom migrated during the Commonwealth era and later settled permanently. Maluso is one of the core member of Western Basilan Alliance, a group of five municipalities consisted of Maluso, Hji. Muhtamad, Lantawan, Sumisip and Tabuan-Lasa LGUs, sponsored and capacitated by the Spanish government aid agency AECID-funded "MILAB 2" Project, in partnership with the Provincial Government of Basilan.

On July 1, 2022, it launched its flagship program, “Marayaw Maluso: Peace and Eco-Tourism Hub of Southern Philippines", primarily focused on three major key areas: peace, environment and tourism. Maluso is home to Maluso River, locally known as “Subah Maluso”, historically tied with its humble beginnings centuries ago, and a known source of freshwater from European sailors and adventurers of the past.

== Geography ==
=== Barangays ===
Maluso is politically subdivided into 20 barangays. Each barangay consists of puroks while some have sitios.

PSGC	Barangay	Population			±% p.a.	
		2024		2010		
150704001	Abong-Abong	1.4%	965	846	▴	0.92%
150704002	Batungal	1.8%	1,207	924	▴	1.87%
150704003	Calang Canas	4.3%	2,862	1,101	▴	6.86%
150704016	Fuente Maluso	1.8%	1,185	1,261	▾	−0.43%
150704004	Gaunan North (Zone I)	1.6%	1,079	1,089	▾	−0.06%
150704005	Gaunan South (Zone II)	2.0%	1,336	1,202	▴	0.74%
150704006	Limbubong	1.5%	976	1,220	▾	−1.54%
150704007	Mahayahay Lower (Zone I)	0.9%	595	671	▾	−0.83%
150704019	Mahayahay Upper (Zone II)	1.9%	1,252	1,112	▴	0.83%
150704008	Muslim Area	0.8%	509	440	▴	1.02%
150704009	Port Holland Zone I Poblacion (Upper)	5.7%	3,784	3,171	▴	1.24%
150704010	Port Holland Zone II Poblacion (Shipyard Main)	4.0%	2,649	2,436	▴	0.58%
150704011	Port Holland Zone III Poblacion (Samal Village)	6.8%	4,532	3,417	▴	1.98%
150704012	Port Holland Zone IV (Lower)	8.7%	5,834	3,355	▴	3.92%
150704020	Port Holland Zone V (Shipyard Tabuk)	3.1%	2,054	1,444	▴	2.48%
150704015	Taberlongan	2.8%	1,855	2,046	▾	−0.68%
150704017	Tamuk	1.5%	976	1,008	▾	−0.22%
150704013	Townsite (Poblacion)	7.5%	4,993	4,820	▴	0.25%
150704018	Tubigan	2.1%	1,424	1,649	▾	−1.01%
150704021	Upper Garlayan	0.9%	579	591	▾	−0.14%
	Total		66,817	33,803	▴	4.85%

=== Climate ===
Climate data for Maluso, Basilan
Month	Jan	Feb	Mar	Apr	May	Jun	Jul	Aug	Sep	Oct	Nov	Dec	Year
Mean daily maximum °C (°F)	27 (81)	27 (81)	27 (81)	28 (82)	28 (82)	28 (82)	28 (82)	28 (82)	28 (82)	28 (82)	28 (82)	28 (82)	28 (82)
Mean daily minimum °C (°F)	27 (81)	26 (79)	27 (81)	27 (81)	28 (82)	28 (82)	27 (81)	28 (82)	28 (82)	28 (82)	27 (81)	27 (81)	27 (81)
Average precipitation mm (inches)	104 (4.1)	71 (2.8)	87 (3.4)	96 (3.8)	206 (8.1)	262 (10.3)	272 (10.7)	264 (10.4)	181 (7.1)	240 (9.4)	192 (7.6)	109 (4.3)	2,084 (82)
Average rainy days	14.3	12.8	14.3	14.2	21.8	23.3	24.1	24.0	19.7	21.8	19.4	15.4	225.1
Source: Meteoblue (modeled/calculated data, not measured locally)

== Demographics ==
Population census of Maluso
Year	Pop.	±% p.a.
1960	16,869	—
1970	15,519	−0.83%
1975	12,665	−3.99%
1980	17,287	+6.42%
1990	18,666	+0.77%
1995	26,844	+7.05%
2000	31,054	+3.17%
2007	48,178	+6.24%
2010	33,803	−12.10%
2015	40,646	+3.57%
2020	45,730	+2.51%
2024	66,817	+9.53%
Source: Philippine Statistics Authority

In the 2020 census, Maluso had a population of 45,730. The population density was 270 inhabitants per square kilometre (700/sq mi).

== Economy ==
Poverty Incidence of Maluso

Source: Philippine Statistics Authority
