= Tuburan, Basilan =

Municipality in Basilan, Philippines

Tuburan توبورن
- Municipality
- Municipality of Tuburan
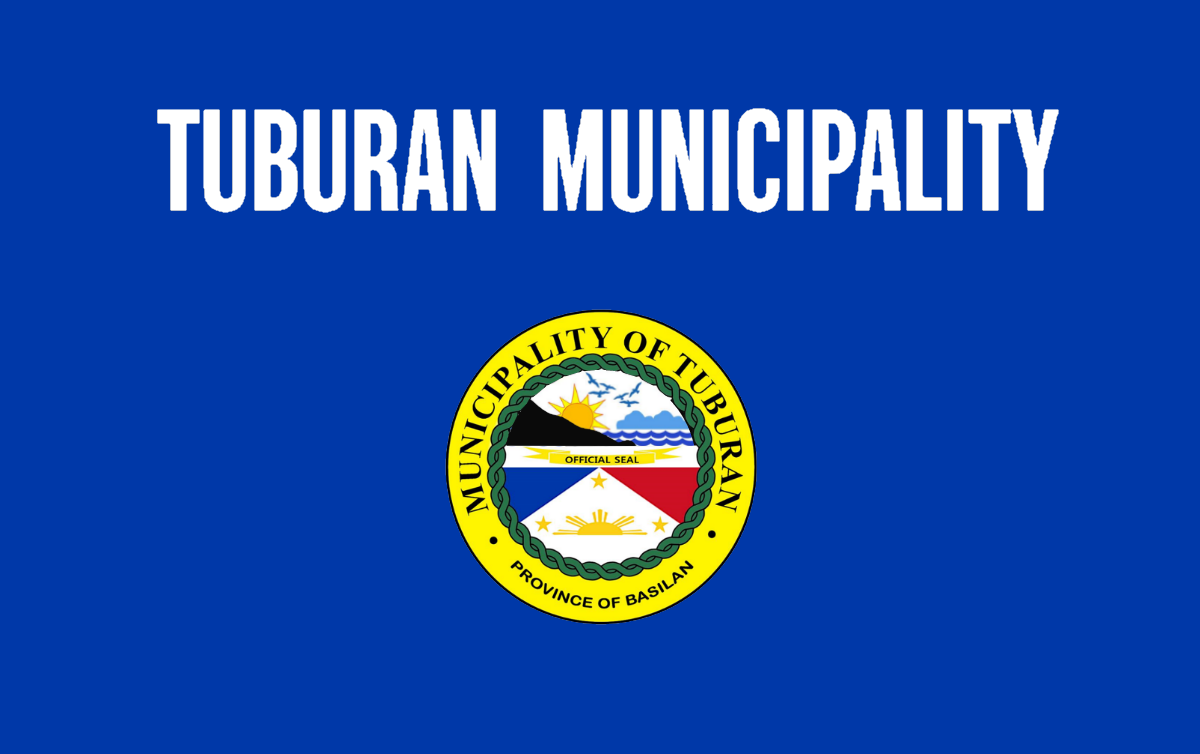
- Flag Seal

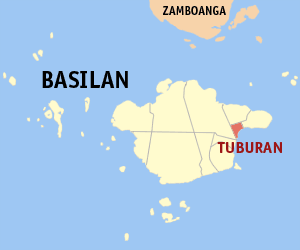
- Map of Basilan with Tuburan highlighted
- Interactive map of Tuburan
- Location within the Philippines
- Coordinates: 6°36′41″N 122°11′11″E
- Country: Philippines
- Region: Bangsamoro Autonomous Region in Muslim Mindanao
- Province: Basilan
- House district: Lone district
- Parliamentary district: 2nd district
- Barangays: 10 (see Barangays)

Government
  - Type: Sangguniang Bayan
  - Mayor: Durie S. Kallahal
  - Vice Mayor: Husin L. Kalang
  - House Representative: Yusop T. Alano
  - Municipal Council: Members: Jhaber Kallahal; Falcon Latip; Jemar Kalang; Hapija Keseng; Usman Kalang; Alih H. Abdurahman; Hasan Abdurajak; Ping A. Kasim
  - Electorate: 7,512 voters (2025)

Area
  - Total: 546.00 km^{2} (210.81 sq mi)
- Elevation: 78 m (256 ft)
- Highest elevation: 613 m (2,011 ft)
- Lowest elevation: 0 m (0 ft)

Population (2024 census)
  - Total: 30,027
  - Density: 54.995/km^{2} (142.44/sq mi)
  - Households: 4,012

Economy
  - Income class: 2nd municipal income class
  - Poverty incidence: 44.82% (2023)
  - Revenue: ₱ 212.3 million (2024)
  - Assets: ₱ 295 million (2024)
  - Expenditure: ₱ 213.4 million (2024)
  - Liabilities: ₱ 134.1 million (2024)

Service provider
  - Electricity: Basilan Electric Cooperative (BASELCO)
- Time zone: UTC+8 (PST)
- ZIP code: 7306
- PSGC: 1900707000
- IDD : area code: +63 (0)62
- Native languages: Yakan; Chavacano; Tagalog

Tuburan, officially the Municipality of Tuburan (Tausūg: Lupah Tuburan; Chavacano: Municipalidad de Tuburan; Tagalog: Bayan ng Tuburan), is a municipality in the province of Basilan, Philippines. According to the 2024 census, it has a population of 30,027 people.

In 2006, the municipalities of Akbar and Hadji Mohammad Ajul were created from Tuburan, reducing its number of barangays from 30 to 10.

== Geography ==
=== Barangays ===
Tuburan is politically subdivided into 10 barangays. Each barangay consists of puroks while some have sitios.

PSGC	Barangay	Population			±% p.a.	
		2024		2010		
150707016	Bohetambis	4.3%	1,290	1,108	▴	1.06%
150707034	Calut	13.8%	4,146	4,254	▾	−0.18%
150707021	Duga-a	9.8%	2,934	2,433	▴	1.31%
150707040	Katipunan	4.7%	1,405	1,340	▴	0.33%
150707005	Lahi-lahi	7.5%	2,239	1,877	▴	1.23%
150707028	Lower Sinangkapan	8.8%	2,652	2,333	▴	0.89%
150707041	Lower Tablas	2.3%	704	919	▾	−1.83%
150707025	Mahawid	6.6%	1,975	2,175	▾	−0.67%
150707010	Sinulatan	3.3%	983	829	▴	1.19%
150707033	Tablas Usew	6.3%	1,879	1,720	▴	0.62%
	Total		30,027	18,988	▴	3.23%

=== Climate ===
Climate data for Tuburan, Basilan
Month	Jan	Feb	Mar	Apr	May	Jun	Jul	Aug	Sep	Oct	Nov	Dec	Year
Mean daily maximum °C (°F)	27 (81)	27 (81)	27 (81)	27 (81)	28 (82)	28 (82)	28 (82)	28 (82)	28 (82)	28 (82)	28 (82)	27 (81)	28 (82)
Mean daily minimum °C (°F)	26 (79)	26 (79)	26 (79)	27 (81)	27 (81)	27 (81)	27 (81)	27 (81)	27 (81)	27 (81)	27 (81)	27 (81)	27 (81)
Average precipitation mm (inches)	106 (4.2)	77 (3.0)	91 (3.6)	104 (4.1)	236 (9.3)	321 (12.6)	325 (12.8)	306 (12.0)	227 (8.9)	271 (10.7)	204 (8.0)	115 (4.5)	2,383 (93.7)
Average rainy days	15.3	13.8	17.7	15.5	23.1	24.5	24.3	24.6	21.1	22.9	20.1	16.6	239.5
Source: Meteoblue (modeled/calculated data, not measured locally)

== Demographics ==
Population census of Tuburan
Year	Pop.	±% p.a.
1960	16,800	—
1970	19,349	+1.42%
1975	17,237	−2.29%
1980	17,328	+0.11%
1990	26,880	+4.49%
1995	31,249	+2.86%
2000	42,550	+6.84%
2007	26,498	−6.32%
2010	18,988	−11.42%
2015	20,207	+1.19%
2020	24,742	+4.35%
2024	30,027	+4.76%
Source: Philippine Statistics Authority

In the 2024 census, Tuburan had a population of 30,027.

== Economy ==
Poverty Incidence of Tuburan

Source: Philippine Statistics Authority
