= Results of the 2026 Bangsamoro Parliament election =

This is a breakdown of the results of the 2026 Bangsamoro Parliament election.

== Proportional representation ==
=== Summary ===
Party	Votes	%	Seats
Bangsamoro Federalist Party	678,328	35.86	16
United Bangsamoro Justice Party	613,663	32.44	15
BARMM Grand Coalition	391,266	20.68	8
Raayat Democratic Party	68,839	3.64	1
Progresibong Bangsamoro Party	36,672	1.94	0
Bangsamoro Party	35,777	1.89	0
BEST Party	26,926	1.42	0
Mahardika Party	14,800	0.78	0
Alliance of Bangsamoro Tri-Peoples Party	11,428	0.60	0
Mushawara Party	8,054	0.43	0
ISAMA Party	3,312	0.18	0
Partido Bangon Bangsamoro	2,594	0.14	0
Total	1,891,659	100.00	40
Valid votes	1,891,659	93.72	
Invalid/blank votes (Note: Includes 16,752 votes for Moro Ako Party, which was disqualified.)	126,819	6.28	
Total votes	2,018,478	100.00	
Registered voters/turnout	2,393,202	84.34	
Source: Commission on Elections, Philippine News Agency

=== Elected nominees ===
The following nominees were elected:

Name	Party
Suwaib Oranon (Note: Incumbent member of the Bangsamoro Transition Authority Parliament before the election.)	Bangsamoro Federalist Party
Abdulwahid Halil	Bangsamoro Federalist Party
Akmad Brahim	Bangsamoro Federalist Party
Dan Asnawie	Bangsamoro Federalist Party
Abunawas Maslamama	Bangsamoro Federalist Party
Johari Abu	Bangsamoro Federalist Party
Camid Gandamra Jr.	Bangsamoro Federalist Party
Karwin Hamjani	Bangsamoro Federalist Party
Kitem Kadatuan Jr.	Bangsamoro Federalist Party
Michael Midtimbang	Bangsamoro Federalist Party
Suraija Reina Hataman	Bangsamoro Federalist Party
Ma-arouph Candao	Bangsamoro Federalist Party
Alindatu Pagayao	Bangsamoro Federalist Party
Zulfikar-Ali Bayam	Bangsamoro Federalist Party
Jaafar Apollo Mikhail Matalam	Bangsamoro Federalist Party
Junalyn Sumlay	Bangsamoro Federalist Party
Murad Ebrahim	United Bangsamoro Justice Party
Mohagher Iqbal	United Bangsamoro Justice Party
Ali Solaiman	United Bangsamoro Justice Party
Eduard Guerra	United Bangsamoro Justice Party
Ibrahim Ali	United Bangsamoro Justice Party
Said Salendab	United Bangsamoro Justice Party
Mohammad Yacob	United Bangsamoro Justice Party
Amir Balindong	United Bangsamoro Justice Party
John Anthony Lim	United Bangsamoro Justice Party
Haber Asarul	United Bangsamoro Justice Party
Sha Elijah Dumama-Alba	United Bangsamoro Justice Party
Nordjiana Dipatuan-Ducol	United Bangsamoro Justice Party
Raissa Jajurie	United Bangsamoro Justice Party
Said Shiek	United Bangsamoro Justice Party
Ali Salik	United Bangsamoro Justice Party
Mamintal Adiong III	BARMM Grand Coalition
Amer Zaakaria Rakim	BARMM Grand Coalition
Abdulrahman Mangudadatu	BARMM Grand Coalition
Datu Bimbo Sinsuat	BARMM Grand Coalition
Hanie Bud	BARMM Grand Coalition
Abdel Razi Amin	BARMM Grand Coalition
Sittie Aisah Pansar	BARMM Grand Coalition
Amil Bahar Mawallil	BARMM Grand Coalition
Jose Lorena	Raayat Democratic Party

=== By province and city ===
Province/City	BFP		UBJP		BGC		Raayat		Others	
Province/City	Votes	%	Votes	%	Votes	%	Votes	%	Votes	%
Basilan	82,910	41.02	43,119	21.33	60,415	29.89	1,927	0.95	13,735	6.80
Cotabato City	39,530	47.63	34,726	41.84	1,043	1.26	973	1.17	6,727	8.10
Lanao del Sur	131,113	21.51	178,424	29.28	210,606	34.56	48,356	7.93	40,942	6.72
Maguindanao del Norte (Note: Excludes the votes from Cotabato City.)	150,693	50.87	113,259	38.23	11,810	3.99	5,184	1.75	15,291	5.16
Maguindanao del Sur	147,081	37.09	143,072	36.08	83,150	20.97	8,867	2.24	14,411	3.63
Special Geographic Area	14,087	13.83	80,455	78.96	146	0.14	725	0.71	6,476	6.36
Tawi-Tawi	112,914	55.79	20,608	10.18	24,096	11.90	2,807	1.39	41,981	20.74
Total	678,328	35.86	613,663	32.44	391,266	20.68	68,839	3.64	139,563	7.38
Source: Commission on Elections

== District representation ==
=== Summary ===
Party or alliance		Votes	%	Seats
Bangsamoro Federalist Party (Note: Includes the votes for Abdulraof Macacua, who ran in Maguindanao del Norte's 3rd district as an independent candidate.)		624,188	33.00	15
United Bangsamoro Justice Party		580,227	30.67	9
BARMM Grand Coalition	Serbisyong Inklusibo–Alyansang Progresibo	345,506	18.26	6
BARMM Grand Coalition	Al Ittihad–UKB Party	74,584	3.94	1
BARMM Grand Coalition	Bangsamoro Peoples Party	48,132	2.54	0
BARMM Grand Coalition	BARMM Grand Coalition	22,939	1.21	0
BARMM Grand Coalition	Total	491,161	25.96	7
Bangsamoro Party		53,618	2.83	0
Progresibong Bangsamoro Party		41,428	2.19	1
Mahardika Party		8,676	0.46	0
BEST Party		2,704	0.14	0
Independent		89,758	4.74	0
Total		1,891,760	100.00	32
Valid votes		1,891,760	93.72	
Invalid/blank votes		126,718	6.28	
Total votes		2,018,478	100.00	
Registered voters/turnout		2,393,202	84.34	
Source: Commission on Elections, Philippine News Agency

=== Basilan ===
==== Basilan's 1st district ====
Candidate	Party	Votes	%
Rima Hassan	Bangsamoro Federalist Party	21,933	52.38
Hegem Furigay	Bangsamoro Peoples Party	14,733	35.19
Rajan Abdurahman	United Bangsamoro Justice Party	4,491	10.73
Abubakar Cutal	Bangsamoro Party	714	1.71
Total		41,871	100.00
Source: Commission on Elections

==== Basilan's 2nd district ====
Candidate	Party	Votes	%
Pai Sali	United Bangsamoro Justice Party	27,954	48.17
Abdulsamie Kallahal	Bangsamoro Peoples Party	25,035	43.14
Abbas Salung	Bangsamoro Federalist Party	4,961	8.55
Abath Kinjing	Independent	37	0.06
Khalid Hassan	Bangsamoro Party	30	0.05
Altun Angeles	Independent	15	0.03
Total		58,032	100.00
Source: Commission on Elections

==== Basilan's 3rd district ====
Candidate	Party	Votes	%
Abrar Hataman	Bangsamoro Federalist Party	45,094	90.64
Khan Hasalal	Bangsamoro Party	4,656	9.36
Total		49,750	100.00
Source: Commission on Elections

==== Basilan's 4th district ====
Candidate	Party	Votes	%
Jay Hataman Salliman	Bangsamoro Federalist Party	41,675	81.51
Alzad Sattar	Bangsamoro Peoples Party	8,364	16.36
Monar Ibno	Bangsamoro Party	562	1.10
Omar Muallam	United Bangsamoro Justice Party	424	0.83
Pendatun Mohamad	BEST Party	101	0.20
Total		51,126	100.00
Source: Commission on Elections

=== Cotabato City ===
==== Cotabato City's 1st district ====
Candidate	Party	Votes	%
Sheriff Abas	United Bangsamoro Justice Party	12,334	57.75
Romeo Sema	Mahardika Party	8,676	40.63
Danilo Liggayo	BEST Party	346	1.62
Total		21,356	100.00
Source: Commission on Elections

==== Cotabato City's 2nd district ====
Candidate	Party	Votes	%
Naguib Sinarimbo	Bangsamoro Federalist Party	31,114	77.91
Teng Midtimbang	United Bangsamoro Justice Party	8,411	21.06
Dick Datumanong	Bangsamoro Party	246	0.62
Enggay Chua	Independent	167	0.42
Total		39,938	100.00
Source: Commission on Elections

==== Cotabato City's 3rd district ====
Candidate	Party	Votes	%
Tomanda Antok	Bangsamoro Federalist Party	9,223	49.92
Hashim Manticayan	United Bangsamoro Justice Party	8,970	48.55
Reynaldo Canen	BEST Party	283	1.53
Total		18,476	100.00
Source: Commission on Elections

=== Lanao del Sur ===
==== Lanao del Sur's 1st district ====
Candidate	Party	Votes	%
Pala Gandamra	Serbisyong Inklusibo–Alyansang Progresibo	63,832	84.71
Abdulrahman Taher	United Bangsamoro Justice Party	8,325	11.05
Rudy Dianalan	Progresibong Bangsamoro Party	2,762	3.67
Rolly Tomawis	Independent	168	0.22
Abdul Aziz Macalangun Jr.	Bangsamoro Party	148	0.20
Almen Pangandaman	Independent	121	0.16
Total		75,356	100.00
Source: Commission on Elections

==== Lanao del Sur's 2nd district ====
Candidate	Party	Votes	%
Hamza Gauraki	United Bangsamoro Justice Party	41,393	52.90
Boyet Alonto	Serbisyong Inklusibo–Alyansang Progresibo	36,477	46.62
Salahuden Edres	Independent	305	0.39
Samanudin Bazer	Progresibong Bangsamoro Party	66	0.08
Total		78,241	100.00
Source: Commission on Elections

==== Lanao del Sur's 3rd district ====
Candidate	Party	Votes	%
Rauf Adiong	Serbisyong Inklusibo–Alyansang Progresibo	55,714	66.62
Edrieza Rimbang	Independent	19,996	23.91
James Macaraya	United Bangsamoro Justice Party	7,628	9.12
Saleha Mangurun	Independent	287	0.34
Total		83,625	100.00
Source: Commission on Elections

==== Lanao del Sur's 4th district ====
Candidate	Party	Votes	%
Lampa Pandi	United Bangsamoro Justice Party	38,505	50.48
Odin Sumagayan	Serbisyong Inklusibo–Alyansang Progresibo	37,707	49.44
Camal Abdul	Progresibong Bangsamoro Party	55	0.07
Johari Comadug	Independent	8	0.01
Total		76,275	100.00
Source: Commission on Elections

==== Lanao del Sur's 5th district ====
Candidate	Party	Votes	%
Arimao Asum	Serbisyong Inklusibo–Alyansang Progresibo	43,761	58.24
Khaledyassin Papandayan	United Bangsamoro Justice Party	30,128	40.10
Udtog Tago	Independent	1,244	1.66
Total		75,133	100.00
Source: Commission on Elections

==== Lanao del Sur's 6th district ====
Candidate	Party	Votes	%
Hosni Macapodi	Serbisyong Inklusibo–Alyansang Progresibo	33,983	55.66
Jimmy Balt	United Bangsamoro Justice Party	27,073	44.34
Total		61,056	100.00
Source: Commission on Elections

==== Lanao del Sur's 7th district ====
Candidate	Party	Votes	%
Rayyan Mindalano	Serbisyong Inklusibo–Alyansang Progresibo	38,670	63.63
Nora Dipatuan	United Bangsamoro Justice Party	21,996	36.19
Palao Sarangani	Independent	74	0.12
Cardawi Macasilang	Independent	31	0.05
Total		60,771	100.00
Source: Commission on Elections

==== Lanao del Sur's 8th district ====
Candidate	Party	Votes	%
Arrie Balindong	United Bangsamoro Justice Party	74,193	100.00
Total		74,193	100.00
Source: Commission on Elections

==== Lanao del Sur's 9th district ====
Candidate	Party	Votes	%
Rashdi Adiong	Serbisyong Inklusibo–Alyansang Progresibo	35,362	76.88
Anwar Galo-Lamping	United Bangsamoro Justice Party	6,432	13.98
Jalal Bayabao	Bangsamoro Party	4,200	9.13
Total		45,994	100.00
Source: Commission on Elections

=== Maguindanao del Norte ===
==== Maguindanao del Norte's 1st district ====
Candidate	Party	Votes	%
Prince Khalid Tomawis	Bangsamoro Federalist Party	41,137	69.93
Jimmy Balitok	United Bangsamoro Justice Party	17,691	30.07
Total		58,828	100.00
Source: Commission on Elections

==== Maguindanao del Norte's 2nd district ====
Candidate	Party	Votes	%
Ibrahim Ibay	Bangsamoro Federalist Party	43,737	100.00
Total		43,737	100.00
Source: Commission on Elections

==== Maguindanao del Norte's 3rd district ====
Candidate	Party	Votes	%
Abdulraof Macacua	Bangsamoro Federalist Party	37,483	79.27
Badrudin Mamad	Independent	9,801	20.73
Total		47,284	100.00
Source: Commission on Elections

==== Maguindanao del Norte's 4th district ====
Candidate	Party	Votes	%
Abdulnasser Abas	United Bangsamoro Justice Party	49,965	57.09
Bai Sandra Sema	Bangsamoro Party	35,603	40.68
Alexander Agustin	BEST Party	1,578	1.80
Jashriya Dilangalen	Independent	367	0.42
Total		87,513	100.00
Source: Commission on Elections

==== Maguindanao del Norte's 5th district ====
Candidate	Party	Votes	%
Ishak Mastura	Bangsamoro Federalist Party	35,963	100.00
Total		35,963	100.00
Source: Commission on Elections

=== Maguindanao del Sur ===
==== Maguindanao del Sur's 1st district ====
Candidate	Party	Votes	%
Tawakal Midtimbang	United Bangsamoro Justice Party	62,302	85.55
Bobby Midtimbang	Al Ittihad–UKB Party	9,697	13.31
Edres Kasim	Independent	433	0.59
Mohammad Hassan Usop	BEST Party	396	0.54
Total		72,828	100.00
Source: Commission on Elections

==== Maguindanao del Sur's 2nd district ====
Candidate	Party	Votes	%
Sajid Andre Ampatuan	Bangsamoro Federalist Party	41,253	63.26
Saad Sindatok	United Bangsamoro Justice Party	23,958	36.74
Total		65,211	100.00
Source: Commission on Elections

==== Maguindanao del Sur's 3rd district ====
Candidate	Party	Votes	%
Ali Sangki	Al Ittihad–UKB Party	64,887	78.17
Basco Camendan	United Bangsamoro Justice Party	11,432	13.77
Daud Upam	Bangsamoro Federalist Party	3,948	4.76
Tasmi Datumanong	Independent	1,896	2.28
Datu Edo Upam	Bangsamoro Party	843	1.02
Total		83,006	100.00
Source: Commission on Elections

==== Maguindanao del Sur's 4th district ====
Candidate	Party	Votes	%
DJ Parok Mangudadatu	Bangsamoro Federalist Party	64,054	94.24
Aladen Delna	Bangsamoro Party	3,914	5.76
Total		67,968	100.00
Source: Commission on Elections

==== Maguindanao del Sur's 5th district ====
Candidate	Party	Votes	%
Rafsanjani Ali	Bangsamoro Federalist Party	66,477	63.14
Anwar Alamada	United Bangsamoro Justice Party	38,459	36.53
Nasser Dalgan	Bangsamoro Party	342	0.32
Total		105,278	100.00
Source: Commission on Elections

=== Special Geographic Area ===
==== Special Geographic Area's 1st district ====
Candidate	Party	Votes	%
Mansor Ebrahim	United Bangsamoro Justice Party	29,061	62.57
Butch Malang	Bangsamoro Federalist Party	17,386	37.43
Total		46,447	100.00
Source: Commission on Elections

==== Special Geographic Area's 2nd district ====
Candidate	Party	Votes	%
Elaysa Enalang	United Bangsamoro Justice Party	20,954	37.03
Kadil Sinolinding Jr.	Independent	20,199	35.70
Dulia Sultan	Bangsamoro Federalist Party	13,662	24.14
Allanuddin Hassan	Independent	1,749	3.09
Kenindia Sinagandal	Independent	20	0.04
Total		56,584	100.00
Source: Commission on Elections

=== Tawi-Tawi ===
==== Tawi-Tawi's 1st district ====
Candidate	Party	Votes	%
Julbert Que	Bangsamoro Federalist Party	54,496	95.30
Indah Sabal	United Bangsamoro Justice Party	2,687	4.70
Total		57,183	100.00
Source: Commission on Elections

==== Tawi-Tawi's 2nd district ====
Candidate	Party	Votes	%
Hadjimar Matba	Progresibong Bangsamoro Party	38,545	69.41
Gamal Hayudini	BARMM Grand Coalition	14,255	25.67
Aziz Halun	United Bangsamoro Justice Party	2,732	4.92
Total		55,532	100.00
Source: Commission on Elections

==== Tawi-Tawi's 3rd district ====
Candidate	Party	Votes	%
Tina Matolo	Bangsamoro Federalist Party	31,418	71.01
Mali Albrinji	BARMM Grand Coalition	8,684	19.63
Alnahada Dalagan	Bangsamoro Party	2,360	5.33
Dayang Amilbangsa	United Bangsamoro Justice Party	1,783	4.03
Total		44,245	100.00
Source: Commission on Elections

==== Tawi-Tawi's 4th district ====
Candidate	Party	Votes	%
Nur-Mahadil Ahaja	Bangsamoro Federalist Party	19,174	36.20
Michail Ahaja	Independent	16,796	31.71
Sanya Jamalul	Independent	16,044	30.29
Dhan Kasim	United Bangsamoro Justice Party	946	1.79
Total		52,960	100.00
Source: Commission on Elections

== Sectoral representation ==
=== Summary ===
Party	Votes	%	Seats
United Bangsamoro Justice Party	4,222,422	43.79	6
BARMM Grand Coalition	2,725,724	28.27	0
Bangsamoro Federalist Party	2,011,045	20.86	0
Iranun Sultanate's League of the Philippines	224,459	2.33	0
Christians Settler for Peace	113,363	1.18	0
Tawi-Tawi Provincial Women's Council	106,142	1.10	0
Royal House of the Sultanate of Marawi	94,125	0.98	0
Dungon Traditional Leaders Organization	58,878	0.61	0
Royal House of the Sultanate of Pagayawan	29,041	0.30	0
Bangsamoro Party	22,919	0.24	0
Datu sa Kabuntalan (Matampay) sa Magindanaw Royal Descendants Association	11,045	0.11	0
League of Bangsamoro Islamic Advocate Associate	9,249	0.10	0
Royal Sultanate of Langkong	7,082	0.07	0
Royal Sultanate of Eastern Unayan	6,841	0.07	0
Non-Moro Indigenous Peoples seats			2
Total	9,642,335	100.00	8
Total votes	2,018,478	–	
Registered voters/turnout	2,393,202	84.34	
Source: Commission on Elections, Philippine News Agency

=== Settler communities ===
==== Summary ====
Candidate	Party	Votes	%
Yul Adelfo Olaya	United Bangsamoro Justice Party	752,919	25.25
Mary Ann Arnado	United Bangsamoro Justice Party	692,771	23.23
Ongpin Yu Ekey	Bangsamoro Federalist Party	406,444	13.63
Susana Anayatin	Bangsamoro Federalist Party	397,839	13.34
Alex Abujen Jr.	BARMM Grand Coalition	348,428	11.68
Arnold Padayahag	BARMM Grand Coalition	270,278	9.06
Edgardo Ramirez	Christians Settler for Peace	88,319	2.96
Percival Lagman	Christians Settler for Peace	25,044	0.84
Total		2,982,042	100.00
Total votes		2,018,478	–
Registered voters/turnout		2,393,202	84.34
Source: Commission on Elections, Philippine News Agency

==== By province and city ====
Province/City	Olaya		Arnado		Yu Ekey		Anayatin		Abujen		Padayahag		Others	
Province/City	Votes	%	Votes	%	Votes	%	Votes	%	Votes	%	Votes	%	Votes	%
Basilan	49,229	17.52	40,413	14.38	44,572	15.86	43,167	15.36	60,348	21.47	37,906	13.49	5,382	1.91
Cotabato City	28,187	23.88	27,768	23.52	26,229	22.22	27,749	23.50	1,388	1.18	2,639	2.24	4,100	3.48
Lanao del Sur	292,076	29.92	254,541	26.07	63,463	6.50	25,062	2.57	174,029	17.83	131,060	13.42	36,075	3.69
Maguindanao del Norte	112,953	21.82	119,339	23.05	125,941	24.33	126,966	24.53	12,108	2.34	10,252	1.98	10,083	1.95
Maguindanao del Sur	172,471	26.99	150,444	23.54	55,188	8.64	76,583	11.99	69,659	10.90	63,903	10.00	50,718	7.94
Special Geographic Area	78,857	46.68	71,831	42.53	6,935	4.11	8,527	5.05	1,087	0.64	560	0.33	1,116	0.66
Tawi-Tawi	19,146	6.81	28,435	10.11	84,116	29.92	89,785	31.94	29,809	10.60	23,958	8.52	5,889	2.09
Total	752,919	25.25	692,771	23.23	406,444	13.63	397,839	13.34	348,428	11.68	270,278	9.06	113,363	3.80
Source: Commission on Elections

=== Traditional leaders ===
==== Summary ====
Candidate	Party	Votes	%
Marjanie Macasalong	United Bangsamoro Justice Party	718,004	41.19
Pax Mangudadatu	BARMM Grand Coalition	439,066	25.19
Panga Ibay	Iranun Sultanate's League of the Philippines	224,459	12.88
Datuteng Gumbila	Bangsamoro Federalist Party	154,782	8.88
Abdul Hamidullah Atar	Royal House of the Sultanate of Marawi	94,125	5.40
Nursharif Maulana	Dungon Traditional Leaders Organization	58,878	3.38
Sailaney Benito	Royal House of the Sultanate of Pagayawan	29,041	1.67
Tharhata Ampatuan	Datu sa Kabuntalan (Matampay) sa Magindanaw Royal Descendants Association	11,045	0.63
Jehad Hadji Nor	Royal Sultanate of Langkong	7,082	0.41
Mangontawar Amatonding	Royal Sultanate of Eastern Unayan	6,841	0.39
Total		1,743,323	100.00
Valid votes		1,743,323	86.37
Invalid/blank votes		275,155	13.63
Total votes		2,018,478	100.00
Registered voters/turnout		2,393,202	84.34
Source: Commission on Elections, Philippine News Agency

==== By province and city ====
Province/City	Macasalong		Mangudadatu		Ibay		Gumbila		Others	
Province/City	Votes	%	Votes	%	Votes	%	Votes	%	Votes	%
Basilan	41,471	25.11	75,653	45.80	19,189	11.62	19,476	11.79	9,394	5.68
Cotabato City	31,561	48.02	6,914	10.52	2,910	4.43	21,593	32.85	2,748	4.19
Lanao del Sur	320,454	53.91	133,689	22.49	15,111	2.54	4,276	0.72	120,921	20.35
Maguindanao del Norte	103,896	36.90	35,642	12.66	93,827	33.33	41,885	14.88	6,298	2.24
Maguindanao del Sur	132,683	35.32	153,981	40.99	50,853	13.54	32,830	8.74	5,331	1.42
Special Geographic Area	77,647	85.74	1,806	1.99	1,542	1.70	7,485	8.27	2,082	2.30
Tawi-Tawi	10,292	6.05	31,381	18.44	41,027	24.11	27,237	16.01	60,238 (Note: Includes 52,402 votes for Nursharif Maulana, the candidate with the most number of votes in Tawi-Tawi.)	35.39
Total	718,004	41.19	439,066	25.19	224,459	12.88	154,782	8.88	207,012	11.88
Source: Commission on Elections

=== Women ===
==== Summary ====
Candidate	Party	Votes	%
Aida Silongan	United Bangsamoro Justice Party	727,554	42.95
Ruby Sahali	BARMM Grand Coalition	515,270	30.41
Jehan Usop	Bangsamoro Federalist Party	313,012	18.48
Dayangcarlsum Jumaide	Tawi-Tawi Provincial Women's Council	106,142	6.27
Pombaen Kader	Bangsamoro Party	22,919	1.35
Mariam Kadatuan	League of Bangsamoro Islamic Advocate Associate	9,249	0.55
Total		1,694,146	100.00
Valid votes		1,694,146	83.93
Invalid/blank votes		324,332	16.07
Total votes		2,018,478	100.00
Registered voters/turnout		2,393,202	84.34
Source: Commission on Elections, Philippine News Agency

==== By province and city ====
Province/City	Silongan		Sahali		Usop		Others	
Province/City	Votes	%	Votes	%	Votes	%	Votes	%
Basilan	40,872	24.99	75,671	46.27	25,683	15.71	21,307	13.03
Cotabato City	33,784	52.48	2,144	3.33	24,020	37.31	4,423	6.87
Lanao del Sur	263,062	47.68	226,390	41.04	34,521	6.26	27,704	5.02
Maguindanao del Norte	125,105	45.83	15,291	5.60	113,153	41.46	19,398	7.11
Maguindanao del Sur	181,107	51.62	84,145	23.98	73,792	21.03	11,822	3.37
Special Geographic Area	80,834	86.56	813	0.87	9,160	9.81	2,573	2.76
Tawi-Tawi	2,790	1.41	110,816	56.15	32,683	16.56	51,083	25.88
Total	727,554	42.95	515,270	30.41	313,012	18.48	138,310	8.17
Source: Commission on Elections

=== Ulama ===
==== Summary ====
Candidate	Party	Votes	%
Muhammad Nadzir Ebil	United Bangsamoro Justice Party	679,905	42.04
Alibasher Abdullatif	BARMM Grand Coalition	551,525	34.11
Marhan Borhan	Bangsamoro Federalist Party	385,670	23.85
Total		1,617,100	100.00
Valid votes		1,617,100	80.11
Invalid/blank votes		401,378	19.89
Total votes		2,018,478	100.00
Registered voters/turnout		2,393,202	84.34
Source: Commission on Elections, Philippine News Agency

==== By province and city ====
Province/City	Ebil		Abdullatif		Borhan	
Province/City	Votes	%	Votes	%	Votes	%
Basilan	57,169	38.63	45,385	30.67	45,443	30.71
Cotabato City	35,078	55.06	1,918	3.01	26,712	41.93
Lanao del Sur	177,491	32.03	356,920	64.42	19,647	3.55
Maguindanao del Norte	123,014	45.59	31,931	11.83	114,907	42.58
Maguindanao del Sur	187,876	55.02	81,658	23.91	71,955	21.07
Special Geographic Area	80,770	89.37	882	0.98	8,730	9.66
Tawi-Tawi	18,507	12.37	32,831	21.94	98,276	65.69
Total	679,905	42.04	551,525	34.11	385,670	23.85
Source: Commission on Elections

=== Youth ===
==== Summary ====
Candidate	Party	Votes	%
Sulfry Abbas	United Bangsamoro Justice Party	651,269	40.56
Jeff Adiong	BARMM Grand Coalition	601,157	37.44
Nur-Jamil Ibrahim	Bangsamoro Federalist Party	353,298	22.00
Total		1,605,724	100.00
Valid votes		1,605,724	79.55
Invalid/blank votes		412,754	20.45
Total votes		2,018,478	100.00
Registered voters/turnout		2,393,202	84.34
Source: Commission on Elections, Philippine News Agency

==== By province and city ====
Province/City	Abbas		Adiong		Ibrahim	
Province/City	Votes	%	Votes	%	Votes	%
Basilan	43,153	29.08	60,929	41.05	44,327	29.87
Cotabato City	36,228	56.31	2,004	3.12	26,100	40.57
Lanao del Sur	182,365	32.97	352,221	63.67	18,573	3.36
Maguindanao del Norte	121,976	45.30	33,868	12.58	113,396	42.12
Maguindanao del Sur	175,007	53.33	72,849	22.20	80,284	24.47
Special Geographic Area	77,200	88.15	648	0.74	9,731	11.11
Tawi-Tawi	15,340	9.91	78,638	50.78	60,887	39.32
Total	651,269	40.56	601,157	37.44	353,298	22.00
Source: Commission on Elections

=== Non-Moro Indigenous Peoples ===
The two Non-Moro Indigenous Peoples representatives were selected during the Regional Inter-Tribal Convention at the Pagana Convention Center that was held in Cotabato City on August 26, 2026.

==== Nominees ====
The following nominees were selected:

Group	Name
Blaan	No nominees
Dulangan Manobo	Datu Noel Lumagan
Dulangan Manobo	Booy Myra Mengkay
Erumanen ne Menuvu	Jennena Arba
Erumanen ne Menuvu	Pobre Rady Boy
Lambiangan	Tessie Ambol
Lambiangan	Leticio Datuwata
Limbubungan Higaonon	Samsoding Capal
Limbubungan Higaonon	Carylle Vee Kalaw
Teduray	Joe Ganna Jover
Teduray	Ludivico Marcelino Jr.

==== Alternates ====
The following alternates were selected:

Group	Name
Blaan	No alternates
Dulangan Manobo	No alternates
Erumanen ne Menuvu	Lera Mandadtem
Erumanen ne Menuvu	Leonardo Pangundas
Lambiangan	Linda Mical
Lambiangan	Nonie Uca
Limbubungan Higaonon	Jhoel Alingasa
Limbubungan Higaonon	Barbara Maque
Teduray	Ella Sheryl Benito
Teduray	Ernesto Mokudef

==== Elected representatives ====
Name	Group
Leticio Datuwata	Lambiangan
Joe Ganna Jover	Teduray

It was also agreed at the Regional Inter-Tribal Convention that the Non-Moro Indigenous Peoples representatives are to be selected according to the following cycle:

1. Lambiangan and Teduray
2. Erumanen ne Menuvu and Dulangan Manobo
3. Blaan and Higaonon
