= Emblem of Bangsamoro =

Versions
- Arabic Version
- Armiger: Bangsamoro Autonomous Region in Muslim Mindanao
- Adopted: September 6, 2019

The Emblem of Bangsamoro is the official insignia of the Bangsamoro Autonomous Region in Muslim Mindanao, an autonomous region in the Philippines.

== History ==
Under the Bangsamoro Organic Law, the charter of the Bangsamoro Autonomous Region in Muslim Mindanao (BARMM) which succeeded the Autonomous Region in Muslim Mindanao (ARMM) is entitled to have its own regional flag and emblem.

The Bangsamoro Parliament passed Parliament Bill No. 8 which is also known as "An Act Adopting an Official Seal of the Bangsamoro Autonomous Region in Muslim Mindanao". The measure was passed on its third and final reading on August 29, 2019 and was signed into law on September 6, 2019 by Chief Minister Murad Ebrahim as Bangsamoro Autonomy Act No. 2.

== Design ==
The design of the Seal as approved by the Bangsamoro Parliament consists of a circular green field featuring a yellow crescent containing a seven-pointed star. The seal is encircled by a rope motif and a thin red inner fimbriation. The rope signifies the unity of the region's ethnic groups, and the red strip represents the blood of the mujahidīn who fought for the self determination while the crescent stands for the "guiding principles" of the region's people who fought for this. The inclusion of the rope was inspired from the Surah 3:103 of the Quran, which states "Hold tight to the rope of Allah, together. And be not divided".

The seven-pointed star represents the component local governments of the region: the provinces of Basilan, Lanao del Sur, Maguindanao, Sulu and Tawi Tawi, Cotabato City, and exclave barangays in Cotabato. The seal contains the full name of the Bangsamoro region in English.

A co-official variant of the seal is in Arabic with the foundation year indicated using the Hijri Calendar (1440 AH).

== See also ==
- Flag of the Autonomous Region in Muslim Mindanao
- Flag of Bangsamoro
- Hymn of Bangsamoro
- Seal of the Autonomous Region in Muslim Mindanao
