= Christians Settler for Peace =

- Bangsamoro Parliament: 0 / 80

The Christians Settler for Peace (C4P) is an organization advocating for the Christian-majority settler communities of the Bangsamoro autonomous region in the Philippines.

== History ==
=== Formation ===
The Christians for Peace (C4P) movement originated back in 2018, which advocates for representation of Christian-majority settler communities in the Bangsamoro autonomous region which supplanted the Autonomous Region in Muslim Mindanao (ARMM) the following year. They are seeking to help the settlers be represented in the politics of the Muslim-majority Bangsamoro region.

The C4P movement which presented the 17-point peace agenda to the Moro Islamic Liberation Front was represented by various Roman Catholic, Protestant, and secular organizations such as the Archdiocese of Cotabato, Evangelical Churches in the Philippines, the Episcopal Church, Prelature of Marawi, Prelature of Isabela de Basilan, the local government of Upi, Radio Mindanao Network Cotabato, the Office of the Deputy Governor for Christian Affairs, and the United Nations Development Programme.

=== 2026 Bangsamoro elections ===
As the Christians Settlers for Peace, the organization has entered as a political party for the 2026 Bangsamoro Parliament election. They are seeking to win the reserved seat for the settler communities. Their candidates are Edgardo Ramirez, and Lagman Percival. The latter is an evangelical pastor.
