= Bangsamoro Hymn =

- Regional Anthem of Bangsamoro
- Published: January 30, 2020
- Adopted: February 13, 2020

Audio sample
- Official digital orchestral instrumental rendition: file; help

The Bangsamoro Hymn is the regional hymn of the Bangsamoro Autonomous Region in Muslim Mindanao, an autonomous region in the southern Philippines. It was adopted in early 2020.

== Background ==
Under the Bangsamoro Organic Law, the charter of the Bangsamoro Autonomous Region in Muslim Mindanao (BARMM) which succeeded the Autonomous Region in Muslim Mindanao (ARMM) is entitled to have its own regional hymn. Prior to the ratification of the Bangsamoro Organic Law, Bangsamoro having its own regional hymn was contested. Buhay Partylist Representative Lito Atienza said a separate "anthem" for the Bangsamoro region would not encourage national unity, and if the song is similar to the hymns used by other local government units, he insisted that the proposed legislation be explicitly stated as "hymn" rather than "anthem".

In February 2019, the Bangsamoro Transition Authority launched a competition for a new hymn for Bangsamoro, along with design competitions for a new flag and seal of the region.

A proposed legislation to adopt an official regional hymn for Bangsamoro filed before the Bangsamoro Parliament is Parliament Bill No. 2 which is also known as "An Act Adopting the Official Hymn of the Bangsamoro Autonomous Region in Muslim Mindanao (BARMM)". By August 29, 2019, the measure is already on its second reading. Three versions of the hymn in English, Tagalog and Maguindanaon languages has been proposed as per parliament member Romeo Sema, a proponent of the measure. Sema's colleague's has suggested changes to the bill such as adding a designated portion of the hymn sang by a female for gender-inclusiveness and render additional versions of the hymn in every regional language of Bangsamoro.

The Bangsamoro Parliament approved the proposed version of the Bangsamoro Hymn under Cabinet Bill no. 39 on January 30, 2020. The proposed legislation is signed into law on February 13, 2020, by Chief Minister Murad Ebrahim as Bangsamoro Autonomy Act No. 7.

== Lyrics ==
Filipino lyrics

Simula noon hanggang ngayon
Iisa ang naging layon
Magkaisa at magbuklod
Kagitingan ay marubdob

Tumayo tayo mula sa hamon ng nakaraan
Niyapos ang panganib na humahadlang
Pinangako sa puso at paniniwala
Ang ginhawang para sa kabataan

Chorus:
Bangsamoro'y tagumpay
Bunga ng pawis, dugo at buhay
Kapayapaan, Katarungan
Ay atin nang nakamtan
Alhamdulillah, Alhamdulillah
Pagpalain Bangsamoro

Bangsamoro, Bangsamoro
Lagi kang mamahalin
Walang pipigil sa damdamin
Mga pangako'y tutuparin

Habang buhay kami sayo'y magbabantay
Mananatili sa puso't isipan
Ang kahapong humimlay na nagbuwis ng buhay
Nasa piling na ng Maykapal

Chorus

External videos
- The Official Hymn of the Bangsamoro Autonomous Region in Muslim Mindanao

== Usage ==
The hymn is to be performed during flag-raising ceremonies which involve the Bangsamoro flag. The singing of the Bangsamoro Hymn is mandated by law, particularly the Bangsamoro Organic Law, to be sung after the Philippine national anthem. Bangsamoro Autonomy Act No. 7 also allows for a version of the hymn in Arabic, Filipino or any other indigenous Bangsamoro languages to be officially adopted with approval of the Chief Minister.

== See also ==
- Flag of Bangsamoro
- Seal of Bangsamoro
