= BEST Party (Bangsamoro) =

- President: Al-Rashid Balt
- House of Representatives: 0 / 8 (Bangsamoro seats only)
- Provincial governors: 0 / 6 (Bangsamoro only)
- Provincial vice governors: 0 / 6 (Bangsamoro only)
- Provincial board members: 0 / 46 (Bangsamoro regular seats only)
- Bangsamoro Parliament: 0 / 80

The Bangsamoro Empowerment and Social Transformation (BEST) Party is a regional political party in the Bangsamoro of the Philippines.

== Background ==
The Bangsamoro Empowerment and Social Transformation (BEST) Party was formed in 2025. It was formed from members of other aspirant parties for the Bangsamoro Parliament election which has been postponed multiple times. This includes the Advocates for Settler Communities Party and the Moro Party

BEST received accreditation as a regional political party from the Commission on Elections to take part in the September 2026 Bangsmoro election.

BEST claims to be the representative party for Bangsamoro's "Tri-People" with its 40 percent of its nominees being Moro, 30 percent being from the settler communities, and 20 percent coming from the Lumads. Almost half of its nominees are women.
