= Jo Genna Jover =

Filipino indigenous rights advocate

Member of the Bangsamoro Parliament for the Non-Moro Indigenous Peoples sector
- Incumbent
- Assumed office October 30, 2026
- Preceded by: Office established
Ministerial offices
Minister of Indigenous Peoples' Affairs
Incumbent
Assumed office November 5, 2026
Chief Minister	Abdulraof Macacua
Preceded by	Guiamal Abdulrahman
Succeeded by

Personal details
- Born: Jo Genna Martin Jover

Jo Genna "Jude" Martin Jover is a Filipino indigenous rights and peace advocate who is a member of the Bangsamoro Parliament since October 30, 2026 representing the Non-Moro Indigenous Peoples.

== Career ==
=== IP rights and peace process ===
Jo Genna Jover is known for advocating for the greater awareness on indigenous rights and fought against intrusion on ancestral lands. She also promoted dialogue and greater relations between the Moro and Lumad communities. She is a member of the Kutawato Council for Justice and Peace. In 2015, the N-Peace Awards recognized her advocacy.

=== Bangsamoro Parliament ===
At the regional inter-tribal convention in Cotabato City on August 25, 2026, Jover representing the Tedurays was selected as one of the two representatives of the Non-Moro Indigenous Peoples in the upcoming 1st Bangsamoro Parliament

Chief Minister Abdulraof Macacua on November 5, 2026, announced her appointment as the head of the Ministry of Indigenous Peoples' Affairs.

== Personal life ==
Jover is a Teduray woman who hails from South Upi. She initially pursued a nursing career before committing to advocacy. She is a holder of a sociology degree.

Jover she got involved in the advocacy after seeing her mother, who was a teacher, experienced discrimination in employment. Her mother was also an advocate promoting the importance of education for young Teduray girls.
