= Flag of Bangsamoro =

Bangsamoro
- Use: Civil and state flag
- Proportion: 6:11
- Adopted: August 28, 2019; 7 years ago
- Design: A horizontal tricolor of green, white and red with the yellow seven-pointed star surrounded by a yellow crescent both centered on the white band and a white kris centered on the red band.
- Official regional emblem for vertical display
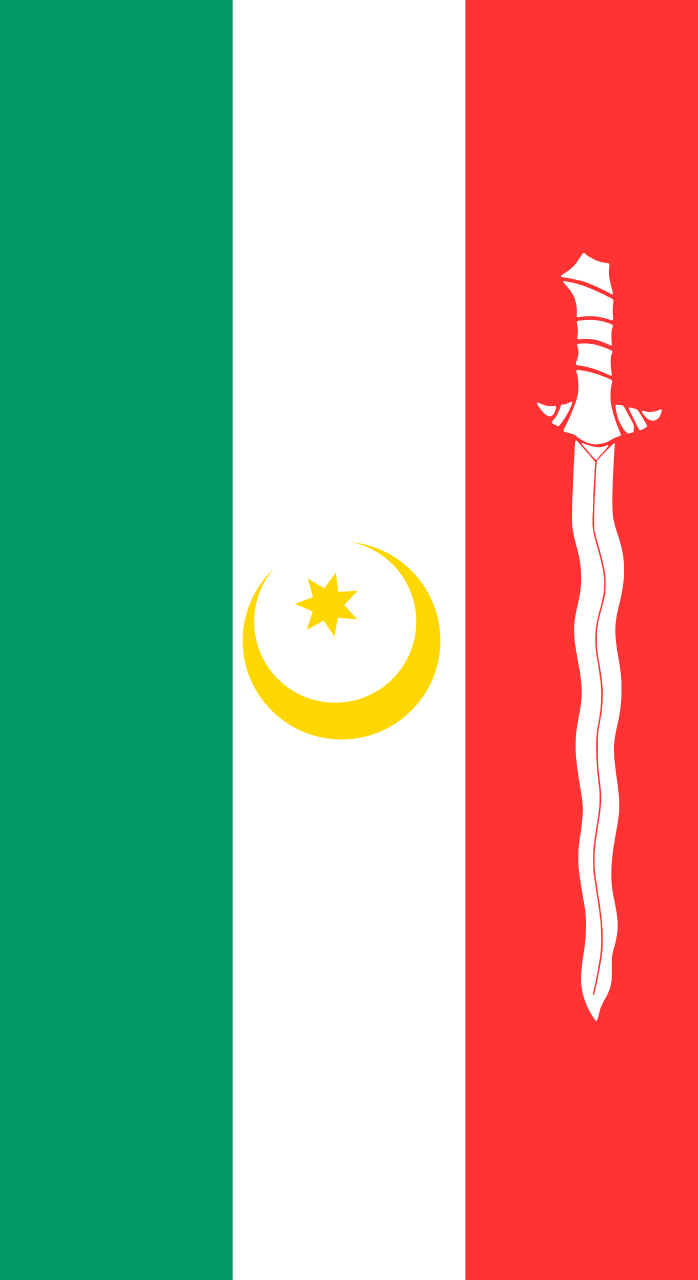

The flag of the Bangsamoro Autonomous Region in Muslim Mindanao, an autonomous region of the Philippines, is a horizontal tricolor of green, white and red with the yellow seven-pointed star surrounded by a yellow crescent both centered on the white band and a white kris centered on the red band. It was adopted in 2019.

== History ==
Under the Bangsamoro Organic Law, the charter of the Bangsamoro Autonomous Region in Muslim Mindanao (BARMM) which succeeded the Autonomous Region in Muslim Mindanao (ARMM) is entitled to have its own regional flag and emblem. The ARMM also had its own flag.

Prior to the ratification of the Bangsamoro Organic Law, there was opposition to then proposed Bangsamoro region to having its own flag. The Philippine Constitution Association and Buhay Partylist Representative Lito Atienza argued that a separate flag for the Bangsamoro region is unconstitutional. Atienza says that a separate flag for the region would hinder national unity. The Office of the Presidential Adviser on the Peace Process has pointed out that the Bangsamoro region as an entity under the Philippine national government is authorized to have its own flag under the Flag and Heraldic Code (Republic Act No. 8491).

In February 2019, the Bangsamoro Transition Authority launched a design competition for a new flag for Bangsamoro, along with competitions for a new hymn and seal of the region. The Bangsamoro Cabinet selected among the submissions a design for the flag. Equal representation of Bangsamoro's ethnic groups and tribes were a priority in flag adoption process.

The Bangsamoro Parliament passed Parliament Bill No. 7 which is also known as "An Act Adopting an Official Flag of the Bangsamoro Autonomous Region in Muslim Mindanao". The measure was passed on its third and final reading on August 22, 2019 and was signed into law on August 28, 2019 by Chief Minister Murad Ebrahim as Bangsamoro Autonomy Act No. 1. On the same day, the flag was officially hoisted in front of the BARMM Executive Building.

Provisionally, the flag of the former Autonomous Region in Muslim Mindanao had been used to represent the region prior to the adoption of the current flag.

== Design ==
The approved design for the Bangsamoro regional flag as per Bangsamoro Autonomy Act No. 1 is a green, white, and red horizontal tricolor of equal height with a golden yellow crescent and seven-pointed star as well as a white kris.

The flag's standard dimensions is at 3 by 5.5 feet (0.91 m × 1.68 m), or with an aspect ratio of 6:11. The flag's four colors are defined by law according to their HEX values.

The green symbolizes the majority Muslim population of the region, white represents purity, and red represents the Bangsamoro struggle.

The crescent represents the "principles which guided the Bangsamoro who struggled for self-determination" and the seven points of the star represents the component local governments of the region at the time of its creation in 2019; the provinces of Basilan, Lanao del Sur, Maguindanao (now divided into Maguindanao del Norte and Maguindanao del Sur in 2022), Sulu (formerly part of the region until 2024) and Tawi Tawi, Cotabato City and the 63 barangays in Cotabato which are part of Bangsamoro. The golden yellow of both elements situated in the center of the flag's white section signifies "bright future" for the region.

The kris is to be displayed in the center of the bottom red portion of the flag. The width of the sword is 60 percent of the flag's width. It signifies the region's protection and resistance against "tyranny, oppression, and injustice".

Scheme	Green	White	Red	Yellow
HEX	#009966	#FFFFFF	#FF3333	#FFD700
RGB	0-153-102	255-255-255	255-51-51	255-15-0
CMYK	C100-M0-Y33-K40	C0-M0-Y0-K0	C0-M80-Y80-K0	C0-M16-Y100-K0

== Usage ==
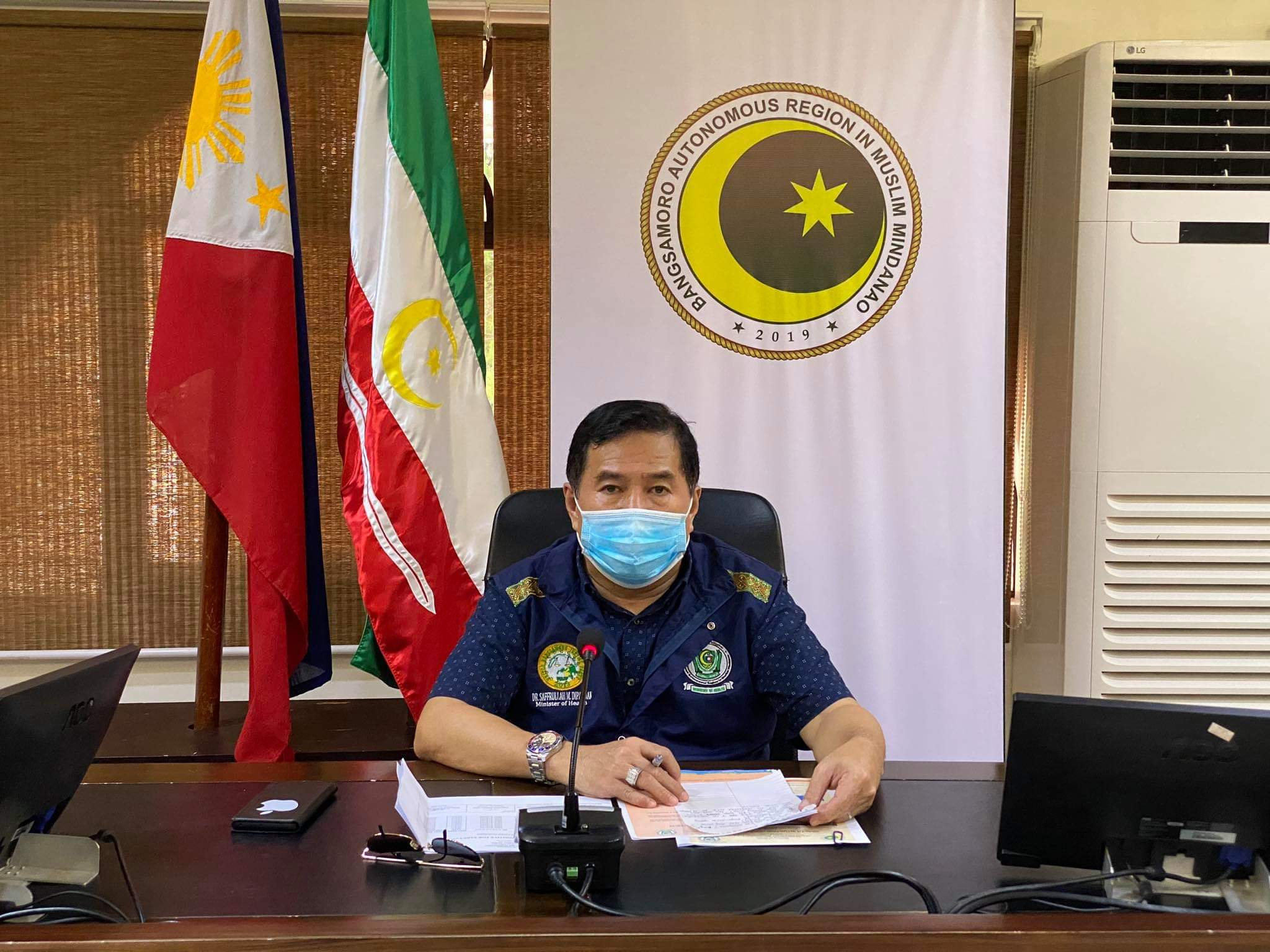
The law mandates that the Bangsamoro flag (right) should be always be displayed alongside the Philippine national flag (left).

Under the Bangsamoro Organic Law, the Bangsamoro regional flag should be displayed alongside the Philippine national flag.

As per law all public offices, schools, colleges, and universities, government-owned and controlled corporations and other government bodies under the Bangsamoro region are mandated to display the Bangsamoro flag. The flag could also be used in ceremonial and symbolic activities when necessary.

== See also ==
- Flag of the Autonomous Region in Muslim Mindanao
- Hymn of Bangsamoro
- Seal of Bangsamoro
- Seal of the Autonomous Region in Muslim Mindanao
