= Bangsamoro Youth Model Parliamentarian Association =

Youth organization in the Bangsamoro region in the Philippines

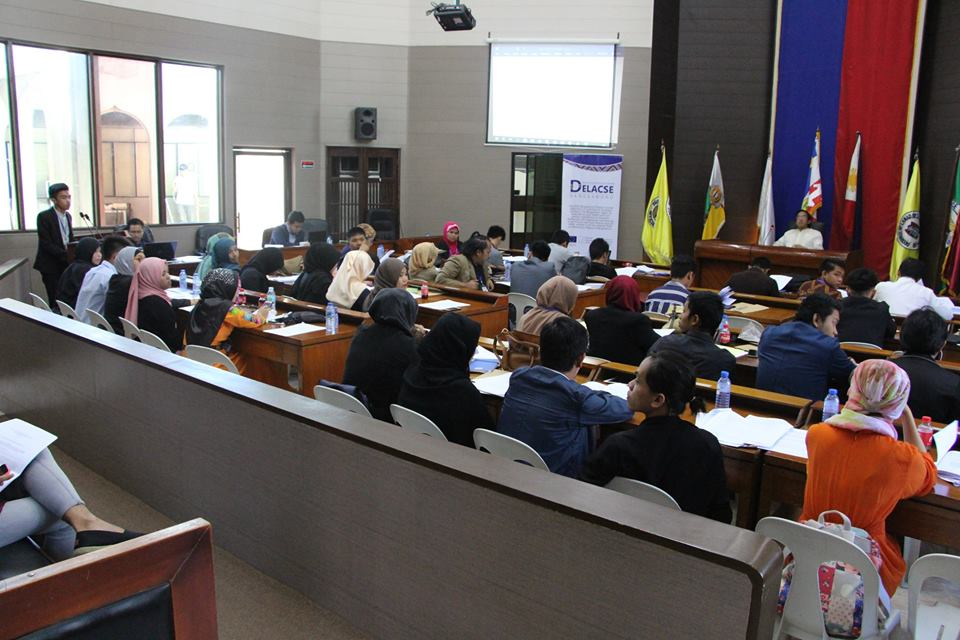
BYMPA on crafting bills for the Bangsamoro Autonomous Region.

Bangsamoro Youth Model Parliamentarian Association (also BYMPA), is a youth organization composed of youth leaders from the different religions and tribes in the Bangsamoro Autonomous Region in the Philippines, simulating parliamentary proceedings of a legislature or other deliberative assembly. It was formed on September 21, 2018 the same time they proposed bills through the office of Regional Legislative Assembly – Autonomous Region in Muslim Mindanao led by the Office of the Presidential Advisers on the Peace Process. The organization was established during the three-day summit "MasterPeace: Bangsamoro Youth Model Parliament" to build a culture of peace in the Bangsamoro region in discussing critical issues for a peace-building community as they crafted and deliberated on proposed bills for the Bangsamoro Autonomous Region in Muslim Mindanao, co-organized by the Democratic Leadership and Active Civil Society Empowerment (DELACSE) Bangsamoro, a European Union-funded project implemented by Konrad-Adenauer-Stiftung Philippines, and the Institute for Autonomy and Governance.

== Bangsamoro Transition ==
On June 19, 2019, BYMPA joined the policy making during the transition of Bangsamoro Autonomous Region in crafting of five-point youth peace and security agenda.

== See also ==
- Bangsamoro Parliament
