= Sangguniang Bayan =

Municipal legislature in Philippine municipalities

The Sangguniang Bayan (lit. 'municipal council') is the local legislative branch of the municipal governments in the Philippines. It is responsible for passing ordinances and resolutions for the administration of a municipality. Its powers are defined by the Local Government Code, passed by Congress in 1991.

The Sangguniang Bayan is a form of the mayor–council government, via the "strong mayor" variant.

== Composition ==
=== Presiding officer ===
The municipal vice mayor is the ex officio presiding officer of the Sangguniang Bayan, although they have no voting privileges except in the case of a deadlock. In the absence of the vice mayor, a temporary presiding officer is elected by the Sangguniang Bayan members present at the session.

=== Members ===
All municipalities in the Philippines, with the exception of Pateros in Metro Manila, have eight regular members or councilors elected at-large. In the case of Pateros, its Sangguniang Bayan is composed of twelve elected councilors, wherein six are elected from each of the two districts Pateros is divided into.

There are also two ex officio councilors – the municipal chapter presidents of the Liga ng mga Barangay and the Pederasyon ng Sangguniang Kabataan and some municipalities have a reserved seat for the IP Representative which is pursuant to the Republic Act 8371, or the Indigenous Peoples (IP) Rights Act of 1997, that calls for a Indigenous Peoples Mandatory Representative and it is formally certified by the concerned NCIP regional director, upon recommendation of the provincial or community service center head and shall serve for a period of three years from the date of assumption to office and can be re-endorsed for another term. Members may not serve for more than three consecutive terms.

The Local Government Code of 1991 provides for an additional three sectoral representatives representing: women, laborers, and any of the urban poor, indigenous cultural communities, disabled persons or another sector that may be identified by the Sangguniang Bayan; however, this provision still has to be implemented.

== Qualifications, election, and term ==
According to Section 39(d) of Republic Act 7160, elected or regular members of the Sangguniang Bayan must at least be 18 years old on election day. Multi-member plurality voting is used to elect these members, in which voters may vote for as many candidates as the number of council seats. As stipulated in Section 43 of the same republic act, they are elected for a three-year term and may serve up to three consecutive terms. Elections are held simultaneously with the general elections held every three years since 1992. The term begins at noon of June 30 following election day, and ends at noon of June 30 of the third year.

For the ex officio members, the term starts after their election of the municipal chapter of the organization (Sangguniang Kabataan or Liga ng mga Barangay), and ends on when their term as officer ends; barangay elections have been held irregularly, but are usually held every three years.

For the IP representative, the term starts after their election, and ends three years thereafter. Members cannot be elected for three consecutive terms. Similar to other local officials in the Philippines, recall elections may be initiated by at least 25 percent of registered voters in the municipality against any regular Sangguniang Bayan member should they lose confidence with any of them.

=== Vacancy ===
A permanent vacancy among the regular Sagguniang Bayan members is filled in by an appointment of the governor of the province the municipality is a part of. However, such authority to appoint is restricted only to the nominee of the political party to which the member who caused the vacancy belongs; should the member be politically unaffiliated, the Sangguniang Bayan then nominates a qualified individual to fill in the vacant position. Appointees are also limited to serve only the unexpired term.

In the case of vacancies among ex officio members the next ranking official of the Liga ng mga Barangay or Pederasyon ng Sangguniang Kabataan assumes the vacancy.

== Legislation ==
An ordinance passed by the Sangguniang Bayan is sent to the municipal mayor for approval. Once approved, it is transmitted to the Sangguniang Panlalawigan of the province to which the municipality belongs, for compliance review. Since Pateros is not part of any province, any ordinance or measure it adopts is not subjected to any Sangguniang Panlalawigan review.

On the other hand, when the mayor veto an ordinance, it is sent back to the Sangguniang Bayan to reconsider the objections; however the Sangguniang Bayan may override such veto by a two-thirds vote of all its members which renders the measure's approval. With regard to ordinances pertaining to appropriations; or resolutions for payments of money, the adoption of local development plans or public investment programs, or the creation of liabilities, the mayor may just veto particular items in it. Any veto action must be communicated with the Sangguniang Bayan within ten days otherwise the ordinance is considered approved.

The Sangguniang Panlalawigans may declare an ordinance or portions of it invalid should it be found to be inconsistent with existing laws, or it goes beyond the authority the Sangguniang Bayan may actually exercise. But if no action is taken by the Sangguniang Panlalawigan within 30 days, it is presumed to be compliant and deemed valid, and thus takes effect within the concerned town.

== See also ==
- Municipalities of the Philippines
