= Bangsamoro Government Center =

Government center in Cotabato City, Philippines

- Bangsamoro Government Center

- Location within Mindanao mainland Location within Philippines
- Former names: Office of the Bangsamoro People
- Alternative names: BARMM Regional Capitol

General information
- Architectural style: Modern-Islamic architecture
- Location: Cotabato City, BARMM Complex, Rosary Heights VII, Cotabato City, Philippines
- Coordinates: 7°11′49.5″N 124°14′42.5″E
- Current tenants: Chief Minister of Bangsamoro; Bangsamoro Transition Authority
- Completed: 1976
- Renovated: 2014
- Owner: Regional Government of Bangsamoro

Technical details
- Floor count: 2
- Floor area: 1,600 sqm

The Bangsamoro Government Center, also known as the Bangsamoro Office, is a complex of government buildings in Cotabato City, Philippines. The complex serves as the seat of the regional government of the Bangsamoro Autonomous Region in Muslim Mindanao.

== Background ==
The Bangsamoro Government Center complex houses the offices of various instrumentalities of the Bangsamoro Autonomous Region in Muslim Mindanao local government including the Offices of the Wali and the Chief Minister, the Parliament, ministries and other agencies under the Bangsamoro Autonomous Region in Muslim Mindanao. It formerly served as the executive office of Regional Governor of the now-defunct Autonomous Region in Muslim Mindanao. Nicknamed as the "Little Malacañan of the South", it was built in 1976 by then-President Ferdinand Marcos. The building was formerly known as the Office of the Regional Governor (ORG). The building was renamed as the Office of the Bangsamoro People upon the completion of its seven-month renovation on July 30, 2014. The building also includes a 200-square-meter (2,200 sq ft) prayer room.

The Bangsamoro government is set to move out of the Bangsamoro Government Center after the passage of Bangsamoro Autonomy Act No. 37, which moved the seat of government of the region from Cotabato City to Parang in Maguindanao del Norte.

== Complex ==
The Bangsamoro Government Center complex has the following features:

- Executive Building
- Bangsamoro Parliament Building – Meeting place of the Bangsamoro Parliament and former meeting place of the defunct ARMM Regional Legislative Assembly
- Shariff Kabunsuan Cultural Complex – hosts the Bangsamoro Museum
- The Astana - Official Residence of the Chief Minister of the Bangsamoro
