= Non-Moro Indigenous Peoples in the Bangsamoro Parliament =

Non-Moro Indigenous Peoples
- Sectoral representation for the Bangsamoro Parliament
- Peoples represented: Limbubungan Higaonon, Erumanen ne Menuvu, Blaan, Dulangan Manobo, Lambiangan, and Teduray

Current Sectoral representation
- Created: 2026
- Seats: 2
- Members: Leticio Datuwata (Lambiangan); Jo Genna Jover (Teduray)

The Non-Moro Indigenous Peoples sector is a constituency in the Bangsamoro Parliament. The Parliament reserves two seats for indigenous peoples in the Bangsamoro, excluding the region's dominant Moro people.

== Background ==
The Bangsamoro Parliament, as provided for by the Bangsamoro Electoral Code of 2023, is mandated to reserve eight seats for sectoral representatives. These include representatives of the settler communities, women, youth, 'Ulama, traditional leaders, and the Non-Moro Indigenous Peoples (NMIP).

All six sectors were supposed to select their representatives through their respective sectoral assemblies. However, Bangsamoro Act No. 88 was passed amending the Bangsamoro Electoral Code, meaning that all sectors except the NMIP are to elect their representatives through a direct plurality of valid votes.

== History ==
The NMIPs were already represented during the interim period of the Bangsamoro Parliament, which began in February 2019 and is set to end in October 2026. The Teduray had members who served in the interim parliament during this period, namely Melanio Ulama and Romeo Saliga from 2019 to 2022, and Froilyn Mendoza and Ramon Piang since 2022.

The first-ever representatives for the NMIP were selected on August 26, 2026, during the Regional Inter-Tribal Convention at the Pagana Convention Center in Cotabato City. The delegates also decided the order of representation for the six tribes.

== Rotation of groups ==
The rotation order for the NMIP groups, as agreed upon during the 2026 Regional Inter-Tribal Convention on August 26, 2026, is as follows:

No.	Group
1–2	Lambiangan
1–2	Teduray
3–4	Dulangan Manobo
3–4	Erumanen ne Menuvu
5–6	Blaan
5–6	Higaonon

== List of NMIP MPs ==
Seat A				Seat B				Parliament
Portrait	Member (Lifespan)	Term of office	Group	Portrait	Member (Lifespan)	Term of office	Group	Parliament
	Leticio Datuwata	October 30, 2026	Lambiangan		Jo Genna Jover	October 30, 2026	Teduray	1st Parliament

== Regional inter-tribal conventions ==
=== Summary ===
Year	Convention date	Election date	Location	Ref.
2026	August 26	September 14	Pagana Convention Center, Cotabato City	

=== Selection ===
==== 2026 ====
===== Nominees and alternates =====
The following nominees and alternates were selected:

Group	Nominee	Alternate
Blaan	No nominees	No alternates
Dulangan Manobo	Datu Noel Lumagan	No alternates
Dulangan Manobo	Booy Myra Mengkay	No alternates
Erumanen ne Menuvu	Jennena Arba	Lera Mandadtem
Erumanen ne Menuvu	Pobre Rady Boy	Leonardo Pangundas
Lambiangan	Tessie Ambol	Linda Mical
Lambiangan	Leticio Datuwata	Nonie Uca
Limbubungan Higaonon	Samsoding Capal	Jhoel Alingasa
Limbubungan Higaonon	Carylle Vee Kalaw	Barbara Maque
Teduray	Jo Genna Jover	Ella Sheryl Benito
Teduray	Ludivico Marcelino Jr.	Ernesto Mokudef

== See also ==
- Indigenous Peoples Mandatory Representative, indigenous representatives in other local government units outside the Bangsamoro in the Philippines.
