= Traditional leaders in the Bangsamoro Parliament =

Traditional Leaders
- Sectoral representation for the Bangsamoro Parliament
- Represents: Traditional leaders of the sultanates and royal houses of Bangsamoro

Current Sectoral representation
- Created: 2026
- Seats: One
- Group: UBJP
- Members: Marjanie Macasalong (taking office on October 30, 2026)

The Traditional Leaders sector is a constituency in the Bangsamoro Parliament. The Parliament reserves a single seat for traditional leaders of the royal sultanates and royal houses of the Bangsamoro.

== Background ==
=== Original setup ===
The Bangsamoro Parliament, as provided for by the Bangsamoro Electoral Code of 2023, is mandated to reserve eight seats for sectoral representatives. These include the Non-Moro Indigenous Peoples (NMIP), Settler Communities, Women, Youth, 'Ulama, and Traditional Leaders.

All six sectors were supposed to select their representatives through their respective sectoral assemblies.

The following institutions were explicitly named in Section 31 of the Bangsamoro Electoral Code.

- Sulu Sultanate (Note: Still considered relevant by the Bangsamoro Commission for the Preservation of Cultural Heritage Resolution No. 1 of 2025, despite the Supreme Court ruling excluding Sulu province from the Bangsamoro in 2024.)
- Sultanates of Maguindanao, Kabuntalan, and Buayan
- Royal House of Ranao
- Royal House of Iranun

The Intra-Sultanate Assembly was originally intended to determine the rotational order for the four groups from which the Traditional Leaders sectoral representative would be selected. Under the original guidelines, the Sultanates of Maguindanao, Kabuntalan, and Buayan were treated as a single cluster and were to determine their own internal rotation.

=== Plurality vote ===
Bangsamoro Act No. 88 was passed, amending the Bangsamoro Electoral Code and providing that all sectors except the NMIP shall elect their representatives through a direct plurality of valid votes.

== List of Traditional Leaders MPs ==
Portrait	Member (Lifespan)	Term of office	Group	Parliament	Electoral history
	Marjanie Macasalong (1985–)	October 30, 2026	UBJP*	1st Parliament	Elected in 2026

- (*) sectoral wing of a regional political party.

== Elections ==
=== 2026 ===
2026 Bangsamoro Parliament election for the Traditional Leaders sectoral representation
Party	Candidate	Votes	%
UBJP	Marjanie Macasalong	752,919	41.19
BGC	Pax Mangudadatu	406,444	23.31
ISLPI	Susana Anayatin	224,459	12.88
BFP	Datuteng Gumbila	154,782	8.88
RHSUMA	Abdul Hamidullah Atar	94,125	5.40
DTLO	Nursharif Maulana	58,878	3.38
RHSUPA	Sailaney Benito	29,041	1.67
Royals	Tharhata Ampatuan	11,045	0.63
RSL	Jehad Hadji Nor	7,082	0.41
RSEU	Mangontawar Amatonding	6,841	0.39
Total votes		1,743,323	100.00
UBJP win (new seat)			
Source: Commission on Elections, Philippine News Agency
