= Marjanie Macasalong =

Member of the Bangsamoro Parliament for the Traditional Leaders
- Incumbent
- Assumed office October 30, 2026
- Chief Minister: Abdulraof Macacua
- Preceded by: Office established

Member of the Bangsamoro Transition Authority Parliament
- In office 2019 – February 2025
- Nominated by: Moro Islamic Liberation Front
- Appointed by: Rodrigo Duterte; Bongbong Marcos
- Chief Minister: Murad Ebrahim

Personal details
- Born: October 29, 1985 (age 41) Lanao del Sur, Philippines
- Party: United Bangsamoro Justice Party
- Spouse: Ni'mah Ummu Hani Barra
- Children: 4

Marjanie Salic Mimbantas-Macasalong is a Filipino politician and youth advocate who was a member of the Bangsamoro Transition Authority Parliament from 2019 to 2025.

== Early life and education ==
Marjanie Macasalong was born on October 29, 1985 in Lanao del Sur to Moro Islamic Liberation Front (MILF) vice chairman Aleem Abdul-Aziz Mimbantas and Hadja Azizah Salic.

Macasalong studied at the Gombak campus of International Islamic University Malaysia (IIUM) where he obtained a bachelor's degree. He also graduated with a master's and doctorate degree at IIUM's International Islamic Institute of Islamic Thought and Civilization.

== Career ==
=== Moro Islamic Liberation Front ===
Macasalong like his father is a member of the MILF. He was appointed as vice chairman of the Information Committee of the group in 2025.

=== Youth advocacy ===
Macasalong has led the Marawi-based Coalition of Moro Youth Movement (CMYM). The CMYM under his leadership advocated for the passage of the Bangsamoro Basic Law which proposed the establishment of a Bangsamoro autonomous region to replace the Autonomous Region in Muslim Mindanao

=== Bangsamoro government ===
Macasalong has been a chairperson of the Bangsamoro Youth Commission since its establishment in 2020.

He has been part of the Bangsamoro Transition Authority (BTA) which has been serving as the interim Bangsamoro Parliament from 2019 to February 2025.

In the May 2025 election, Macasalong run for the position of vice governor of Lanao del Sur under the United Bangsamoro Justice Party (UBJP). He lost to incumbent Mujam Adiong.

He ran for a seat for the traditional leaders' sector in the Bangsamoro Parliament in the first 2026 regional election under the traditional leaders sectoral wing of the UBJP. He had sitted as Sultan sa Masiu. He won the sole seat, securing his place in the first regular parliament that will convene in October 2026.

== Personal life ==
Marjanie Macasalong is married to Ni'mah Ummu Hani Barra with whom he has four children; a son and three daughters. Macasalong's father died in 2012.
