= Youth sector in the Bangsamoro Parliament =

Youth
- Sectoral representation for the Bangsamoro Parliament
- Represents: Ulama

Current Sectoral representation
- Created: 2026
- Seats: 1
- Group: UBJP
- Member: Sulfry Abbas

The Youth sector is a constituency in the Bangsamoro Parliament. The Parliament reserves a single seat for the youth in the Bangsamoro.

== Background ==
The Bangsamoro Parliament, as provided for by the Bangsamoro Electoral Code of 2023, is mandated to reserve eight seats for sectoral representatives. These include the Non-Moro Indigenous Peoples (NMIP), Settler Communities, Traditional Leaders, Ulama, Women, and Youth.

The Ulama sector consist of "Muslim religious scholars and chief religious authorities".

All six sectors were supposed to select their representatives through their respective sectoral assemblies. However, Bangsamoro Act No. 88 was passed, amending the Bangsamoro Electoral Code and providing that all sectors except the NMIP shall elect their representatives through a direct plurality of valid votes. No maximum voting age is imposed for voters to be eligible to vote the representative of the youth sector.

== List of youth sector MPs ==
Portrait	Member (Lifespan)	Term of office	Organization	Parliament	Electoral history
	Sulfry Abbas	October 30, 2026	UBJP*	1st Parliament	Elected in 2026

- (*) sectoral wing of a regional political party.

== Elections ==
=== 2026 ===
2026 Bangsamoro Parliament election for the Youth sectoral representation
Party	Candidate	Votes	%
UBJP	Sulfry Abbas	651,269	40.56
BGC	Jeff Adiong	601,157	37.44
BFP	Nur-Jamil Ibrahim	353,298	22.00
Total votes		1,605,724	100.00
UBJP win (new seat)			
Source: Commission on Elections, Philippine News Agency
