= Flag of the Autonomous Region in Muslim Mindanao =

Autonomous Region in Muslim Mindanao
- Use: Civil and state flag
- Proportion: 6:11
- Adopted: June 15, 1992 (ARMM) March 4, 2019 (Provisional BARMM)
- Relinquished: August 28, 2019 (BARMM)
- Design: A horizontal tricolor of blue, white and red with one yellow five-pointed star on the blue band; a green circle filled with yellow elements — a tilted crescent moon nearly enclosing four smaller five-pointed stars on the white band and a silver kris on the red band.
- Official regional emblem for vertical display
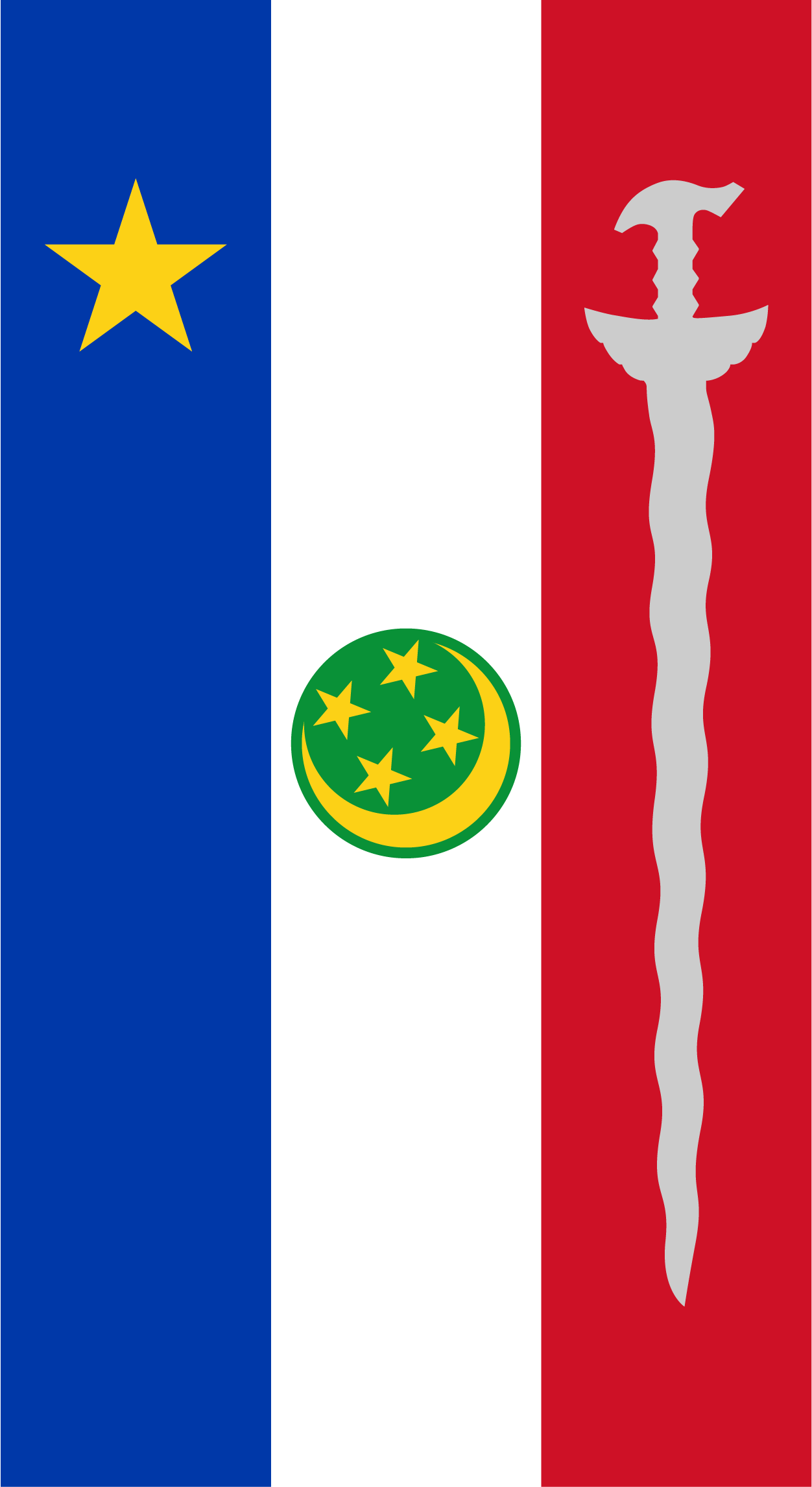

The flag of the Autonomous Region in Muslim Mindanao was used in secondary positions of honor to the national flag of the Philippines during the region's existence.

The flag's legal basis is Muslim Autonomy Act No. 12, in which it is legally referred to as the ARMM's Official Regional Emblem. This law was passed by the ARMM Regional Legislative Assembly on 15 June 1992 and signed into law by Regional Governor Zacaria Candao on 16 July 1992. The law identifies the flag as "reflective of [the Region's] legend, historical aspirations, and cultural heritage."

== Design and specifications ==
The flag is a horizontal triband of blue, white and red, each of equal width. On the blue stripe is a big yellow star, fixed 8 inches (0.66 feet) from the hoist edge. On the red stripe is a silver kris, fixed 8 inches (0.66 feet) from the hoist edge with the handle on the hoist side of the stripe. Centered within the white stripe is a green circle, contained within which is a yellow crescent moon. The moon is positioned at "an acute angle...towards the big star," and embracing four smaller yellow stars.

According to Section 3 of MMAA No. 12 the official dimensions of the flag are 3 feet by 5.5 feet, giving it a width:length proportion of 6:11; per Section 4 of the same law the flag may also be reproduced in smaller sizes for "ceremonial and symbolic functions and activities." The flag is described in Section 3 of MMAA No. 12 as if it were vertically displayed: the colors are listed from "left" to "right" instead of top to bottom; the kris handle and the big star are distanced 8 inches from the "top" (i.e. the hoist); and the tip of the kris blade is identified as pointing "downwards."

The flag is explicitly identified as containing six distinct colors: blue, white red, yellow, green and silver. However the 1992 ARMM flag law does not define the exact shade of these colors. The lack of specifications on other elements — the exact length, shape/form and blade orientation of the kris; the exact size and shape of the big star and which direction its apex points towards; the exact size of the circular emblem; the exact sizes, shapes and orientations of the small stars and the crescent moon, as well as their arrangements — has also resulted in the proliferation of many flag variations. Variants which incorrectly orient the crescent moon toward the fly, instead of positioning it at an angle facing the big star at the upper hoist, also exist and continue to be in use.

=== Number of small stars ===
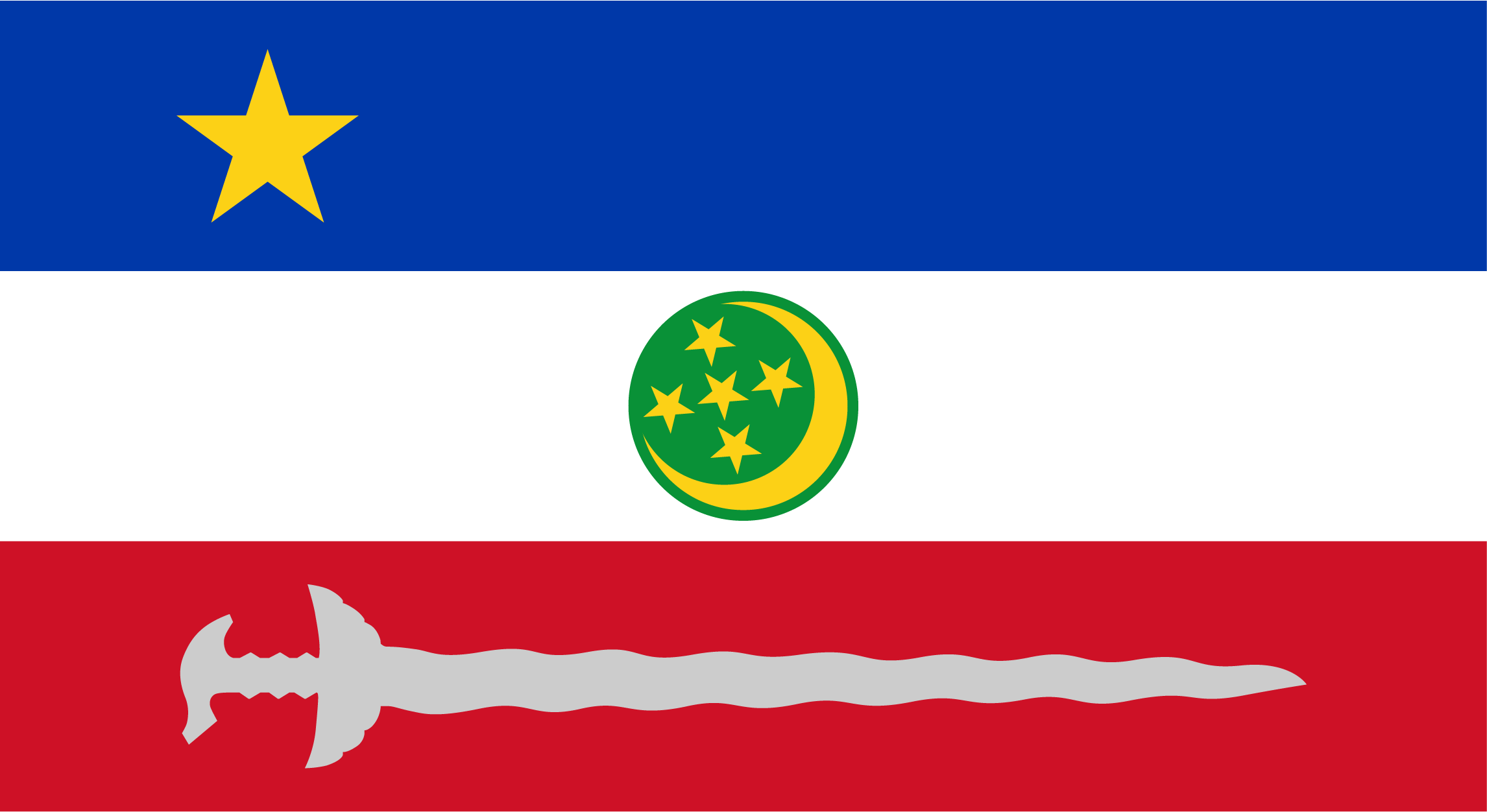
Unofficial variant with five small stars

After the accession of Basilan into the Autonomous Region in 2001 the ARMM Regional Legislative Assembly enacted Muslim Mindanao Autonomy Act No. 138 in November 2002 to legally amend the design of the Official Seal of the Autonomous Region by increasing the number of stars from four to five.

However the Regional Legislative Assembly has not yet made any amendment to the original ARMM flag law (MMAA No. 12), making the design with four smaller stars the de jure official version. At present versions with five or six smaller stars are also in prevalent use around the Autonomous Region.

The version with five smaller stars reflect the current number of the Autonomous Region's constituent provinces and is thus the most symbolically accurate version of the regional flag. Those with six smaller stars were only symbolically accurate from 2006 to 2008, when the province of Shariff Kabunsuan briefly existed.

== Symbolism ==
Per Section 3 of MMAA No. 12, the elements within the regional flag are officially interpreted as follows:

Colors:

- Blue — "peace and tranquility"
- White — "purity and righteousness"
- Red — "the bloody struggle of [the region's] people for self-identity and self-determination"
- Green and yellow within the central emblem — "the abundance of vegetation in, and the culture of the inhabitants of, the Autonomous Region"

Other elements:

- Big star — "the Sovereignty of the Republic of the Philippines over the Autonomous Region and its constituent Provinces"
- Crescent moon — "the predominance of the Muslim inhabitants in the Autonomous Region"
- Four smaller stars — the region's original constituent Provinces of Lanao del Sur, Maguindanao, Sulu and Tawi-Tawi
- Kris — "a symbol of authority used by the major tribes in the Autonomous Region," as well as "the valor and perseverance of the Bangsamoro people in their quest for self-rule."

== Use ==
The ARMM regional flag is to be raised in mast to the left of the Philippine flag, at a distance of at least 2 meters apart from each other. The ARMM flag's mast is always to be one foot (0.3 meters) lower in height.

It is mandatory for the flag to be displayed in all educational institutions (public and private schools, colleges and universities), public offices, government institutions and government-owned or -controlled corporations within the Autonomous Region. The flag may also be used — "where necessary" — in "ceremonial and symbolic functions and activities," using smaller reproductions of the flag.

The flag was adopted as provisional by the successor region of the ARMM, the Bangsamoro Autonomous Region. Under the new region's charter, the Bangsamoro Organic Law, the Bangsamoro region is entitled to have its own flag and coat of arms to be legally referred to as the "Bangsamoro symbol".

== See also ==
- Flag of Bangsamoro
- Seal of the Autonomous Region in Muslim Mindanao
- Emblem of Bangsamoro
