= Seal of the Autonomous Region in Muslim Mindanao =

- Armiger: Autonomous Region in Muslim Mindanao
- Adopted: 5 September 1990 (original); 25 November 2002 (revised)
- Relinquished: 26 February 2019
- Shield: In Vert, a decrescent Or engulfing inverted kris hilt end Argent between five small mullets Or and one big mullet Or

The Seal of the Autonomous Region in Muslim Mindanao was the official insignia of the government of the Autonomous Region in Muslim Mindanao, Philippines.

== History ==
The adoption of the official seal was the ARMM Regional Legislative Assembly's first legislative act. Muslim Mindanao Autonomy Act (MMAA) No. 1 was passed on 3 September 1990 and approved two days later by Regional Governor Zacaria Candao.

After Basilan (excluding Isabela City) voted to join the ARMM in 2001, the seal's original design was amended by increasing the number of small stars from four to five through MMAA No. 138, which was passed in November 2002.

== Specifications ==
Section 2 of MMAA No. 1 (as amended by MMAA No. 138) specifies the design of the Official Seal of the Autonomous Region in Muslim Mindanao as follows:

- The Seal is circular in form, and consists of an "outer portion" and a "center."
- All rendered in green color within the Seal's outer circular band are two sets of text — the full capitalized name of the region in the upper portion, and the words "Official Seal" in the lower.
  - No color is specified for the outer band's background, but it is usually rendered in white.
  - In most variants of the Seal the words "Official Seal" are fully capitalized; it is rendered in a smaller size or thinner font as the region's name usually, but not always.
  - No actual separator between the two sets of text was specified, but most variants of the seal use roundels, and in rare instances, mullets.
  - Some variants of the Seal used by some agencies erroneously render the text in black color.
- The background of the Seal's inner circular field is green. In the inner field's center (in reality, always right-of-center) is a "partially drawn" kris with its "handle" (hilt) pointing toward the top. To the left and right of the hilt are five small yellow stars and one big yellow star, respectively. All these are "partially engulf[ed]" by a yellow crescent moon.
  - No orientation is specified for the crescent moon, but de facto it always has its horns pointing to the right (i.e., a decrescent in heraldry).
  - No specification is provided about the size of the crescent moon or its distance to the edge of the central circular field. Many variants have a thin border between the moon and the edge, while some do not.
  - No details on the design and orientation of the kris is specified, leading to a large number of variations.
  - The arrangement of the five stars is not specified. By far the most common (and the de facto standard) is a staggered three-line arrangement of 2-1-2 stars, but a variant with the stars arranged in a ring pattern is also known to be in use.

== Symbolism ==
Section 2 of MMAA No. 1 (as amended by MMMAA No. 138) provides the official interpretation of the elements within the Seal as follows:

Colors:

- Green — symbolizes the region's "fertile soil, rich vegetation and animal life, and abundant natural resources"
- White (kris) — represents "purity"
- Yellow (moon) — "typifies the social class structure of [the region's] major tribes"

Other elements:

- Kris — "a common symbol of the authority of the major tribes in the area;" in a "slightly drawn" state to represent use "for peace"
- Crescent moon — "symbolizes the predominance of [the region's] Muslim populace
- Five small stars — represents the five provinces constituting the region: Basilan, Lanao del Sur, Maguindanao, Sulu and Tawi-Tawi
- Big star — "represents the Republic of the Philippines"

== See also ==
- Flag of the Autonomous Region in Muslim Mindanao
- Flag of Bangsamoro
- Seal of Bangsamoro
