= Ulama in the Bangsamoro Parliament =

Ulama
- Sectoral representation for the Bangsamoro Parliament
- Represents: Ulama

Current Sectoral representation
- Created: 2026
- Seats: 1
- Group: UBJP
- Member: Muhammad Nadzir Ebil

The Ulama is a constituency in the Bangsamoro Parliament. The Parliament reserves a single seat for Muslim religious leaders in the Bangsamoro.

== Background ==
The Bangsamoro Parliament, as provided for by the Bangsamoro Electoral Code of 2023, is mandated to reserve eight seats for sectoral representatives. These include the Non-Moro Indigenous Peoples (NMIP), Settler Communities, Traditional Leaders, Youth, Women, and Ulama.

The Ulama sector consist of "Muslim religious scholars and chief religious authorities".

All six sectors were supposed to select their representatives through their respective sectoral assemblies. However, Bangsamoro Act No. 88 was passed, amending the Bangsamoro Electoral Code and providing that all sectors except the NMIP shall elect their representatives through a direct plurality of valid votes. Voters, regardless of religion, are eligible to vote for the representative of the Ulama sector.

== List of Ulama sector MPs ==
Portrait	Member (Lifespan)	Term of office	Organization	Parliament	Electoral history
	Muhammad Nadzir Ebil	October 30, 2026	UBJP*	1st Parliament	Elected in 2026

- (*) sectoral wing of a regional political party.

== Elections ==
=== 2026 ===
2026 Bangsamoro Parliament election for the Ulama sectoral representation
Party	Candidate	Votes	%
UBJP	Muhammad Nadzir Ebil	679,905	42.04
BGC	Alibasher Abdullatif	551,525	34.11
BFP	Marhan Borhan	385,670	23.85
Total votes		1,617,100	100.00
UBJP win (new seat)			
Source: Commission on Elections, Philippine News Agency
