= Indigenous Peoples Mandatory Representative =

- Member of: Sangguniang Barangay, Sangguniang Bayan, Sangguniang Panlungsod, or Sangguniang Panlalawigan
- Nominator: Indigenous cultural communities
- Constituting instrument: Indigenous Peoples' Rights Act of 1997
- Formation: 1997

Indigenous Peoples Mandatory Representatives (IPMRs) are members of legislatures in the Philippines who represent the interests of indigenous peoples in their respective constituencies.

== Background ==
Under the Indigenous Peoples' Rights Act of 1997, the rights of indigenous cultural communities (ICCs) and indigenous peoples (IPs) to participate at all levels of decision-making are recognized.

This mandates local government units (LGUs) with ICCs/IPs – barangays, municipalities, cities, and provinces – to have Indigenous Peoples Mandatory Representatives (IPMRs) in their sanggunian or legislatures.

IPMRs, as members of local legislatures, are expected to represent the interests of their respective communities and craft an IP agenda in consultation with elders and the rest of the IP community. They can also sponsor ordinances and resolutions and conduct committee hearings.

== Current representation ==
As of 2020, there were 4,294 IPMRs in the Philippines, with most of them at the barangay level.

- Province – 32
- City – 30
- Municipality – 380
- Barangay – 3,852

As of 2022, there are 67 LGUs with issues regarding the acceptance of IPMRs and 530 other LGUs that are eligible to have IPMRs but do not have one.

== Provincial IPMRs ==
The following provinces have or had IPMRs.

Cordillera Administrative Region

- Abra
- Apayao
- Benguet
- Kalinga
- Mountain Province

Ilocos Region

- Ilocos Norte
- Ilocos Sur
- La Union

Cagayan Valley

- Batanes
- Isabela
- Nueva Vizcaya
- Quirino

Central Luzon

- Aurora
- Bulacan
- Nueva Ecija
- Zambales

Calabarzon

- Quezon
- Rizal

Mimaropa

- Occidental Mindoro
- Oriental Mindoro
- Palawan
- Romblon

Bicol Region

- Camarines Norte

Western Visayas

- Capiz

Zamboanga Peninsula

- Zamboanga del Norte

Northern Mindanao

- Bukidnon
- Misamis Oriental

Caraga

- Agusan del Norte
- Agusan del Sur
- Surigao del Sur

Soccsksargen

- Cotabato
- Sarangani
- South Cotabato
- Sultan Kudarat

Davao Region

- Davao de Oro
- Davao del Norte
- Davao del Sur
- Davao Oriental

Bangsamoro

- Basilan
- Maguindanao del Norte

Former provinces

- Maguindanao

== See also ==
- Non-Moro Indigenous Peoples in the Bangsamoro Parliament
