= Ministry of Indigenous Peoples' Affairs =

Regional executive department of the Bangsamoro Autonomous Region

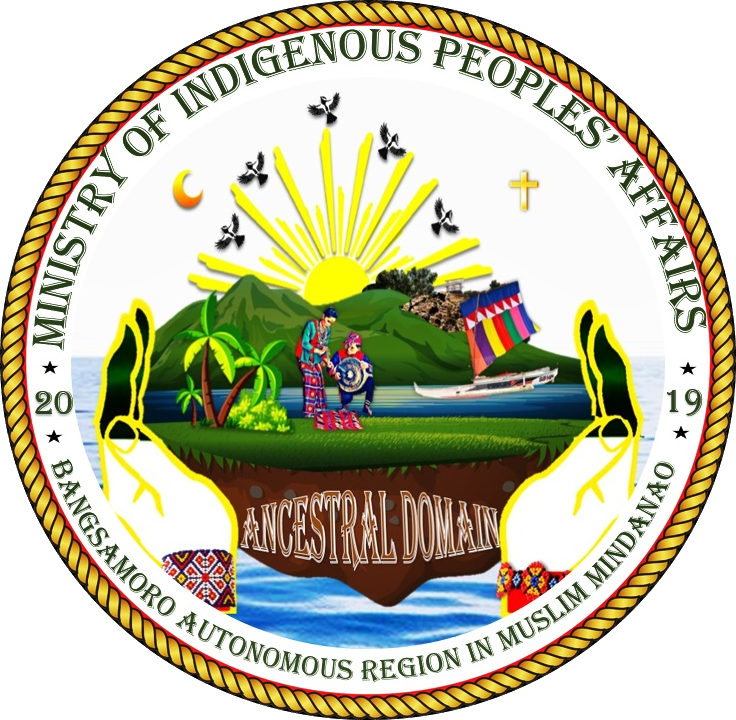

Agency overview
- Jurisdiction: Regional government of Bangsamoro
- Minister responsible: Guiamal Abdulrahman, Minister of Indigenous Affairs
- Website: mipa.bangsamoro.gov.ph

The Ministry of Indigenous Peoples' Affairs (MIPA) is the regional executive department of the Bangsamoro Autonomous Region in Muslim Mindanao (BARMM) responsible for affairs relating to non-Muslim indigenous people in the region.

== History ==
The Bangsamoro Organic Law, the legislation which serves as the charter of the Bangsamoro Autonomous Region in Muslim Mindanao mandates the establishment of a ministry to deal with the affairs of non-Muslim indigenous people in the region as well as work with the regional implementation of national-level legislation concerning indigenous peoples.

Timuay Ulama was appointed on February 26, 2019, by interim Chief Minister Murad Ebrahim as the newly reconfigured Bangsamoro department's first minister.

== Ministers ==
#	Minister	Term began	Term ended	Chief Minister
1	Melanio Ulama	February 26, 2019	July 31, 2025	Murad Ebrahim
1	Melanio Ulama	February 26, 2019	July 31, 2025	Abdulraof Macacua
2	Guiamal Abdulrahman	August 1, 2025	November 5, 2026	Abdulraof Macacua
3	Jo Genna Jover	November 5, 2026	incumbent	Abdulraof Macacua
