= Shariff Kabunsuan Cultural Complex =

Convention center in Philippines

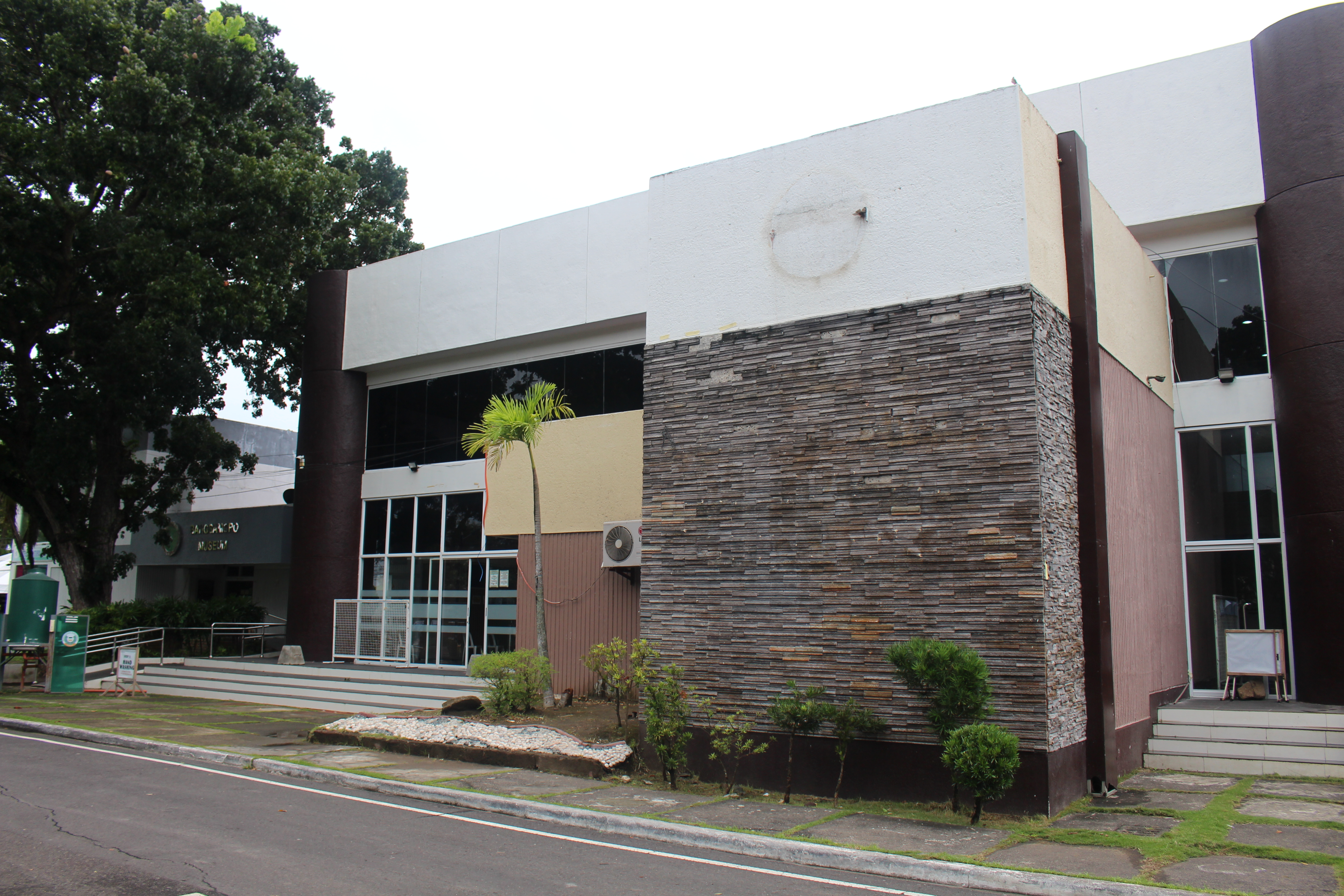
- Facade of the SKCC
- Interactive map of the Shariff Kabunsuan Cultural Complex area
- Alternative names: SKCC

General information
- Location: Cotabato City, BARMM Complex, Brgy. Rosary Heights VII, Cotabato City, Philippines
- Coordinates: 7°11′47″N 124°14′46″E
- Current tenants: Bangsamoro Museum
- Owner: Regional Government of Bangsamoro

The Shariff Kabunsuan Cultural Complex (SKCC) is a convention center in Cotabato City, Philippines. It was the meeting place of the Bangsamoro Parliament which is the regional legislature of Bangsamoro from 2019 to 2022. Its main hall has a seating capacity of 490. The building was built during the time of Simeon Datumanong, to provide space for an auditorium, library, and museum for residents of Cotabato City.

In February 4, 2019, a new museum named the Bangsamoro Museum was inaugurated by the now-defunct Autonomous Region in Muslim Mindanao regional government. The museum is managed by the Bangsamoro government's Bureau on Cultural Heritage.
