= Settlers of Bangsamoro =

Total population
- Less than 1.1 million (2020)

Religion
- Predominantly Christianity (specifically: Roman Catholicism, Protestantism), minority Islam, and other

Related ethnic groups
- Tagalog, Bisaya, Chinese, and others

The settler communities of the Bangsamoro of the Philippines refers to the population in the autonomous region who are not associated with the Moro or Lumad peoples.

== Background ==
The Bangsamoro Administrative Code defines a settler as those who are "not native inhabitants" of the Bangsamoro region but "who came to permanently reside therein as part of the Philippine government's resettlement programs or who voluntarily opted to migrate thereto" including their descendants who continue to reside in the region. They are part of the "Tri-Peoples" of Mindanao alongside the Moro and the Lumad peoples.

Bangsamoro according to 2020 census of the Philippine Statistics Authority (PSA) has 4.4 million people. The top three largest ethnic groups are Maguindanao (26.4%), Tausūg (23.3%), and Maranao (22.7%) are considered part of the Moro peoples.

The settlers belong to various ethnic groups including but not limited to the Tagalogs, the Bisaya, the Chinese.

== History ==
The wider Mindanao was majority Moro and Lumad. The Spanish during its Spanish colonization of the Philippines colonization of the Philippine archipelago were only able to set up scattered settlements. During the American administration of the Philippines, migration of people from Luzon and Visayas to Mindanao where agricultural colonies were set up. Settlers and Moro communities intermingled in these settlements to build better working relations. It also served as a tool to quell peasant unrest in the settler's area of origin.

After the Philippines attained independence from the United States after World War II, governments continued to organize resettlement programs for landless Filipinos from the north. However in the 1960s, it was noted that only 10 percent of migrants were beneficiaries of such programs and moved voluntarily in search for opportunities of a better living conditions.

== Religion ==
Majority of the settlers in Bangsamoro are Christians, Roman Catholic or some form of Protestantism. However, some of them have converted to Islam but remains distinct from the Moro.

== Representation in the government ==
The Bangsamoro regional government has created the Office of Settler Communities (OSC) to address the concern of the settler population in the region in 2021.

The settler community also has two reserved sectoral seats in the Bangsamoro Parliament. For the purpose of elections, organizations seeking to represent the community can field two nominees each.
