= Bangsamoro Parliament =

Autonomous regional parliament of Bangsamoro, Philippines

Coordinates: 7.1964°N 124.2461°E

Bangsamoro Parliament Parlamento ng Bangsamoro برلمان بانجسامورو
- 1st Bangsamoro Parliament
- Seal of the Bangsamoro Parliament

Type
- Type: Unicameral
- Term limits: 3 terms (9 years)

History
- Founded: March 29, 2019
- Preceded by: ARMM Regional Legislative Assembly
- New session started: October 30, 2026

Leadership
- Chief Minister: Abdulraof Macacua (BFP) since March 12, 2025
- Speaker of the Parliament: Amer Zaakaria Rakim (BGC) since October 30, 2026
- Deputy Speakers: Abrar Hataman (BFP); Tina Matolo (BFP); Tawakal Midtimbang (UBJP); Amil Bahar Mawallil (BGC); Ibrahim Ibay (BFP); Hosni Macapodi (SIAP); Lampa Pandi (UBJP); Amir Balindong (UBJP); Suwaib Oranon (BFP); Jose Lorena (Raayat); since October 30, 2026
- Floor Leader: Johari Abu (BFP) since October 30, 2026

Structure
- Seats: 80
- Political groups: Majority (53): BFP (31); BGC (8); SIAP (6); UBJP (4); PBP (1); Raayat (1); Nonpartisan (2); Minority (27): UBJP (26); Al Ittihad–UKB (1)

Elections
- Voting system: Parallel voting: 40 seats via party-list proportional representation; 36 seats via first-past-the-post voting; 2 seats via plurality block voting; 2 seats via acclamation
- Last election: September 14, 2026
- Next election: May 12, 2031

Meeting place
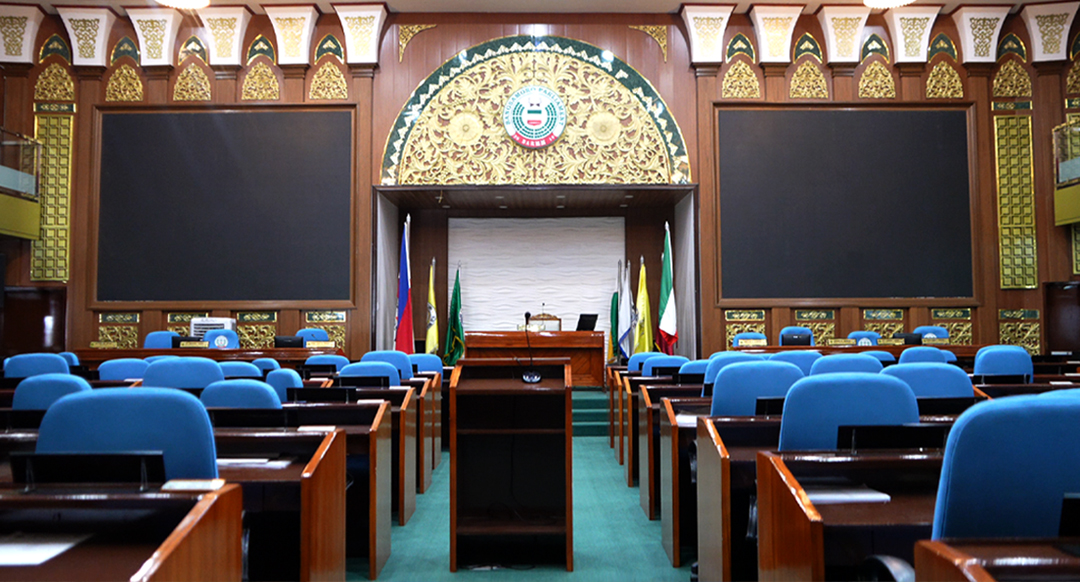
- Bangsamoro Parliament Building, Bangsamoro Government Center, Rosary Heights VII, Cotabato City

Website
- parliament.bangsamoro.gov.ph

Rules
- Rules, Procedures, and Practices of the BTA Parliament (Resolution No. 268, 2022) (English)

The Bangsamoro Parliament (Filipino: Parlamento ng Bangsamoro; Arabic: البرلمان بانجسامورو) is the devolved, unicameral legislature of Bangsamoro, an autonomous region of the Philippines. Its parliament building is located within the Bangsamoro Government Center, Cotabato City. It succeeded the ARMM Regional Legislative Assembly, the legislature of the former Autonomous Region in Muslim Mindanao.

The inaugural session of the Parliament was held on March 29, 2019, by the Bangsamoro Transition Authority, the region's interim governing body. The first session of the first regular Parliament was convened on October 30, 2026.

The Parliament consists of 80 members, known as members of parliament (MPs), who were elected in the 2026 parliamentary election.

== History ==
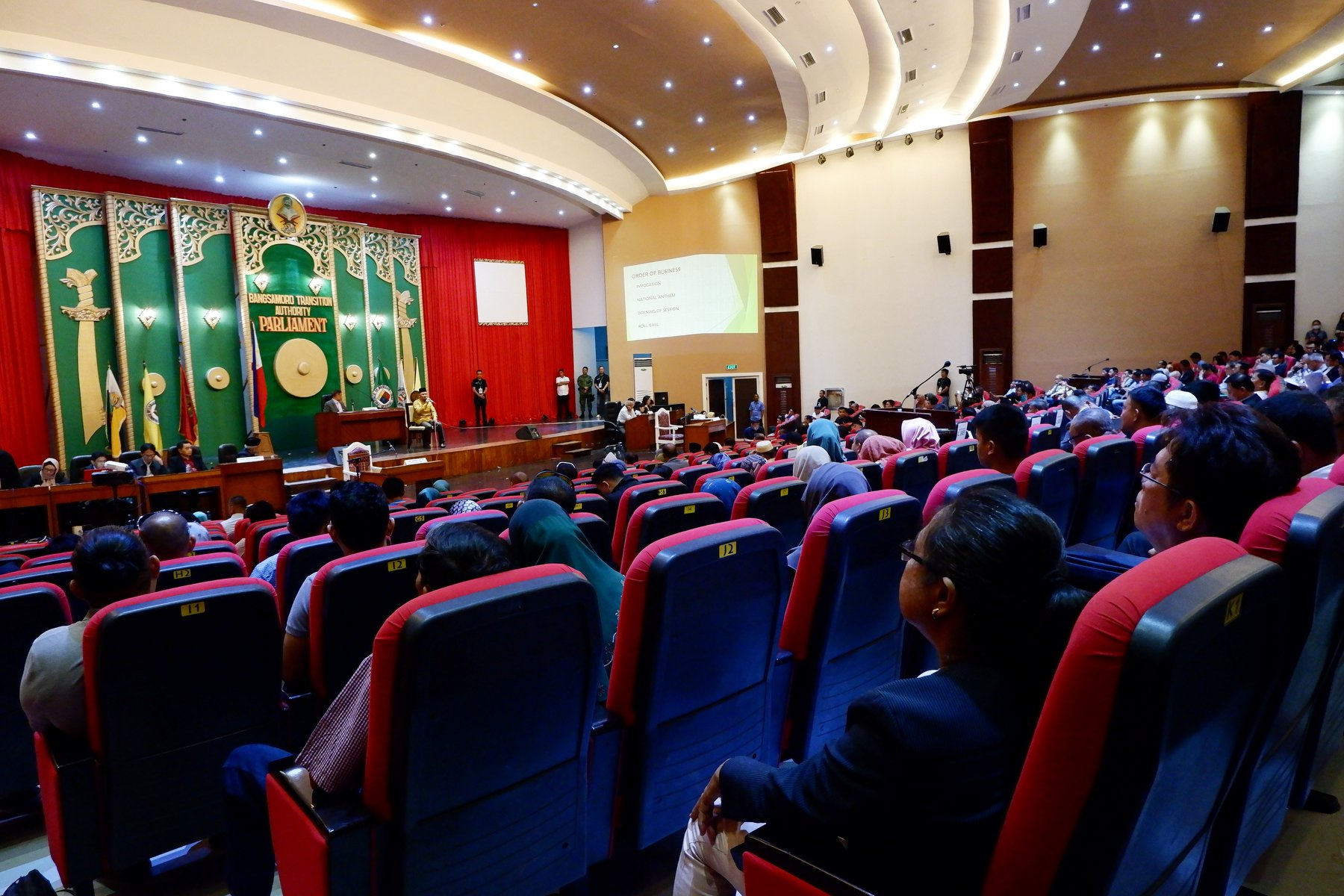
Old plenary hall at the Shariff Kabunsuan Cultural Complex auditorium

The 1987 Constitution provided for the creation of an autonomous region in Muslim Mindanao comprising provinces, cities, municipalities, and geographical areas that share a common and distinctive historical and cultural heritage, socioeconomic structures, and other relevant characteristics according to the framework of the Constitution, national sovereignty, and territorial integrity of the Philippines.

On July 27, 2018, President Rodrigo Duterte signed Republic Act 11054, known as the "Organic Law for the Bangsamoro Autonomous Region in Muslim Mindanao," replacing the Autonomous Region in Muslim Mindanao (ARMM) with the new Bangsamoro Autonomous Region in Muslim Mindanao. It provided that the region would have greater fiscal autonomy, a regional government, a Parliament, and its own justice system.

Article VII, Section 2 of the Bangsamoro Organic Law states that:

the powers of government shall be vested in the Parliament which shall exercise those powers and functions expressly granted to it in this Organic Law, and those necessary for, or incidental to, the proper governance and development of the Bangsamoro Autonomous Region. It shall set policies, legislate on matters within its authority, and elect a Chief Minister who shall exercise executive authority on its behalf.

The first Bangsamoro Parliament is an interim legislature headed by the Bangsamoro Transition Authority (BTA). The first set of members of the BTA took their oath on February 22, 2019. The effective abolishment of the precursor autonomous region, Autonomous Region in Muslim Mindanao (ARMM) took place following the official turnover of the ARMM to the Bangsamoro Autonomous Region occurred on February 26, 2019.

Pangalian Balindong was the first speaker of the Parliament, serving until his death from an undisclosed illness on October 2, 2025. He was succeeded by Mohammad Yacob on October 21, 2025. Sha Elijah Dumama-Alba served as the floor leader of the second interim Parliament until October 21, 2025, when she was elected one of the deputy speakers, and was succeeded by John Anthony Lim.

In the first interim Parliament, there was a majority leader (Lanang Ali Jr., an MILF nominee) and a minority leader (Laisa Alamia, a national government nominee), but these positions were scrapped in the second interim Parliament.

The first interim Bangsamoro Parliament had its inaugural session on March 29, 2019, and passed four resolutions, two of which involved the budget for the Bangsamoro region. The interim Bangsamoro Parliament's mandate was supposed to end on June 30, 2022, as per the Bangsamoro Organic Law, but this was extended to 2025 by law passed by President Rodrigo Duterte whose presidency ended on the same day the interim Parliament is supposed to be dissolved.

The second interim Parliament had its inaugural session on September 15, 2022. President Bongbong Marcos appointed a new set of members for the interim Parliament. The MILF nominees include people associated with the MNLF—eight from the Sema-Jikiri faction and seven from the Nur Misuari's faction. Misuari's group became part of the Parliament for the first time.

The 2026 parliamentary election, which elected members of the first regular parliament, resulted in a hung parliament, after the Bangsamoro Federalist Party topped the election, winning 31 seats, short of the number required to form a majority. The MILF-affiliated United Bangsamoro Justice Party placed second, winning 30 seats. The first regular parliament convened on October 30, 2026, when members formally assumed office.

=== Seat ===
The Bangsamoro Parliament building in 2022 which formerly hosted the ARMM Regional Legislative Assembly.

The Parliament first met at the auditorium of the Shariff Kabunsuan Cultural Complex located within the BARMM Complex in Cotabato City during the first interim Parliament from 2019 to 2022. Sessions were then regularly held at the Parliament Building, the former seat of the ARMM Regional Legislative Assembly, within the same complex since 2022.

The chamber's current design features traditional Islamic geometric patterns and cultural motifs, such as the okir. The speaker's rostrum has the Philippine national flag and the Bangsamoro flag on display, as per the Bangsamoro Organic Law.

On April 16, 2026, the four-storey Regional Assembly Building or the Sheikh Salamat Hashim Building was inaugurated. The building is meant to host committee hearings and policy deliberations of the Bangsamoro Parliament.

On October 5, 2026, a new ten-storey parliament building broke ground.

== Membership ==
As per law, the legislature should be composed of at least 80 members, who in turn are led by the speaker of the Parliament which was appointed from among the members of the legislature. Until June 30, 2019, 24 elective officials of the defunct Autonomous Region in Muslim Mindanao could have served as additional members.

40 percent of the Parliament seats are allotted to the representatives of Bangsamoro's parliamentary districts, although the districts are yet to be constituted. The Bangsamoro parliamentary districts will exist independently from the legislative districts used to determine representation in the national House of Representatives. Only the national Congress has the power to increase the composition of the Parliament.

There are also legal provisions to deter members of the Parliament to switch political party allegiance. Changing political party affiliation within the term of a member of Parliament would mean the forfeiture of their seat. Changing of affiliation within six months prior to a parliamentary election renders the person ineligible as a nominee of a political party seeking representation in the Parliament.

=== Allocation of seats ===
The Bangsamoro Organic Law apportioned the seats of the Bangsamoro Parliament across eight provinces. However, following the exclusion of Sulu, the Bangsamoro Parliamentary Districts Act of 2025 which was approved on January 12, 2026, reapportioned the seven seats originally allocated to Sulu to the remaining provinces.

Allocation of seats (2026 elections)
Type of seats		No. of seats		Election method
Type of seats		80		Election method
Party representatives		40		Proportional representation
Districts	Basilan	4	32	First-past-the-post (direct plurality) (Note: Sulu seats were distributed among the districts.)
Districts	Lanao del Sur	9	32	First-past-the-post (direct plurality)
Districts	Maguindanao del Norte	5	32	First-past-the-post (direct plurality)
Districts	Maguindanao del Sur	5	32	First-past-the-post (direct plurality)
Districts	Tawi-Tawi	4	32	First-past-the-post (direct plurality)
Districts	Cotabato City	3	32	First-past-the-post (direct plurality)
Districts	Special Geographic Area	2	32	First-past-the-post (direct plurality)
Reserved and sectoral representatives	Non-Moro Indigenous Peoples	2	8	Elected from within the Non-Moro Indigenous Peoples Committee
Reserved and sectoral representatives	Settlers	2	8	First-past-the-post (direct plurality)
Reserved and sectoral representatives	Women	1	8	First-past-the-post (direct plurality)
Reserved and sectoral representatives	Youth	1	8	First-past-the-post (direct plurality)
Reserved and sectoral representatives	Traditional leaders	1	8	Elected via a convention of the Bangsamoro Commission for the Preservation of Cultural Heritage
Reserved and sectoral representatives	Ulama	1	8	Elected from within the 'Ulama Assembly

== Committees ==
As with most legislative bodies, the Parliament uses committees that are constituted to specialize in particular areas of concern and to carry out specific functions. They are responsible for making recommendations to the plenary and preparing reports on the disposition of bills, resolutions, and other legislative matters.

The following is a list of parliamentary and statutory committees, along with a sole special committee and their respective chairpersons as of the first regular Parliament:

Committee		Chairperson
Parliamentary committees	Rules	Johari Abu
Parliamentary committees	Accounts	Ibrahim Ibay
Parliamentary committees	Ethics and Privileges	Rayyan Mindalano
Parliamentary committees	Amendments	Naguib Sinarimbo
Parliamentary committees	Good Government, Accountability of Public Officers and Investigation (Blue Ribbon)	Zulfikar-Ali Bayam
Parliamentary committees	Ways and Means	Sittie Aisah Pansar
Special committee	Marawi Recovery, Reconstruction, and Rehabilitation	Camid Gandamra Jr.
Statutory committees	Finance, Budget, and Management	Kitem Kadatuan Jr.
Statutory committees	Agriculture, Fisheries, and Agrarian Reform	Ma-arouph Candao
Statutory committees	Basic, Higher, and Technical Education	Tomanda Antok
Statutory committees	Trade, Investment, and Tourism	Rima Hasan
Statutory committees	Labor and Employment	Rashdi Adiong
Statutory committees	Social Services and Development	Hosni Macapodi
Statutory committees	Indigenous Peoples’ Affairs	Leticio Datuwata
Statutory committees	Health	Pala Gandamra
Statutory committees	Transportation and Communications	Hadjimar Matba
Statutory committees	Public Order and Safety	Rafsanjani Ali
Statutory committees	Human Settlements and Development	Arimao Asum
Statutory committees	Science and Technology	Rauf Adiong
Statutory committees	Public Works	Karwin Hamjani
Statutory committees	Local Government	Alindatu Pagayao
Statutory committees	Environment, Natural Resources, and Energy	Michael Midtimbang
Statutory committees	Bangsamoro Justice System	Jose Lorena
Statutory committees	Women, Youth, Children, and Persons with Disabilities	Sittie Aisah Pansar

== Current composition ==
=== Parliamentary groups ===
Composition of the Parliament as of October 30, 2026
Party/group	Seats
Bangsamoro Federalist Party (Note: Includes the votes for Abdulraof Macacua, who ran in Maguindanao del Norte's 3rd district as an independent candidate.)	31
United Bangsamoro Justice Party	30 (Note: Includes six sectoral representative seats.)
BARMM Grand Coalition	8
Serbisyong Inklusibo–Alyansang Progresibo (Note: Member party of the BARMM Grand Coalition.)	6
Al Ittihad–UKB Party	1
Progresibong Bangsamoro Party	1
Raayat Democratic Party	1
Non-Moro Indigenous Peoples	2
Total	80

=== Leadership ===
Office	MP	Party	Constituency
Speaker	Amer Zaakaria Rakim	BGC	Proportional representation
Deputy Speakers	Abrar Hataman	BFP	Basilan–3rd
Deputy Speakers	Tina Matolo	BFP	Tawi-Tawi–3rd
Deputy Speakers	Tawakal Midtimbang	UBJP	Maguindanao del Sur–1st
Deputy Speakers	Amil Bahar Mawallil	BGC	Proportional representation
Deputy Speakers	Ibrahim Ibay	BFP	Maguindanao del Norte–2nd
Deputy Speakers	Hosni Macapodi	SIAP	Lanao del Sur–6th
Deputy Speakers	Lampa Pandi	UBJP	Lanao del Sur–4th
Deputy Speakers	Amir Balindong	UBJP	Proportional representation
Deputy Speakers	Suwaib Oranon	BFP	Proportional representation
Deputy Speakers	Jose Lorena	Raayat	Proportional representation
Majority Floor Leader	Johari Abu	BFP	Proportional representation
Deputy Majority Floor Leaders	Abdel Razi Amin	BGC	Proportional representation
Deputy Majority Floor Leaders	Naguib Sinarimbo	BFP	Cotabato City–2nd
Deputy Majority Floor Leaders	Ishak Mastura	BFP	Maguindanao del Norte–5th
Deputy Majority Floor Leaders	Jaafar Apollo Mikhail Matalam	BFP	Proportional representation
Deputy Majority Floor Leaders	Alindatu Pagayao	BFP	Proportional representation
Deputy Majority Floor Leaders	Jay Hataman Salliman	BFP	Basilan–4th
Deputy Majority Floor Leaders	Julbert Que	BFP	Tawi-Tawi–1st

- Secretary-General: Bantuas Lucman
- Sergeant-at-Arms: To be elected

== Seal ==
Parliament seal from 2019 to 2021

The current seal of the Bangsamoro Parliament is in use since 2021 and its specifications is defined under Bangsamoro Autonomy Act No. 16. It is a circular symbol with a green, red, white, and yellow color scheme patterned after the Bangsamoro Flag and bears the name of the Parliament. Its central element is a shield bearing the Bangsamoro flag and is partially surrounded by a semicircle parliament diagram with 80 blocks signifying the number of seats in the Parliament. The book on top of the shield which represents the "living adherence of the Parliament to the rule of law," while the text "2019" represents the foundation year of Bangsamoro. The Bangsamoro Autonomy Act No. 16, as Parliament Bill No. 24 was passed by the Bangsamoro Parliament on January 19, 2021.

A previous version of the seal without the book and foundation year was used prior to the passage of the bill. The modified seal was formally adopted after the Chief Minister signed the bill into law on February 12, 2021.

== Historical composition ==
The following chart shows the historical composition of the Parliament after the beginning of every legislative period since the first interim Parliament in 2019.

=== Bangsamoro Transition Authority Parliament (2019–2026) ===
Moro Islamic Liberation Front / Government of the Philippines / Vacant			Total seats
1st BTA (Interim) Parliament	until June 30, 2019	40 / 35 / 31	106
1st BTA (Interim) Parliament	from June 30, 2019	41 / 39	80
2nd BTA (Interim) Parliament		40 / 39 / 1	80

=== Bangsamoro Parliament (2026–present) ===
BFP / UBJP / BGC / SIAP / Al Ittihad–UKB / PBP / Raayat / Non-Moro Indigenous Peoples		Total seats
1st Parliament	31 / 30 / 8 / 6 / 1 / 1 / 1 / 2	80

== See also ==
- Autonomous Region in Muslim Mindanao
- Bangsamoro
- ARMM Regional Legislative Assembly
- Bangsamoro Youth Model Parliament
