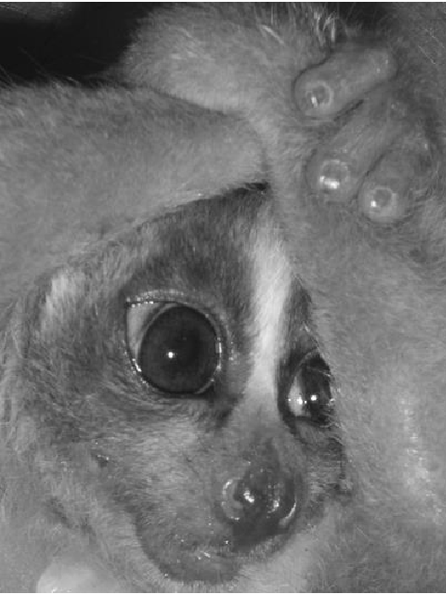

Conservation status
- Vulnerable (IUCN 3.1)
- CITES Appendix I

Scientific classification
- Kingdom: Animalia
- Phylum: Chordata
- Class: Mammalia
- Infraclass: Placentalia
- Order: Primates
- Suborder: Strepsirrhini
- Family: Lorisidae
- Genus: Nycticebus
- Species: N. menagensis

Binomial name
- Nycticebus menagensis (Lydekker, 1893)
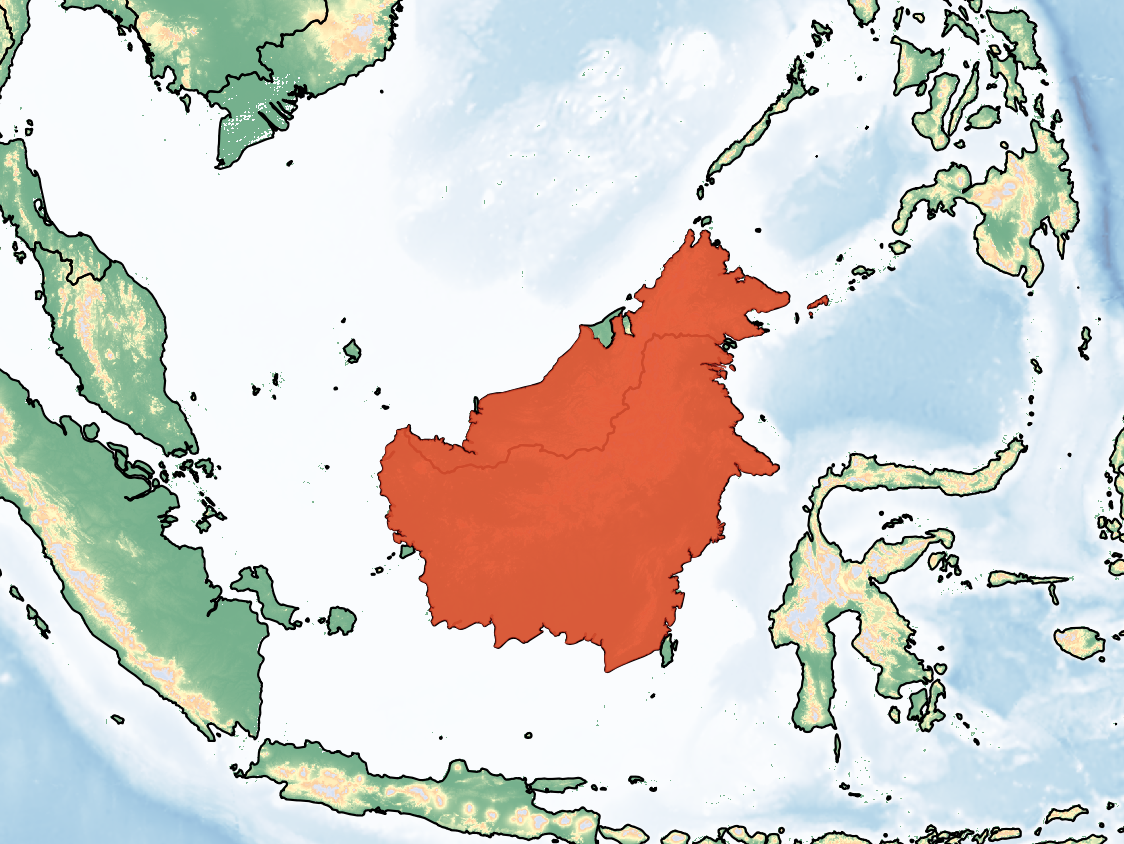

Synonyms
- Lemur menagensis Lydekker, 1893; Nycticebus philippinus Cabrera, 1908; Nycticebus coucang menagensis: Groves, 1971

= Philippine slow loris =

Species of primate

The Philippine slow loris (Nycticebus menagensis) is a strepsirrhine primate and a species of slow loris that is native to the north and east coastal areas of the island of Borneo, as well as the Sulu Archipelago in the Philippines. The species was first named as the Bornean slow loris in 1892, but lumped into the widespread Sunda slow loris (N. coucang) in 1952. However, it was promoted to full species status – again as the Bornean slow loris – based on molecular analysis in 2006. In 2013, two former subspecies of the Bornean slow loris were elevated to species status, and a new species—N. kayan—was recognized among the Bornean population.

Weighing 265–300 grams (9.3–10.6 oz), it is one of the smallest of the slow lorises, and can be distinguished from other slow lorises by its pale golden to red fur, the lack of markings on its head, and consistent absence of a second upper incisor. Like other slow lorises, it has a vestigial tail, round head, short ears, a curved grooming claw for grooming, and a gland that produces an oily toxin that the animal uses for defense. The Philippine slow loris is arboreal, nocturnal, and occurs in low densities, making it difficult to locate. It is also the least studied of Indonesia's slow lorises. It is found at elevations between 35–100 meters (115–328 ft) in primary and secondary lowland forest, gardens, and plantations. Information about its diet is limited, but it is suspected to be one of the more insectivorous slow loris species, and is also known to eat gum from woody plants.

The Bornean slow loris species complex – including the Philippine slow loris – was classified as "Vulnerable" by the International Union for Conservation of Nature (IUCN) in 2008, is included in CITES Appendix I, which prevents international commercial trade, and is protected by Indonesian law. Prior to being divided into four distinct species in 2013, it was found in numerous protected areas within its range, making it the least threatened of the slow lorises. However, since the taxonomic split, it may face a higher risk of extinction. It is sparsely distributed throughout its range and is threatened by illegal wildlife trade, including the exotic pet trade, and habitat loss.

== Taxonomy and phylogeny ==
The Bornean slow loris was first described based on specimens collected by Frank S. Bourns and Dean C. Worcester during the Menage Scientific Expedition to the Philippines and Borneo in the early 1890s. The original collection was made between 5 October and 5 November 1891 near Tataan, Tawi-Tawi Island, in the Philippines, however this type specimen is missing as of 2013. The specimens were given to Henry F. Nachtrieb, President of the Minnesota Academy of Sciences and Chairman of the Zoology Department at the University of Minnesota. Nachtrieb was the first to use the name menagensis in 1892, based on a description of the species sent to him by Worcester in 1891. Worcester's progress report included a description of the specimen and an explanation on how they had obtained it:

I now come to the curious mammal of which I enclose description. Shortly before we left for Tawi Tawi the Jesuit priest here, Padre Marche, informed us that just before our arrival he had made a trip to Tawi Tawi, and had bought of the Moros there a curious animal. He said it has the face of a bear, the hands of a monkey, moved like a sloth, and was called "cocam" by the natives ... I believe nothing of this kind has been found in the Philippines before, and it makes an important addition to the rather meager list of Philippine mammals. It is evidently one of the Lemuridae, but as generic characteristics are not given in the book I have, I cannot go farther.

— Dean C. Worcester

Nachtrieb did not assign the name to a specific genus, noting that it was "an undescribed member of the Lemuridae". The following year, the English naturalist Richard Lydekker published the combination Lemur menagensis in The Zoological Record. This makes Lydekker the authority of the species name menagensis, because he was the first to use the specific name in combination with the name of a genus, although some subsequent authors credited other workers.

In his influential 1953 book Primates: Comparative Anatomy and Taxonomy, the primatologist William Charles Osman Hill placed all the slow lorises in one species, N. coucang. In 1971, however, Colin Groves recognized the pygmy slow loris (N. pygmaeus) as a separate species, and divided N. coucang into four subspecies, including Nycticebus coucang menagensis. Nycticebus menagensis was elevated to the species level in 2006 when molecular analysis of DNA sequences of the D-loop and the cytochrome b gene demonstrated it to be genetically distinct from N. coucang. The genetic evidence was corroborated by both a previous study (1998) on morphology (based on craniodental measurements) that indicated distinct differences between the subspecies that were consistent with separation at the species level, and a later study (2010) of facial markings.

Early in its own taxonomic history, distinguishing coloration patterns and size differences resulted in the division of Nycticebus menagensis into four subspecies: N. m. bancanus, N. m. borneanus, N. m. menagensis, and N. m. philippinus. These later became taxonomic synonyms, although in 2013 N. bancanus and N. borneanus were elevated to species status based on unique facial markings. Furthermore, a new species—N. kayan—was also identified within the Bornean population. The southern Philippine slow lorises (N. m. philippinus or N. philippinus) identified by Spanish zoologist Ángel Cabrera in 1908 remains a synonym of N. menagensis, since the 2013 study was unable to find its type specimen and found no distinguishable characteristics between the two populations. The syntype for N. menagensis was collected by Lydekker in 1893 from the Philippine island of Tawi-Tawi, giving menagensis precedence over philippinus as the name of the species, under the Principle of Priority.

== Physical description ==
Like all slow lorises, the tail of the Philippine slow loris is vestigial and it has a round head and short ears. It has a rhinarium (the moist, naked surface around the nostrils of the nose) and a broad, flat face with large eyes. On its front feet, the second digit is smaller than the rest; the big toe on its hind foot opposes the other toes, which enhances its gripping power. Its second toe on the hind foot has a curved grooming claw that the animal uses for scratching and grooming, while the other nails are straight. It also possesses a specialized arrangement of lower front teeth, called a toothcomb, which is also used for grooming, as with other lemuriform primates. It also has a small swelling on the ventral side of its elbow called the brachial gland, which secretes a pungent, clear oily toxin that the animal uses defensively by wiping it on its toothcomb.

The body weight of this species is typically in the range of 265–325 grams (9.3–11.5 oz), although weights of up to 700 grams (25 oz) have been recorded. The body length averages 274.2 mm (10.80 in), and its skull length ranges between 54.5 and 56.5 mm (2.15 and 2.22 in), roughly intermediate in size between the smaller pygmy slow loris and the larger Sunda slow loris. The slow lorises of Borneo are among the smallest of its genus, but this species can be distinguished from the others by its pale golden to red fur, low-contrast markings on its face and head, and the consistent lack of a second upper incisor. The rings around the eyes are either rounded or diffused-edged on top, while the bottom occasionally extends down below the zygomatic arch. The stripe between its eyes is narrow, the ears usually lack fur, the patch on the top of the head is mostly diffused, and the band of fur in front of the ears varies in width. In comparison to the other three species of slow lorises on Borneo, both N. menagensis and N. kayan have a pale body coloration, but this species has pale, very lightly-contrasting facial markings, with markedly less contrast than the dark, high-contrast face mask of N. kayan. Additionally, this species has short, unfluffed body hair, in contrast to the longer, fluffier body hair of N. kayan.

== Distribution ==
N. menagensis is found primarily in coastal and lowland areas in northern and eastern Borneo, in the provinces of Brunei, Sabah, and East Kalimantan. It is also found on the southern Philippine Islands, known as the Sulu Archipelago, and may be found on other nearby islands, such as the Banggi Island off Sabah. In the Sulu Archipelago, it occurs in the Tawi-Tawi Group, in the west of the archipelago, including the islands of Tawi-Tawi, Bongao, Sanga-Sanga, Simunul, and possibly other small islands. It does not occur on the island of Jolo or further to the east, as was claimed by one erroneous report from Mindanao. The species may be extinct on some Philippine islands, but is likely to persist on the smaller islands. Because the species is so popular as a pet, zoologists Guy Musser and Lawrence Heaney suggested in 1985 that the Philippine populations may have been introduced there by humans.

Of the four slow lorises living on Borneo, N. menagensis is believed to be partly sympatric with N. kayan only, with ranges that overlap in East Kalimantan and Sabah. Fossils of this species have been found in the Late Pleistocene site of Niah in Sarawak.

== Habitat and ecology ==
The slow lorises of Borneo are the least studied of Indonesia's slow lorises. In a field study at the Sabangau National Park in Central Kalimantan, only 12 slow loris sightings were made over a 75-day period. All were seen in the trees at heights of 15–20 m (49–66 ft). They were encountered singly, as mother and offspring, or in adult trios. Of the two trios, both were on fruiting trees, Calophyllum hosei and Syzygium cf. nigricans. In another survey conducted at Wehea Forest, East Kalimantan, only one Philippine slow loris—seen at a height of 30 m (98 ft)—was encountered in an area of more than 30 km^{2} (12 sq mi). Other surveys confirm that the animal is difficult to locate, and occurs in low densities.

The species occurs in primary and secondary lowland forest, gardens, and plantations, at elevations between 35–100 m (115–328 ft). Interviews conducted with Philippines locals indicate that it is commonly seen in citrus trees (calamansi), and may be tolerant of a variety of habitats. It is nocturnal, and almost entirely arboreal. Although data on diet is limited, based on cranial size and morphology, the Philippine slow loris is suspected to be one of the more insectivorous slow loris species. It has also been observed feeding on the gum from an unidentified liana (a long-stemmed woody vine).

== Conservation ==
In a 2005 report on the effect of logging on wildlife conservation in Indonesia, the authors claimed N. menagensis to be "common" throughout Borneo. However, as pointed out by Nekaris and colleagues, this assessment was based on field research data and historic museum specimens, and cannot be considered reliable, as "loris ‘presence’ is usually not determined first-hand, and it also cannot be presumed that lorises still occur in areas from where they were once collected." The species appears to be uncommon throughout its range, including a very limited distribution in the Philippines. Surveys have demonstrated that, compared to other slow loris species, the Philippine slow loris is rare, and sparsely distributed throughout its range.

N. menagensis is listed in CITES Appendix I, which prevents international commercial trade; it is also protected by Indonesian law. The species is often confused with other slow lorises in animal rescue centers, as it is not well-covered in field guides. The species occurs in a number of protected areas throughout its range, including some fragmented forests. Threats to the species include the illegal local exotic pet trade and habitat loss due to burning and conversion to palm oil plantations. Additionally, uncontrolled release of pets in some areas is also a threat to the species.

Prior to being split into four species in 2013, the Bornean slow loris species complex was among the least threatened of the slow lorises, and its situation was considered to be good due to its presence in a high percentage of "low risk" areas on Borneo. It was classified as "Vulnerable" by the IUCN, who consider there to have been a greater than 30% reduction in population between roughly 1984 and 2008, based on harvesting for the pet trade and extensive habitat loss. Because that species complex has been divided into four distinct species since the 2008 IUCN assessment, each of the new species likely faces a higher risk of extinction. Accordingly, each of them are expected to be listed as "Vulnerable" at the least, with some of them likely to be assigned to a higher-risk category.
