= Sanga Sanga =

Sanga Sanga could refer to:

- Sanga-Sanga, Kutai Kartanegara in East Kalimantan
- Sanga-Sanga (island), an island in the Philippines
- Sanga-Sanga Airport, and airport on Sanga Sanga island
