= Bongao Island =

Island in Tawi-Tawi, Philippines

- Location within Mindanao

Geography
- Coordinates: 5°1′14″N 119°45′12″E
- Adjacent to: Celebes Sea; Sulu Sea
- Area: 10.44 km^{2} (4.03 sq mi)

Administration
- Philippines
- Region: Bangsamoro
- Province: Tawi-Tawi
- Municipality: Bongao

Demographics
- Population: 75,076 (2020)
- Pop. density: 7,191/km^{2} (18625/sq mi)
- Ethnic groups: Sama

Additional information

Bongao Island is one of the islands of the Sulu Archipelago, a chain of islands between Mindanao and Borneo. Bongao Island is the town center of the municipality of Bongao, the capital of the province of Tawi-Tawi, the southernmost province of the Philippines.

Being the urban area of Bongao, it is the trading center of the whole province. Commercial centers, banks, schools, hospitals and government buildings are located in the island. The main seaport of the Tawi-Tawi is also situated in the island. But the island also has natural attractions, which includes many beach resorts and the imposing mountain at the center of the island, Bud Bongao, which overlooks the landscape.

== Barangays ==
10 out of Bongao's 35 barangays is situated in the island.

- Bongao Poblacion
- Lamion
- Nalil
- Pag-asa
- Pahut
- Pasiagan
- Simandagit
- Tubig-Boh
- Tubig-Mampallam
- Tubig Tanah

== Geography ==
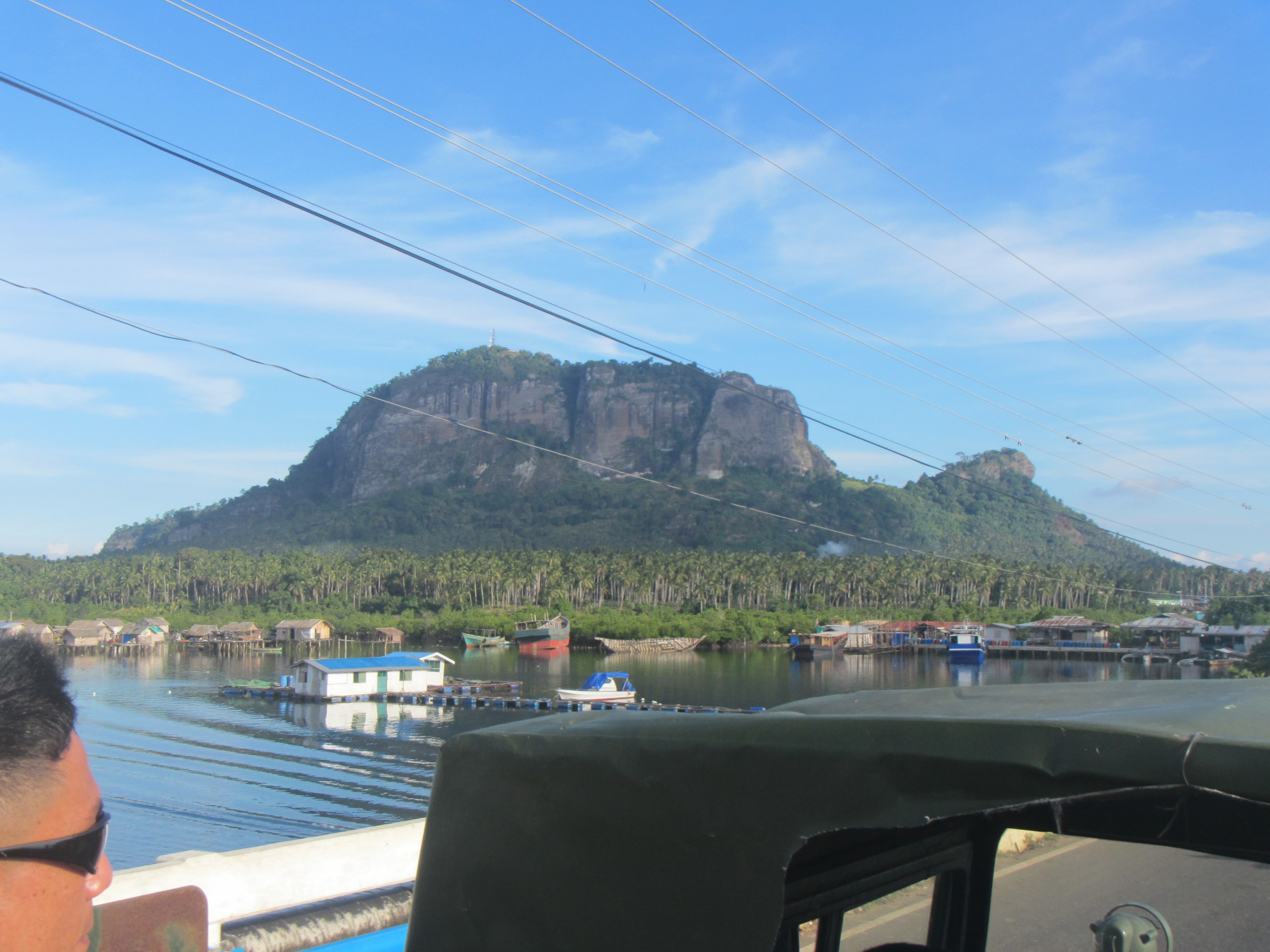
Bud Bongao, the mountain in Bongao Island

The total land area of Bongao Island is approximately 10.44 square kilometers (4.03 sq mi). Directly north of the island is the island of Sanga-Sanga and its northeast is Pababag island. Both islands are still part of the municipality of Bongao. The island is around 58 kilometers (36 mi) from Sabah, Malaysia, much nearer than Jolo or Zamboanga.

== Demographics ==
According to the latest 2020 census, Bongao Island's total number of residents is 75,076.

This table shows the population of the island's barangays.

| Barangay | Population (2020) |
|---|---|
| Bongao Poblacion | 15,462 |
| Lamion | 8,296 |
| Nalil | 5,487 |
| Pag-asa | 7,891 |
| Pahut | 1,874 |
| Pasiagan | 3,786 |
| Simandagit | 8,741 |
| Tubig-Boh | 8,664 |
| Tubig-Mampallam | 6,211 |
| Tubig Tanah | 8,664 |
| Total | 75,076 |

Residents of the island practice Islam and are part of the ethnic group, Sama. But since the Bongao is the capital of commerce, it also has Christians and other groups such as Tausug, Yakan and Bisaya.

== Transport ==
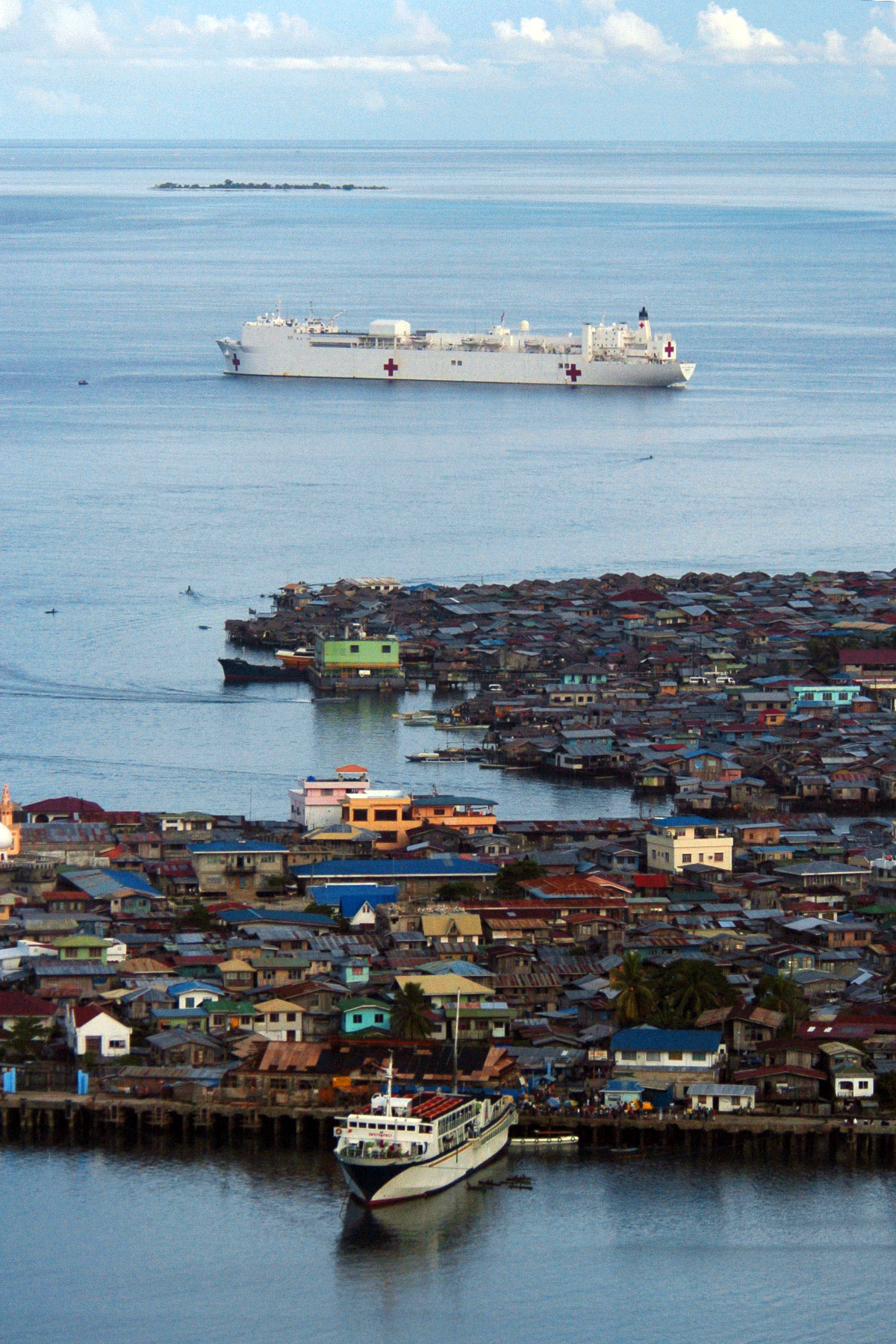
Aerial Shot of the seaport of Bongao

There are regular flights from Zamboanga and Cotabato through Sanga-Sanga Airport located in the adjacent island of Sanga-Sanga. There are also scheduled boat trips from Zamboanga and Jolo to Bongao.

== See also ==
- List of islands by population density
- List of islands of the Philippines
