= Mount Bongao =

Mountain in Bongao Island, Tawi-Tawi, Philippines

- Bud Bongao
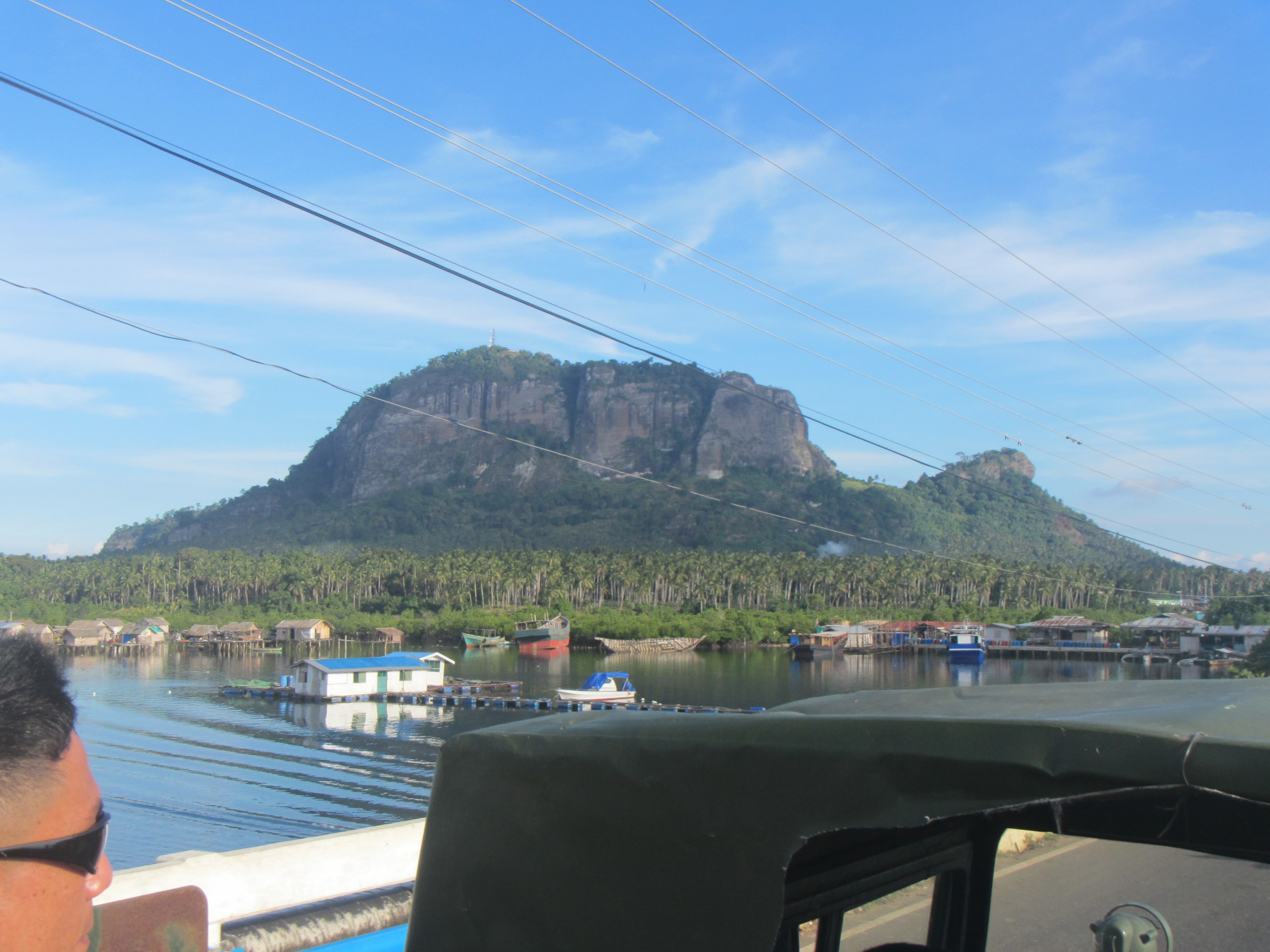
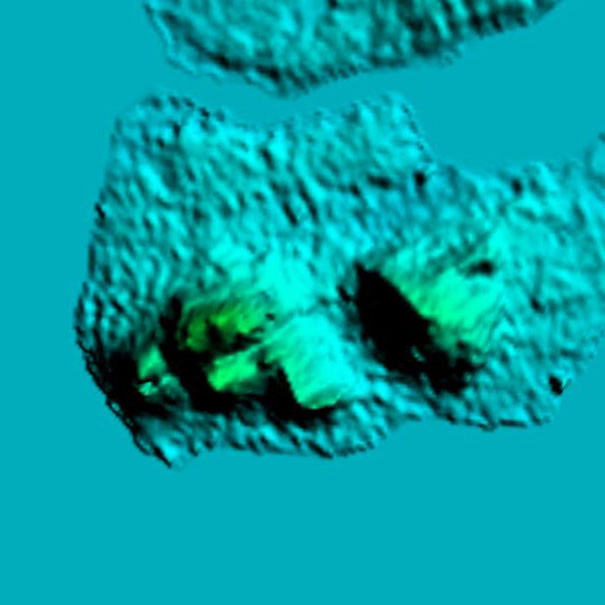
- Relief map

Highest point
- Elevation: 342 m (1,122 ft)
- Prominence: 342 m (1,122 ft)
- Coordinates: 5°01′07″N 119°44′52″E

Naming
- Native name: Bud Bongao (Sama)

Geography
- Location within Mindanao Location within Philippines
- Country: Philippines
- Region: Bangsamoro Autonomous Region in Muslim Mindanao
- Province: Tawi-Tawi
- City/municipality: Bongao

Climbing
- Easiest route: Barangay Pasiagan

Mount Bongao (famously known as Bud Bongao) is a mountain located on Bongao Island in the province of Tawi-Tawi. It is a mountain formed with six limestone pillars that serves as its six peaks. It is the Philippines' southernmost peak.

Bud Bongao is inside the Bongao Peak Eco-Tourism Park that was inaugurated on July 3, 2017. It is a 250-hectare forest that is one of the last remaining moist forests in the Sulu Archipelago.

The mountain is of spiritual and traditional importance to the indigenous Sama Dilaut people. The mountain is also considered sacred where it is believed that two Islamic preachers who were direct followers of Karim ul-Makhdum, are buried under what is called Tampat Rocks, although the site was already sacred even before Islam arrived. Karim ul-Makhdum brought Islam to the Philippines in the year 1380.

== Physical characteristics ==
Bud Bongao is composed of six limestone pillars that form six of its peaks, which serves as view points for the islands and locations they are named after. These peaks are Bongao, Pajar, Sibutu (summit), Simunul, Tambisan, and Tinondakan.

== Biodiversity ==
Mount Bongao hosts one of the last remaining moist forests in the Sulu Archipelago.

Monkeys endemic to Bud Bongao include Macaca fascicularis. The red dragonfly, orange albatross, mangrove blue flycatcher, Philippine pitta are found on the mountain. Bongao and its surrounding islands—Sanga-Sanga, Simunul, Tawi-Tawi—are also home to the vulnerable Tawi-Tawi forest rat and the Philippine slow loris. The jungle flycatcher was once observed in 1973.

== Hiking activity ==
Aside from being a sacred mountain, Bud Bongao is also famous for hikers. A 3,608-step cobblestone trail has been constructed from the jump-off at Barangay Pasiagan that ends at a view deck constructed on Tambisan Peak. The view deck offers a vantage point overlooking Celebes Sea and Tambisan Island in Sabah at 317 metres (1,040 ft) above sea level.

== See also ==
- Sacred mountains
- Sheik Karimol Makhdum Mosque
- Islam in the Philippines
