= Tawi-Tawi's 2nd parliamentary district =

Parliamentary district for the Bangsamoro Parliament

- Constituency for the Bangsamoro Parliament
- Boundary of Tawi-Tawi's 2nd parliamentary district in Tawi-Tawi
- Province: Tawi-Tawi
- Population: 126,186 (2024)
- Electorate: 59,602 (2026)

Current constituency
- Member of Parliament: Hadjimar Matba (elect)
- Political party: PBP

Tawi-Tawi's 2nd parliamentary district is the second of the four parliamentary districts of the province of Tawi-Tawi for the Bangsamoro Parliament. It is composed of the municipalities of Languyan, Panglima Sugala, and South Ubian.

Hadjimar Matba of the Progresibong Bangsamoro Party is the member of Parliament-elect for the district following the inaugural 2026 Bangsamoro Parliament election. He will assume office on October 30, 2026.

== List of MPs representing the district ==
| No. | Portrait | Member (Lifespan) | Term of office | Party | Parliament | Electoral history | Constituencies |
|---|---|---|---|---|---|---|---|
| 1 | | Hadjimar Matba (born 1988) | Assuming office on October 30, 2026 | PBP | 1st Parliament | Elected in 2026. | 2026–present Languyan, Panglima Sugala, South Ubian |

== Election results ==
=== 2026 ===
2026 Bangsamoro Parliament election in Tawi-Tawi
| Party | Candidate | Votes | % |
|---|---|---|---|
| PRO Bangsamoro | Hadjimar Matba | 38,545 | 69.41 |
| BGC | Gamal Hayudini | 14,255 | 25.67 |
| UBJP | Aziz Halun | 2,732 | 4.92 |
| Total votes | | 55,532 | 100.00 |
| PRO Bangsamoro win (new seat) | | | |
