= Tandubato =

Island barangay in Tawi-Tawi, Philippines

Tandubato is an island-barangay in Tandubas, Philippines, one of the smaller islands of the Tawi-Tawi group, of the Sulu Archipelago. It lies off the northeast coast of the island of Tawi-Tawi; length, north and south, six miles; greatest width, five miles. The island is mountainous, Tandubato peak being the highest point.
