= Balobok Cave =

Cave and archaeological site in Tawi-Tawi, Philippines

- Balobok Rock Shelter
- Location: Bongao, Tawi-Tawi, Philippines
- Type: Settlement

History
- Built: c. 8,000–5,000 years ago

The Balobok Cave or the Balobok Rock Shelter is a cave and archaeological site in Lakit-Lakit, Bongao, Tawi-Tawi in the Philippines.

The cave housed one of the oldest human settlements in Southeast Asia which dated 8,000 to 5,000 years ago. It served as a shelter of the Moro National Liberation Front (MNLF) in the 1970s.

It is recognized as an Important Cultural Property in 2016. In 2022, a bill was filed in the Bangsamoro Parliament which proposed that the Bangsamoro regional government recognize the area as a heritage zone.
