= Tandubas =

Municipality in Tawi-Tawi, Philippines

Tandubas تندوبس
- Municipality
- Municipality of Tandubas
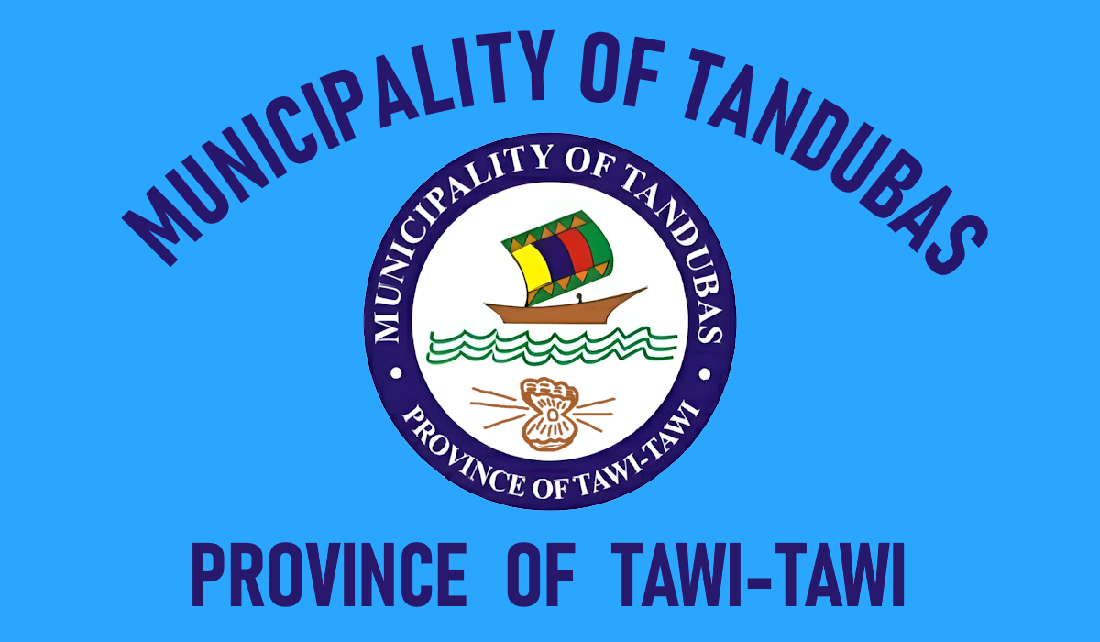
- Flag Seal

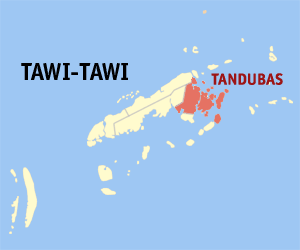
- Map of Tawi-Tawi with Tandubas highlighted
- Interactive map of Tandubas
- Location within the Philippines
- Coordinates: 5°08′06″N 120°20′46″E
- Country: Philippines
- Region: Bangsamoro Autonomous Region in Muslim Mindanao
- Province: Tawi-Tawi
- House district: Lone district
- Parliamentary district: 3rd district
- Founded: July 1, 1958
- Barangays: 20 (see Barangays)

Government
  - Type: Sangguniang Bayan
  - Mayor: Al-Shalid A. Salih
  - Vice Mayor: Rahiema A. Salih
  - House Representative: Dimszar M. Sali
  - Municipal Council: Members: Wannur M. Atara; Nur J. Anual; Hja Aida T. Utunain; Arwin K. Chio; Alnahada S. Dalagan; Ferhana N. Matolo; Alkadi T. Antam; Almurad B. Salih
  - Electorate: 15,405 voters (2025)

Area
  - Total: 552.05 km^{2} (213.15 sq mi)
- Elevation: 8.0 m (26.2 ft)
- Highest elevation: 360 m (1,180 ft)
- Lowest elevation: 0 m (0 ft)

Population (2024 census)
  - Total: 34,702
  - Density: 62.860/km^{2} (162.81/sq mi)
  - Households: 5,649

Economy
  - Income class: 1st municipal income class
  - Poverty incidence: 61.33% (2023)
  - Revenue: ₱ 266.9 million (2024)
  - Assets: ₱ 303.9 million (2024)
  - Expenditure: ₱ 167.1 million (2024)
  - Liabilities: ₱ 0.06379 million (2024)

Service provider
  - Electricity: Tawi Tawi Electric Cooperative (TAWELCO)
- Time zone: UTC+8 (PST)
- ZIP code: 7502
- PSGC: 1907007000
- IDD : area code: +63 (0)68
- Native languages: Sama; Tagalog
- Website: www.tandubas.gov.ph

Tandubas, officially the Municipality of Tandubas (Tagalog: Bayan ng Tandubas), is a municipality in the province of Tawi-Tawi, Philippines. According to the 2024 census, it has a population of 34,702 people.

== Etymology ==
The word Tandubas coined from two Malay words Tanjung Bas. Tanjung means “place”, while the word Bas means “Landing”. Therefore, Tandubas means a place of landing, referring to a group of Malaysian traders who sailed across many islands and landed on an island what is now Tandubas Island. Seeing the abundance of resources to sustain their living, this group of Malaysian traders finally decided to settle on that island and named it as Tanjung Bas.

For many years, the island had been named as Tanjung Bas. The Malaysian word Tanjung has its equivalent in Sama dialect which is Tandu. The name Tanjungbas has been changed by the natives to Tandubas, a name that was used from generation to generation.

== History ==
Tandubas had been a part of the Sultanate of Sulu prior to the creation of Sulu as a province under the Republic of the Philippines. When the province of Sulu was created, Tandubas was one of the Districts, an administrative sub-division of the then Department of Education under the Division of Sulu. By virtue of Executive Order No. 355, dated July 1, 1958, Tandubas was converted to a Municipality under the Province of Sulu, covering areas now under the municipality of Sapa-Sapa, the municipality of Languyan, an area in the mainland of Tawi-Tawi. When the Province of Tawi-Tawi was created by virtue of Presidential Decree No. 302, dated September 27, 1973, the Municipality of Tandubas became one of the municipalities in the Province of Tawi-Tawi.

By 2008, the municipality celebrated its Golden Anniversary. In a bid to create more local government units that comprise the Province of Tawi-Tawi, the Municipality of Sapa-Sapa was created entirely from Tandubas Municipality. Also the Municipality of Languyan was created partly out of the territorial jurisdiction of the Municipality of Tandubas, thus greatly reducing the land area of the mother municipality. This was made possible by virtue of Presidential Decree No. 1086.

== Geography ==
The Municipality of Tandubas is located in the north-eastern part of the province of Tawi-Tawi. It is bounded in the north by Languyan Municipality and Sulu Sea; south by Celebes Sea; east by Municipality of South Ubian: and west by Municipality of Sapa-Sapa.

The municipality is approximately 63 kilometres (39 mi) away from the Municipality of Bongao, the capital town of Tawi-Tawi. From Bongao it is accessible by water transportation. Travel time from the port of Bongao to the Municipality of Tandubas takes about five (5) hours using a motor launch with an average speed. For a speedboat or a fast craft it will only take about an hour.

=== Barangays ===
Tandubas is politically subdivided into 20 barangays. Each barangay consists of puroks while some have sitios.

- Baliungan - M
- Kakoong
- Kepeng
- Lahay-lahay
- Naungan
- Sallangan heya & sallangan diki
- Sapa
- Silantup
- Tapian
- Tongbangkaw
- Tangngah (Tangngah Ungus matata)
- Ballak
- Butun
- Himbah - M
- Kalang-kalang
- Salamat
- Sibakloon
- Tandubato
- Tapian Sukah
- Taruk

12 barangays are located on the island of Tandubas (Tongbangkaw, Tapian, Ballak, Kakoong, Tangngah, Silantup, Butun, Kepeng, Sallangan, Tapian Sokah, Sibakloon and Sapa); 2 barangays are located on Tingungun Island (Kalang-kalang and Salamat); 1 barangay is located at Naungan Island (barangay Naungan); 2 barangays are located on Tandubato island (Lahay-Lahay and Tandubato); 2 barangays are located on Tawitawi Island (Himba and Baliongan; marked by an "M"), and 1 barangay located on Taruk Island (Barangay Taruk).

=== Climate ===
Climate data for Tandubas, Tawi-Tawi
Month	Jan	Feb	Mar	Apr	May	Jun	Jul	Aug	Sep	Oct	Nov	Dec	Year
Mean daily maximum °C (°F)	29 (84)	29 (84)	29 (84)	30 (86)	30 (86)	30 (86)	29 (84)	30 (86)	30 (86)	30 (86)	29 (84)	29 (84)	30 (85)
Mean daily minimum °C (°F)	25 (77)	24 (75)	24 (75)	25 (77)	25 (77)	25 (77)	25 (77)	25 (77)	25 (77)	25 (77)	25 (77)	25 (77)	25 (77)
Average precipitation mm (inches)	157 (6.2)	115 (4.5)	123 (4.8)	96 (3.8)	136 (5.4)	120 (4.7)	104 (4.1)	89 (3.5)	86 (3.4)	131 (5.2)	151 (5.9)	159 (6.3)	1,467 (57.8)
Average rainy days	20.4	17.5	20.4	21.1	26.7	25.7	26.0	24.5	24.0	27.7	26.3	24.7	285
Source: Meteoblue

== Demographics ==
Population census of Tandubas
Year	Pop.	±% p.a.
1903	3,510	—
1918	9,080	+6.54%
1939	11,342	+1.06%
1948	15,089	+3.22%
1960	20,038	+2.39%
1970	27,069	+3.05%
1975	37,421	+6.71%
1980	19,968	−11.80%
1990	19,505	−0.23%
1995	20,646	+1.07%
2000	24,900	+4.10%
2007	33,037	+3.98%
2010	27,748	−6.15%
2015	29,390	+1.10%
2020	34,316	+3.32%
2024	34,702	+0.27%
Source: Philippine Statistics Authority

== Economy ==
Poverty Incidence of Tandubas

Source: Philippine Statistics Authority
