= Tawi-Tawi Island =

Island in the Sulu Archipelago

Tawitawi
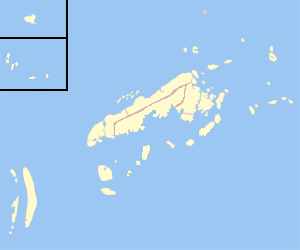
- Tawi-Tawi province map showing Tawi-Tawi Island and smaller outlying islands

- Location within Philippines

Geography
- Coordinates: 05°12′N 120°00′E
- Archipelago: Sulu Archipelago
- Adjacent to: Celebes Sea; Sulu Sea
- Area: 580.5 km^{2} (224.1 sq mi)
- Length: 55 km (34.2 mi)
- Width: 23 km (14.3 mi)
- Coastline: 152.2 km (94.57 mi)
- Highest elevation: 552 m (1811 ft)
- Highest point: Mount Sibangkat

Administration
- Philippines
- Region: BARMM
- Province: Tawi-Tawi
- Municipalities: Bongao; Languyan; Panglima Sugala; Tandubas
- Largest settlement: Bongao (pop. 116,118)

Demographics
- Population: 82,582 (2010)
- Pop. density: 142.3/km^{2} (368.6/sq mi)

Additional information

Tawitawi Island (also spelled Tawi Tawi or Tawi-Tawi) is a Philippine island in the Sulu Archipelago between the Sulu Sea and Celebes Sea, about 64 kilometres (40 mi; 35 nmi) east of Borneo. It is the main island of Tawi-Tawi Province, with a little more than half the province's 1,087.40 km^{2} (419.85 sq mi) land area.

Tawitawi has an area of 580.5 square kilometres (224.1 sq mi), making it the 21st-largest island of the Philippines, and the third-largest island in the Sulu Archipelago (after Basilan and Jolo). It has a shoreline length of 152.2 kilometres (94.6 mi), and a maximum elevation of 549 metres (1,801 ft).

Tawitawi Island is of volcanic origin and irregular in shape, about 55 kilometres (34 mi) long and between 10 and 23 kilometres (6.2 and 14.3 mi) wide. It is hilly and heavily wooded, with both white sandy beaches and rocky coasts.

The island is subdivided into four municipalities (Bongao, Languyan, Panglima Sugala, and Tandubas). The inhabitants are mostly Sama people, speaking Sama–Bajaw languages and of Muslim conviction.
