= Sanga-Sanga Airport =

Class 1 principal domestic airport in the Philippines serving tawi-tawi

Sanga-Sanga Airport Lapagan sin Sanga-Sanga Paliparan ng Sanga-Sanga
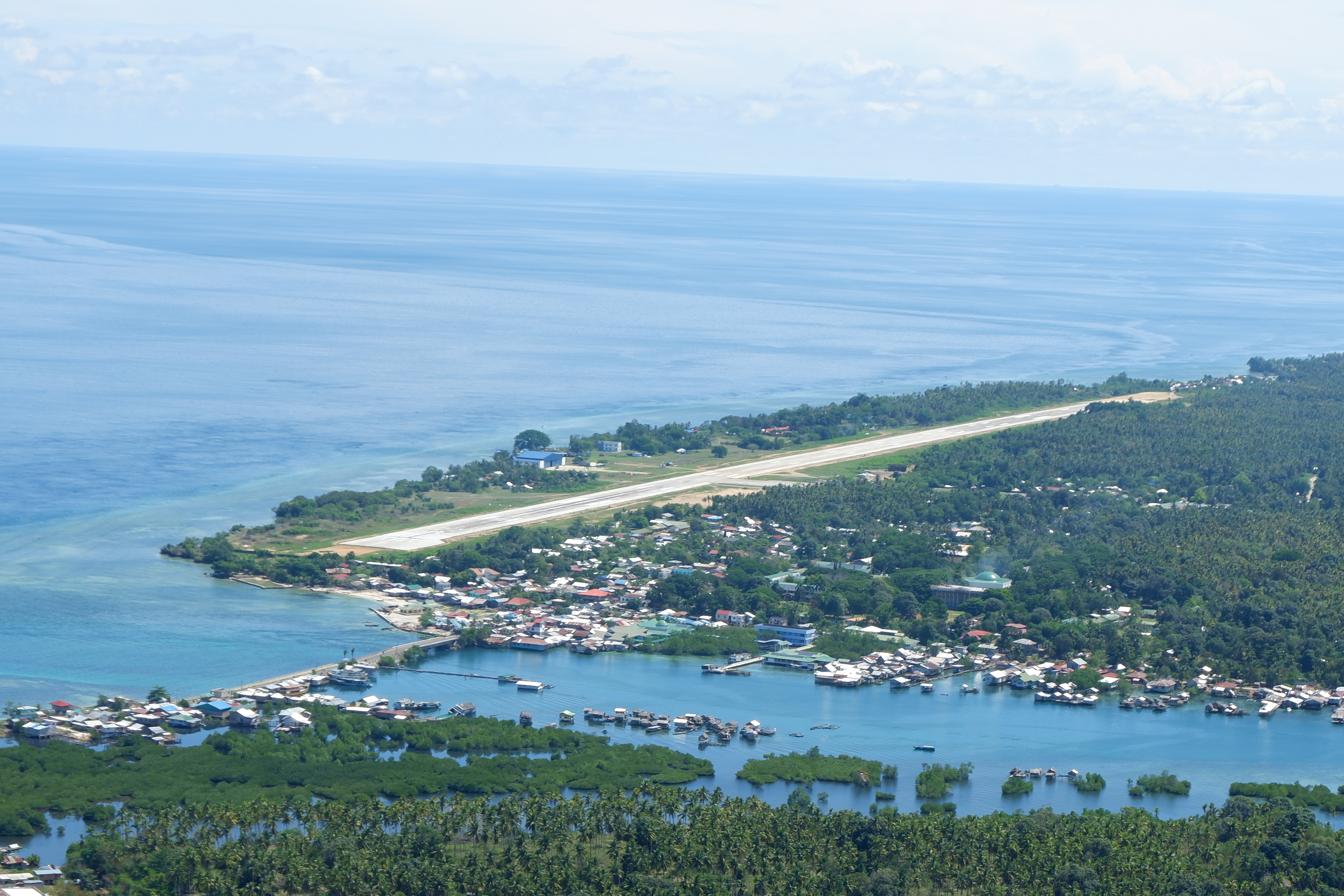
- A view of Sanga-Sanga Airport from the peak of Mount Bongao.
- IATA: TWT; ICAO: RPMN

Summary
- Airport type: Public
- Owner/Operator: Civil Aviation Authority of the Philippines (airside and landside); Bangsamoro Airport Authority (landside)
- Serves: Tawi-Tawi
- Location: Sanga-Sanga, Bongao, Tawi-Tawi, Philippines
- Elevation AMSL: 2 m (6.6 ft)
- Coordinates: 05°02′49″N 119°44′34″E

Map
- Location within Mindanao Location within Philippines

Runways
Direction	Length		Surface
Direction	m	ft	Surface
02/20	1,860	6,102	Concrete

Statistics (2022)
- Passengers: 106,711
- Aircraft movements: 868
- Metric tonnes of cargo: 257,931
- Statistics from the Air Transportation Office.

Sanga-Sanga Airport (IATA: TWT, ICAO: RPMN), also known as Tawi-Tawi Airport, is an airport serving the general area of Bongao, the capital of the province of Tawi-Tawi in the Philippines. The airport is classified as a Class 2 principal (minor domestic) airport by the Civil Aviation Authority of the Philippines. It is not an international airport, contrary to its classification by the Tawi-Tawi provincial government. It is located in Sanga-Sanga Island. The airport was formerly referred by the IATA with the code SGS until the end of 2011, when its IATA code was finally changed to TWT.

In 2005, the runway was extended to 1,860 meters through partnerships between the Department of Transportation and Communications (DOTC, today the DOTr), the CAAP, the United States Agency for International Development (USAID), the regional government of the Autonomous Region in Muslim Mindanao and the Tawi-Tawi provincial government. In addition, the runway has been widened to 30 meters. Along with the expansion of Jolo Airport in Sulu, the expansion of the runway was completed in August 2009.

The new runway was officially inaugurated on August 17, 2009 by US ambassador Kristie Kenney and local officials in Tawi-Tawi.

In 2015, the DOTC allotted Php248 million to jumpstart the renovation of the Sanga-Sanga Airport and an additional Php10 million for the fencing requirement expenses of the Cagayan de Sulu Airport in the Municipality of Mapun, Tawi-Tawi. The DOTC was also to release another Php577 million by January 2016 to finance the further improvement and development of the Sanga-Sanga Airport.

== Airlines and destinations ==
Cebu Pacific operates daily flights to Tawi-Tawi from Zamboanga and vice versa, utilizing the Airbus A320 aircraft. PAL Express also operates 3x weekly flights on the same route sector, also deploying the Airbus A320 aircraft.

Airlines	Destinations
Cebu Pacific	Zamboanga
PAL Express	Cotabato, Zamboanga
Platinum Skies	Zamboanga

== See also ==
- List of airports in the Philippines
