= South Ubian =

Municipality in Tawi-Tawi, Philippines

South Ubian اوبيان سلتن
- Municipality
- Municipality of South Ubian
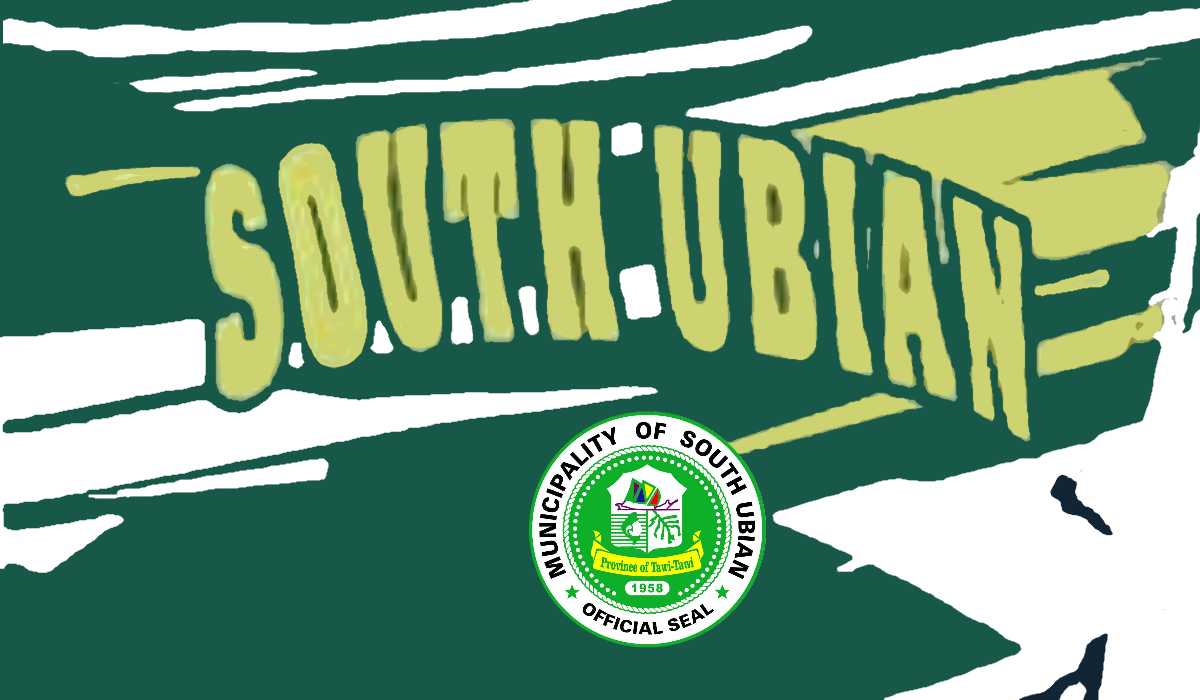
- Flag Seal

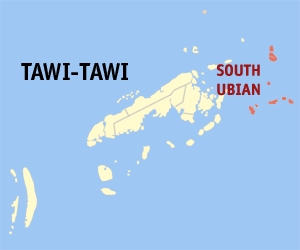
- Map of Tawi-Tawi with South Ubian highlighted
- Interactive map of South Ubian
- Location within the Philippines
- Coordinates: 5°11′N 120°29′E
- Country: Philippines
- Region: Bangsamoro Autonomous Region in Muslim Mindanao
- Province: Tawi-Tawi
- House district: Lone district
- Parliamentary district: 2nd district
- Barangays: 31 (see Barangays)

Government
  - Type: Sangguniang Bayan
  - Mayor: Hadzri H. Matba
  - Vice Mayor: Abdel-Aziz A. Halun
  - House Representative: Dimszar M. Sali
  - Municipal Council: Members: Rudy Mar T. Shun; Mohammadjan N. Sarajan III; Kasuwagi G. Tani; Nurmudzrin U. Hashim; Meriba K. Sandag; Adzter B. Tani; Alyasier A. Escandar; Munar Khan S. Maming
  - Electorate: 15,199 voters (2025)

Area
  - Total: 272.04 km^{2} (105.04 sq mi)
- Elevation: 2.0 m (6.6 ft)
- Highest elevation: 490 m (1,610 ft)
- Lowest elevation: 0 m (0 ft)

Population (2024 census)
  - Total: 31,942
  - Density: 117.42/km^{2} (304.11/sq mi)
  - Households: 5,382

Economy
  - Income class: 2nd municipal income class
  - Poverty incidence: 27.61% (2023)
  - Revenue: ₱ 185.4 million (2024)
  - Assets: ₱ 103.9 million (2024)
  - Expenditure: ₱ 164.3 million (2024)
  - Liabilities: ₱ 21.22 million (2024)

Service provider
  - Electricity: Tawi Tawi Electric Cooperative (TAWELCO)
- Time zone: UTC+8 (PST)
- ZIP code: 7504
- PSGC: 1907006000
- IDD : area code: +63 (0)68
- Native languages: Sama; Tagalog
- Website: www.southubian.gov.ph

South Ubian, officially the Municipality of South Ubian (Tagalog: Bayan ng Timog Ubian), is a municipality in the province of Tawi-Tawi, Philippines. According to the 2024 census, it has a population of 31,942 people.

The municipality is home to the sacred island-village of Tabawan, which is currently being enlisted by the UNESCO National Commission of the Philippines in the country's tentative list for future UNESCO World Heritage Site inscription.

A number of tangible and intangible properties in the municipality, mostly in Tabawan, was declared by Ordinance No. 14-2020, effectively protecting these cultural heritage or "pusaka’ kambo’an" in the Sama language. Properties protected include numerous ancestral heritage houses in Tabawan as well as numerous cultural practices of intangible heritage.

== Geography ==
=== Barangays ===
South Ubian is politically subdivided into 31 barangays. Each barangay consists of puroks while some have sitios.

- Babagan
- Bengkol
- Bintawlan
- Boheh
- Bubuan
- Bunay Bunay Tong
- Bunay Bunay Lookan
- Bunay Bunay Center
- Lahad Dampong
- East Talisay
- Laitan
- Lambi-lambian
- Laud
- Likud Dampong
- Likud Egang
- Nunuk
- Nusa-nusa
- Nusa
- Pampang
- Putat
- Sollogan
- Tampakan Dampong
- Tangngah
- Tinda-tindahan
- Tong Tampakan
- Tubig Dayang Center
- Tubig Dayang Riverside
- Tubig Dayang
- Tukkai
- West Talisay
- Unas-unas

=== Climate ===
Climate data for South Ubian, Tawi-Tawi
Month	Jan	Feb	Mar	Apr	May	Jun	Jul	Aug	Sep	Oct	Nov	Dec	Year
Mean daily maximum °C (°F)	29 (84)	29 (84)	29 (84)	30 (86)	30 (86)	30 (86)	29 (84)	30 (86)	30 (86)	30 (86)	29 (84)	29 (84)	30 (85)
Mean daily minimum °C (°F)	25 (77)	24 (75)	24 (75)	25 (77)	25 (77)	25 (77)	25 (77)	25 (77)	25 (77)	25 (77)	25 (77)	25 (77)	25 (77)
Average precipitation mm (inches)	157 (6.2)	115 (4.5)	123 (4.8)	96 (3.8)	136 (5.4)	120 (4.7)	104 (4.1)	89 (3.5)	86 (3.4)	131 (5.2)	151 (5.9)	159 (6.3)	1,467 (57.8)
Average rainy days	20.4	17.5	20.4	21.1	26.7	25.7	26.0	24.5	24.0	27.7	26.3	24.7	285
Source: Meteoblue

== Demographics ==
Population census of South Ubian
Year	Pop.	±% p.a.
1903	6,410	—
1918	8,944	+2.25%
1939	8,052	−0.50%
1948	10,286	+2.76%
1960	11,308	+0.79%
1970	12,749	+1.21%
1975	16,241	+4.97%
1980	17,356	+1.34%
1990	19,191	+1.01%
1995	20,180	+0.95%
2000	27,301	+6.69%
2007	32,986	+2.64%
2010	27,741	−6.11%
2015	25,935	−1.27%
2020	29,583	+2.81%
2024	31,942	+1.86%
Source: Philippine Statistics Authority

== Economy ==
Poverty Incidence of South Ubian

Source: Philippine Statistics Authority
