= Sanga-Sanga =

Island of the Philippines

- Location within Philippines

Geography
- Coordinates: 5°4′21″N 119°47′7″E
- Archipelago: Sulu Archipelago
- Adjacent to: Celebes Sea; Sulu Sea

Administration
- Philippines
- Region: Bangsamoro Autonomous Region in Muslim Mindanao
- Province: Tawi-Tawi
- Municipality: Bongao

Demographics
- Population: 17,212 (2010)

Sanga-Sanga is an island of the Celebes Sea in the southwestern Philippines, bordered to nordwest by the Sulu Sea. The island is part of the Sulu Archipelago. It is sandwiched between Tawi-Tawi Island to the east and Bongao Island to the south.

The island is subdivided into 11 barangays (Karungdong, Lakit-Lakit, Lato-Lato, Luuk Pandan, Malassa, Mandulan, Pagasinan, Pakias, Paniongan, Sanga-Sanga, and Tubig Basag), all belonging to the municipality of Bongao in the province of Tawi-Tawi.

== History ==
During World War II the island was a major stopover for the Japanese Navy. It was liberated by American forces on 2 April 1945, and used by American and Australian forces.

== Transportation ==
Sanga-Sanga Airport, the main airport serving Tawi-Tawi province, is located on the island.
