= Panglima Sugala =

Municipality in Tawi-Tawi, Philippines

Panglima Sugala فَڠْلِمَ سُݢَلَ Balimbing
- Municipality
- Municipality of Panglima Sugala
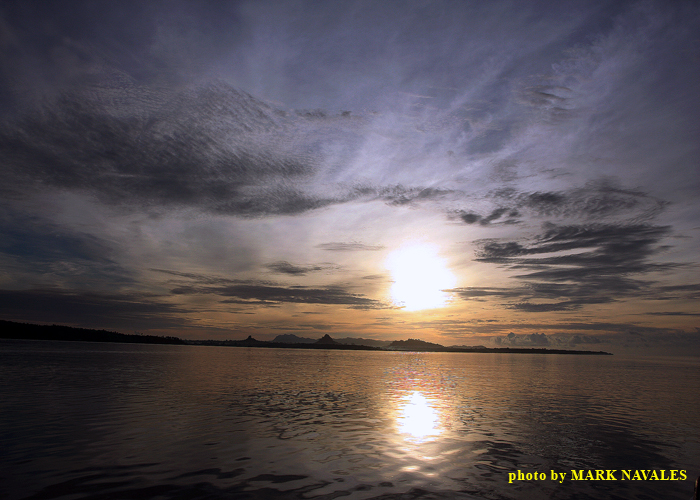
- Sunrise view of the sea at Panglima Sugala

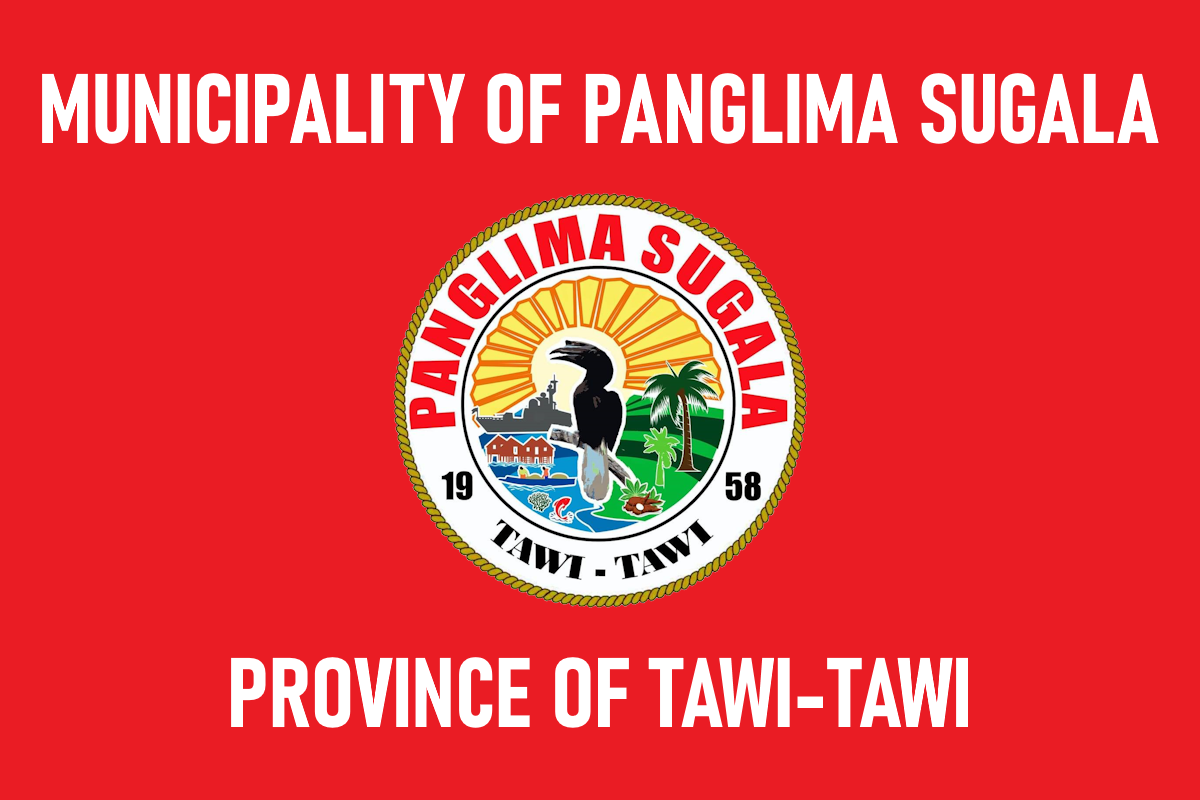
- Flag

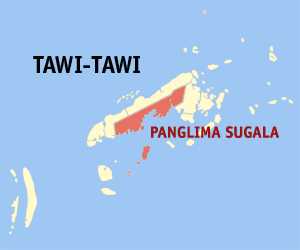
- Map of Tawi-Tawi with Panglima Sugala highlighted
- Interactive map of Panglima Sugala
- Location within the Philippines
- Coordinates: 5°04′22″N 119°53′05″E
- Country: Philippines
- Region: Bangsamoro Autonomous Region in Muslim Mindanao
- Province: Tawi-Tawi
- House district: Lone district
- Parliamentary district: 2nd district
- Barangays: 17 (see Barangays)

Government
  - Type: Sangguniang Bayan
  - Mayor: Nurbert M. Sahali
  - Vice Mayor: Dayang Iman M. Sahali
  - House Representative: Dimszar M. Sali
  - Municipal Council: Members: Abdurajik J. Saiyari; Nasser A. Dammang; Sabrine S. Jilhano; Abdulyaser H. Bairulla; Shelma S. Bahatul; Albie U. Sammani; Sawadjaan U. Jaji; Saib I. Abdulpatta
  - Electorate: 19,493 voters (2025)

Area
  - Total: 416.66 km^{2} (160.87 sq mi)
- Elevation: 5.0 m (16.4 ft)
- Highest elevation: 539 m (1,768 ft)
- Lowest elevation: 0 m (0 ft)

Population (2024 census)
  - Total: 52,657
  - Density: 126.38/km^{2} (327.32/sq mi)
  - Households: 7,546

Economy
  - Income class: 1st municipal income class
  - Poverty incidence: 49.33% (2023)
  - Revenue: ₱ 265.8 million (2024)
  - Assets: ₱ 436.4 million (2024)
  - Expenditure: ₱ 266.8 million (2024)
  - Liabilities: ₱ 86.45 million (2024)

Service provider
  - Electricity: Tawi Tawi Electric Cooperative (TAWELCO)
- Time zone: UTC+8 (PST)
- ZIP code: 7501
- PSGC: 1907001000
- IDD : area code: +63 (0)68
- Native languages: Sama; Tagalog; Sabah Malay
- Website: www.panglimasugala.gov.ph

Panglima Sugala, officially the Municipality of Panglima Sugala (Filipino: Bayan ng Panglima Sugala), is a municipality in the province of Tawi-Tawi, Philippines. According to the 2024 census, it has a population of 52,657 people. It was formerly known as Balimbing.

The municipality's barangay Batu-batu was once the provincial capital of Tawi-Tawi until it was transferred in the municipality of Bongao in 1979.

The municipality was renamed from Balimbing to Panglima Sugala as per Muslim Mindanao Autonomy Act No. 7, enacted on July 4, 1991, and approved by the Regional Governor on September 9, 1991.

== Geography ==
=== Barangays ===
Panglima Sugala is politically subdivided into 17 barangays. Each barangay consists of puroks while some have sitios.

- Balimbing Proper
- Batu-batu (Bato-Bato) (poblacion)
- Bauno Garing
- Belatan Halo
- Buan
- Dungon
- Karaha
- Kulape
- Liyaburan
- Luuk Buntal
- Magsaggaw
- Malacca
- Parangan
- Sumangday
- Tabunan
- Tundon
- Tungbangkaw

=== Climate ===
Climate data for Panglima Sugala, Tawi-Tawi
Month	Jan	Feb	Mar	Apr	May	Jun	Jul	Aug	Sep	Oct	Nov	Dec	Year
Mean daily maximum °C (°F)	29 (84)	29 (84)	29 (84)	30 (86)	30 (86)	30 (86)	29 (84)	30 (86)	30 (86)	30 (86)	29 (84)	29 (84)	30 (85)
Mean daily minimum °C (°F)	25 (77)	24 (75)	24 (75)	25 (77)	25 (77)	25 (77)	25 (77)	25 (77)	25 (77)	25 (77)	25 (77)	25 (77)	25 (77)
Average precipitation mm (inches)	157 (6.2)	115 (4.5)	123 (4.8)	96 (3.8)	136 (5.4)	120 (4.7)	104 (4.1)	89 (3.5)	86 (3.4)	131 (5.2)	151 (5.9)	159 (6.3)	1,467 (57.8)
Average rainy days	20.4	17.5	20.4	21.1	26.7	25.7	26.0	24.5	24.0	27.7	26.3	24.7	285
Source: Meteoblue

== Demographics ==
Population census of Panglima Sugala
Year	Pop.	±% p.a.
1903	169	—
1918	4,783	+24.96%
1939	3,222	−1.86%
1948	3,616	+1.29%
1960	5,753	+3.94%
1970	10,556	+6.25%
1975	17,290	+10.40%
1980	22,189	+5.11%
1990	20,767	−0.66%
1995	24,398	+3.07%
2000	33,315	+6.91%
2007	50,504	+5.91%
2010	38,704	−9.23%
2015	44,184	+2.55%
2020	48,055	+1.78%
2024	52,657	+2.22%
Source: Philippine Statistics Authority

== Economy ==
Poverty Incidence of Panglima Sugala

Source: Philippine Statistics Authority

== See also ==
- List of renamed cities and municipalities in the Philippines
