= Languyan =

Municipality in Tawi-Tawi, Philippines

Languyan لاڠوين
- Municipality
- Municipality of Languyan
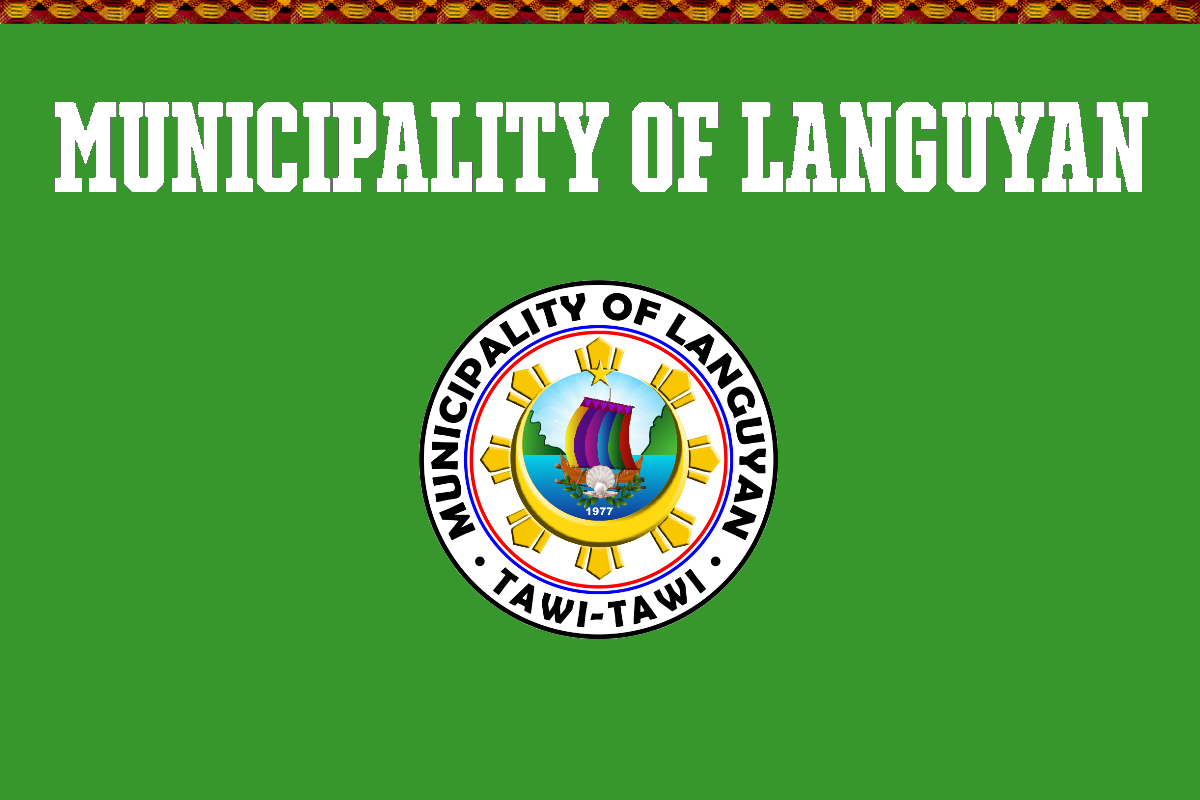
- Flag
- Nickname: Tawi-Tawi's North Coast
- Interactive map of Languyan
- Location within the Philippines
- Coordinates: 5°16′05″N 120°04′44″E
- Country: Philippines
- Region: Bangsamoro Autonomous Region in Muslim Mindanao
- Province: Tawi-Tawi
- House district: Lone district
- Parliamentary district: 2nd district
- Barangays: 20 (see Barangays)

Government
  - Type: Sangguniang Bayan
  - Mayor: Abduhasan I. Sali
  - Vice Mayor: Abubashar S. Matba
  - House Representative: Dimzsar M. Sali
  - Municipal Council: Members: Makaman N. Muddi; Santanina U. Bantilan; Mardella D. Matba; Pingguan S. Kalam; Nurunnihma A. Mammah; Saidul S. Mustapa; Abdulgafur J. Abah; Kublai N. Elias
  - Electorate: 21,892 voters (2025)

Area
  - Total: 581.20 km^{2} (224.40 sq mi)
- Elevation: 5.0 m (16.4 ft)
- Highest elevation: 539 m (1,768 ft)
- Lowest elevation: 0 m (0 ft)

Population (2024 census)
  - Total: 41,587
  - Density: 71.554/km^{2} (185.32/sq mi)
  - Households: 6,599

Economy
  - Income class: 1st municipal income class
  - Poverty incidence: 54.01% (2023)
  - Revenue: ₱ 279.3 million (2024)
  - Assets: ₱ 225.4 million (2024)
  - Expenditure: ₱ 265.8 million (2024)
  - Liabilities: ₱ 57.43 million (2024)

Service provider
  - Electricity: Tawi Tawi Electric Cooperative (TAWELCO)
- Time zone: UTC+8 (PST)
- ZIP code: 7509
- PSGC: 1907009000
- IDD : area code: +63 (0)68
- Native languages: Sama; Tagalog
- Website: www.languyan.gov.ph

Languyan, officially the Municipality of Languyan (Tagalog: Bayan ng Languyan), is a municipality in the province of Tawi-Tawi, Philippines. According to the 2024 census, it has a population of 41,587 people.

== Geography ==
=== Barangays ===
Languyan is politically subdivided into 20 barangays. Each barangay consists of puroks while some have sitios.

- Bakong
- Bas-bas Proper
- Basnunuk
- Darussalam
- Languyan Proper (Poblacion)
- Maraning
- Simalak
- Tuhog-Tuhog
- Tumahubong
- Tumbagaan
- Parang Pantay
- Adnin
- Bakaw-bakaw
- BasLikud
- Jakarta (Lookan Latuan)
- Kalupag
- Kiniktal
- Marang-marang
- Sikullis
- Tubig Dakula (Bohe Mahiya)

=== Climate ===
Climate data for Languyan, Tawi-Tawi
Month	Jan	Feb	Mar	Apr	May	Jun	Jul	Aug	Sep	Oct	Nov	Dec	Year
Mean daily maximum °C (°F)	28 (82)	28 (82)	29 (84)	30 (86)	29 (84)	29 (84)	29 (84)	29 (84)	30 (86)	29 (84)	29 (84)	29 (84)	29 (84)
Mean daily minimum °C (°F)	24 (75)	24 (75)	24 (75)	24 (75)	25 (77)	25 (77)	24 (75)	24 (75)	24 (75)	25 (77)	25 (77)	24 (75)	24 (76)
Average precipitation mm (inches)	157 (6.2)	115 (4.5)	123 (4.8)	96 (3.8)	136 (5.4)	120 (4.7)	104 (4.1)	89 (3.5)	86 (3.4)	131 (5.2)	151 (5.9)	159 (6.3)	1,467 (57.8)
Average rainy days	20.4	17.5	20.4	21.1	26.7	25.7	26.0	24.5	24.0	27.7	26.3	24.7	285
Source: Meteoblue

== Demographics ==
Population census of Languyan
Year	Pop.	±% p.a.
1980	16,269	—
1990	31,984	+6.99%
1995	32,738	+0.44%
2000	42,040	+5.51%
2007	51,377	+2.80%
2010	42,690	−6.52%
2015	33,494	−4.52%
2020	37,096	+2.17%
2024	41,587	+2.78%
Source: Philippine Statistics Authority

== Economy ==
Poverty Incidence of Languyan

Source: Philippine Statistics Authority
