= Bongao =

Capital of Tawi-Tawi province, Philippines

Bongao بوڠااو
- Municipality
- Municipality of Bongao
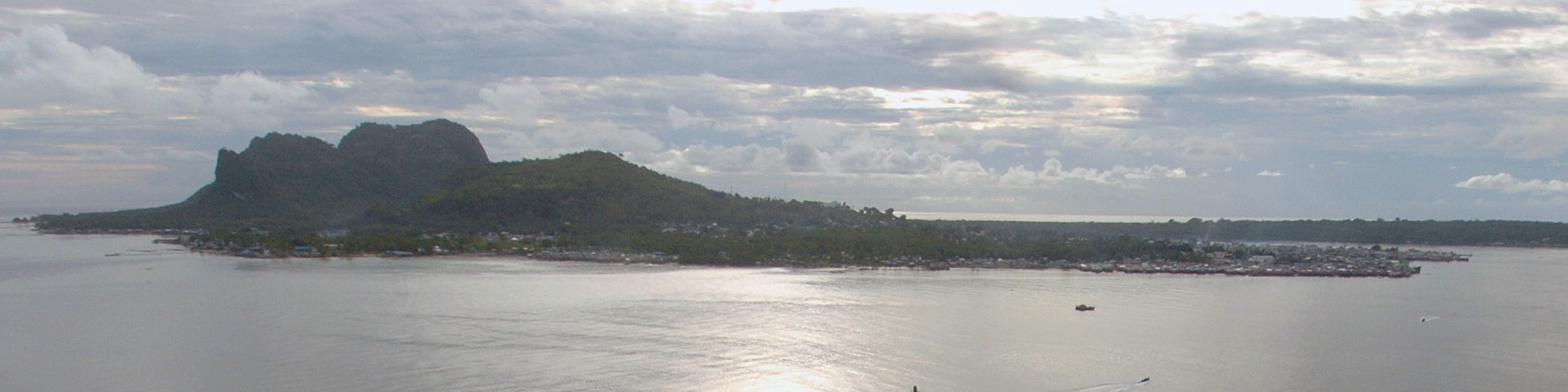
- Aerial view of the Bongao Coast

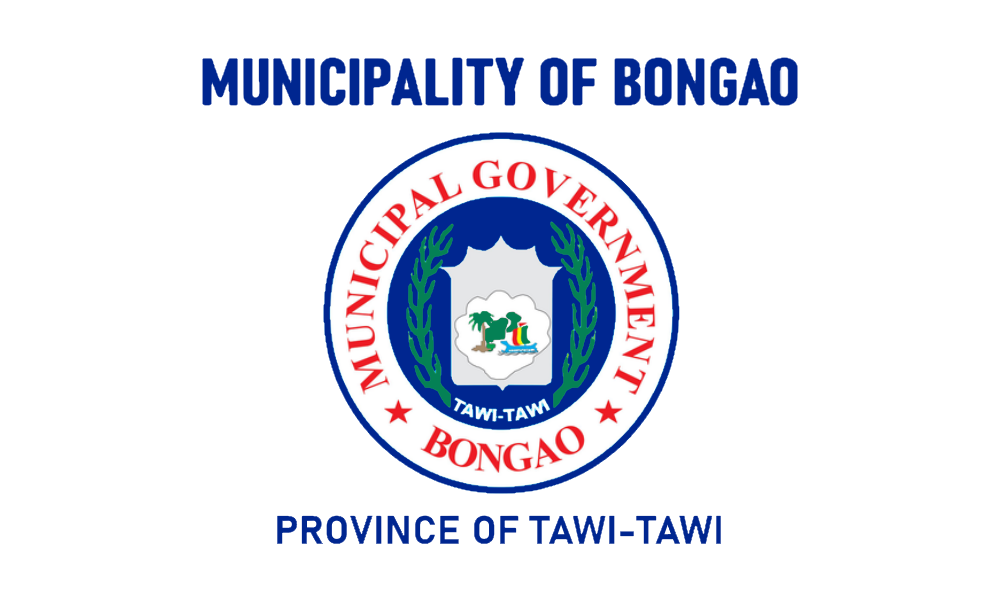
- Flag Seal
- Interactive map of Bongao
- Location within the Philippines
- Coordinates: 5°01′45″N 119°46′23″E
- Country: Philippines
- Region: Bangsamoro Autonomous Region in Muslim Mindanao
- Province: Tawi-Tawi
- House district: Lone district
- Parliamentary district: 1st district
- Founded: July 1, 1958
- Barangays: 35 (see Barangays)

Government
  - Type: Sangguniang Bayan
  - Mayor: Jimuel S. Que
  - Vice Mayor: Jasper S. Que
  - House Representative: Dimszar M. Sali
  - City Council: Members: Talib Q. Ibbo Jr.; Mon Harris T. Samsuya; Rufaida S. Akip; Midzfar H. Pajiji; Acmed H. Kalbit; Hussin Lhong S. Karanain; Nagder A. Sangkula; Khaizal A. Jumdail
  - Electorate: 69,754 voters (2025)

Area
  - Total: 365.95 km^{2} (141.29 sq mi)
- Elevation: 6.0 m (19.7 ft)
- Highest elevation: 408 m (1,339 ft)
- Lowest elevation: 0 m (0 ft)

Population (2024 census)
  - Total: 131,887
  - Density: 360.40/km^{2} (933.42/sq mi)
  - Households: 19,589

Economy
  - Income class: 1st municipal income class
  - Poverty incidence: 28.81% (2023)
  - Revenue: ₱ 389 million (2024)
  - Assets: ₱ 589.5 million (2024)
  - Expenditure: ₱ 376.5 million (2024)
  - Liabilities: ₱ 79.74 million (2024)

Service provider
  - Electricity: Tawi Tawi Electric Cooperative (TAWELCO)
- Time zone: UTC+8 (PST)
- ZIP code: 7500
- PSGC: 1907002000
- IDD : area code: +63 (0)68
- Native languages: Sama; Tagalog; Sabah Malay
- Website: www.bongao.gov.ph

Bongao, officially the Municipality of Bongao (Tagalog: Bayan ng Bongao), is a municipality and capital of the province of Tawi-Tawi, Philippines. According to the 2024 census, it has a population of 131,887 people.

== History ==
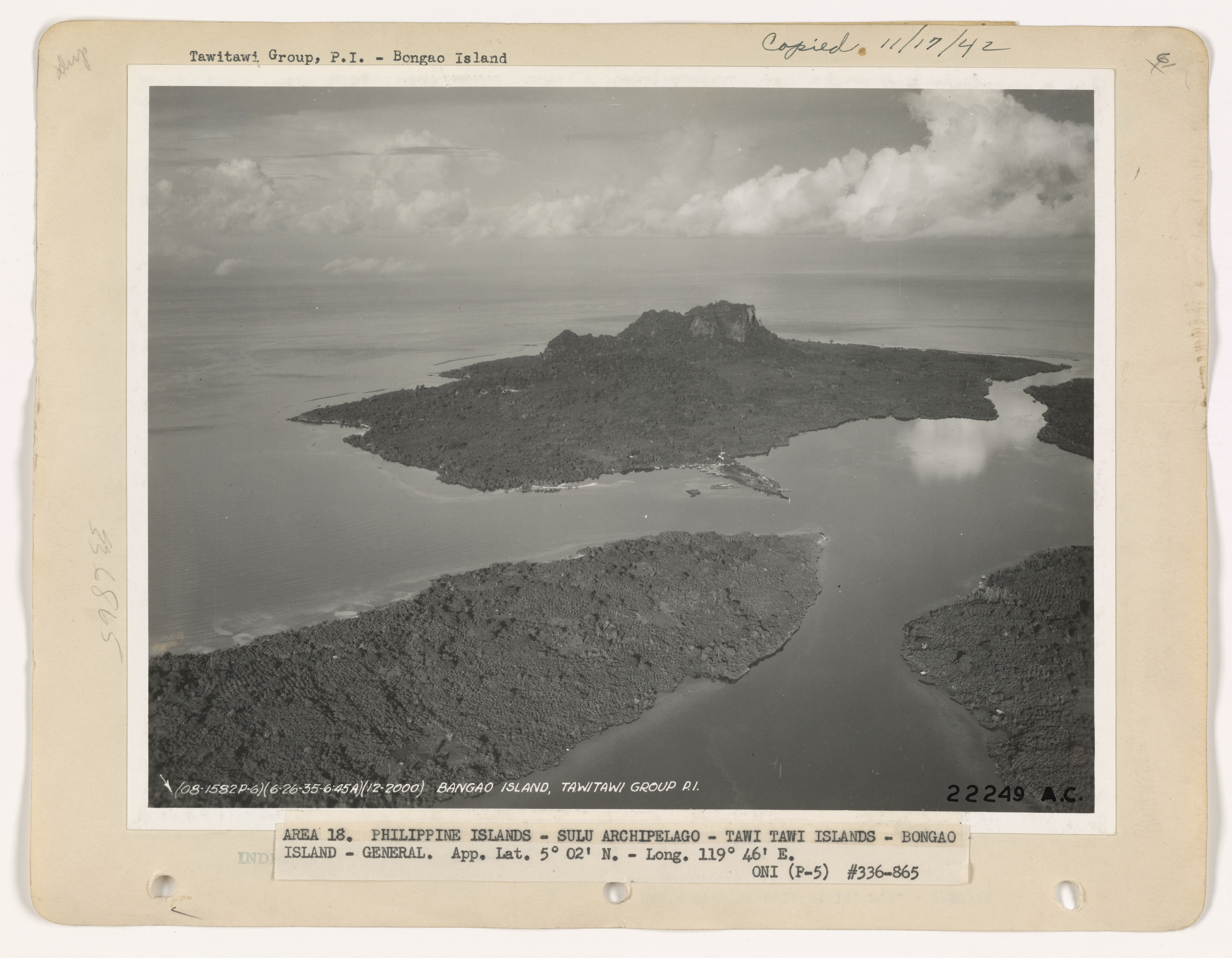
Aerial view of Bongao Island, circa pre-1942

Evidence of human presence in Bongao was carbon-dated to be 8,810 to 5,190 years old, signifying one of the earliest known evidence of human presence in Southeast Asia. The bones, jars, shells, and other artifacts and fossils were found in the Balobok Rock Shelter Cave Archaeological Site, which has been declared as an Important Cultural Treasure by the government in 2017.

Much of the Bongao area was the center of Bajau culture and arts for hundreds of years. By the 14th century, Muslim missionaries from Arabia arrived and established the first ever mosque in the Philippines. The area was heavily converted to Islam, especially when the Sultanate of Sulu in nearby Sulu province was founded.

The province of Tawi-Tawi was never officially controlled directly by the Spanish as the Sultanate of Sulu was in a perpetual war with Spain, resulting in the preservation of its Muslim and Bajau cultures. However, the sultanate waned and was captured by Spain, only to be handed to American forces after a few years. Sibutu remained under Spanish rule until 1900.

Bongao was formally incorporated as a municipality on July 1, 1958 under Executive Order No. 355 signed by President Carlos P. Garcia.

Before the armed rebellion of the MNLF in the early 1970s, Bongao was merely a backwater village. The capital of the province was Batu-Batu (in Panglima Sugala) in the mainland situated in a cove with deep waters suited for anchors of the Philippine Navy. At the height of the armed rebellion and fearing that the provincial capitol might be overrun, the government transferred it to Bongao. The white-washed, Taj Mahal-inspired provincial capitol building is located on a hill overlooking the bay and the whole town to the north of the Island against the backdrop of Mount Kabugan and the famous Bud Bongao (Bongao Peak).

The transfer of the seat of government marked the beginning of rapid development on the island, establishing it as the southernmost center of commerce and trade. The population quickly increased as government employees and their families relocated to the town.

In 2026, a wild fire devastated over 1,000 homes on the island. The fire was centered in Barangay Lamion. The blaze, which started late on the night of February 3, spread rapidly through the densely packed community of stilt houses, fueled by strong winds and lightweight building materials. Authorities reported no fatalities, and emergency responders evacuated families to temporary shelters while relief efforts were underway.

== Geography ==
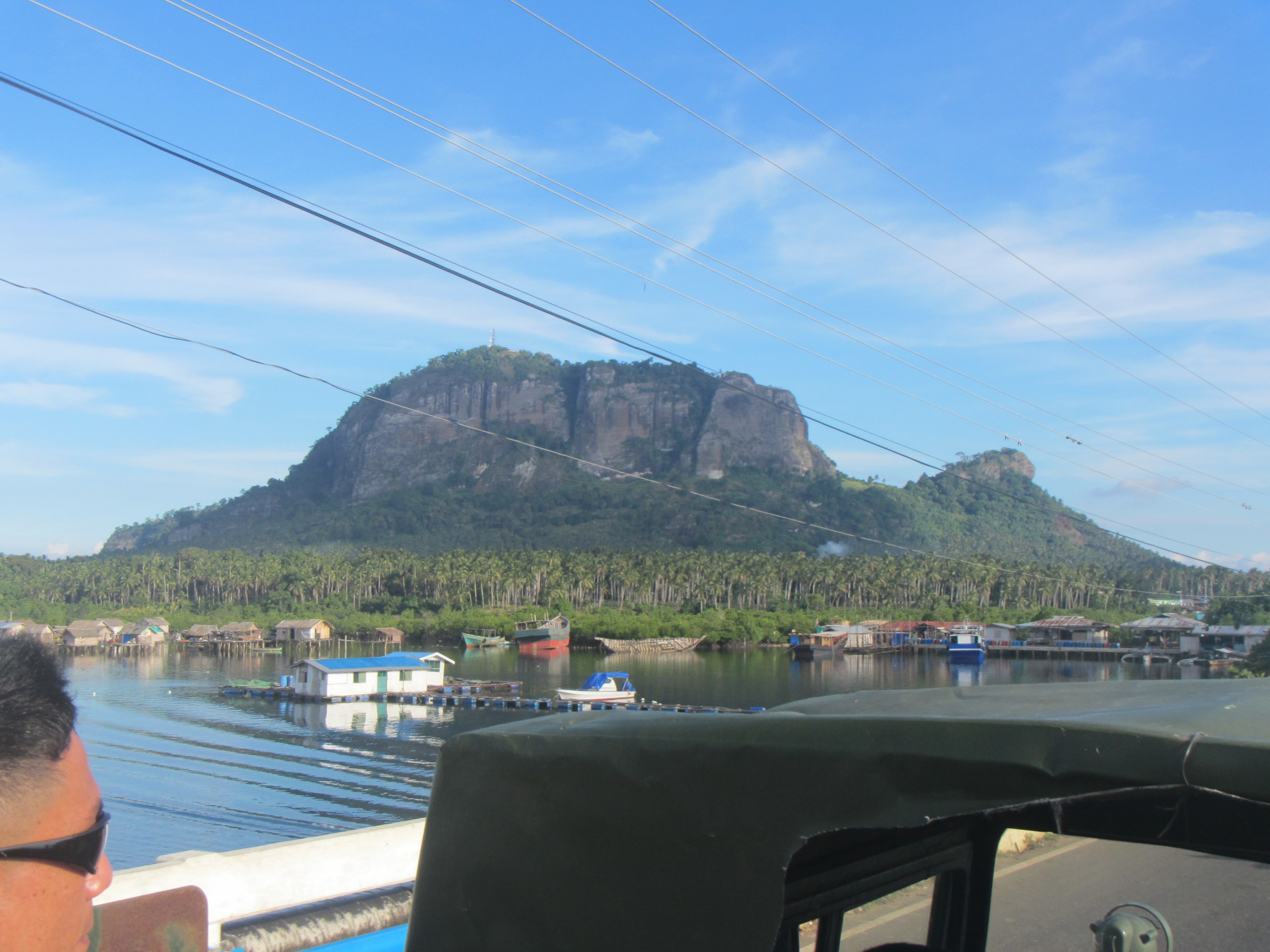
Bud Bongao, a 250-hectare (620-acre) mountain-forest located within the municipality

The City's territory includes Bongao Island (where the poblacion is located), Sanga-Sanga Island, Pababag Island, as well as the western end of Tawi-Tawi Island.

=== Barangays ===
Bongao is politically subdivided into 35 barangays. Each barangay consists of puroks while some have sitios.

These barangays are split into two geographical regions: Mainland and Islands.

- Ipil - M
- Kamagong - M
- Karungdong- I
- Lakit Lakit- I
- Lamion- I
- Lapid Lapid - M
- Lato Lato- I
- Luuk Pandan - I
- Luuk Tulay - M
- Malassa- I
- Mandulan- I
- Masantong - M
- Montay Montay - M
- Pababag - I
- Pagasinan - I
- Pahut- I
- Pakias- I
- Paniongan- I
- Pasiagan - I
- Bongao Poblacion- I
- Sanga-Sanga- I
- Silubog - M
- Simandagit- I
- Sumangat - M
- Tarawakan - M
- Tongsinah- I
- Tubig Basag- I
- Ungus-ungus - M
- Lagasan- I
- Nalil- I
- Pagatpat - M
- Pag-asa - I
- Tubig Tanah- I
- Tubig-Boh- I
- Tubig-Mampallam- I

=== Climate ===
Bongao has a tropical rainforest climate (Af) with heavy rainfall year-round.

Climate data for Bongao
Month	Jan	Feb	Mar	Apr	May	Jun	Jul	Aug	Sep	Oct	Nov	Dec	Year
Mean daily maximum °C (°F)	29.6 (85.3)	29.6 (85.3)	30.2 (86.4)	30.9 (87.6)	31.5 (88.7)	31.1 (88.0)	31.1 (88.0)	31.3 (88.3)	31.3 (88.3)	31.0 (87.8)	30.5 (86.9)	30.0 (86.0)	30.7 (87.2)
Daily mean °C (°F)	26.1 (79.0)	26.1 (79.0)	26.4 (79.5)	26.7 (80.1)	27.2 (81.0)	26.8 (80.2)	26.7 (80.1)	26.9 (80.4)	26.8 (80.2)	26.7 (80.1)	26.5 (79.7)	26.3 (79.3)	26.6 (79.9)
Mean daily minimum °C (°F)	22.6 (72.7)	22.6 (72.7)	22.6 (72.7)	22.6 (72.7)	22.9 (73.2)	22.6 (72.7)	22.4 (72.3)	22.6 (72.7)	22.4 (72.3)	22.5 (72.5)	22.6 (72.7)	22.6 (72.7)	22.6 (72.7)
Average rainfall mm (inches)	177 (7.0)	146 (5.7)	123 (4.8)	126 (5.0)	179 (7.0)	178 (7.0)	144 (5.7)	118 (4.6)	132 (5.2)	183 (7.2)	196 (7.7)	172 (6.8)	1,874 (73.7)
Source: Climate-Data.org

== Demographics ==
Population census of Bongao
Year	Pop.	±% p.a.
1903	1,854	—
1918	3,486	+4.30%
1939	4,510	+1.23%
1948	5,626	+2.49%
1960	10,822	+5.60%
1970	20,983	+6.84%
1975	20,560	−0.41%
1980	27,884	+6.28%
1990	37,932	+3.13%
1995	46,672	+3.96%
2000	58,174	+4.84%
2007	95,055	+7.01%
2010	79,362	−6.36%
2015	100,527	+4.61%
2020	116,118	+3.08%
2024	131,887	+3.10%
Source: Philippine Statistics Authority

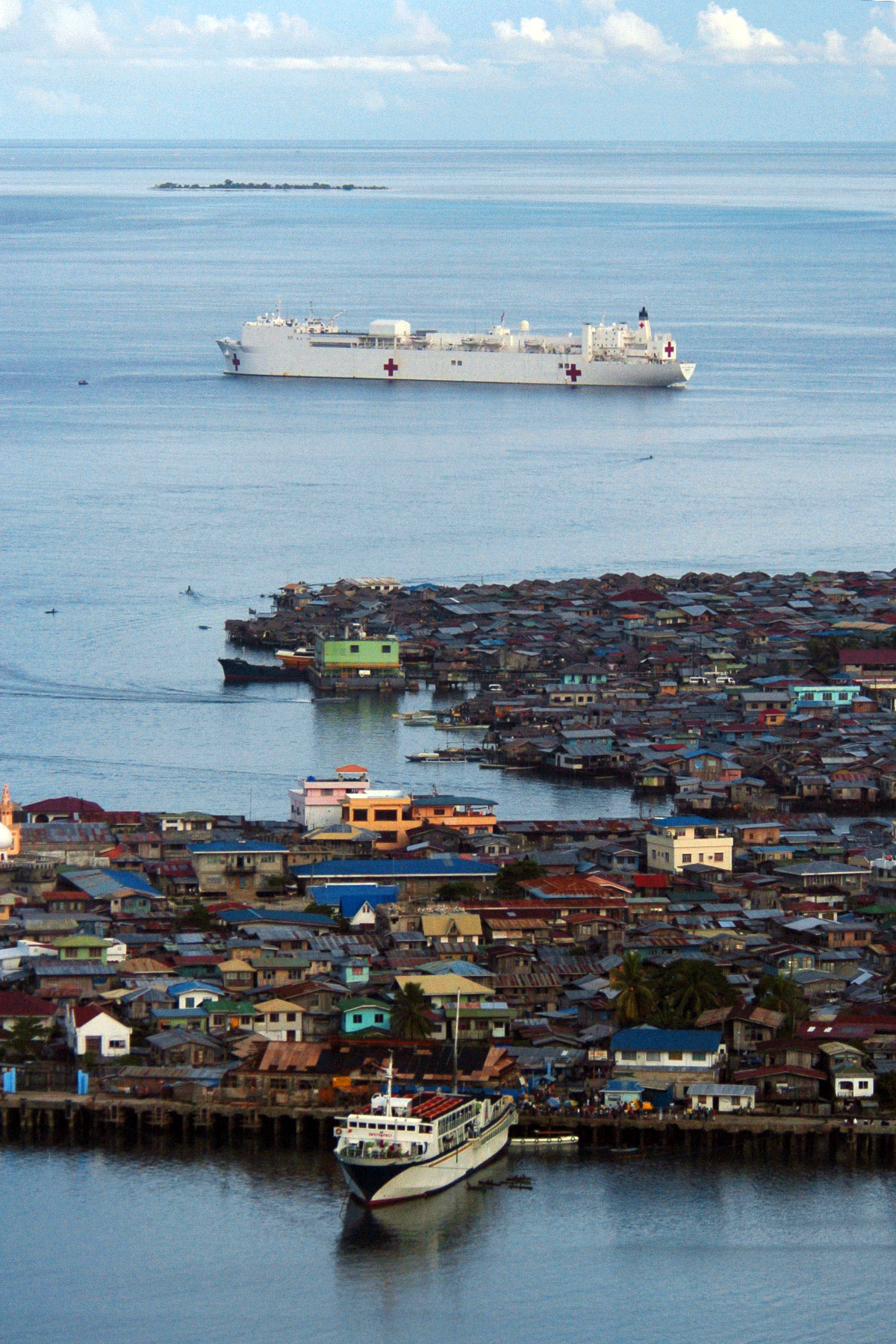
Bongao poblacion

== Culture ==
Today, Bongao is a minuscule cosmopolitan site that is becoming a model of multicultural society. In downtown Bongao, there are mosques for the majority Muslim population, a Catholic church, a church for Protestant inhabitants, and a Chinese temple.

The municipality is the home of the Balobok Rock Shelter-Cave Archaeological Site, which carbon dates the existence of humans on Tawi-Tawi for 5,000-8,000 years, making it one of the earliest human settlement site in Southeast Asia. The entire archaeological site has been declared as an Important Cultural Property by the National Government in 2017.

== Economy ==
Poverty Incidence of Bongao

Source: Philippine Statistics Authority

The town’s main thoroughfare is Datu Halun Street, where the municipal hall is located. The poblacion serves as the commercial center, with most businesses owned and operated by local residents. Owing to the area’s relative peace and order, recent Chinese migrants from Zamboanga have also established businesses in the town.

Banks operating in Bongao include Land Bank of the Philippines, Philippine National Bank, and Metrobank. Quedancor, a government owned investment company, has recently opened business.

The Midway Plaza Mall, a new 2-storey retail center, is the first shopping mall in Tawi-tawi opened in April 2010.

== Education ==
Bongao is home to the Mindanao State University–Tawi-Tawi College of Technology and Oceanography (MSU-TCTO), Tawi-Tawi Regional Agricultural College (TRAC), Mahardika Institute of Technology (MIT), Abubakar Learning Center Foundation College (ALC), Tawi-Tawi School of Midwifery (TTSM). The first two are government owned state colleges, while the last three are privately owned.

There are several secondary high schools in Tawi-Tawi such as the MSU–TCTO - Science High School, MSU–TCTO Preparatory High School, Tawi-Tawi School of Arts and Trades, Notre Dame of Bongao, and Tawi-Tawi School of Fisheries (TTSF).
