= Turtle Islands =

Turtle Islands can refer to:

- Turtle Islands Heritage Protected Area
  - Turtle Islands National Park, Malaysia
  - Turtle Islands Wildlife Sanctuary, the Philippines
    - Turtle Islands, Tawi-Tawi, a municipality
- Turtle Islands, Sierra Leone

== See also ==
- Turtle Island (disambiguation)
- Turtle Group National Park, Queensland, Australia
