= Great Bakkungaan Island =

Island in Tawi-Tawi, Philippines

- Location within Philippines
- Interactive map of Great Bakkungaan Island

Geography
- Location: Sulu Sea
- Coordinates: 06°05′N 118°19′E
- Archipelago: Turtle Islands
- Area: 0.5 km^{2} (0.19 sq mi)

Administration
- Philippines
- Region: Bangsamoro Autonomous Region in Muslim Mindanao (BARMM)
- Province: Tawi-Tawi
- Municipality: Turtle Islands

Great Bakkungaan Island (also called Bakungan Island) is a small tropical island surrounded by the Sulu Sea in the province of Tawi-Tawi, Philippines. The island is one of the seven Philippine Turtle Islands.

== Geography ==
The island is at the very edge of the international treaty limits separating the Philippines from Malaysia. Indeed, the island itself is referred to in the international border treaty concluded in 1930 between the United States (in respect of its then overseas territory, the Philippine Archipelago) and the United Kingdom (in respect of its then protectorate, the State of North Borneo). That treaty sets the international frontier as running in a straight line between Little Bakkungaan Island and Great Bakkungaan Island. Little Bakkungaan Island is one of the three Malaysian Turtle Islands and less than 2 km of water separate the two islands. This makes Great Bakkungaan Island the internationally recognized Philippine territory that is closest to Malaysian territory.

Great Bakkungaan is the third largest of the Philippine Turtle Islands at 51 hectares (130 acres) with the highest elevation at 58 metres (190 ft).

== History ==
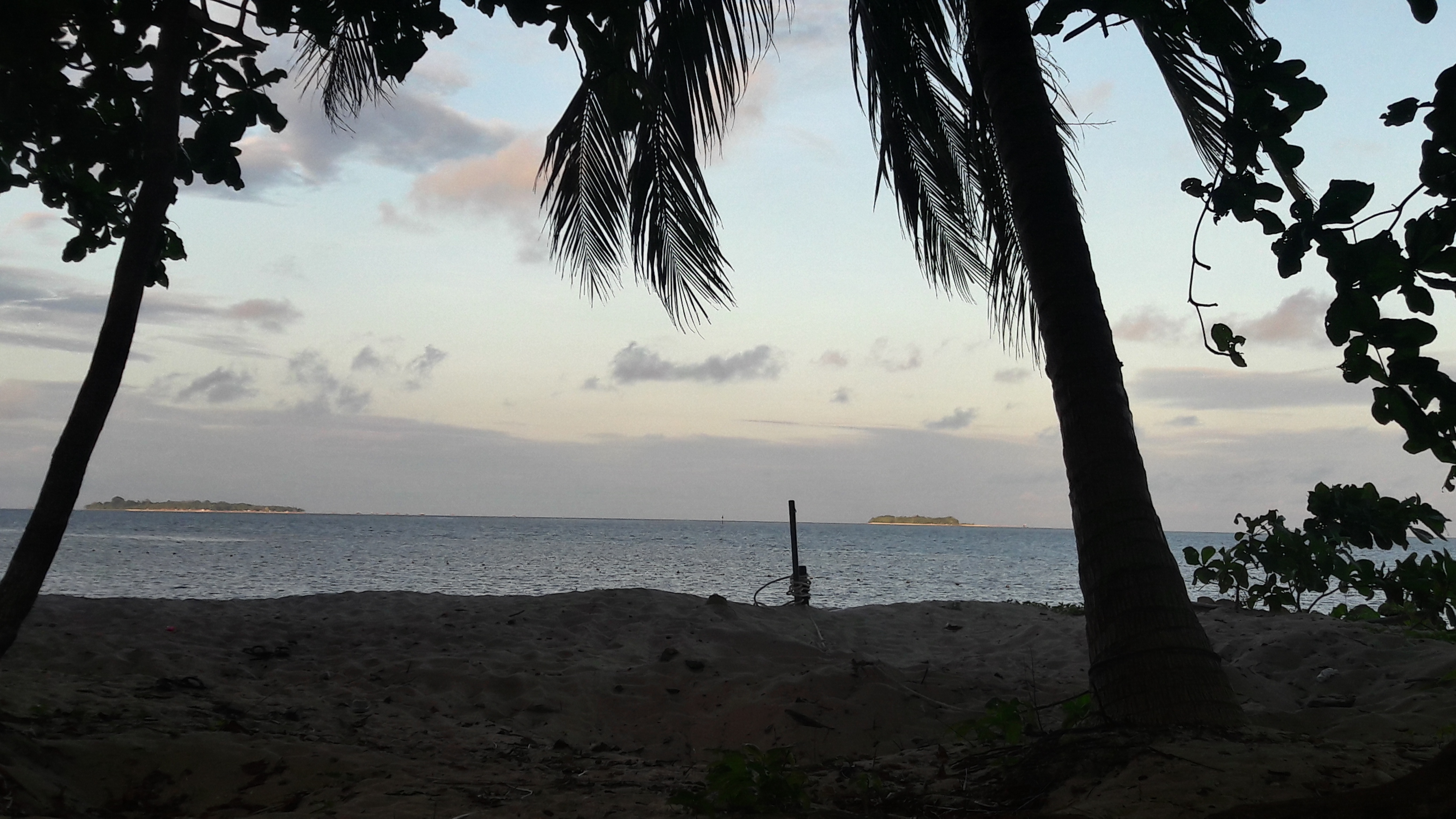
Little Bakkungaan Island (right) and Great Bakkungaan Island (left) as seen from Selingan Island.

As one of the Philippine Turtle Islands the island enjoys the historical distinction of being territory that was not under Philippine administration at the time of independence in 1946. The State of North Borneo, a United Kingdom protectorate, administered the Philippine island. The Republic of the Philippines took over the administration of the island from the United Kingdom on 16 October 1947.

== Government and ownership ==
The island is part of the barangay of Taganak Poblacion which had a population of 2,430 at the time of the 2010 census. It is in the municipality of the Turtle Islands. There is an elementary school on the island which had 266 students in the 2013/2014 academic year.

The island is part of the Turtle Islands Wildlife Sanctuary established on 12 August 1999 by Presidential Proclamation 171. The island is owned by the State.

There was a previous controversy concerning the island's ownership. According to a 2009 report in the Philippine Daily Inquirer, the island was settled by a certain Sing Kok Tan in 1952. In 1997 his heirs decided to sell the island to the children of a local politician, Sadikul A. Sahali who later served as governor of the province of Tawi-Tawi. By 2007, according to then Governor Sahali, his children were preparing to submit their application to have their ownership of the island registered. However, by then the island had already been declared to be part of the Turtle Islands Wildlife Sanctuary and the Sahali family decided not to pursue their land title claim.

== Crime and Piracy ==
The Abu Sayyaf criminal terrorist group who specialise in kidnap for ransome is active in the vicinity of the island. In 2017 it was reported they had abducted 3 Indonesian sailors in waters off Great Bakkungaan. The following month it was reported that an alleged Abu Sayyaf terrorist was killed in a fire fight with government forces who were conducting maritime security patrol off the waters of Great Bakkungaan.
