= Taganak =

Taganak may refer to:

- Taganak Island, the largest of the seven Philippine Turtle Islands
- Taqanak, a city in Iran
- USS Taganak (AG-45), a ship
