= Little Bakkungaan Island =

Island in Malaysia

- Interactive map of Little Bakkungaan Island

Geography
- Coordinates: 6°08′58″N 118°3′15″E
- Archipelago: Turtle Islands
- Area: 0.085 km^{2} (0.033 sq mi)

Administration
- Malaysia
- State: Sabah
- Division: Sandakan
- District: Sandakan

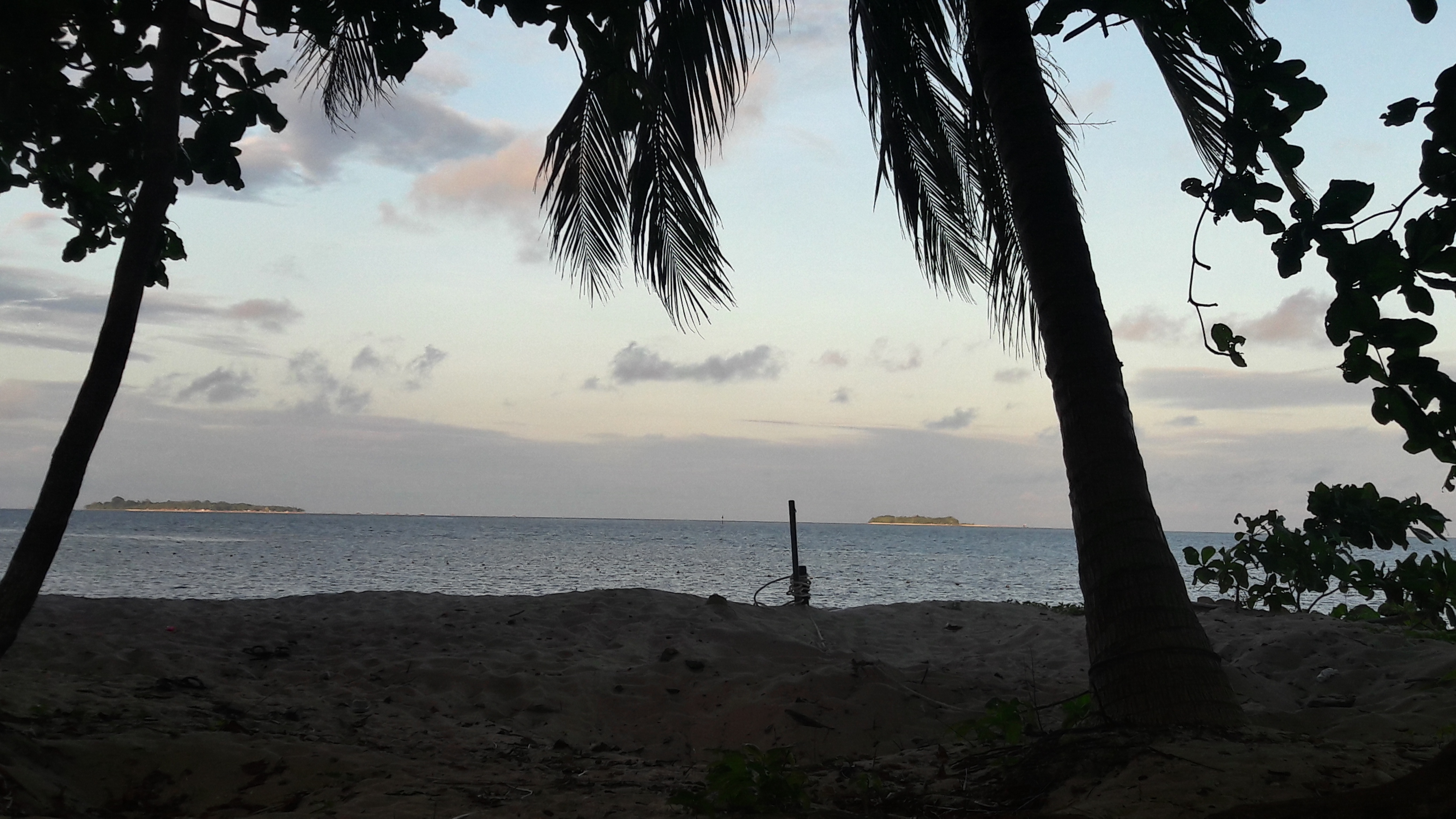
Little Bakkungaan Island (right) and Great Bakkungaan Island (left) as seen from Selingan Island.

Little Bakkungaan Island (Malay: Pulau Bakungan Kecil) is a tiny, flat, tropical island surrounded by the Sulu Sea in the state of Sabah, Malaysia. The island is the largest of the three Malaysian Turtle Islands that together comprise the Turtle Islands National Park. It covers a land area of 8.5 hectares. It is at the very edge of the international treaty limits separating Malaysia from the Republic of the Philippines. Indeed, the island itself is referred to in the international border treaty concluded in 1930 between the United States (in respect of its then overseas territory, the Philippine Archipelago) and the United Kingdom (in respect of its then protectorate, the State of North Borneo). That treaty sets the international frontier as running in a straight line between Little Bakkungaan Island and Great Bakkungaan Island. Great Bakkungaan Island is one of the Philippine Turtle Islands and less than 2km of water separate the two islands. This makes Little Bakkungaan Island the internationally recognised Malaysian territory that is closest to Philippine territory. The island hosts a turtle hatchery. The island is administered by Sabah Parks. There are several buildings on the island used by park rangers as well as a peer. Much of the island is surrounded by beach.
