= Turtle Islands Heritage Protected Area =

Protected area in the Sulu Archipelago

The Turtle Islands Heritage Protected Area is a marine protected area consisting of the Turtle Islands Wildlife Sanctuary (Philippines), and the Turtle Islands National Park (Malaysia).

== History ==
The creation of a protected area for nesting was first recommended at the December 1993 First ASEAN Symposium-Workshop on Marine Turtle Conservation. Sea turtle egg production had declined by 88% due to over-fishing and habitat destruction, and a decision was made by both the Philippines and Malaysian governments to safeguard their rookeries. The establishment of the area occurred during a territorial dispute between the two countries over their maritime borders.

On May 31, 1996, a memorandum of agreement was signed by the two governments and the area was formally established with three islands in Malaysia and six in the Philippines. The Malaysia government cleared their islands of people and created the Turtle Islands Park on October 1, 1997; the Philippines officially created the Turtle Islands Wildlife Sanctuary to administer their islands in 1999. Both regions are administered primarily by their respective governments, though there is a joint management committee.

== Flora and fauna ==
The TIHPA is the largest turtle nesting area and only nesting area for the green sea turtle (Chelonia mydas) in ASEAN. When the site was established, it held the world's largest rookery; as of 2017, it had remained one of their most important nesting sites. The area also provides nesting sites for Hawksbill turtle (Eretmochelys imbricata). In 2017, there were 34 species of birds, between 76 and 128 species of fish, 62 species of marine plants, 15 woody plants, and between 24 and 27 genera of corals. It also had snakes and monitor lizards.
