= USS Lake Arthur =

Cargo ship of the United States Navy

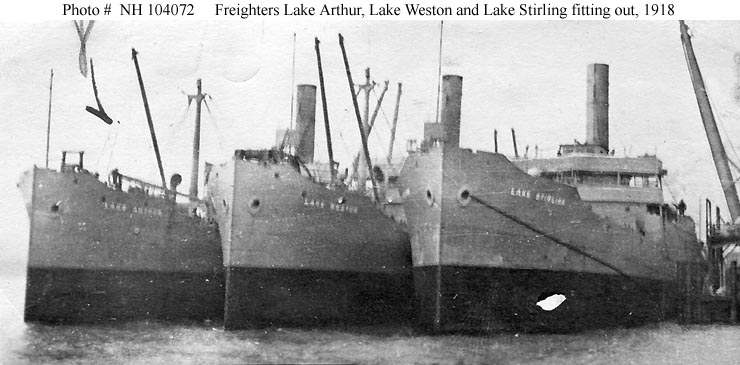
- S.S. Lake Arthur (American Freighter, 1918), S.S. Lake Weston (American Freighter, 1918), and S.S. Lake Stirling (American Freighter, 1918) -- listed from left to right

History
- Name: 1918: War Plum; 1918: Lake Arthur; 1923: Virginia Limited; 1930: Valentine; 1923: Sesotris
- Namesake: 1918: Lake Arthur, Louisiana
- Owner: 1918: USSB; 1921: Richmond–New York Steamship Co.; 1925: Eastern Steamship Lines; 1930: Gordon C. Leitch; 1930: Helmsing and Grimm; 1931: Schiffahrts A.G. Nord Ost; 1932: Albert Klat; 1935: Hanseatischen Reederei Emil Offen & Co.
- Operator: 1918–1919: United States Navy as USS Lake Arthur (ID-2915)
- Port of registry: 1918: [United States]; 1921: New York; 1925: Newport News, Virginia; 1930: (United Kingdom) Middlesbrough; 1930: (Latvia) Riga; 1932: (Egypt) Alexandria; 1935: (Nazi Germany) Hamburg
- Builder: Detroit Shipbuilding Company; Wyandotte, Michigan
- Yard number: 217
- Launched: 16 February 1918
- Commissioned: 17 September 1918 at Brest, France
- Decommissioned: 3 April 1919
- Fate: Scuttled in the North Sea with cargo of chemical weapons, 17 November 1945

General characteristics
- Type: Design 1020 ship
- Tonnage: 1,948 GRT
- Length: 261 ft (80 m)
- Beam: 43 ft 6 in (13.26 m)
- Draft: 17 ft 9 in (5.41 m)
- Propulsion: 1 x triple-expansion steam engine
- Speed: 9 knots (17 km/h)
- Complement: 52 (as USS Lake Arthur, 1918–19)
- Armament: 1 x 3 in (7.6 cm) gun (World War I)

SS Lake Arthur (ID-2915) was a Design 1020 cargo ship that served in the Naval Overseas Transportation Service (NOTS) of the United States Navy during World War I. Originally ordered and begun under the name SS War Plum, she was renamed SS Lake Arthur by the United States Shipping Board (USSB). After her naval service, she operated commercially under a variety of names, before being scuttled in the North Sea with a load of chemical weapons in November 1945.

== Career ==
Ordered by the British government, the ship was laid down by the Detroit Shipbuilding Company of Wyandotte, Michigan, under the name War Plum. When the USSB requisitioned all shipping under construction in the United States after the U.S. entered World War I in April 1917, she was renamed Lake Arthur, after the southwestern Louisiana town of Lake Arthur. The ship was launched on 16 February 1918, and completed in March.

Under the auspices of the USSB, Lake Arthur sailed across the Atlantic and was employed in cargo duties. While at Brest, France, on 17 September 1918, she was transferred the United States Navy and commissioned the same day under the command of Lieutenant Commander Edwin T. Madden, USNRF. She was assigned to the NOTS and carried stores for the United States Army from ports in the United Kingdom to ports in France over the next five months. On 18 February 1919, loaded with U.S. Army cargo, Lake Arthur departed from Cardiff and arrived at Philadelphia on 11 March. There, she was decommissioned on 3 April and returned to the USSB the same day.

The USSB sold Lake Arthur to the Richmond-New York Steamship Company of New York in 1921. The ship was renamed Virginia Limited in 1923, and sold to the Eastern Steamship Lines of Newport News, Virginia, in 1925. The ship was sold in 1930 to Gordon C. Leitch of Middlesbrough, and then, later the same year, to Helmsing and Grimm of Riga and renamed Valentine. The following year Schiffahrts A.G.Nord Ost, of Riga, purchased the ship. In 1932 Albert Klat of Alexandria purchased the ship and renamed her Sesostris.

In 1935, Hanseatische Reederei Emil Offen & Co. of Hamburg purchased the ship, and she remained under German control through the end of World War II. Sesotris was seized by the British at Kiel in May 1945. After she was loaded with a cargo of chemical weapons, Sesotris was steered to the Skagerrak Strait in the North Sea and scuttled on 17 November 1945.
