= Toledo Shipbuilding Company =

Shipyard in Ohio, United States

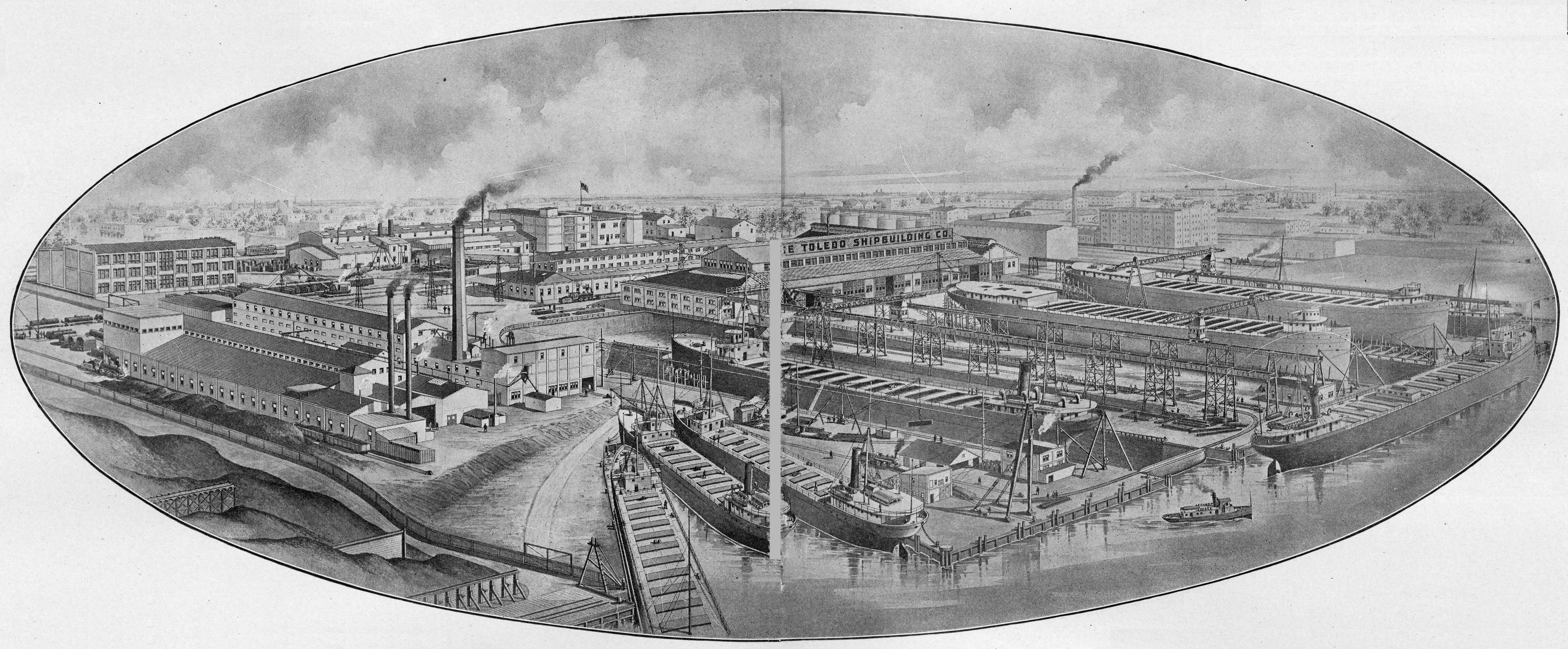
- Panoramic view of the company, ca. 1912
- Industry: Shipbuilding
- Predecessor: Craig Shipbuilding Company
- Founded: 1905
- Founders: Lyman C. Smith; Horace S. Wilkinson; Charles B. Calder; Alexander McVittie
- Defunct: 1945
- Successor: AmShip Toledo
- Headquarters: Toledo, Ohio, USA
- Products: Ships
- Services: Ship repair

The Toledo Shipbuilding Company was a shipyard located on Toledo, Ohio.

== History ==
The Toledo Shipbuilding Company was founded in 1905 when a syndicate of investors purchased the Craig Shipbuilding Company in Toledo, Ohio. The group was composed of Lyman C. Smith (Smith Typewriter Company); Horace S. Wilkinson (United States Transportation Company); Charles B. Calder (American Shipbuilding Detroit); and Alexander McVittie (American Shipbuilding Detroit). The company was incorporated with share capital of $1,000,000. Frank E. Kirby was named as the ship architect and engineer. They focused on bulk freighters. In 1917, they built the Tours and Limoges for the French; and were commissioned to build seven freighters for the United Kingdom which were later requisitioned by the United States Shipping Board (USSB). They went on to build an additional 30 ships for the USSB (including 8 Design 1020 ships). After World War I, due to a post-war glut of ships, they focused on repair work. They returned to shipbuilding in 1920 and launched 14 ships through 1930. During the Great Depression, they returned to ship repair. During World War II, Toledo Shipbuilding built the USCG icebreakers Storis (1942) and Mackinaw (1944). In 1945, they built their last vessel, barge P. M. 88. In 1945, they were purchased by their main rival, the American Shipbuilding Company via its subsidiary Delta Shipbuilding Company and renamed as AmSouth Toledo.

== Gallery ==
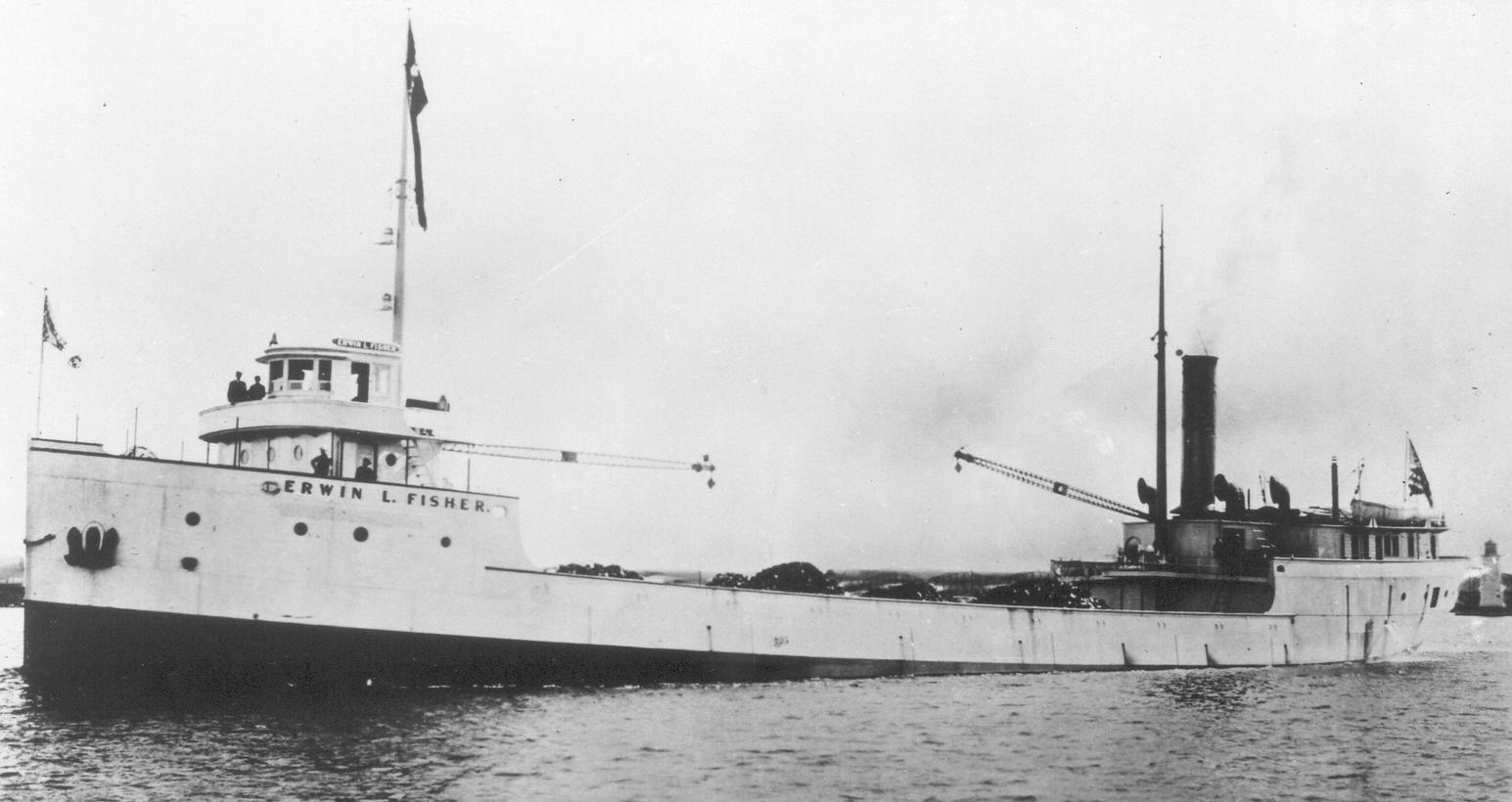
Erwin L. Fisher.

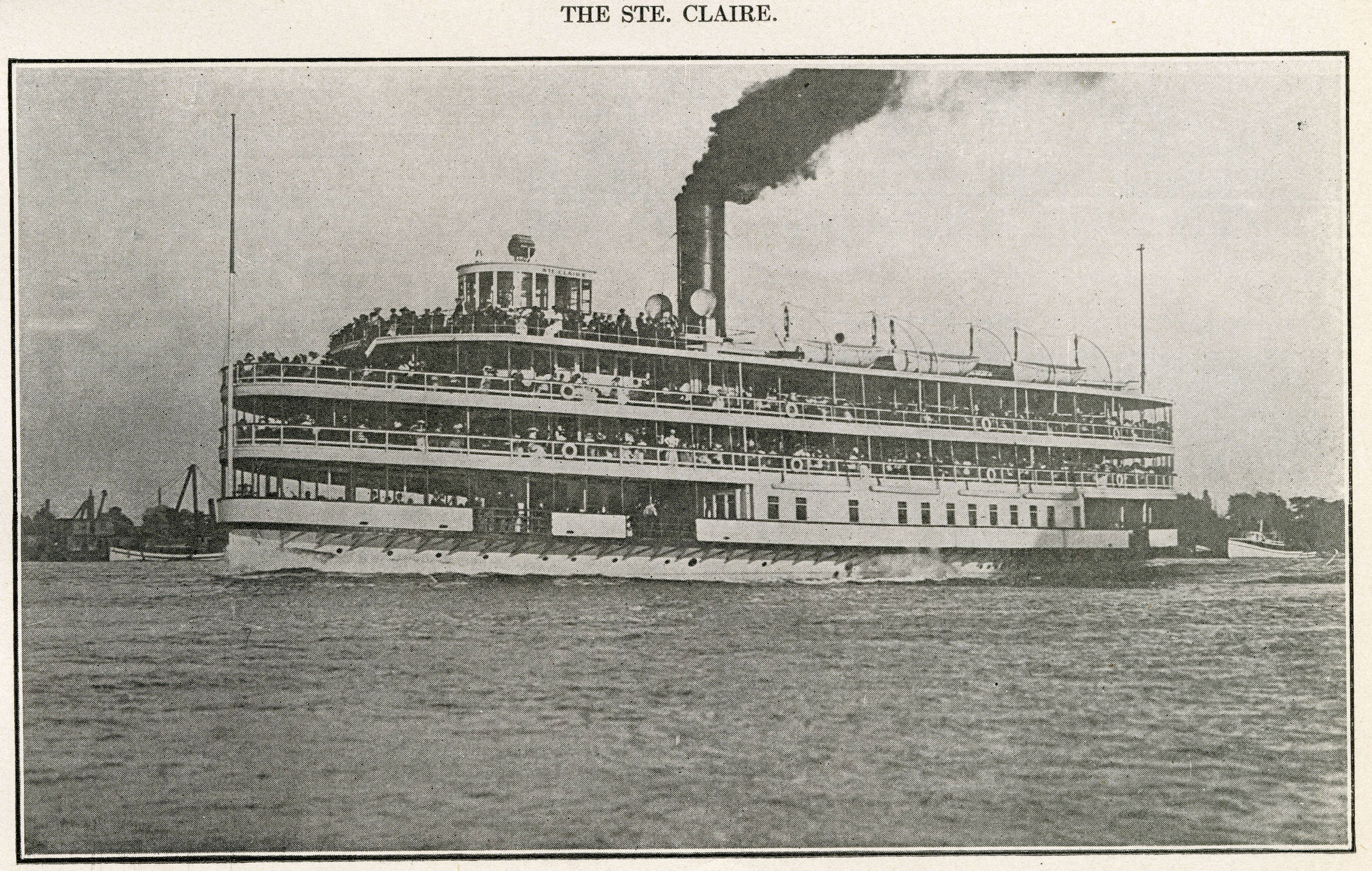
SS Ste. Claire in a 1912 advertisement for the Toledo Shipbuilding Company

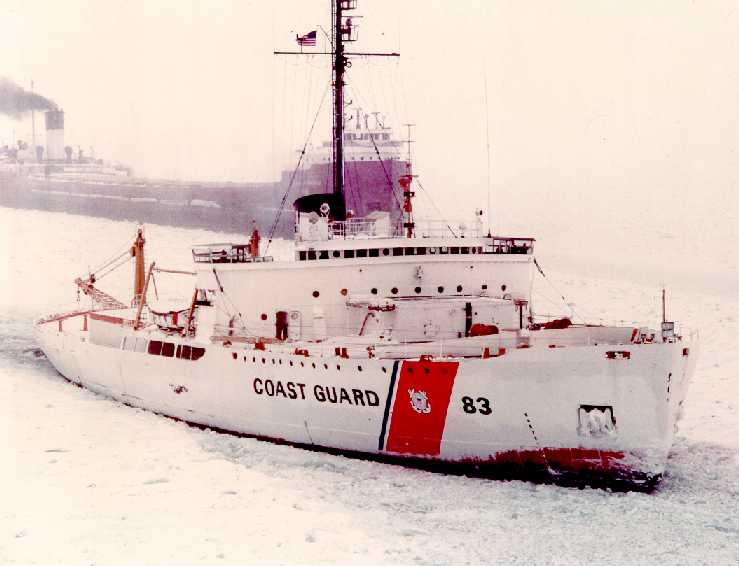
USCGC Mackinaw (WAGB-83)

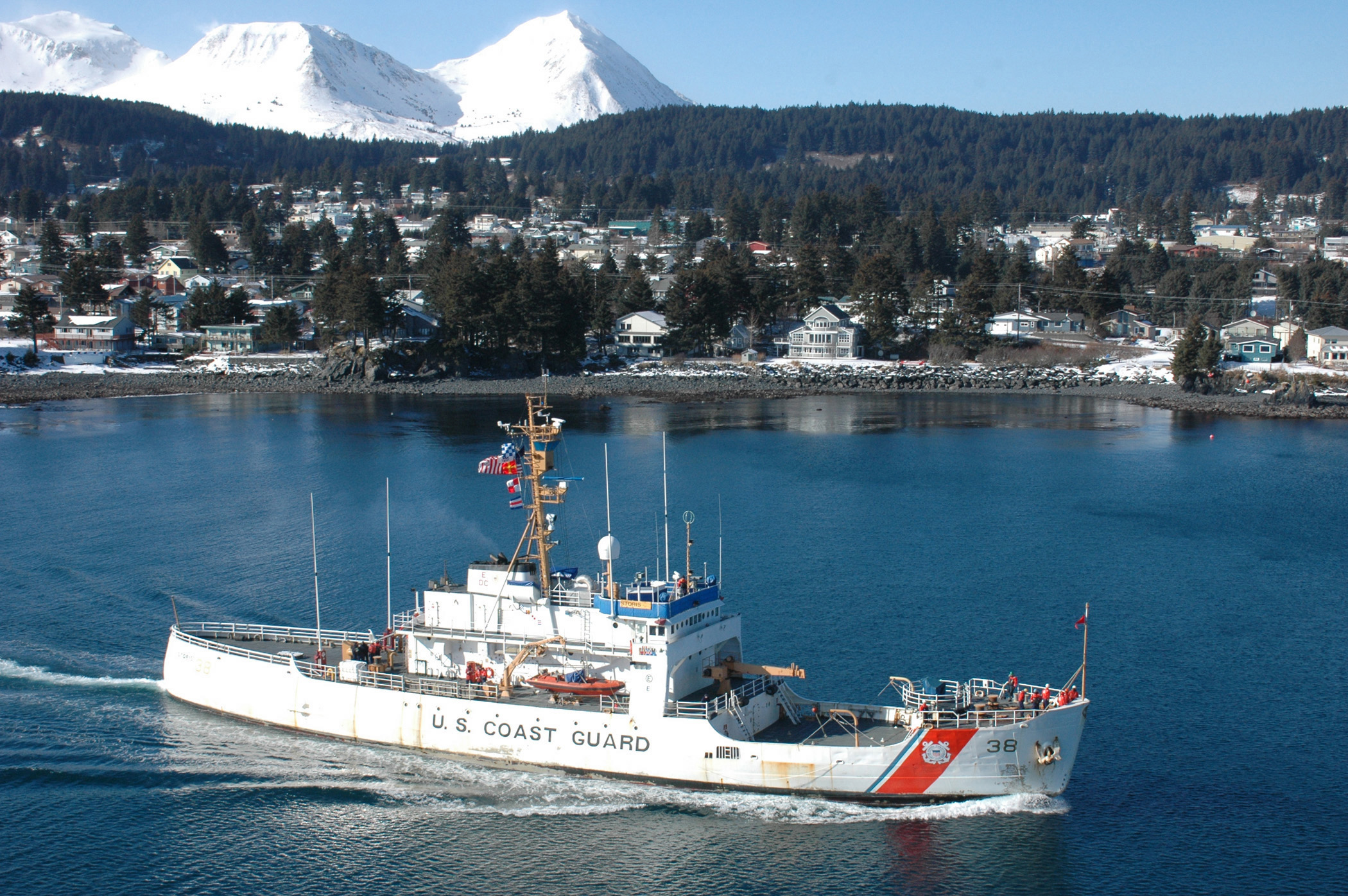
USCGC Storis (WMEC-38) after decommissioning.

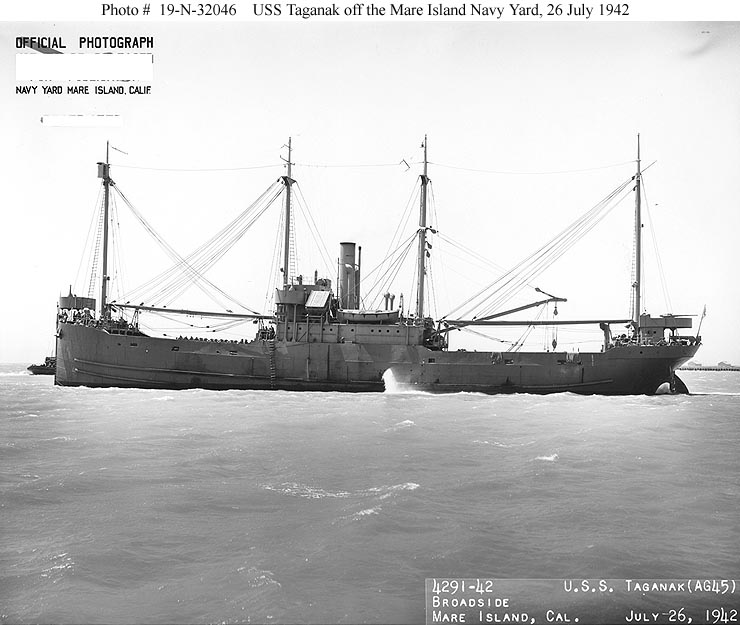
USS Taganak (AG-45)

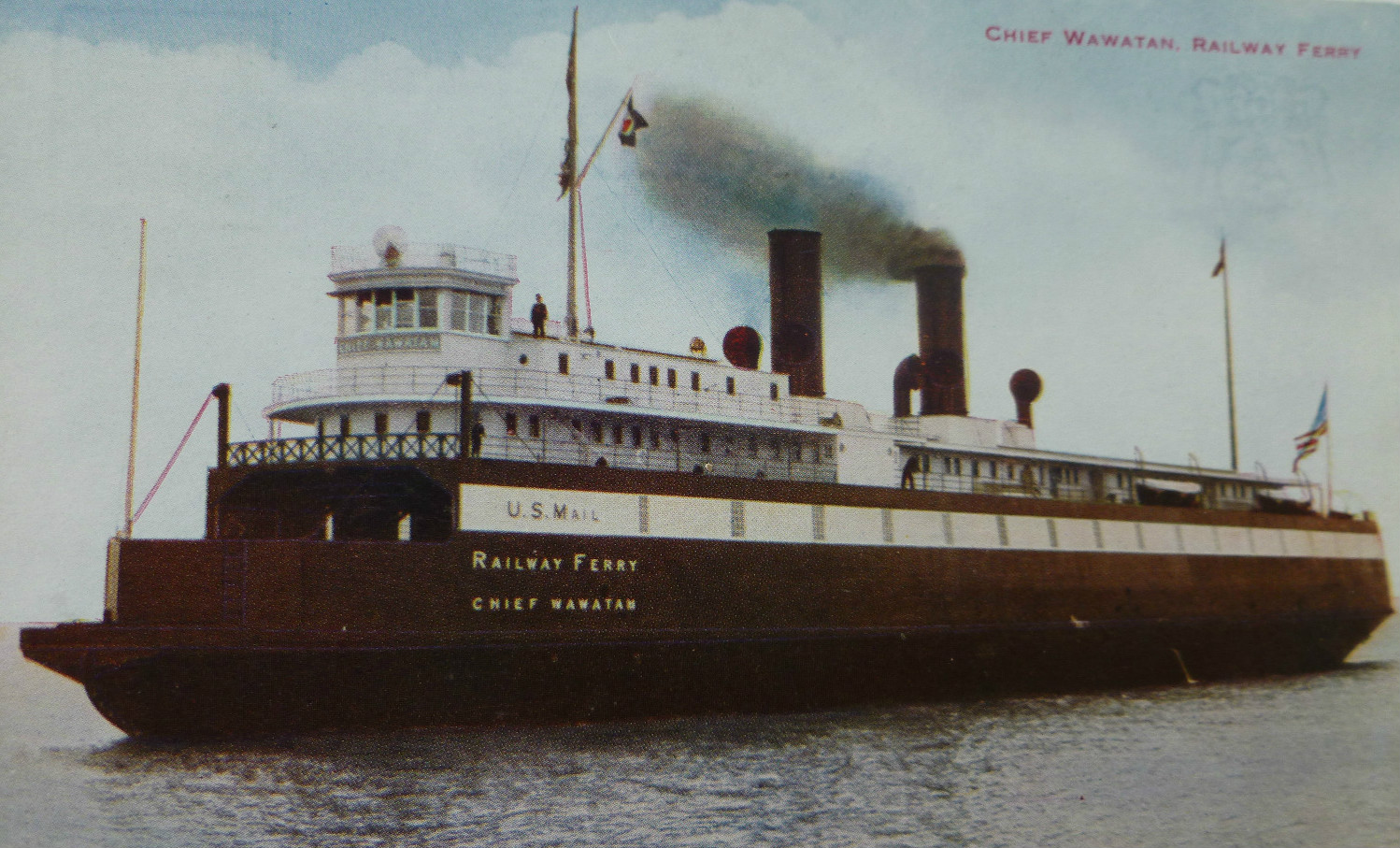
SS Chief Wawatam

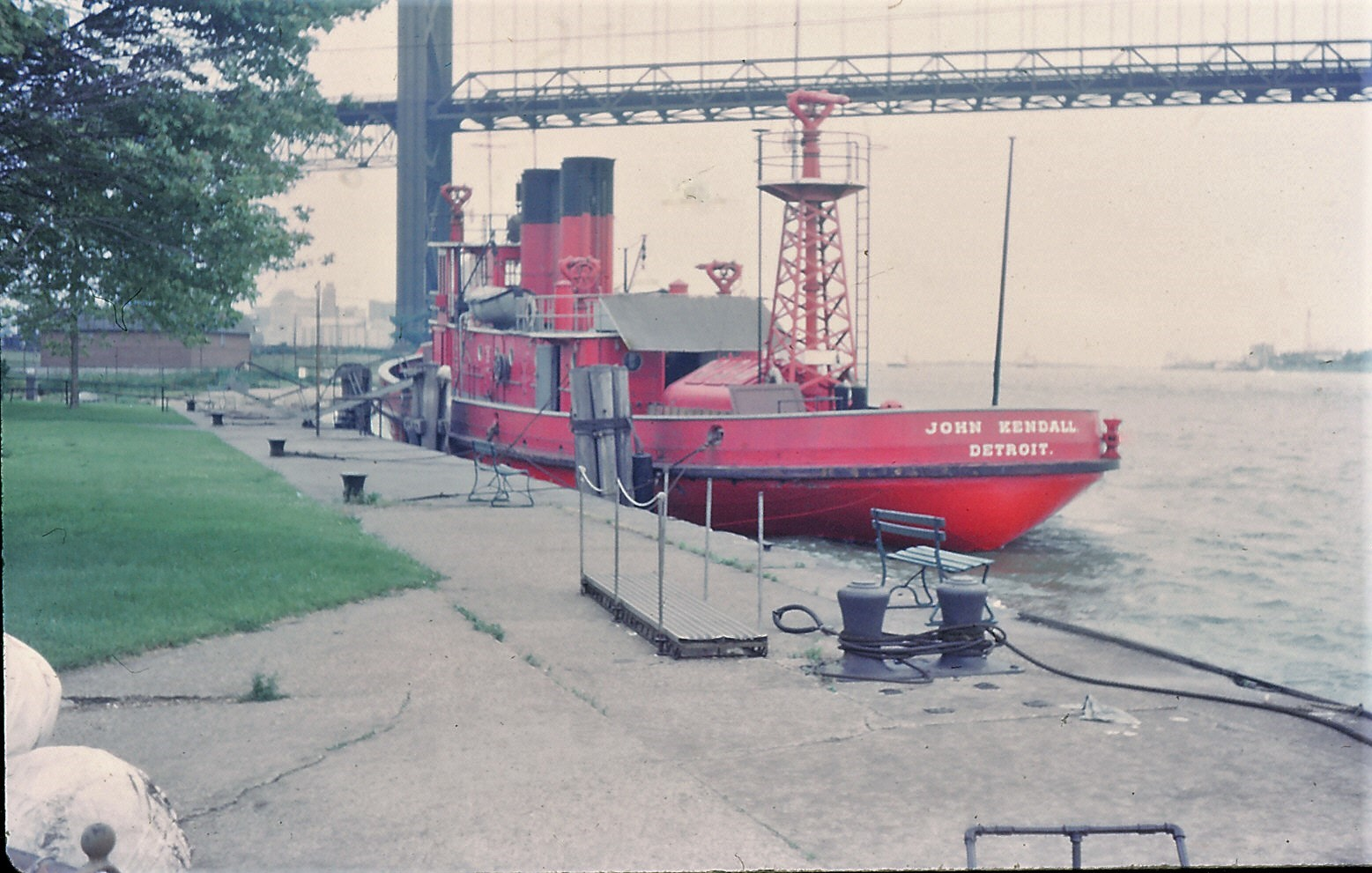
John Kendall steam-powered fire boat moored at Riverside Park Boat Launch in Detroit in July 1969.

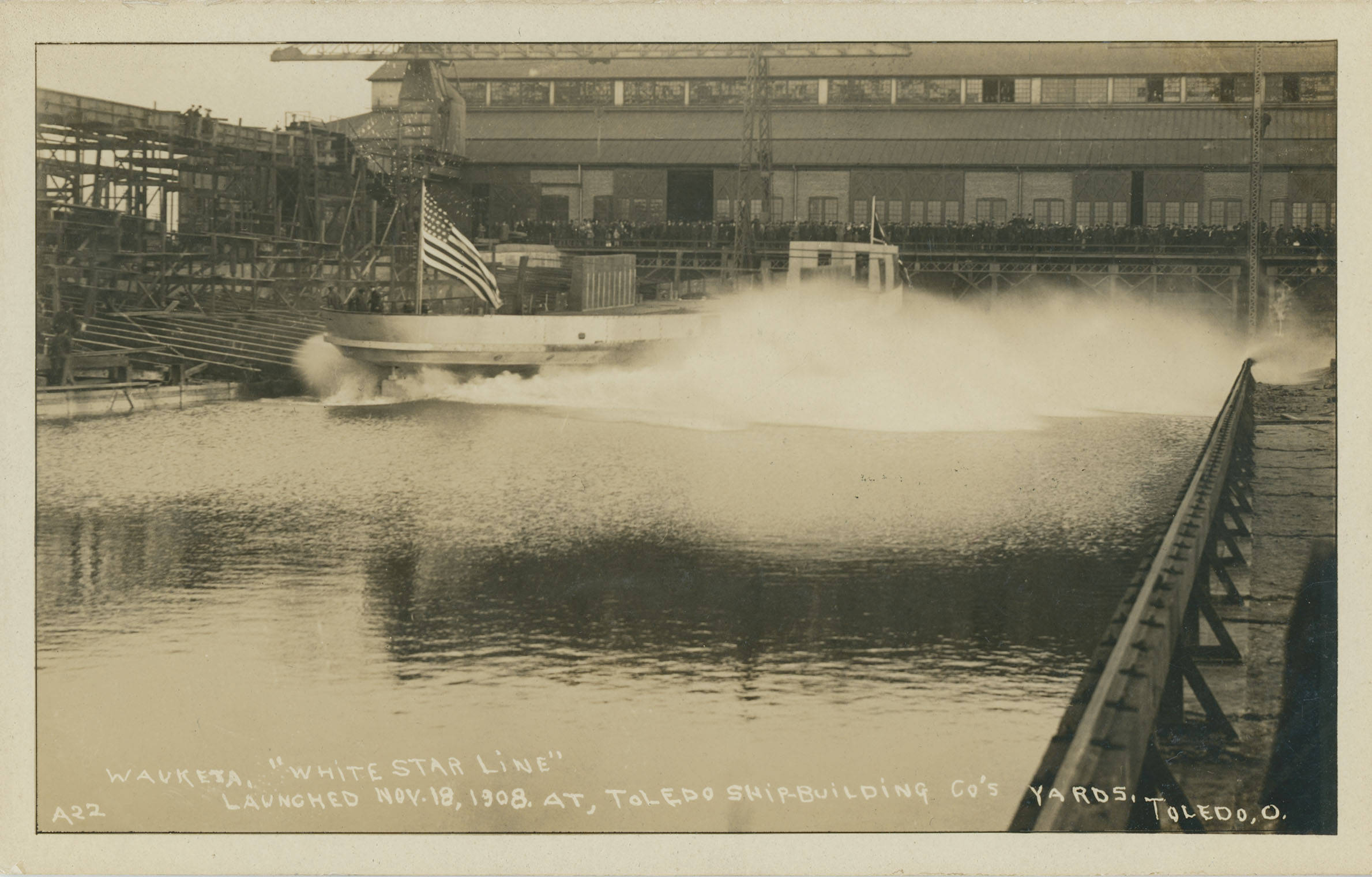
SS Wauketa, "White Star Line," Launched at Toledo Ship Building Company's Yards, Toledo, Ohio
