= USS Taganak =

Cargo ship of the United States Navy

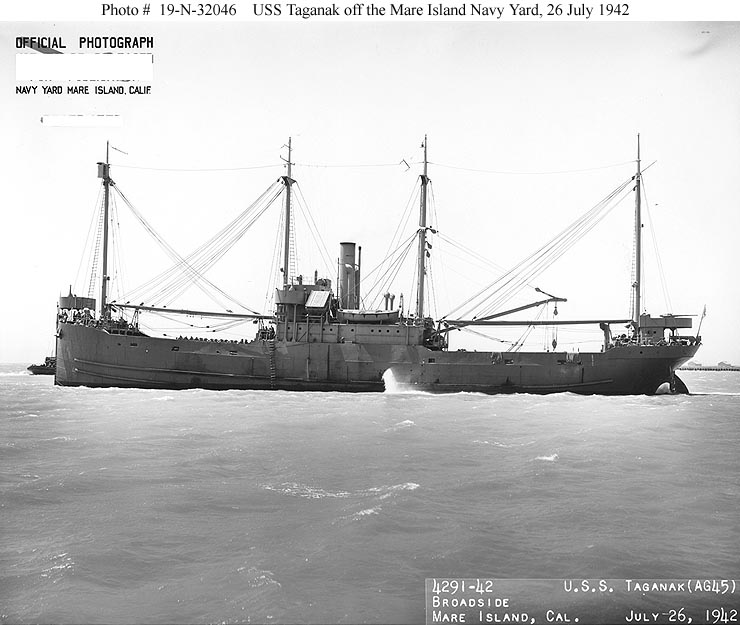
- USS Taganak (AG-45)

History

United States
- Name: War Shell (1917); Lakeshore civilian Lake Shore Navy (1917—1922); Olympic (1922—1943); Taganak (1943—1946); Olympic (1946—1947); Glento (1947); Pilhamn (1947—1954); Lulu (1954—1961)
- Namesake: Taganak Island
- Builder: Toledo Shipbuilding Company, Toledo, Ohio
- Yard number: 140
- Launched: 15 September 1917
- Completed: in 1917 as SS War Shell
- Acquired: by the Navy in 1918, and again on 23 May 1942
- Commissioned: 11 January 1918 as USS Lake Shore (ID-1792)
- Decommissioned: 5 March 1919
- In service: 23 July 1942 as USS Taganak (AG-45)
- Out of service: 25 March 1946, at Vallejo, California
- Stricken: 12 April 1946
- Identification: U.S. official number 215651
- Fate: Scrapped in February 1961 at Piraeus, Greece

General characteristics
- Type: Commercial cargo ship
- Tonnage: 1918; 1,977 GRT; 1,193 NRT; 1947; 1,876 GRT; 1,128 NRT
- Displacement: 3,000 tons
- Length: 261 ft (80 m)
- Beam: 44 ft (13 m)
- Draft: 19 ft (5.8 m)
- Propulsion: triple expansion reciprocating steam engine, single shaft, 1,150shp
- Speed: 10.2 knots
- Complement: 52 officers and enlisted
- Armament: World War I: 1 × single 5-inch gun mount; 1 × 6-pounder; World War II: 1 × 3-inch/50-caliber dual-purpose gun mount; 1 × 40 mm gun mount; 5 × 20 mm gun mounts

USS Taganak (AG-45) was a commercial cargo ship built in 1917 as War Shell for the British but requisitioned by the United States after its entry into World War I. The ship was renamed, Lakeshore according to civilian records but acquired by the Navy and commissioned as Lake Shore, to operate as a mine transport under the Naval Overseas Transportation Service (NOTS). On return to commercial service the ship operated as a timber transport on the U.S. West Coast as Olympic until acquired by the Navy for operation in World War II as Taganak. After decommissioning and lay up in the reserve fleet the Navy withdrew the ship for sale and scrapping; however the ship resumed commercial service as Olympic until sold to Panamanian service to be renamed Glento and then sold within the same year to a Swedish firm to operate as Pilhamn until 1954. Sold to a Lebanese firm the ship operated as Lulu until scrapped at Piraeus, Greece in February 1961.

== Construction ==
The ship was completed in 1917 by Toledo Shipbuilding Company, Toledo, Ohio, hull 140, as War Shell for the British Shipping Controller. War Shell was requisitioned by the United States Shipping Board (USSB), renamed Lakeshore (Note: Civilian references, including U.S. registry of 1918, use Lakeshore with only Navy related references using Lake Shore as the name under which the ship was commissioned.) and assigned the U.S. official number 215651 with signal letters LHWS.

== World War I service as Lake Shore ==
The ship was acquired from the USSB by the Navy for use as a mine carrier and commissioned as Lake Shore at Philadelphia, Pennsylvania, on 11 January 1918, and assigned to the Naval Overseas Transportation Service (NOTS). The ship was refitted at Philadelphia, Pennsylvania, armed with one 5-inch gun and one six-pounder, manned with a complement of 64, and got underway for Hampton Roads, Virginia, on 7 February. The ship loaded a cargo of coal there and sailed for Boston, Massachusetts, arriving on the 17th. After discharging her cargo, Lake Shore returned to Norfolk, Virginia, on the 27th. She then loaded coal and mines for the North Sea barrage, sailed for Scotland on 7 March, and arrived at Lamlash on the 29th.

The steamer returned to Norfolk, Virginia, on 5 May and sailed on the 18th for Boston where she received an extensive overhaul. On 17 June, she proceeded, via New York City, to Norfolk where she loaded mines and general cargo. Her convoy sailed on 27 June for Scotland and reached Corpach on 15 July.

Lake Shore returned to Norfolk on 18 August. She made two more trips from Hampton Roads to Europe—one back to the British Isles and one to France—before returning home on 6 February 1919. She was decommissioned on 5 March 1919 and returned to the Shipping Board the next day.

== Post-war decommissioning ==
In 1923 the ship was sold to the E. K. Wood Lumber Company, Inc., of San Francisco, California, and renamed Olympic. The steamer was operated by the lumber company along the Pacific coast until it was withdrawn from service in 1940.

== World War II service as Taganak ==
Early in World War II, to relieve its acute shortage of cargo ships, the Navy reacquired Olympic on 23 May 1942. Following repairs, alterations, and refitting at Mare Island, the ship was commissioned as Taganak (AG-45) on 23 July 1942.

Taganak, formally purchased on 28 September 1942, sailed for the South Pacific, via Pearl Harbor, in late October. Upon her arrival at Nouméa, New Caledonia, she was sent to New Zealand to return with a load of lumber. The ship then shuttled cargo between New Zealand, New Caledonia, New Hebrides, and the Solomon Islands for the next year.

=== Attacked by a Japanese submarine ===
On 19 August 1943, Taganak was a few hours out of Nouméa en route to Espiritu Santo with a cargo of ammunition when she was attacked by a Japanese submarine. HMNZS Tui attacked the enemy with depth charges and forced it to the surface. American dive bombers of Scouting Squadron VS-57 came to the assistance of the New Zealand corvette and aided in the kill of the Japanese submarine I-17. Rescue efforts succeeded in saving a few survivors.

On 26 October, Taganak stood out of Tutuila, American Samoa, and headed for the United States laden with copra. The ship arrived at San Pedro, California, on 19 November; discharged her cargo, and moved to Oakland, California, for an overhaul.

On 11 February 1944, Taganak sailed for the South Pacific to resume shuttling inter-island cargo. She put into Auckland, New Zealand, on 6 February 1945 for repairs and then plied the waters of the South Pacific Ocean carrying cargo until after hostilities with Japan ended. The old steamer departed Tutuila on 30 September and headed for the United States.

=== Decommissioning ===
Taganak arrived at San Francisco on 26 October 1945, decommissioned at Vallejo, California, on 25 March 1946 and struck from the Navy List on 12 April. The ship entered the reserve fleet in Suisun Bay, California on 30 June 1946 but removed by the Navy on 10 October 1946 for sale and scrapping to Pillsbury and Martignoni Co., San Francisco as the ship was "in very poor condition."

== Return to commercial operation ==
Instead of scrapping the vessel resumed the name Olympic with the U.S. registry information of 1947 showing Olympic with signal KDIV again owned by E. K. Wood Lumber Company. The ship was in 1947 to the Panamanian company Caribbean Land & Shipping Corporation and renamed Glento. Later in 1947 the ship was sold to Sven Dalen A/B of Stockholm, Sweden and renamed Pilhamn. In 1954 the ship was sold to the Levant Shipping Co. of Beirut, Lebanon operating as Lulu until scrapped in February 1961 at Piraeus, Greece.
