= Turtle Islands, Tawi-Tawi =

Municipality in the Philippines

Turtle Islands تاڬانق Taganak
- Municipality
- Municipality of Turtle Islands
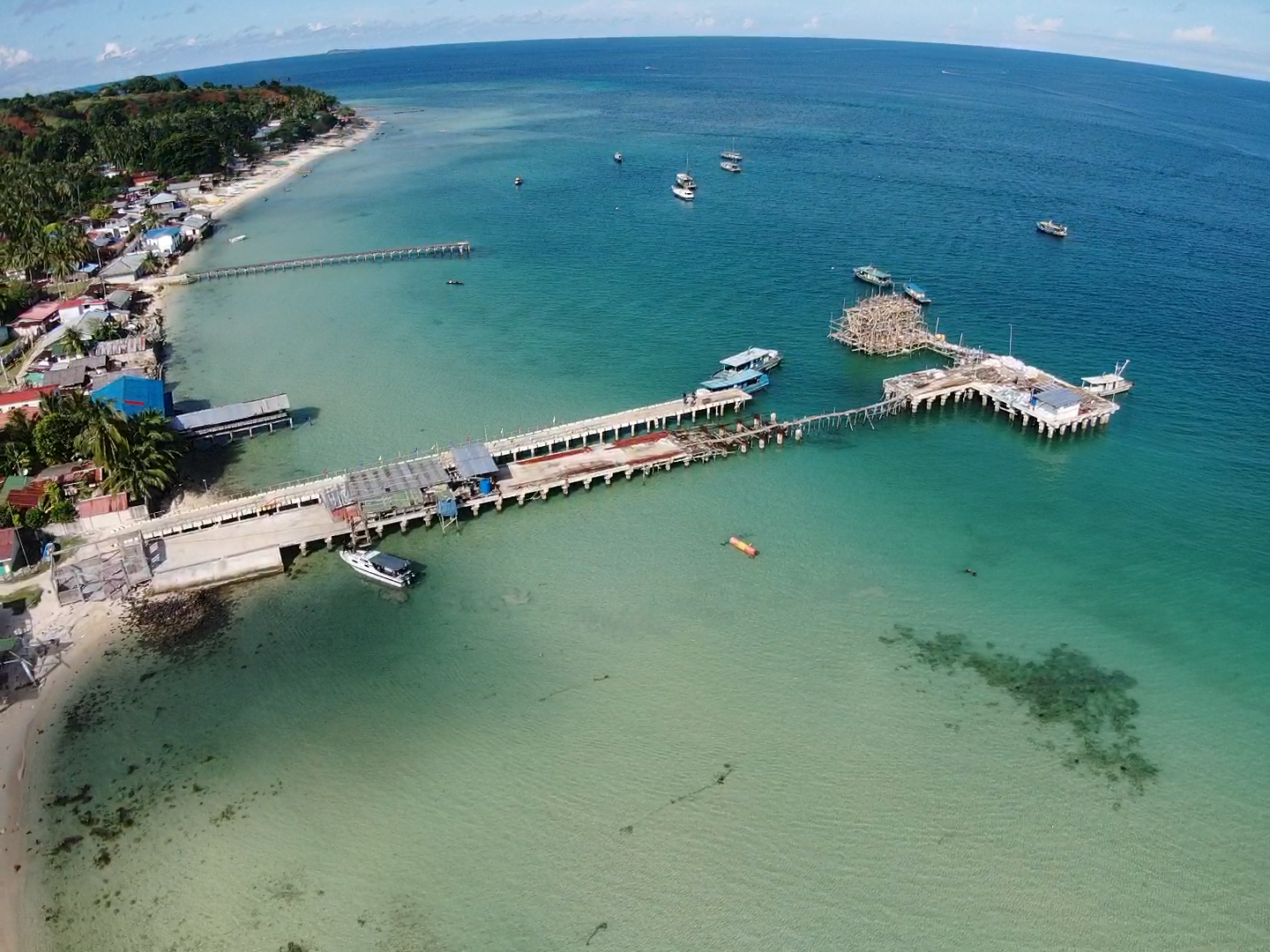
- Port of Taganak

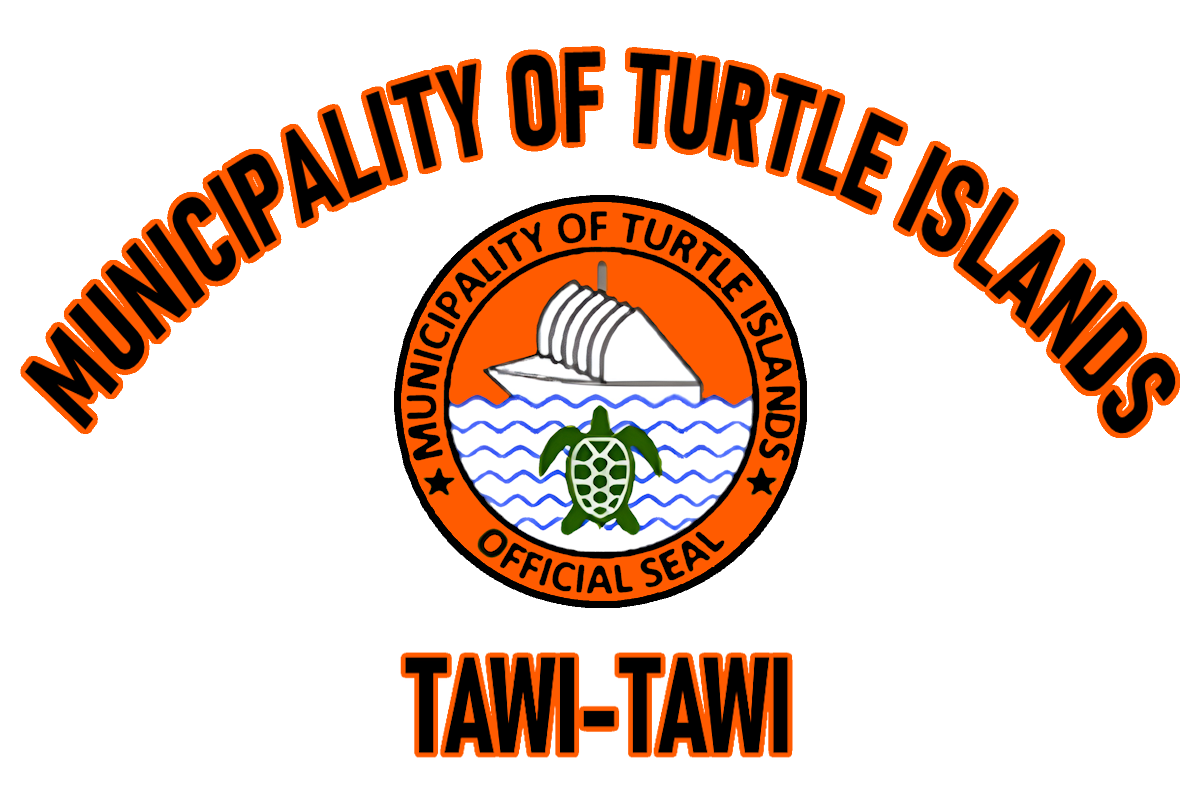
- Flag Seal

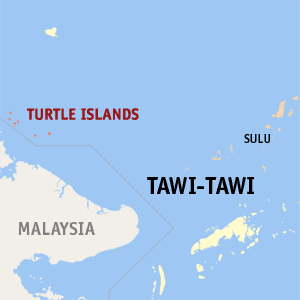
- Map of Tawi-Tawi with Turtle Islands highlighted
- Interactive map of Turtle Islands
- Location within the Philippines
- Coordinates: 6°04′23″N 118°18′43″E
- Country: Philippines
- Region: Bangsamoro Autonomous Region in Muslim Mindanao
- Province: Tawi-Tawi
- House district: Lone district
- Parliamentary district: 4th district
- Barangays: 2 (see Barangays)

Government
  - Type: Sangguniang Bayan
  - Mayor: Mohammad Faizal H. Jamalul
  - Vice Mayor: Suraida B. Ibnusali
  - House Representative: Dimszar M. Sali
  - Municipal Council: Members: Adzhar I. Puto; Michael J. Jaal; Mukim J. Hadani; Sulma A. Sarahadil; Abdulla M. Sangkula; Nurfaina J. Tadan; Hassan G. Aukasa; Abba N. Nur
  - Electorate: 8,734 voters (2025)

Area
  - Total: 62.50 km^{2} (24.13 sq mi)
- Elevation: 1.0 m (3.3 ft)
- Highest elevation: 226 m (741 ft)
- Lowest elevation: 0 m (0 ft)

Population (2024 census)
  - Total: 7,665
  - Density: 122.6/km^{2} (317.6/sq mi)
  - Households: 893

Economy
  - Income class: 5th municipal income class
  - Poverty incidence: 67.61% (2023)
  - Revenue: ₱ 78.49 million (2024)
  - Assets: ₱ 114.6 million (2024)
  - Expenditure: ₱ 79.09 million (2024)

Service provider
  - Electricity: Cagayan de Sulu Electric Cooperative
- Time zone: UTC+8 (PST)
- ZIP code: 7507
- PSGC: 1907008000
- IDD : area code: +63 (0)68
- Native languages: Sama; Tagalog; Sabah Malay
- Website: turtleislands.gov.ph

Turtle Islands, officially the Municipality of Turtle Islands (Sama: Lahat Pūꞌ Payukan; Tagalog: Bayan ng mga Pulo ng Pawikan, Bayan ng mga Pulong Pawikan, Bayan ng Kapuluan ng Pawikan, Bayan ng Kapuluang Pawikan; Filipino: Bayan ng Turtle Islands; Malay: Perbandaran Pulau Penyu, Perbandaran Kepulauan Penyu, is a municipality in the province of Tawi-Tawi, Philippines. According to the 2024 census, it has a population of 7,665 people, making it the least populated town in the province.

It is also known as Philippine Turtle Islands to distinguish it from its nearby Malaysian counterpart. Seven of the islands are part of the Philippines, of which Taganak is the largest.

Access to the Turtle Islands is difficult, as there are no regular means of transportation to the area. This has kept the islands protected from turtle egg poachers. A station for park rangers is also present on the islands. The island municipality and its surrounding waters form part of the Turtle Islands Wildlife Sanctuary.

== History ==
In the Treaty of Paris of 1898, Spain ceded to the United States of America "the archipelago known as the Philippine Islands". The terms of that treaty were supplemented by the Treaty of Washington of 1900. On the basis of this cession, the United States claimed sovereignty over the Philippine Turtle Islands and the Mangsee Islands, all of which were administered by the British North Borneo Company. Responding to the claim, the United Kingdom government said there was "no intention...to question the title of the United States" to the islands. However, the United Kingdom asked "whether the United States Government would be willing to forgo their right to these islands, out of consideration for the fact that the North Borneo Company had during many years carried on the administration of [the islands] under the apparent belief the islands formed part of the company's territory, and as the company attached importance to being permitted to retain control over them". Under a treaty concluded by exchange of notes dated 3 and 10 July 1907, the two countries agreed that the administration of the islands would continue to be carried on by the British North Borneo Company, with that arrangement to end should an international boundary treaty end it or should either government give the other government one year's notice.

By a further international treaty concluded in 1930 between the United States (in respect of its then-overseas territory of the Philippine Islands) and the United Kingdom (in respect of its then protectorate of the State of North Borneo), the two powers agreed the international boundaries between those respective dependencies. In that treaty the United Kingdom unambiguously accepted that Sibuang, Boaan, Lihiman, Langaan, Great Bakkungaan, Taganak and Banguan together called in that treaty the “Turtle Islands”, as well as the Mangsee Islands, were part of the Philippine archipelago and therefore under U.S. sovereignty. However, by a supplemental international treaty concluded at the same time, the two powers agreed that those islands, although part of the Philippine archipelago, would remain under the administration of the State of North Borneo's British North Borneo Company. The supplemental treaty provided that the British North Borneo Company would continue to administer those islands unless and until the United States government gave notice to the United Kingdom calling for administration of the islands to be transferred to the U.S. The U.S. never gave such a notice. On 4 July 1946, the Republic of the Philippines was declared, and became the legal successor to the U.S. under the treaties of 1930. On 15 July 1946 the United Kingdom annexed the State North Borneo and, in the view of the United Kingdom, became the sovereign power with respect to what had been the State of North Borneo.

On 19 September 1946, the Republic of the Philippines notified the United Kingdom that it wished to take over administration of the Turtle Islands and the Mangsee Islands. The British government responded by asking the Philippine government to reconsider "because these islands are so far from the nearest Philippine administrative base that...it would be in the best interests of both the Philippines and North Borneo for the latter to remain responsible for the administration of the islands." The British agreed to the Philippine request to establish a joint committee to examine the administration of the islands. The joint committee inspected the islands but ultimately on 24 September 1947, the Philippines made known its decision to proceed with assuming control of the islands. Pursuant to a supplemental international agreement, the transfer of administration became effective on 16 October 1947.

=== Taganak Lighthouse Dispute ===
The largest of the islands, Taganak, is near the entrance to Sandakan Bay. The lighthouse on the island, which was of practical importance to nearby North Borneo, became the subject of an international dispute known as the Taganak Lighthouse Dispute. The Treaty of Peace concluded in Paris between the United States and Spain on 10 December 1898, which ended the Spanish-American War. The 1930 international treaty dealing with the transfer of administration of the Turtle Islands including Taganak contained the following provision:

In the event of (the administration) of the Island of Taganak...being transferred, the United States Government will give favorable consideration to the question of the compensation to be paid to the (British North Borneo Company) in respect of the capital expenditure incurred by the company in connection with the lighthouse situated on the island, and that the United States Government will provide for the future maintenance of the lighthouse.

At the time of the transfer of the island the Philippine government rejected the British request that the Philippines pay for the cost of the lighthouse, and provide for its future maintenance. The Manila government asserted that the obligations contained in the 1930 treaty "presupposes naturally that the lighthouse be in working condition at the time of the transfer and that its operation is necessary and will provide some public benefit to the United States, or its successor, the Philippines". Manila asserted that the lighthouse had been severely damaged in the war, that it had been out of service since its destruction, and that the Philippines did not need its service. The government was willing to lease the site for the lighthouse to North Borneo for one peso per annum, as long as the United Kingdom needed and used the facility. The British view was that the Philippines was required under the terms of the 1930 treaty concerning the Turtle Islands to maintain the lighthouse in the future. On 26 May 1948, the British vice consul Linton Foulds stationed in Manila, wrote to the Philippine Secretary of Foreign Affairs, Joaquín Miguel Elizalde, calling again on the Philippine government to fulfil its obligations under the 1930 treaty as regards paying compensation for the lighthouse and providing for its operation as it remained in a state of ruin. On 23 July 1949 the Philippines responded in the same terms as it had at the time of the transfer. The parties remained in dispute. Prof. Vicente Abad Santos of the University of the Philippines and Lt. Col. Charles D.T. Lennhoff of the United States Army who reported on the Taganak Lighthouse Dispute in the American Journal of International Law assessed the arguments of the British and Philippine sides. They concluded that "the Philippine Government is justified in refusing to pay...and in refusing to provide for [the lighthouse's] maintenance".

The British North Borneo government transferred the offshore lands of Borneo—Taganak, Bakkungan, Bayaua, Sibauang, and Lihiman Islands—to the Philippines on October 16, 1947. The unveiling of the marker on Taganak Island on June 26, 1948, was attended by M.G. Combe, representing Great Britain; former President Diosdado Macapagal for the Philippines; Princess Tarhata Kiram for the Sultanate; and Governor Capt. Kalingalan Caluang, son of Panglima Caluang, for Sulu. Today, the abandoned lighthouse tower remains on the summit of the island.

=== Municipality status ===
Seal of the Turtle Islands when it was under the Province of Sulu, designed by the Philippine Heraldry Committee (1940-1972).

The Turtle Islands were constituted as a 'special municipal district' under the jurisdiction of the province of Sulu under Executive Order 95 signed by President Manuel Roxas on 13 October 1947. The same executive order proclaimed "the assumption of jurisdiction and administration by the Republic of the Philippines over the Turtle and Mangsee Islands which form part of Philippine territory". Under the executive order, a district officer was put in charge of administering the new special municipality.

The following year, Executive Order 130 was signed by President Elpidio Quirino providing for regular and more usual local government structures. The Turtle Islands were constituted as the "municipal district of Turtle Islands" to be governed by article VI, chapter 64, of the Revised Administrative Code. It was provided that the provincial board of Sulu shall act as council for the municipal district of Turtle Islands. The "district officer of Turtle Islands" was given the new title of "municipal district mayor of the Turtle Islands" and the same powers and duties which pertain to such official in other municipal districts organized under the provisions of article VI, chapter 64, of the Revised Administrative Code, in addition to those prescribed under Executive Order No. 95 in 1947.

=== Malaysian annexation allegation controversy ===
In 1988, Philippine press announced that Malaysia had annexed the islands. Three days of hype, supported by maps showing the annexation, died away when it was revealed that the "annexation" resulted from a Philippine naval official misreading an American naval chart. The officer mistook a deepwater ship route for the boundary of Malaysia's new economic zone.

== Geography ==
Features of the Turtle Islands.

The islands are located within the Sulu Sea at the south-western tip of the country, at the edge of the international treaty limits separating the Philippines and Malaysia. The seven islands from largest to smallest are:

- Taganak is of volcanic origin and the largest island of the group with an area of about 116 hectares (290 acres) with the highest point at 148 metres (486 ft).
- Boaan, also known as Boan, is the second largest island of the group with an area of 76 hectares (190 acres) with the highest elevation at 59 metres (194 ft).
- Great Bakkungaan also known as Great Bakkungan is the third largest at 51 hectares (130 acres) with the highest elevation at 58 metres (190 ft).
- Baguan is the easternmost of the islands and is also volcanic in origin. The bell-shaped island has an area of 29.1 hectares (72 acres) with the maximum elevation of 40 metres (130 ft).
- Lihiman is a mud and coralline island of about 29 hectares (72 acres). The island is noted for its explosive mud volcanoes extrusions (see below).
- Langaan is a flat coral island of about 7 hectares (17 acres) and a perimeter of 458 metres (1,503 ft).
- Sibaung is the westernmost island and is a small coral reef lying 4.5 miles (7.2 km) westward of the north part of Boaan Island. The island has an area of 0.1 hectares (0.25 acres) only. There are a few bushes 35 feet (11 metres) high on this reef.

Fresh water is reported available from shallow groundwater on all the islands except the smallest, Sibaung. Perhaps owing to its tiny size and the fact it does not have a fresh water source, Sibaung is sometimes omitted from the list of Philippine Turtle Islands. For example, Presidential Proclamation 171 establishing the Turtle Islands Wildlife Sanctuary refers to six islands rather than seven islands despite covering all of the municipality.

=== Barangays ===
Turtle Islands are politically subdivided into two barangays. Each barangay consists of puroks while some have sitios.

- Likud Bakkao
- Taganak Poblacion

=== Climate ===
Climate data for Turtle Islands, Tawi-Tawi
Month	Jan	Feb	Mar	Apr	May	Jun	Jul	Aug	Sep	Oct	Nov	Dec	Year
Mean daily maximum °C (°F)	28 (82)	28 (82)	29 (84)	30 (86)	30 (86)	30 (86)	30 (86)	30 (86)	30 (86)	30 (86)	29 (84)	29 (84)	29 (85)
Mean daily minimum °C (°F)	24 (75)	24 (75)	24 (75)	24 (75)	25 (77)	25 (77)	24 (75)	24 (75)	24 (75)	24 (75)	24 (75)	24 (75)	24 (75)
Average precipitation mm (inches)	128 (5.0)	87 (3.4)	87 (3.4)	58 (2.3)	88 (3.5)	89 (3.5)	82 (3.2)	80 (3.1)	81 (3.2)	110 (4.3)	110 (4.3)	140 (5.5)	1,140 (44.7)
Average rainy days	18.9	15.8	17.9	17.7	25.9	26.5	27.5	27.1	26.4	27.8	24.6	22.5	278.6
Source: Meteoblue

=== Mud volcanoes ===
In the Philippines, mud volcanoes are known to exist only on the Turtle Islands. Presence of these formations are evident on three of the islands - Lihiman, Great Bakkungaan and Boaan Islands. The hills on these islands are mostly mud volcanoes. On Great Bakkungan Island, grey mud quietly flows from the vent in a pulsating manner accompanied by gas bubbling. On Boan Island, mud extrusion had ceased by August 2000.

Compared to the other two islands, in Lihiman Island, a more violent extrusions of mud, mixed with large pieces of rocks occur that it has created a 20-m (66-ft) wide crater on the hilly part of the island. Such extrusions are reported to be accompanied by mild earthquakes and evidence of extruded materials can be found high up the surrounding trees because of its explosive character. Huge amount of materials are discharged from this volcano that drainage was cut on the northern slope of the hill to direct the flow to the sea. Submarine mud extrusions off the island have also been observed by local residents.

== Demographics ==
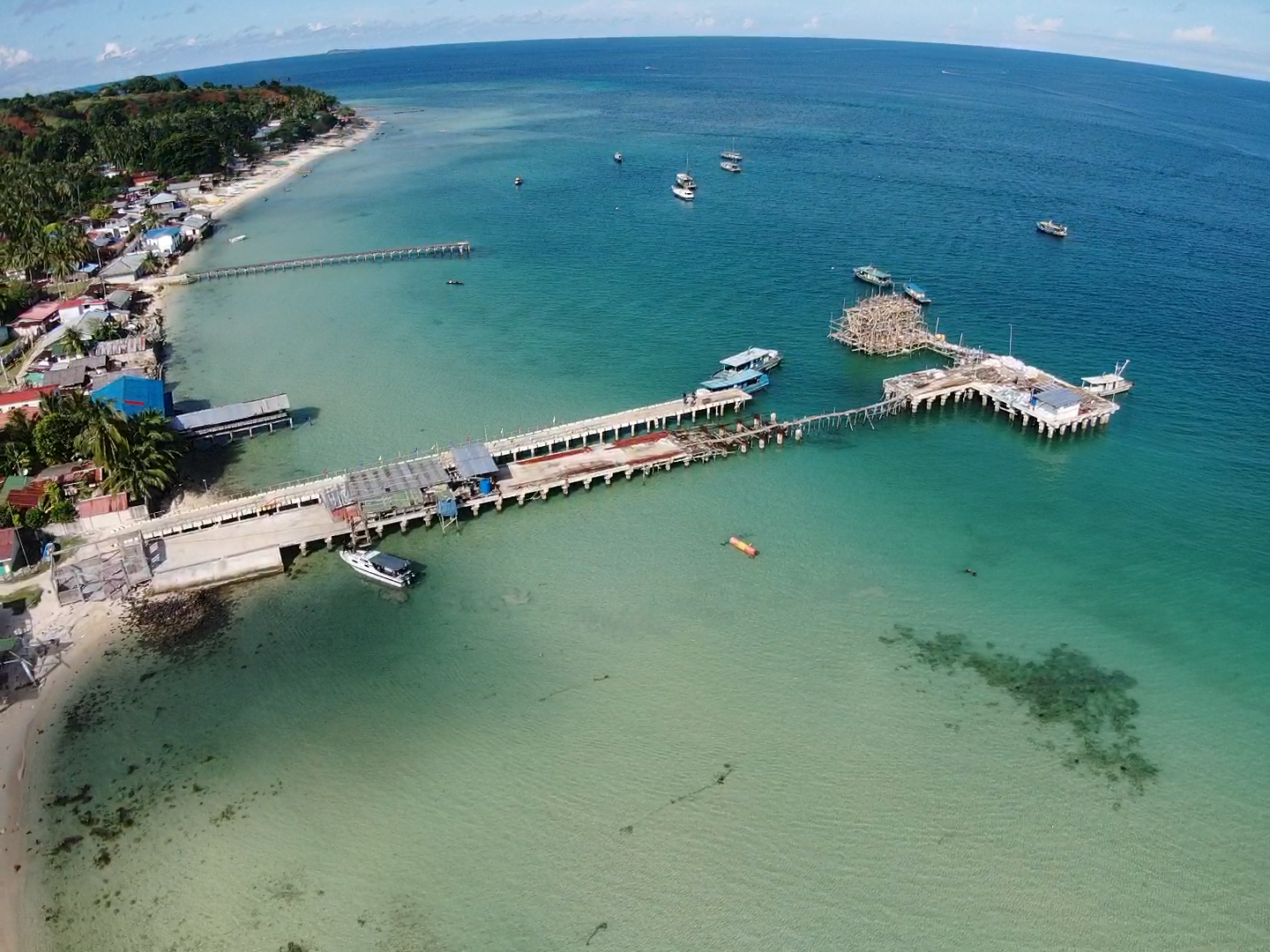
Port of Taganak

Population census of Turtle Islands
Year	Pop.	±% p.a.
1948	449	—
1960	536	+1.49%
1970	389	−3.15%
1975	799	+15.53%
1980	2,197	+22.41%
1990	2,296	+0.44%
1995	2,359	+0.51%
2000	3,600	+9.48%
2007	6,194	+7.77%
2010	3,772	−16.51%
2015	4,727	+4.39%
2020	5,683	+3.95%
2024	7,665	+7.45%
Source: Philippine Statistics Authority

Taganak, Boaan, Great Bakkungaan, Lihiman and Langaan are inhabited. Baguan, an island protected for turtle nesting and the smallest island, Sibaung, are uninhabited. According to the 2010 census, the population of the five permanently inhabited islands is 5,683 people. With a land area of only 3.08 square kilometres (1.19 square miles), the islands have a population density of 1,845.1/km^{2}. On the five inhabited islands the land cover in large areas is dominated by houses. Typical of other rural areas in the Philippines, human settlements are mixed with agriculture. The relative dominance of the settlements is mainly due to the limited land area and the resulting high population density level, which is more than four times the national average.

== Economy ==
Poverty Incidence of Turtle Islands

Source: Philippine Statistics Authority

== Agriculture and aquaculture ==
Natural land cover types in the islands are classified as wooded, mangrove, brush, grass and bare. Most of the areas on the five inhabited islands used for agriculture are planted with coconut. There is a seaweed and seagrass industry on the islands. Almost all species have some known economic value. Only those food species, when developed, are likely to be of immediate economic benefit to the local populations.
