= Design 1020 ship =

World War I steel-hulled cargo ship design

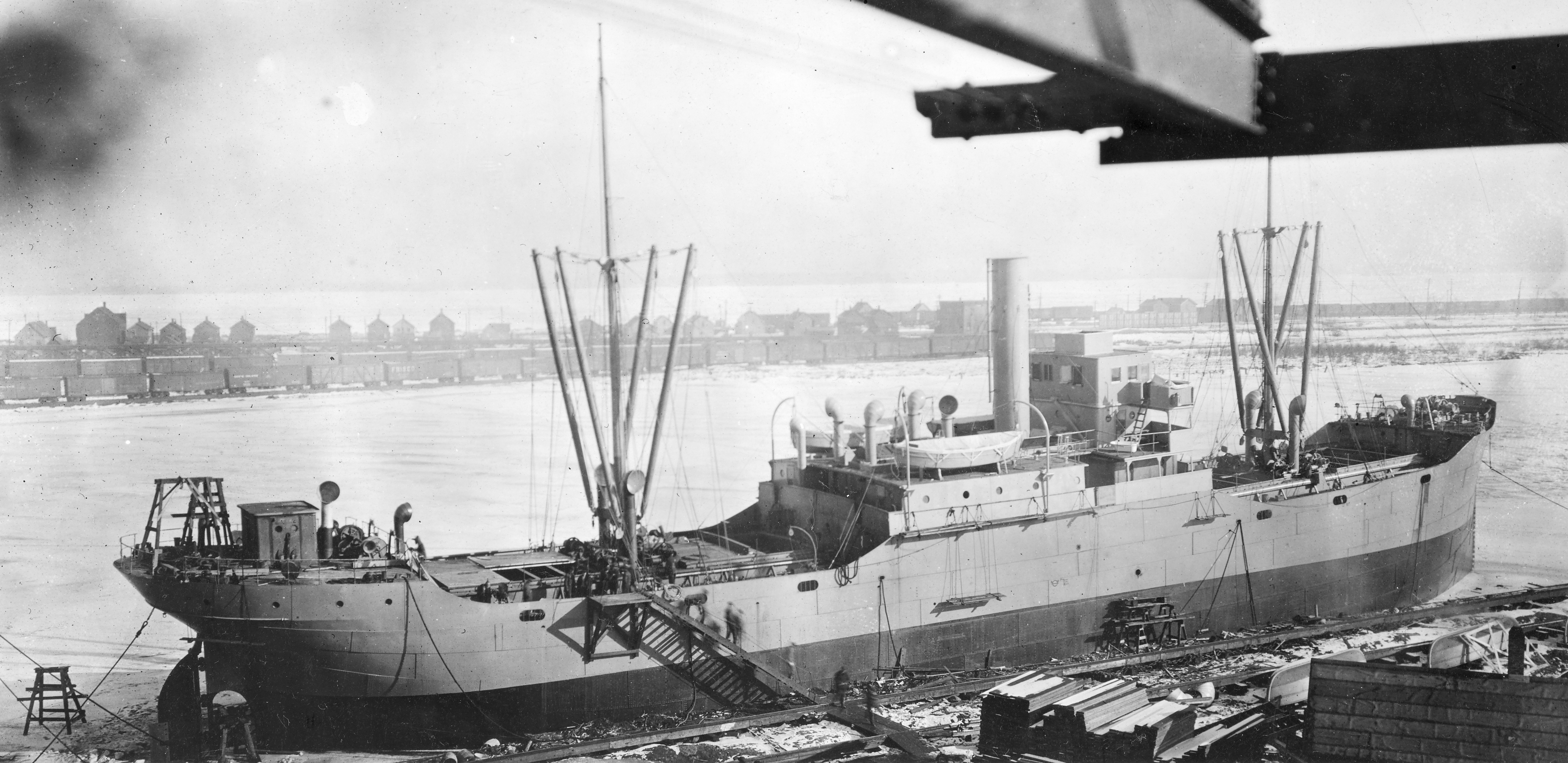
- SS Proctor fitting out at the Globe Shipbuilding yard in Superior, Wisconsin in early 1919

Class overview
- Name: EFC Design 1020
- Builders: American Shipbuilding Company; Superior Shipbuilding Company; Buffalo Shipbuilding Company; Chicago Shipbuilding Company; Detroit Shipbuilding Company; Globe Shipbuilding Company; McDougall Duluth Shipbuilding Company; Saginaw Shipbuilding Company; Toledo Shipbuilding Company
- Built: 1918–19 (USSB)
- Planned: 92
- Completed: 92

General characteristics
- Type: Cargo ship
- Tonnage: 3,500 dwt
- Length: 251 ft 0 in (76.50 m)
- Beam: 43 ft 5 in (13.23 m)
- Draft: 22 ft 5 in (6.83 m)
- Propulsion: Triple expansion engine, coal fuel

The Design 1020 ship (full name Emergency Fleet Corporation Design 1020) was a steel-hulled cargo ship design approved for mass production by the United States Shipping Board's Emergency Fleet Corporation (EFC) in World War I.

They were referred to as the "Laker"-type. Production was spread out over ten shipyards, the majority of which were owned by American Ship Building Company

- American Ship Building Company (21 ships), 10 at their Cleveland, Ohio shipyard and 11 at their Lorain, Ohio shipyard;
- Superior Shipbuilding Company (ASBC) (6 ships) at their Superior, Wisconsin shipyard;
- Buffalo Shipbuilding Company (ASBC) (5 ships) at their Buffalo, New York shipyard;
- Chicago Shipbuilding Company (ASBC) (9 ships) at their Chicago, Illinois shipyard;
- Detroit Shipbuilding Company (ASBC) (15 ships) at their Wyandotte, Michigan shipyard;
- Globe Shipbuilding Company (6 ships) at their Superior, Wisconsin shipyard;
- McDougall Duluth Shipbuilding Company (10 ships) at their Duluth, Minnesota shipyard;
- Saginaw Shipbuilding Company (12 ships) at their Saginaw, Michigan shipyard; and
- Toledo Shipbuilding Company (8 ships) at their Toledo, Ohio shipyard.

92 ships were completed for the USSB in 1918 and 1919. Engines were coal-fueled triple expansion engines.

== Bibliography ==
- McKellar, Norman L. "Steel Shipbuilding under the U. S. Shipping Board, 1917-1921, Part II, Contract Steel Ships" (PDF). Steel Shipbuilding under the U. S. Shipping Board, 1917-1921. ShipScribe.
