= Turtle Islands Wildlife Sanctuary =

National park and wildlife reserve in Tawi-Tawi, Philippines

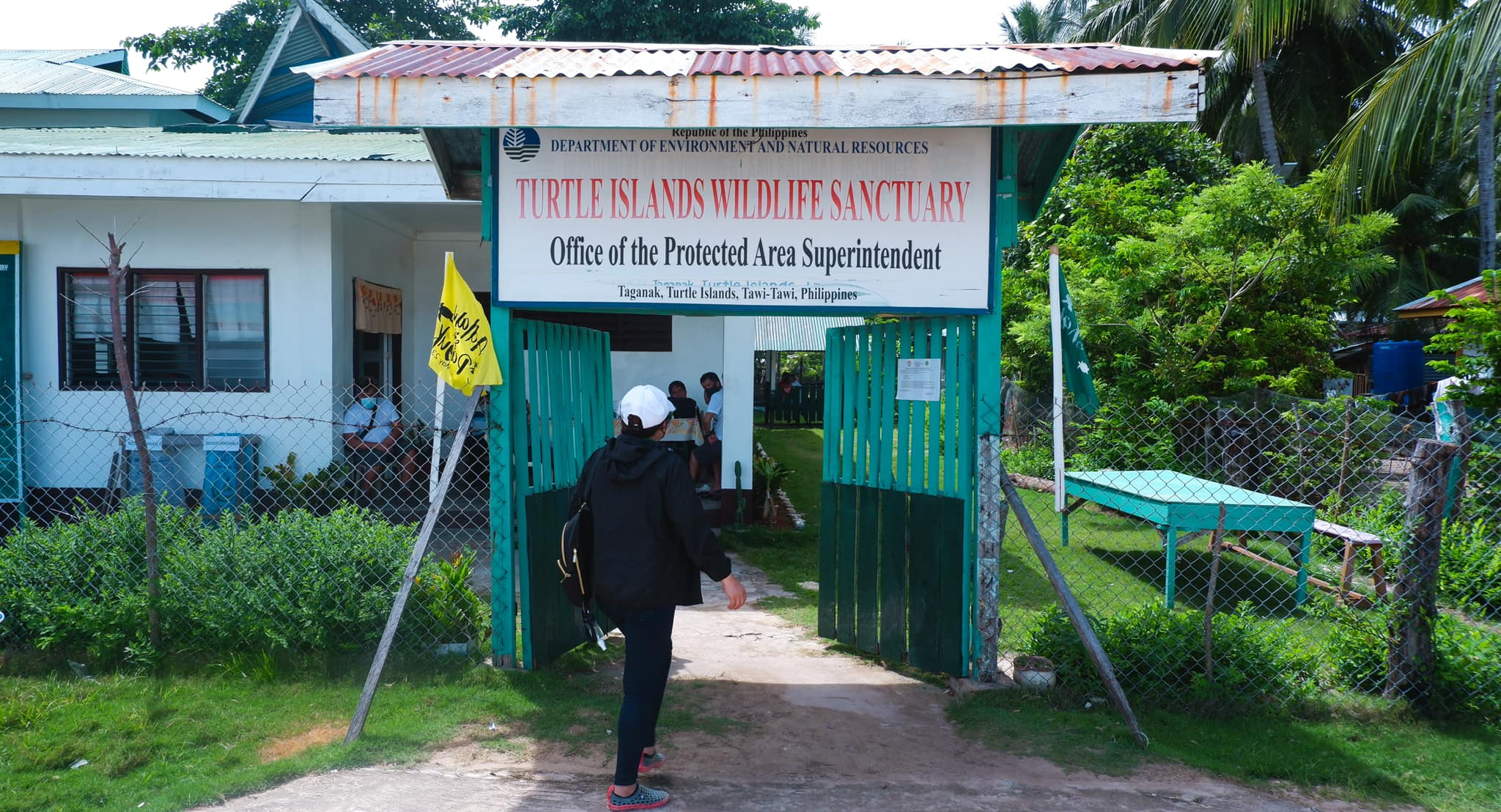
- Protected Area Superintendent's Office in Taganak
- Interactive map of Turtle Islands Wildlife Sanctuary
- Location: Turtle Islands, Tawi-Tawi, Philippines
- Area: 242,967 ha (938.10 sq mi)
- Designation: Protected Area
- Designated: August 26, 1999
- Administrator: Turtle Islands Protected Area Management Board; Ministry of Environment, Natural Resources and Energy

Turtle Islands Wildlife Sanctuary is a protected area encompassing the municipality of Turtle Islands in Tawi-Tawi, Philippines. It spans six islands: Great Bakkungan, Baguan, Boan, Langaan, Lihiman, and Taganak.

With a total area of 242,967 hectares, the sanctuary is situated between the Sulu and Celebes Sea, straddling the Malaysia–Philippines border. Except for uninhabited Langaan and Baguan, the islands are home to over 5,000 residents, with Taganak as the primary island.

== Background ==
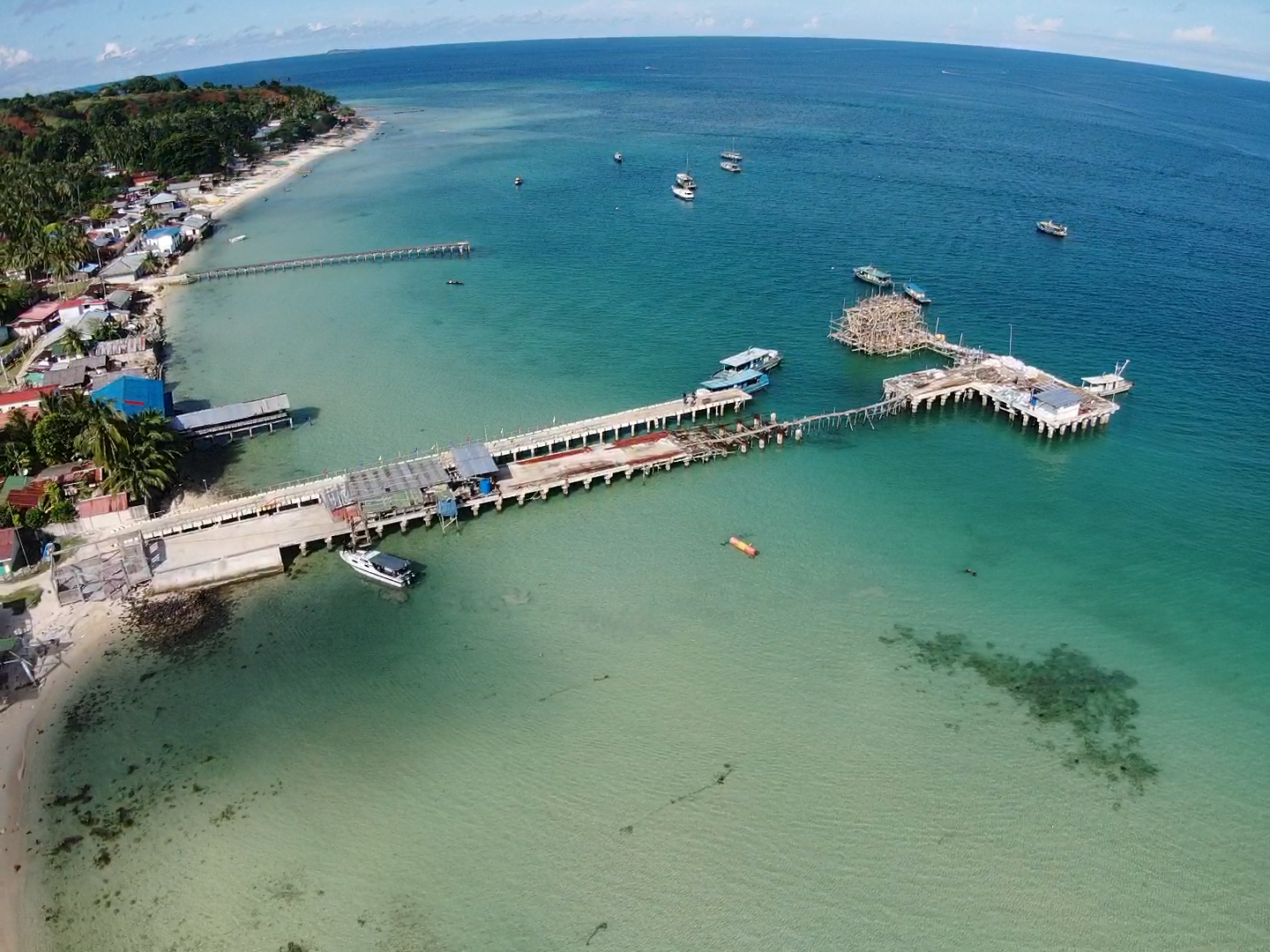
Port of Taganak

Together with three islands of neighbour country Malaysia and the surrounding coral waters, Turtle Islands are one of the world's few remaining major nesting grounds for the green sea turtles. In 1996, the islands were declared as Turtle Islands Heritage Protected Area by the governments of the Philippines and Malaysia as the only way to guarantee the continued existence of the green sea turtles and their nesting sites.

For the islands, the Philippine government decided to create special protection zones, and within these zones, only scientific and conservation activities are allowed. In other zones, certain rules are adapted to prevent too much impact by people on the environment and the turtles. Visiting these zones is only possible with strict guidance and under supervision of the staff of the officials of the government.

For a successful conservation and protection program, the support of the locals was very important. Fishing, for most of them, is the most important activity and source of income. Hunting sea turtles and collecting the turtle eggs for food, had always been a possible source for additional income. From the end of August to December, turtles come by the hundreds from the surrounding coastal waters, to lay and dig their eggs into the sand. The staff of the conservation project were able to succeed in convincing the locals the need to minimize their collecting activities. Local men, women and children, are now involved, helping with the protection activities.

Turtle Islands Wildlife Sanctuary was declared a national park under Republic Act No. 11038 (Expanded National Integrated Protected Areas System Act of 2018) signed by President Rodrigo Duterte in July 2018.

== Fauna ==
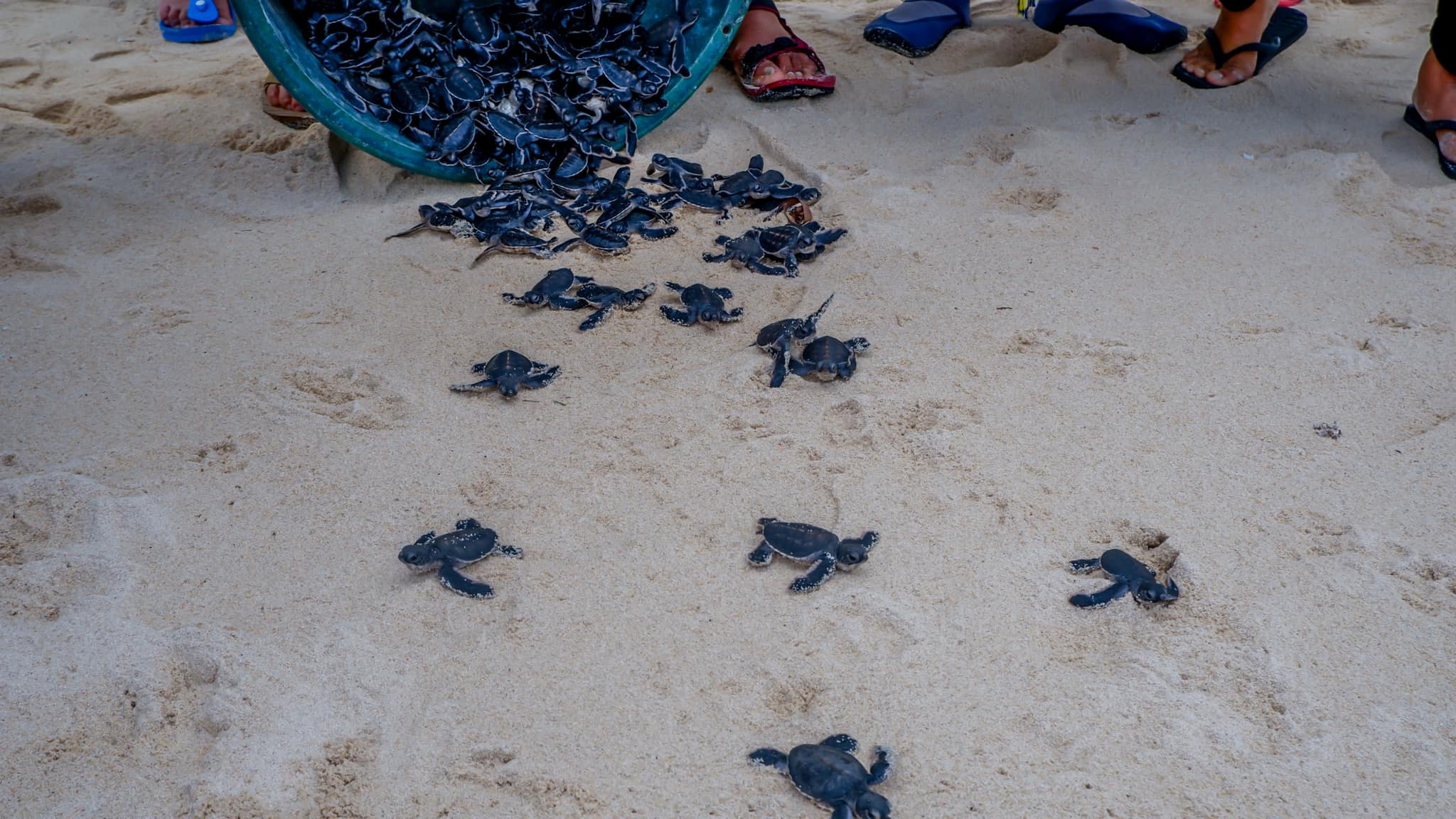
Turtle hatchlings being released in Baguan

The Turtle Islands Wildlife Sanctuary is a recognized nesting ground for the green sea turtle (Chelonia mydas) and the hawksbill sea turtle (Eretmochelys imbricata), both of which are endangered species. Among the sanctuary's islands, Baguan alone accounts for approximately 63% of all turtle nestings.

At least 71 species of birds were observed in the wildlife sanctuary. These include the vulnerable grey imperial pigeon (Ducula pickeringii), the near-threatened Mantanani scops owl (Otus mantananensis) and the Philippine megapode (Megapodius cumingii).

A possibility of a second otter species in the Philippines had been raised with the recording of two romps (two adults and one pup) of otters in the Turtle islands. Otters found in the island are most likely smooth-coated otters according to otter specialists. The other species that can be found in the Philippines is the Asian small-clawed otter, locally known as dungon in Palawan.

== Flora ==
Very little natural vegetation exists on the islands, except for Baguan and Langaan. Baguan is notable for its significant 89% coverage of beach forest while Langaan features smaller patches of beach forest. Additionally, there are limited areas of beach forest found on steep rock cliffs in Great Bakkungan and around the mud volcanoes in Lihiman.

Buchanania arborescens was the most common species encountered, followed by figs (Ficus spp.), Lumnitzera littorea, Excoecaria agallocha, Xylocarpus granatum, Xylocarpus moluccensis and Ceriops spp. In Bakkungan and Boan, Antidesma spp. grows in the grassland areas. Also, surrounding the active mud volcano on the northern section of Lihiman is a plantation of Casuarina equisetifolia.

== See also ==
- Turtle Islands National Park (Malaysia)
