= Taganak Island =

Island in Tawi-Tawi, Philippines

Native name: Pulo ng Taganak
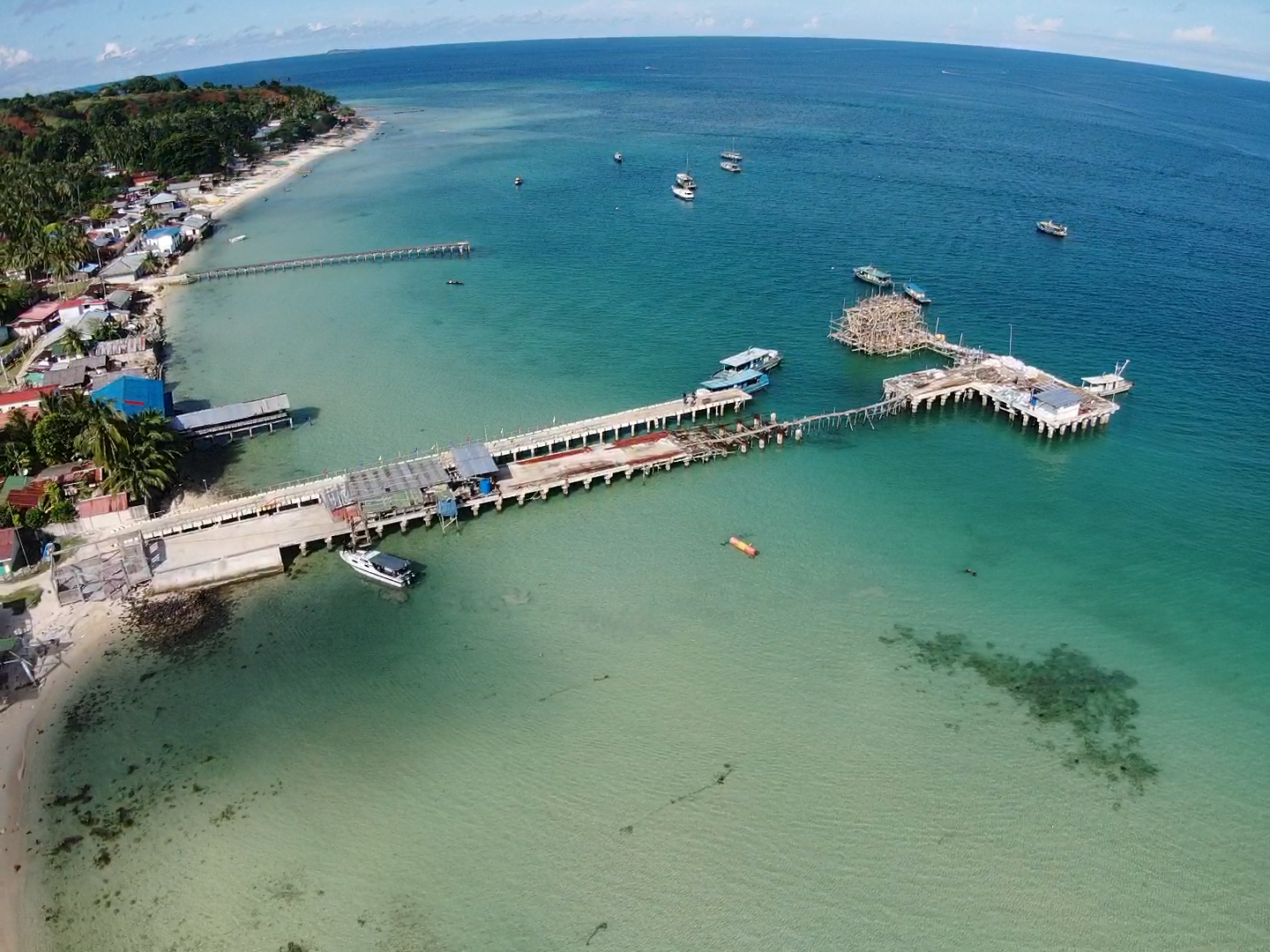
- Port of Taganak

- Location within Philippines

Geography
- Coordinates: 06°05′N 118°19′E
- Archipelago: Turtle Islands
- Adjacent to: Sulu Sea
- Area: 1.16 km^{2} (0.45 sq mi)
- Highest point: 148 metres (486 ft)

Administration
- Philippines
- Region: Bangsamoro Autonomous Region in Muslim Mindanao (BARMM)
- Province: Tawi-Tawi
- Municipality: Turtle Islands

Additional information

Taganak Island is a small tropical island surrounded by the Sulu Sea in the province of Tawi-Tawi, Philippines. The island is the largest of the seven Philippine Turtle Islands and it is served as administrative center of the Municipality of Turtle Islands.

== Geography ==
The island is at the very edge of the international treaty limits separating the Philippines from Malaysia. Taganak contains about 116 hectares (290 acres) with the highest point at 148 metres (486 ft). The island is about one mile in length.

== History ==
As one of the Philippine Turtle Islands the island enjoys the historical distinction of being territory that was not under Philippine administration at the time of independence in 1946. The State of North Borneo, a United Kingdom protectorate, administered the Philippine island. The Republic of the Philippines took over the administration of the island from the United Kingdom on 16 October 1947. The first Filipino district officer and police force to administer the Philippine Turtle Islands assumed their duties in Taganak on 22 October 1947.

The island is near the entrance to Sandakan Bay. The lighthouse on the island, which was of practical importance to nearby North Borneo, became the subject of an international dispute known as the Taganak Lighthouse Dispute. The 1930 international treaty dealing with the transfer of administration of the Turtle Islands including Taganak contained the following provision:

In the event of (the administration) of the Island of Taganak...being transferred, the United States Government will give favorable consideration to the question of the compensation to be paid to the (British North Borneo Company) in respect of the capital expenditure incurred by the company in connection with the lighthouse situated on the island, and that the United States Government will provide for the future maintenance of the lighthouse.

At the time of the transfer of the island the Philippine government rejected the UK request that the Philippines pay for the cost of the lighthouse and that they provide for its maintenance in the future. The Manila government asserted that the lighthouse had been severely damaged in the war, that it had not been in operation since its destruction, and that the Philippines did not need its service. The government was willing to lease the site for the lighthouse to North Borneo for one peso per annum, as long as the British needed and used the facility. The United Kingdom view was that the Philippines was required under the terms of the 1930 treaty concerning the Turtle Islands to maintain it in the future. Today, the abandoned lighthouse tower remains at the summit of the island.

On October 16, 1947, the British North Borneo government officially handed over the offshore lands of Borneo—Taganak, Bakkungan, Bayaua, Sibauang, and Lihiman Islands—to the Philippines. The unveiling of the marker on Taganak Island on June 26, 1948, was attended by M.G. Combe, representing Great Britain, former President Diosdado Macapagal for the Philippines, Princess Tarhata Kiram for the Sultanate, and Governor Capt. Kalingalan Caluang, son of Panglima Caluang, for Sulu. Capt. Kalingalan Caluang was one of the "fighting 21" of Sulu and a founder of Ansarul Islam, alongside Domocao Alonto, Rashid Lucman, Salipada Pendatun, Hamid Kamlian, Udtog Matalam, and Atty. Macapantun Abbas Jr. President Elpidio Quirino spent two hours on 22 May 1951 visiting Taganak Island. The President visited the marker on the spot where the Philippine flag was raised during the ceremonies at the turnover by the British of the administration of the Turtle Islands to the Philippine government. He also inspected the deposits of turtle eggs whose collection and sale had since been undertaken by the Philippine Government, and looked into the island’s main industry — copra. The President also visited the second biggest island in the group, Baguan, where most of the turtle eggs are gathered. He spent here another hour inspecting the turtle egg industry.

On 8 November 1962 the then-Mayor of Taganak, Timbayan Anam, fled 18 miles (29 km) to Sandakan on a kumpit with his family and five policemen, including the chief of police, following an apparent attack by 20 men. The Sandakan police alerted the Philippine military at Bongao.

At a time of increased tension between Philippines and Malaysia, the presence of Philippine troops on Taganak Island was cited as threatening in a 1968 speech made in the Malaysian parliament by Prime Minister of Malaysia, Tunku Abdul Rahman. In the aftermath of strained relations between the Philippines and Malaysia in 2013 when many Filipinos were being deported from Sabah, approximately 400 Filipinos from Sabah became briefly stranded on the island.

== Government and ownership ==
The island is part of the barangay of Taganak Poblacion which had a population of 2,430 at the time of the 2010 census. Its serves as the administrative center of the municipality of the Turtle Islands. There is an elementary school on the island which had 662 students in the 2013/2014 academic year. Taganak National High School also provides second level education on the island.

The island is part of the Turtle Islands Wildlife Sanctuary established on 12 August 1999 by Presidential Proclamation 171. There is a turtle hatchery on the island. There is no electricity supply on the island. The island is owned by the State. In 2014 plans to build a hotel and tourist cottages to boost 'ecotourism' and accommodate tourists for the Turtle Island Wildlife Sanctuary were approved. The Protected Area Management Board approved a resolution for the construction of a Php 28 million Hotel to be built on Taganak Island.

== Crime and piracy ==
The Abu Sayyaf criminal terrorist group who specialise in kidnap for ransom was active in the vicinity of the island. In 2017 it was reported they had abducted six Vietnamese off Taganak Island. The island is also a transit point for smuggling of goods including turtle eggs. The island has also been cited as a transit point for illegal migration into Malaysia. There is a maritime police station and coast guard station for the security of the island.
