= Turtle Islands National Park =

National park in Malaysia

Turtle Islands Park
- IUCN category II (national park)
- Location within Borneo
- Location: Sabah, Malaysia
- Nearest city: Sandakan
- Coordinates: 6°08′58″N 118°3′15″E
- Area: 17 km^{2} (6.6 sq mi)
- Established: 1977
- Governing body: Sabah Parks

Turtle Islands Park (Taman Pulau Penyu) is located within the Turtle Islands, which lie in the Sulu Sea some 3 kilometres (1.9 miles) north of Sandakan in Sabah, Malaysia. It consists of 3 islands - Selingaan, Little Bakkungan and Gulisaan (often spelt with -an instead of the traditional -aan), including the surrounding coral reefs and ocean. The Park is noted for its green turtles and hawksbill turtles which lay their eggs on the beaches of the islands. The Park covers an area of 17.4 km². The name Turtle Islands, however, refers to 10 islands, 3 of which are part of Turtle Islands Park of Malaysia, and 7 which belong to the Turtle Islands Wildlife Sanctuary of Tawi-Tawi province, Philippines.

On 1 August 1966, the first turtle hatchery in Malaysia was established on Selingan, funded entirely by the Sabah state government. Turtle hatcheries on the remaining two islands followed shortly after. In 1972, Selingan, Bakkungan Kechil and Gulisan were designated as a Game and Bird Sanctuary. In 1977, this status was upgraded to that of a Marine Park. Permanent park staff monitor the turtles, protect the hatcheries and tag the turtles for research purposes. Libaran Island is also designated within the park boundaries, however it is not a major turtle hatching spot.

Turtle Islands Park is administered by Sabah Parks.

== Selingan Island ==
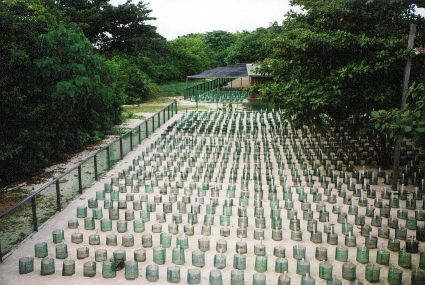
Turtle breeding

Only on Selingan are there chalets for overnight visitors, and those who wish to see the turtles laying eggs must stay overnight. A curious fact of the three islands is that turtles come ashore nightly, not only during certain seasons and thus one is virtually guaranteed to see them. During the peak season (October) up to 50 turtles come ashore to lay eggs.

However, park rules and regulations are strictly enforced and visitors are not allowed on the beach from sunset to sunrise so as not to disturb the turtles. A ranger will call all visitors to observe only one turtle laying eggs per night. The eggs are collected and the visitors vacate the beach immediately so as not to scare away other turtles, which are very sensitive to movement on the beach. After the laying and collection of eggs, and eventual tagging of the turtle if it is a first-time visitor, tourists are allowed into the hatchery to observe the further work of the rangers: the transplantation of the freshly laid eggs into a man-made incubation chamber. The chamber is no different from that of the turtle: between 60–75 cm deep, in the sand, but within a protected hatchery to make it impossible for natural predators to dig the nests open. Since temperature determines the sex of the turtles part of the hatchery is shaded, while the rest remains under the open sun.

After the transplantation of the eggs visitors will get turtle hatchlings – baby turtles – to release into the sea, which is also done by night to further increase their chances of survival.

Not all nests are emptied by the park rangers, but some remain undisturbed and develop naturally. By conserving the turtles the park does not want to endanger other wildlife on the island: many animals that are natural predators of the turtles such as monitor lizards, a crab specialising in turtle hatchlings, eagles and other birds, and marine animals such as sharks. They need the turtles for their survival.

The turtle conservation programme in Sabah is the oldest in the world and with the most detailed statistics and research. Marine turtles have been around for 230 million years at least, but because of human activities they have been brought, over the past hundred years, to the brink of extinction.
