= Timeline of events related to Abu Sayyaf (2016) =

This article contains a timeline of events from January 2016 to December 2016 related to the IS-linked Abu Sayyaf. This article contains information about the events committed by or on behalf of the Abu Sayyaf, as well as events performed by groups who oppose them.

== Timeline ==
=== January ===
- 14 January – A member of Abu Sayyaf who was believed to have been involved in the 2000 kidnappings over Sipadan was arrested by Philippine authorities.

=== February ===
- 6 February – Another Abu Sayyaf member who has allegedly been linked to the 2000 kidnappings over Sipadan and Davao Pearl Farm incidents was killed during a clash with Philippine police and military personnel who sought to arrest him in Indanan, Sulu.
- 20 February – Three Abu Sayyaf members was killed during a clash with MNLF.

=== March ===
- 23 March – A young Chinese-Filipino businessman along with his grandfather were abducted by six ASG gunmen who posed as police agents at Purok San Francisco, Brgy. Maruing, Lapuyan, Zamboanga del Sur.
- 25 March – Three Abu Sayyaf members was killed during a clash with MILF.
- 28 March – Ten Indonesian nationals were abducted by Abu Sayyaf gunmen off the waters of Sulu.

=== April ===
- 1 April – Four Malaysians aboard a tugboat from Manila were kidnapped when they arrived near the shore of Ligitan Island, while leaving other crews unharmed comprising three Myanmar nationals and two Indonesians.
- 8 April – An almost 10-hour long intense firefight happened in Tipo-Tipo, Basilan. Eighteen soldiers were killed while 52 government troops were wounded. Five Abu Sayyaf fighters were also killed in the encounter, including one foreign terrorist - a Moroccan national identified as Mohammad Khattad. See Battle of Tipo-Tipo.
- 15 April – Two Indonesian tugboats from Cebu, named the Henry and the Cristi, with 10 passengers, were attacked by Abu Sayyaf militants. Four passengers were kidnapped, while another five were safe. One of the passengers was injured after being shot but was later rescued by Malaysian Maritime Enforcement Agency when they arrived in the waters of Malaysia.
- 26 April – Canadian hostage John Ridsdel, one of four hostages kidnapped by the Abu Sayyaf group on Samal Island last September, was beheaded.
- 27 April – President Benigno Aquino III revealed that the ASG had plotted to kidnap his sister Kris Aquino and Sarangani Rep. Manny Pacquiao. In a statement sent to the media, Aquino said the ASG planned such attempts as part of their efforts to catch the attention of the international terrorist group Islamic State or ISIS.
- 28 April – An aerial bombardment and shelling of known Abu Sayyaf positions in Sulu resulted in the death of 14 terrorists.
- 30 April – Government forces recovered an arms cache and a speedboat belonging to the ASG during operations in Mardanas and Panguan Islands in Tawi-Tawi.

=== May ===
- 1 May – Ten Indonesians hostages who were abducted last 28 March are freed by the ASG. A source said a P50-million ransom was paid to the kidnappers.
- 3 May – ASG bandits freed Yahong Tan Lim, a Chinese woman who was kidnapped on 22 May 2014.
- 11 May – Another four Indonesians hostages who were abducted on 15 April were released with the help of the Philippine government.
- 14 May – An ASG member was arrested by authorities in Zamboanga City. The suspect was identified as Regin Onsing Nazirin. The suspect was allegedly involved in the kidnapping of plantation workers of Golden Harvest in Brgy. Tairan in 2001.
- 17 May – ASG gunmen freed Ryan Nuñeza Tan, a young Chinese-Filipino businessman near Cawa-Cawa Boulevard a few meters away from regional police office Camp Batalla. Tan was reunited with his family Wednesday night and escorted home to Lapuyan, Zamboanga del Sur. Tan were separated to his 70-year-old grandfather while in captivity in Sulu.
- 18 May – Seven soldiers were injured after ASG militants hurled a grenade to their truck. The soldiers were about to return to their camp from Jolo port after buying supplies and fetching their companions when a grenade was thrown to their truck upon reaching Plaza Marina. The injured soldiers were rushed to the hospital before being airlifted to a military hospital at Camp Navarro in Zamboanga City.
- 18 May – The AFP is redeploying a battalion of marine troops to beef up the coastal security in the province of Tawi-Tawi. The Marine Battalion Landing Team-9 (MBLT-9) will be pulled out from Zamboanga City and will be deployed in Tawi-Tawi.
- 21 May – Malaysian authorities detained 14 people believed to have links to the Islamic State (IS) and the Abu Sayyaf in a series of raids across several states between 17–20 May.
- 24 May – Malaysian government has appealed to Philippine authorities to extradite the two detained ASG criminals.
- 25 May – Philippine troops captured an ASG camp in Sulu. The troops seized the camp who is headed by Idang Susukan. The troops found gun parts, personal belongings and a motorcycle. No casualties were reported on the government side while undetermined people injured on the terrorist's side.
- 25 May – Indonesia's most wanted fugitive Santoso attempted to buy weapons from the ASG. Santoso's courier was arrested by the Indonesian authorities.
- 26 May – A soldier was killed while another was wounded in a firefight with armed men believed to be from the ASG in Sulu.

=== June ===
- 2 June – Two ASG militants were captured by the authorities in Zamboanga City.
- 8 June – Four Malaysians who were abducted on 1 April are freed by the ASG militants.
- 13 June – Canadian hostage Robert Hall was executed after the P600 million ransom was not paid.
- 17 June – battalions from Philippine Marines, Army, Air Force and Navy are sent to Sulu to hunt down the ASG.
- 21 June – A 1-hour long encounter occurred in Patikul, Sulu. The encounter resulted in 16 soldiers wounded and 3 ASG militants killed. The casualties grew to 7 militants killed and 18 soldiers wounded compared to the casualties reported by the military.
- 21 June – A cargo ship headed to Indonesia was hijacked by suspected ASG members. Seven crew members were abducted. In August 2016, one of those abducted, Mohammad Safyan, was able to escape his captors by running and swimming out to sea off Jolo island. While another one was released on 22 September.
- 24 June – Filipina hostage Marites Flor was freed.

=== July ===
- 1 July – Two suspected ASG militants were arrested in Basilan.
- 6 July – Suspected ASG militants led by Furuji Indama and Isnilon Hapilon attacked a village in Tipo-Tipo, Basilan. The attack targeted the headquarters of the 18th IB.
- 6 July – A trader kidnapped a year ago was freed by the ASG in Parang, Sulu.
- 7 July – An encounter between gov't forces and ASG militants in Patikul, Sulu resulted in 10 people killed and 25 wounded.
- 9 July – Three Indonesians fishermen was kidnapped near the coast of Lahad Datu, Sabah, Malaysia.
- 11 July – Gov't troops killed 40 ASG militants and injured 25 others as their offensive continues.
- 14 July – Suspected ASG militants killed three Marines in Indanan, Sulu.
- 18 July – Five Malaysian sailors were abducted near the coast of Lahad Datu, Sabah, Malaysia.

=== August ===
- 3 August – One Indonesian sailor was kidnapped in the waters of Malaysia, leaving other two crews unharmed but the incident was only reported by victims on 5 August.
- 9 August – Four Abu Sayyaf members killed in clash with MNLF who are trying to release the Indonesian hostage.

=== September ===
- 10 September – Three Filipino fishermen was kidnapped in the shores of Pom Pom Island in Sabah, Malaysia.
- 17 September – The three Indonesians fishermen that was kidnapped on 9 July from Sabah were released.
- 27 September – One Malaysian boat-skipper was kidnapped from his trawler by seven armed Filipino militant before the group attacking another Indonesian trawler but no kidnapping were committed in the second incident. The boat-skipper was released on 1 October with no ransom been asked, along with three Indonesians hostages that was released in the same day.

=== October ===
- 21 October – Around 10 Abu Sayyaf militants attack a South Korean-bound vessel named MV Dongbang Gian and abduct a South Korean skipper and a Filipino crewman off Bongao, Tawi-Tawi.

=== November ===
- 6 November – A German woman tourist was shot to dead while her boyfriend been abducted by Abu Sayyaf militants from their yacht off Tanjong Luuk Pisuk in Sabah.
- 11 November – A Vietnamese vessel MV Royale 16 with 19 sailors on board was attacked by Abu Sayyaf near Basilan, abducting 6 sailors while injuring one and the remaining 13 sailors was released.
- 20 November – Two Indonesian fishermen was kidnapped by five Abu Sayyaf gunmen off Lahad Datu, Sabah, while Philippine military been informed to intercept the bandit.

=== December ===
- 10 December – Malaysian security forces killed an ASG commander in a shootout in Sabah, Malaysia.
- 10 December – Three soldiers were killed and 17 others are wounded in Patikul, Sulu after they clashed with the militants. At least 10 Abu Sayyaf militants were also killed.
