= Andulinang Island =

Island in the Philippines

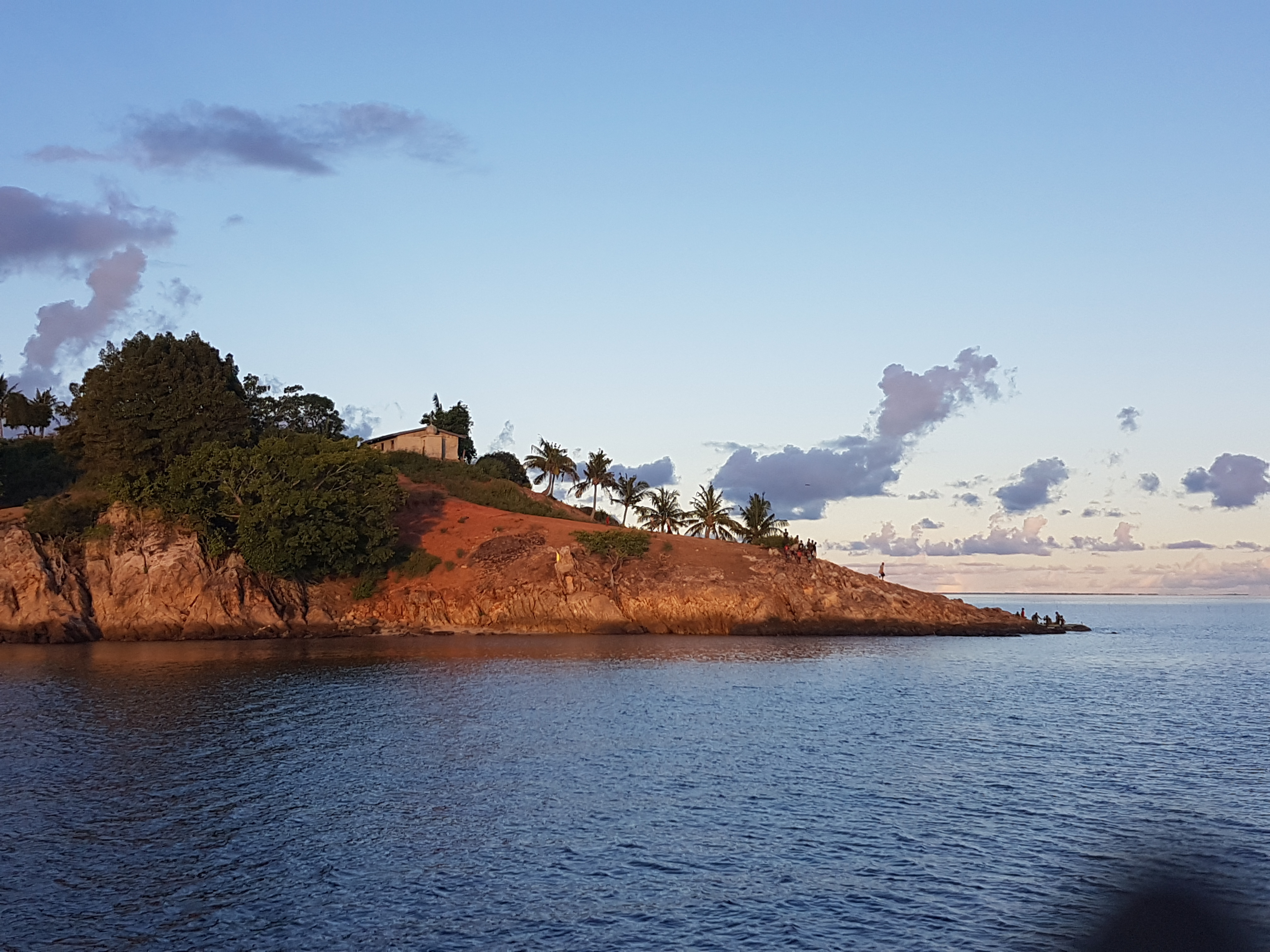
- Andulinang Island

- Location within Philippines

Geography
- Coordinates: 4°46′20″N 119°14′31″E
- Archipelago: Sulu Archipelago
- Adjacent to: Celebes Sea
- Area: 0.02 km^{2} (0.0077 sq mi)

Administration
- Philippines
- Region: Bangsamoro Autonomous Region in Muslim Mindanao
- Province: Tawi-Tawi
- Municipality: Sitangkai

Additional information

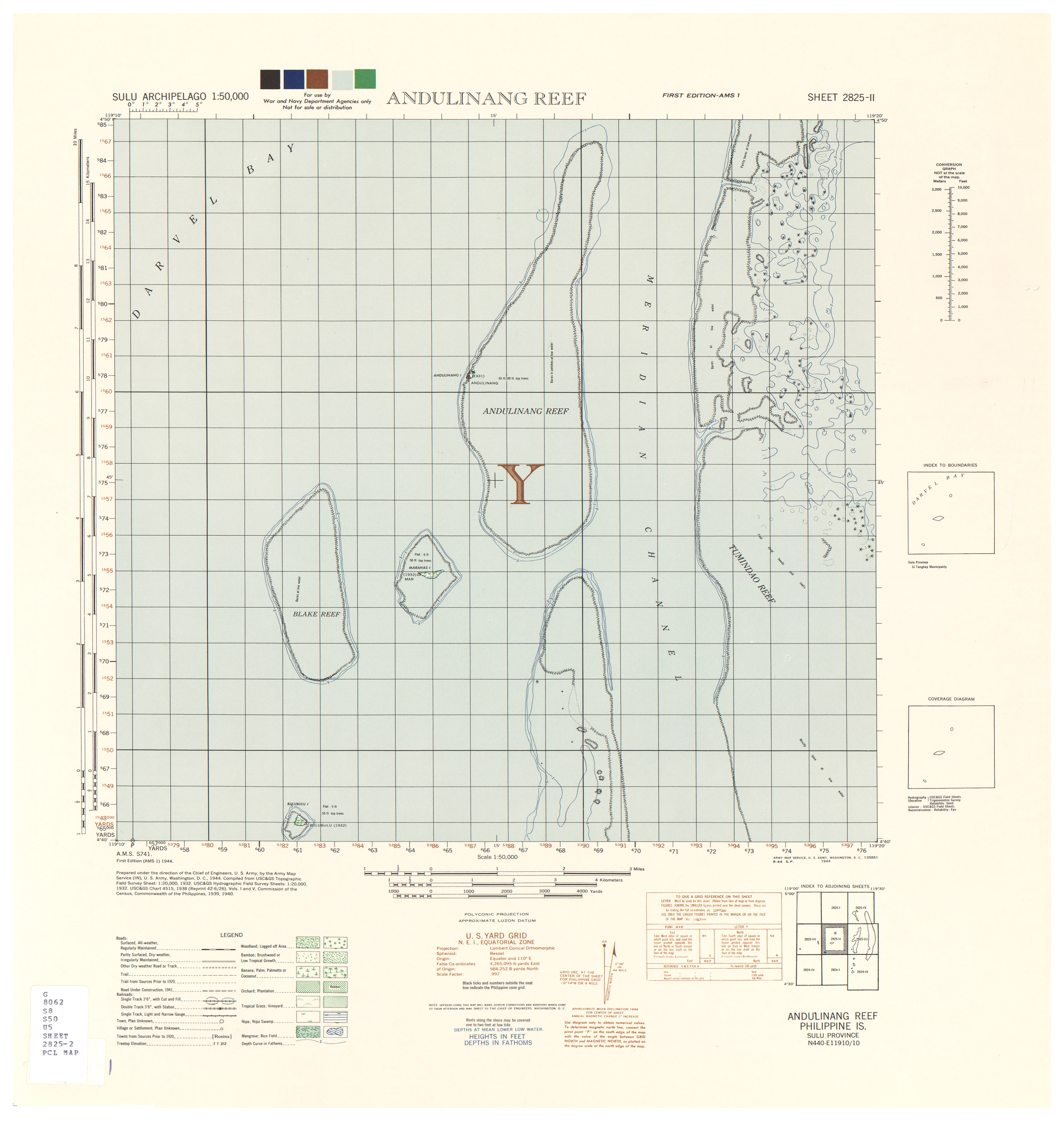
Map of Andulinang Reef

Andulinang Island is an island in the municipality of Sitangkai, Tawi-Tawi. With an area of 0.02 square kilometres (0.0077 sq mi). It is located at the western edge of the Andulinang Reef. It is one of the last islands of the Sulu Archipelago nearest the Philippine-Malaysian border next to Panguan Island and Mardanas Island.

== See also ==
- List of islands of the Philippines
- Panguan Island
- Mardanas Island
- Panampangan Island
