= Panampangan Island =

Island in Tawi-Tawi Province of Mindanao, Philippines

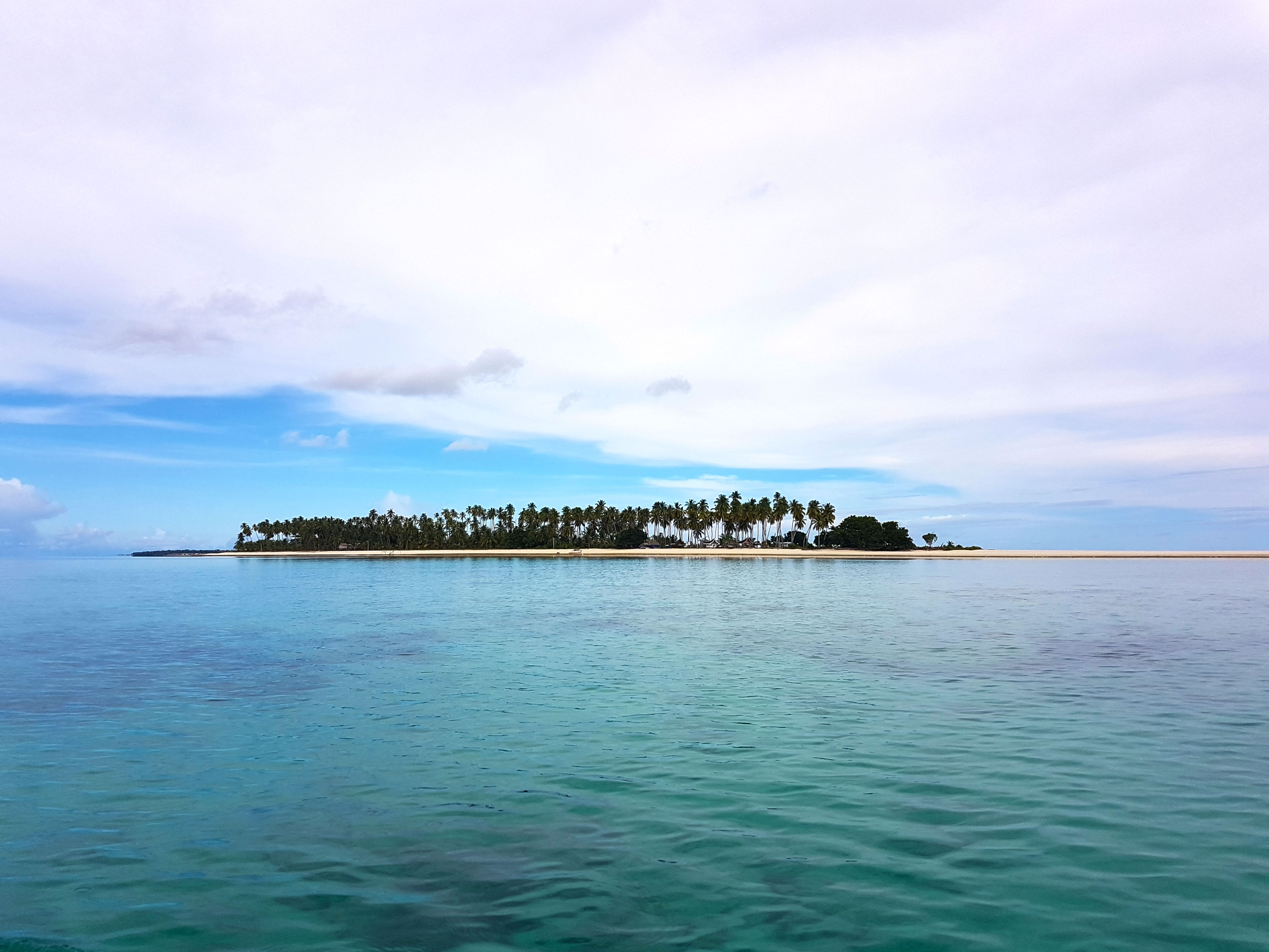
- Panampangan Island

- Location within Philippines

Geography
- Coordinates: 5°3′42″N 120°4′24″E
- Archipelago: Sulu Archipelago
- Adjacent to: Celebes Sea
- Area: 0.1 km^{2} (0.039 sq mi)

Administration
- Philippines
- Region: Bangsamoro Autonomous Region in Muslim Mindanao
- Province: Tawi-Tawi
- Municipality: Sapa-Sapa

Panampangan Island is an island in the municipality of Sapa-Sapa, Tawi-Tawi. With an area of 0.1 square kilometres (0.039 sq mi). It is located inside Basibuli Shoal, to which its sandbar extends to 3,128.37 metres (10,263.7 ft). It is considered as the longest sandbar in the Philippines and is characterized with fine white sand beach in the Sulu Archipelago.

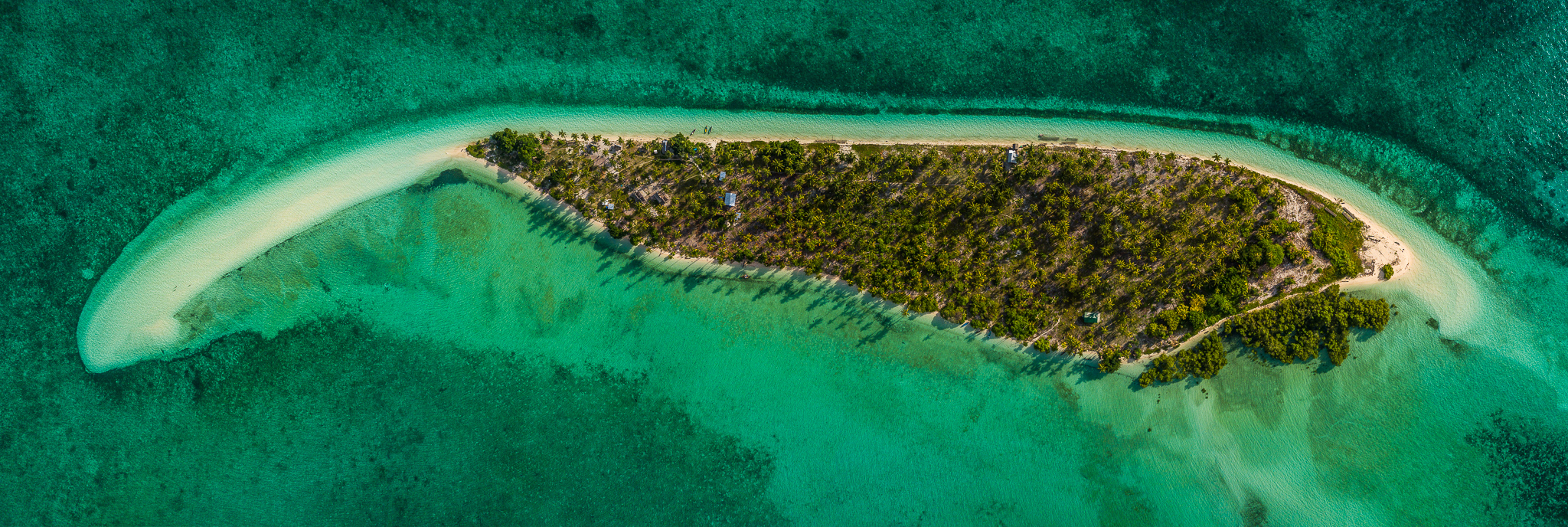
Aerial Map View of Panampangan Island

== See also ==
- List of islands of the Philippines
- Andulinang Island
- Mardanas Island
- Panguan Island
