= Sugbai =

Philippine island

- Location within Philippines

Geography
- Location: Sugbai Passage
- Coordinates: 5°24′N 120°23′E
- Archipelago: Sulu Archipelago
- Adjacent to: Celebes Sea; Sulu Sea
- Length: 4.5 km (2.8 mi)
- Width: 1.3 km (0.81 mi)

Administration
- Philippines
- Region: ARMM
- Province: Tawi-Tawi

Sugbai Island (also spelled Sugbay or Sigboy) is a Philippine island in the Sulu Archipelago between the Sulu Sea and the Celebes Sea. It is in the South Ubian municipality of Tawi-Tawi province. There is a fishing village on its southern shore.

In October 2015, aircraft wreckage was discovered on the island, leading to speculation about it being from a lost flight.
