= Mardanas Island =

Island in Tawi-Tawi, Philippines

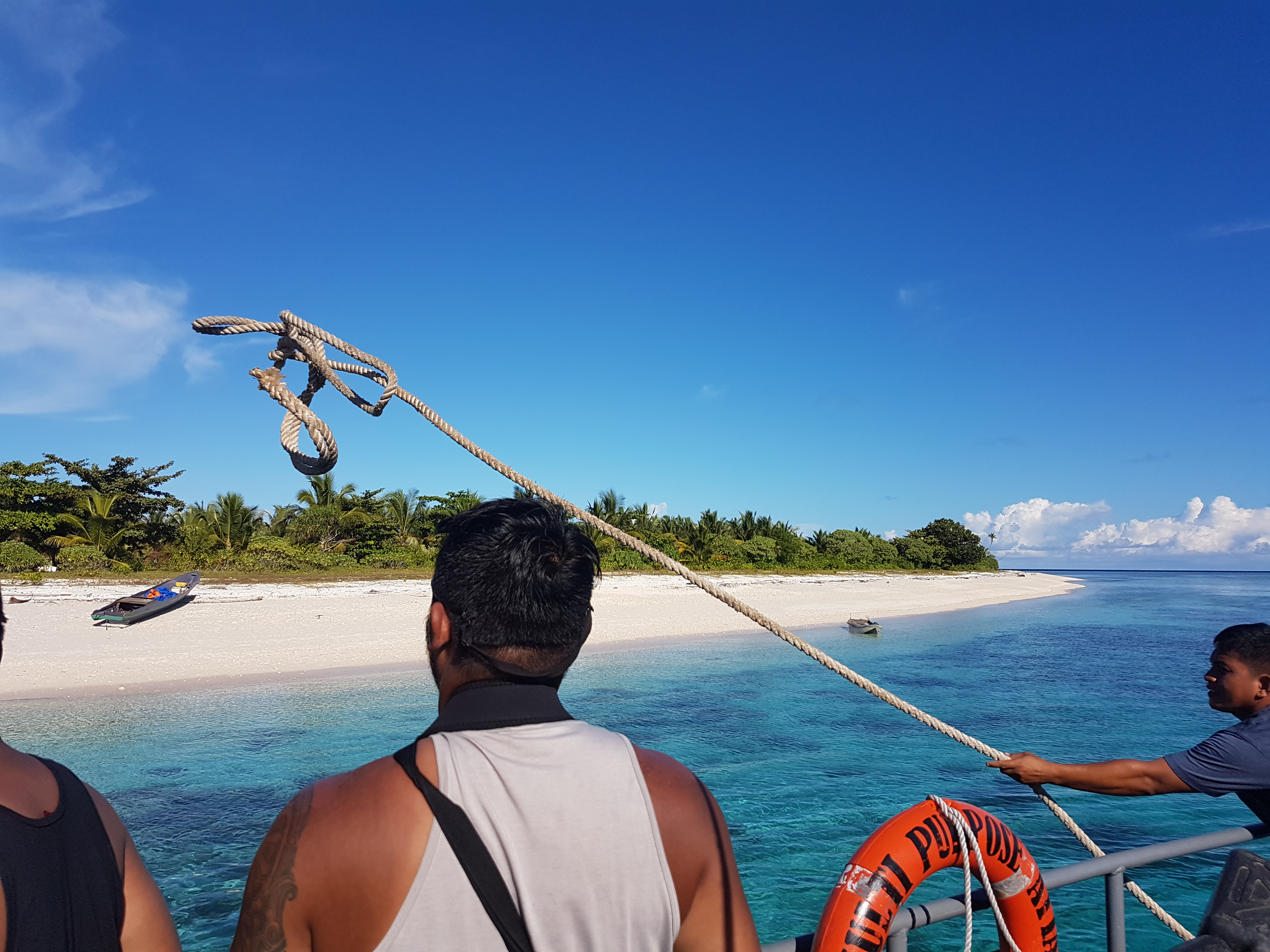
- Mardanas Island

- Location within Philippines

Geography
- Coordinates: 4°43′17″N 119°8′42″E
- Archipelago: Sulu Archipelago
- Adjacent to: Celebes Sea
- Area: 0.1 km^{2} (0.039 sq mi)

Administration
- Philippines
- Region: Bangsamoro Autonomous Region in Muslim Mindanao
- Province: Tawi-Tawi
- Municipality: Sitangkai

Additional information

Mardanas Island is an island in the municipality of Sitangkai, Tawi-Tawi. With an area of 0.1 square kilometres (0.039 sq mi). It is officially known as Siluag in the 1939 Census Atlas of the Philippines; however, locals and the Philippine Navy dispute this name. It is one of the last islands of the Sulu Archipelago nearest the Philippine-Malaysian border and is next to Panguan Island.

== See also ==
- List of islands of the Philippines
- Philippine Navy
- Andulinang Island
- Panguan Island
- Panampangan Island
