= Panguan Island =

Island in Sitangkai, Tawi-Tawi

Native name: Malamanok
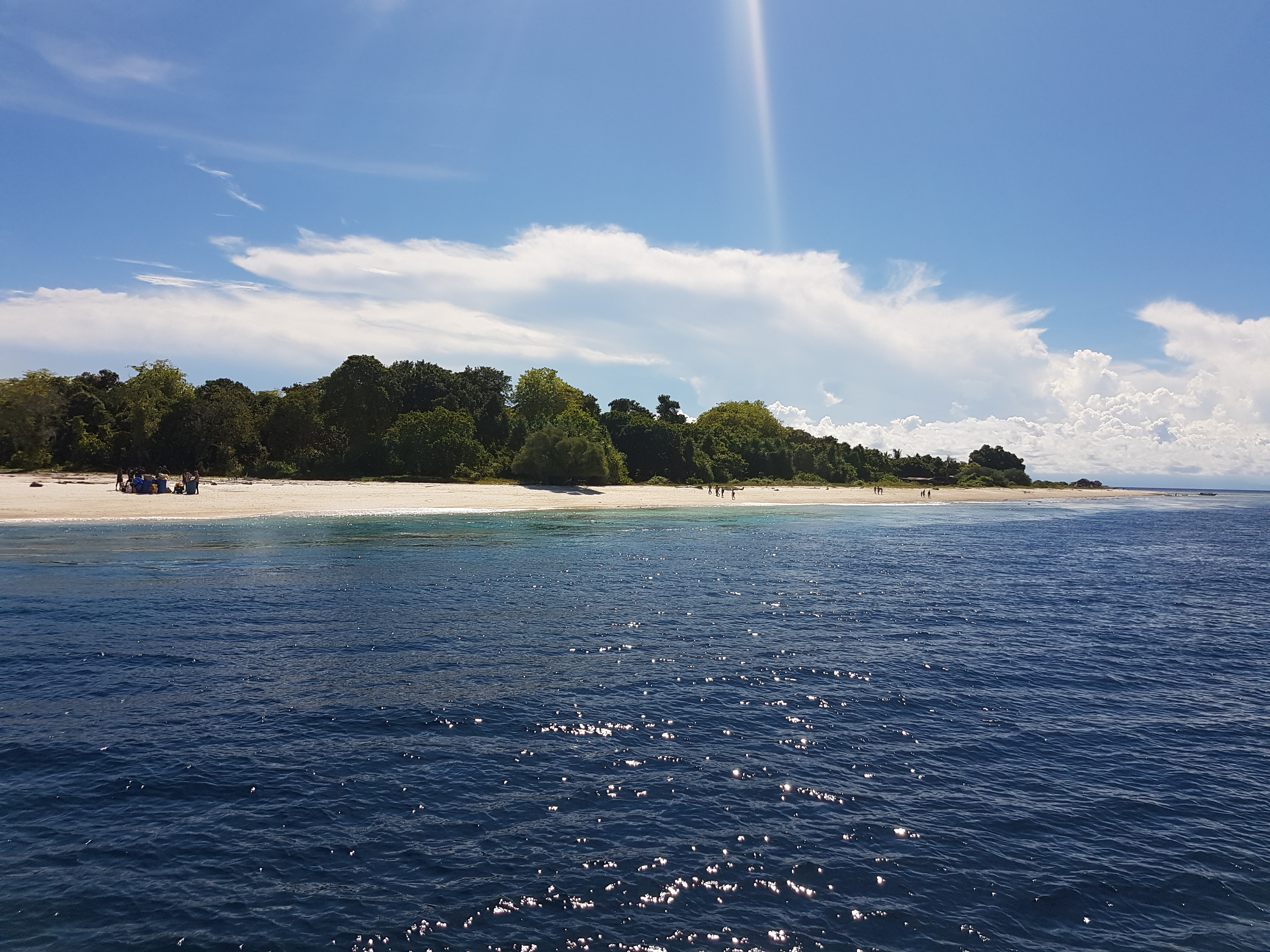
- Panguan Island

- Location within Philippines

Geography
- Coordinates: 4°42′38″N 119°1′53″E
- Archipelago: Sulu Archipelago
- Adjacent to: Celebes Sea
- Area: 0.06 km^{2} (0.023 sq mi)

Administration
- Philippines
- Region: Bangsamoro Autonomous Region in Muslim Mindanao
- Province: Tawi-Tawi
- Municipality: Sitangkai

Demographics
- Population: 252 (2022)
- Ethnic groups: Sama-Bajau

Additional information

Panguan Island (also spelled as Panggungan Island) is an island in the municipality of Sitangkai, Tawi-Tawi. With an area of 0.06 square kilometres (0.023 sq mi). It is also known as Malamanok, coming from the Sama-Bajau dialect which means eat chicken as locals who travel to Sabah usually use this island as a stop-over to eat roasted chicken prior continuing their journey to Malaysia. It is the last island of the Sulu Archipelago nearest to the Philippine-Malaysian border.

This island is 50 km or 31 miles away from Sabah state. Just like other Philippine border communities, the area lacks access to food, potable water and healthcare.

The island has a newly constructed military barrack, a flagpole, and a small community of Badjao (Sama Dilaut). In 2022, the island reportedly has a population of 252.

== History ==
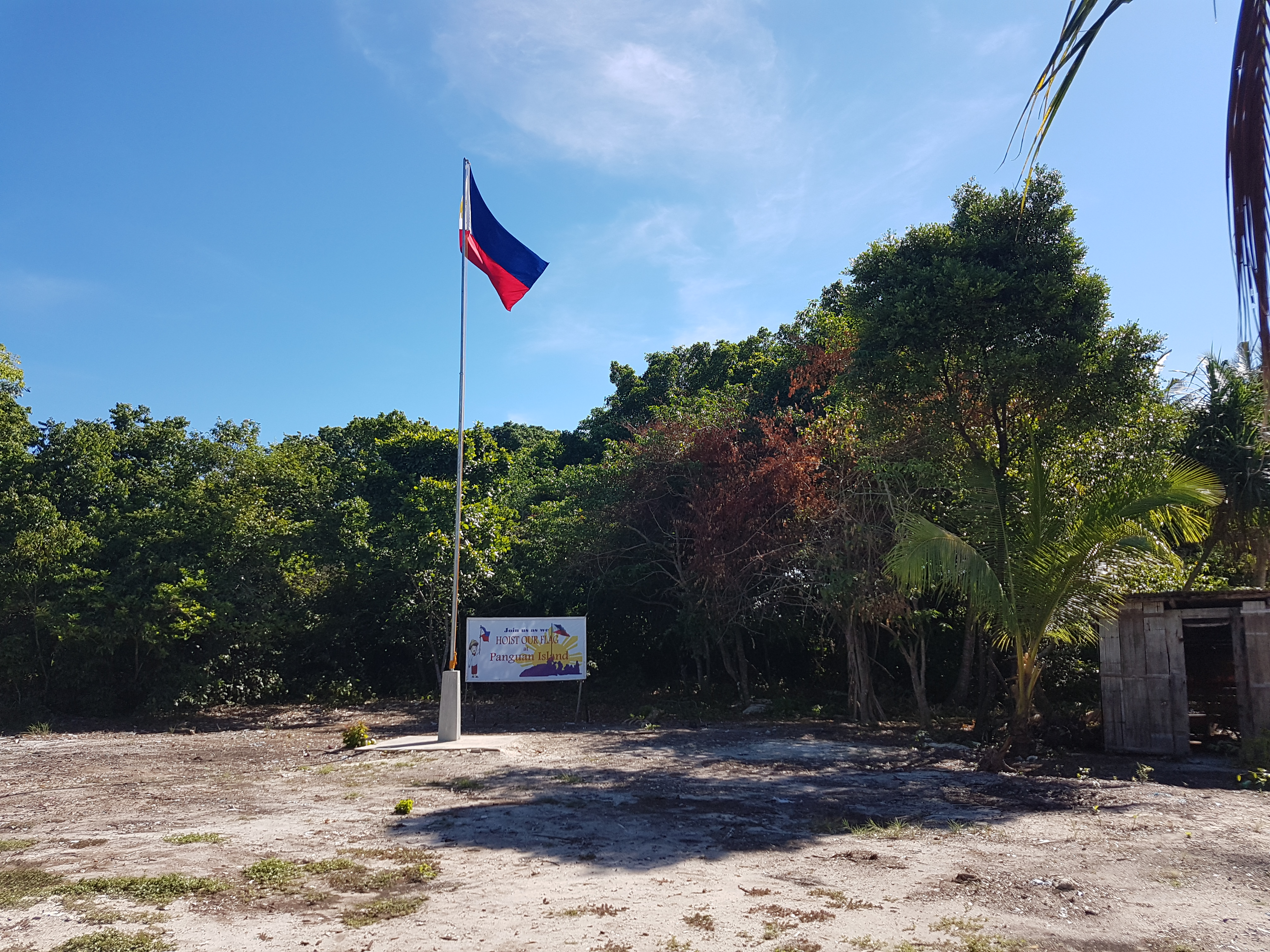
The southernmost flagpole in the Philippines at Panguan Island, Tawi-Tawi. Put up on April 29, 2017 by the 10th Philippine Marines Battalion Landing Team after it was secured from a decade of occupation by the Abu Sayyaf terror group.

Known as the westernmost island of the Tawi-Tawi group, Panguan Island was used as a hideout by the Abu Sayyaf terror group until it was liberated by the 10th Marines Battalion Landing Team (MBLT-10) of the Philippine Marine Corps after the surrender of eleven high-ranking Abu Sayyaf leaders of Tawi-Tawi in April 2017.

The Philippine flag was hoisted on the island on 29 April 2017 to signify its placement under the control of the Philippine government.

== See also ==
- List of islands of the Philippines
- Philippine Marine Corps
- Abu Sayyaf
- Andulinang Island
- Mardanas Island
- Panampangan Island
