= Sulu Archipelago =

Islands in the Philippines

Native name: Kapū'-pūan sin Sūg كَفُوْءْفُوْأَنْ سِنْ سُوْݢْ
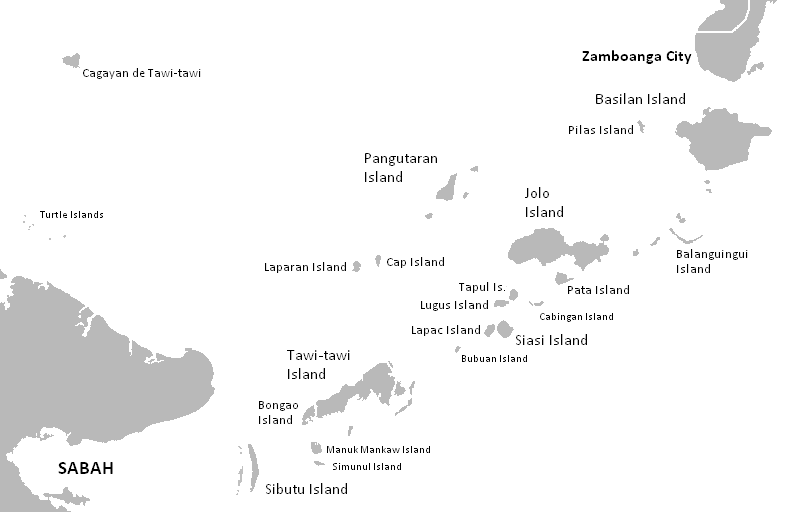

- Location within Philippines

Geography
- Location: Southeast Asia
- Coordinates: 6°N 121°E
- Archipelago: Philippines
- Adjacent to: Celebes Sea; Sulu Sea
- Major islands: Basilan; Jolo; Tawi-Tawi
- Area: 4,068 km^{2} (1,571 sq mi)

Administration
- Philippines
- Region: Bangsamoro; Zamboanga Peninsula
- Provinces: Basilan; Sulu; Tawi-Tawi
- Largest settlement: Jolo

Demographics
- Population: 1,996,970 (2020)
- Pop. density: 313/km^{2} (811/sq mi)
- Ethnic groups: Banguingui; Samal; Tausug; Yakan; Bajau; Zamboangueño Chavacano; Cebuano

The Sulu Archipelago (Tausug: Kapū'-pūan sin Sūg; Sulat Sūg: كَفُوْءْفُوْأَنْ سِنْ سُوْݢْ; Filipino: Kapuluan ng Sulu) is a chain of islands in the Pacific Ocean in the southwestern Philippines. The archipelago forms the northern limit of the Celebes Sea and southern limit of the Sulu Sea.

The Sulu Archipelago islands are within the Mindanao island group, consisting of the Philippines provinces of Basilan, Sulu, and Tawi-Tawi; hence, the archipelago is sometimes referred to as Basulta, derived from the first syllables of the three provinces.

The archipelago is not, as is often supposed, the remains of a land bridge between Borneo and the Philippines. Rather, it is the exposed edge of small submarine ridges produced by tectonic tilting of the sea bottom. Basilan, Jolo, Tawi-Tawi and other islands in the group are extinct volcanic cones rising from the southernmost ridge. Tawi-Tawi, the southernmost island of the group, has a serpentine basement-complex core with a limestone covering. This island chain is an important migration route for birds.

The largest municipalities in the area are on the island of Jolo. The larger island of Palawan to its north, the coastal regions of the westward-extending Zamboanga Peninsula of Mindanao, and the north-eastern part of the island of Borneo were formerly parts of the thalassocratic Sultanate of Sulu.

The archipelago is the home of the indigenous Tausūg people and various groups of Sama(l) peoples, including the semi-nomadic Bajau; the land-based Sama; the related Yakan people; and the Jama Mapun people. The Tausug language is widely spoken in the Sulu Archipelago as both a first and a second language across these islands. Sama-Bajaw languages are also spoken. The Yakan language is spoken mainly in Basilan Island. Numerous dialects of Sinama are spoken throughout the archipelago, from the Tawi-Tawi Island group, to the Mapun island group, to the coast of Mindanao and beyond.

== Geography ==
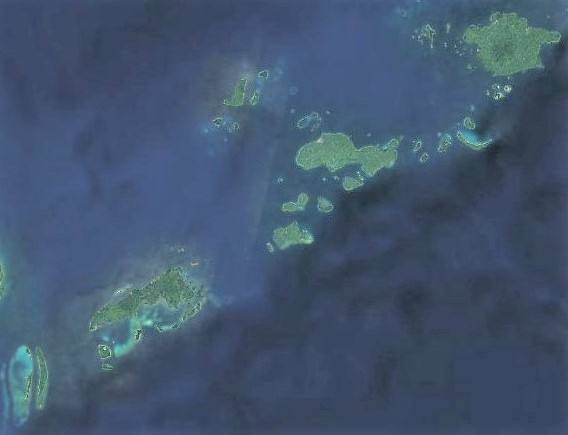
Sulu archipelago satellite image captured by Sentinel-2 in 2016

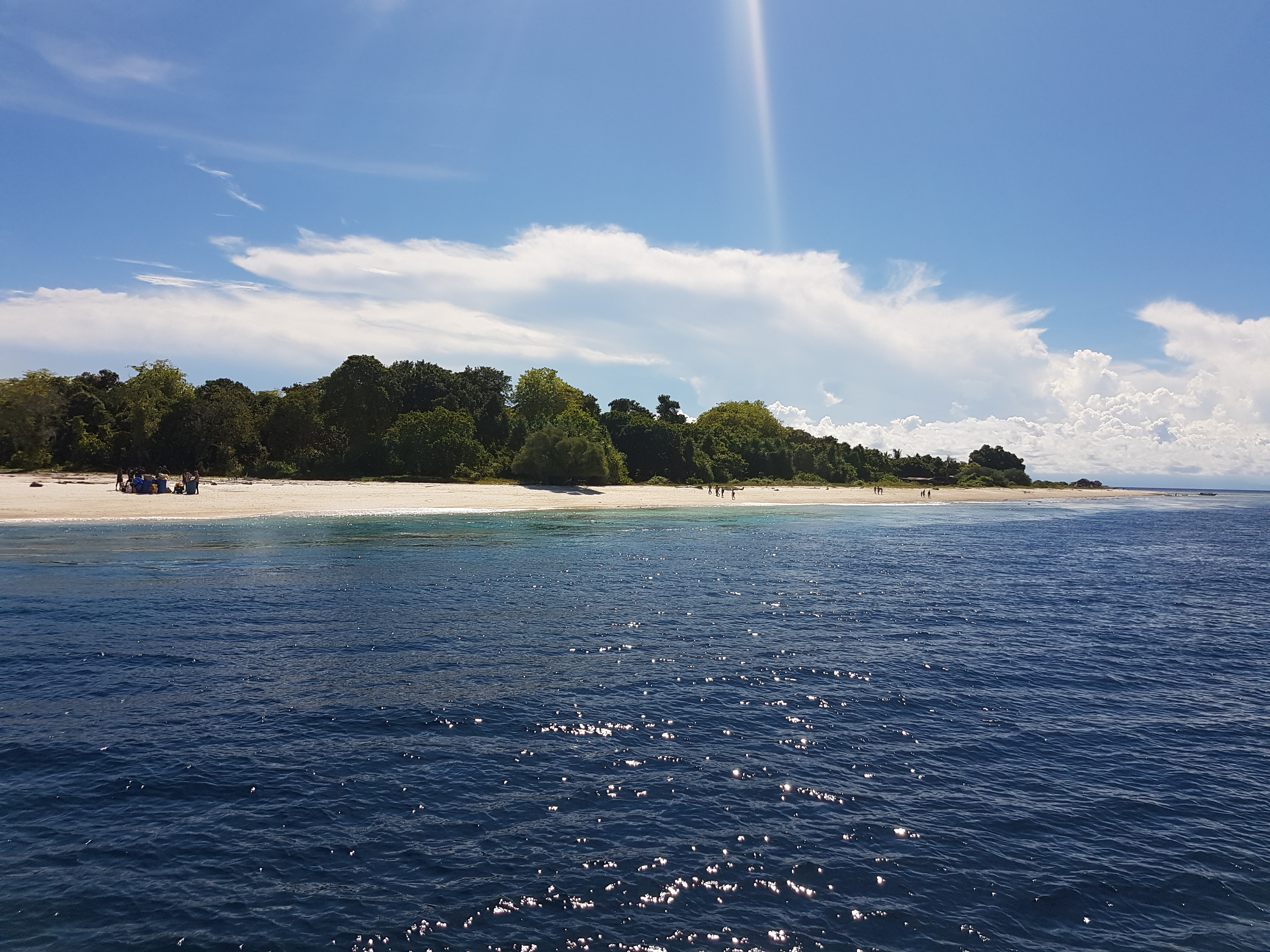
Panguan Island, the last island of the Sulu Archipelago before the Philippines-Malaysia Border.

The archipelago is geographically subdivided into several groups, most significantly those around the main islands of Basilan, Jolo, and Tawi-Tawi. There are, however, other groups containing mostly small islands; not all of these are inhabited:

=== Basilan group ===
- Basilan
- Pilas
  - Bongo
  - Bubuan
  - Santa Cruz Islands
  - Lanawan
  - Sumisip
  - Tambuilan
  - Tamuk Island
  - Timbungan
  - many other small islands

=== Jolo group ===
- Capual
- Jolo island
- Pata
- Tongquil
  - Balanguingui
  - Bangalao
  - Bitinan
  - Bucutua
  - Bulan
  - Cabucan
  - Gujangan
  - Hegad
  - Mamanoc
  - Manangut
  - Minis
  - Pangasinan
  - Pantocunan
  - Parol
  - Patian
  - Simisa
  - Tatalan
  - other small islands

=== Keenapusan group ===
  - Bubuan
  - Bintawlan
  - Nusa
  - South Ubian
  - Tabawan
  - Tagao
  - other small islands

=== Laparan group ===
- Deatoboato
- Cap Island
- Laparan
- Dog Can
- Pearl Bank (atoll)

=== Pangutaran group ===
- Kulasssein
- Panducan
- Pangutaran
  - Basbas
  - Cunilan
  - Datubato
  - North Ubian
  - Tubigan
  - Usada
  - other small islands

=== Sibutu group ===
- Andulinang
- Mardanas
- Omapoy
- Panguan
- Sibutu
- Sitangkai

=== Tapul group ===
- Lapac
- Lugus (Bulipongpong)
- Siasi
- Tapul
  - Kabingaan
  - Laminusa
  - Paquia
  - Taluc
  - Tara
  - Tapaan
  - other small islands

=== Tawi-Tawi group ===
- Bongao
- Manuk Mankaw
- Simunul
- Sanga-Sanga
- Tawitawi
- Topaan
  - Banaran
  - Baturapac
  - Bilatan
  - Calupag
  - Kang Tipayan Dakula
  - Kang Tipayan Diki Island
  - Languyan
  - Latuan (Sunsang), Lubucan
  - Mantabuan
  - Naungan
  - Parangan
  - Pasegan Guimba
  - Sikubong
  - Simalak
  - Sugbai
  - Tandubas
  - Tandubato
  - Taruk
  - Tingungun
  - Tubig Dakula (Bohe Mahiya), Tumbagaan
  - other small islands

=== Others/Outliers ===
- Mapun (formerly Cagayan de Tawi-Tawi/Cagayan de Sulu)
- Turtle Islands
  - (Baguan
  - Boaan
  - Great Bakkungaan
  - Langaan
  - Lihiman
  - Sibaung
  - Taganak)
  - Bubuan
  - Cacatan
  - Dammai
  - Datubato
  - Lahatlahat
  - Maniacolat
  - Singaan
  - Sulade
  - Teomabal
  - other mostly uninhabited small islands

== History ==
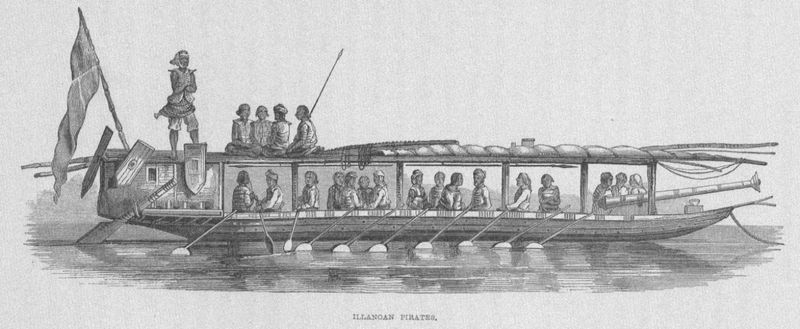
The pirate ships used by the Moro pirates were known as proa.

The Sulu Archipelago was once part of Majapahit and is mentioned in the Old Javanese eulogy of Nagarakretagama as Solot. Afterwards, it became part of the Bruneian Sultanate (1368–1888), but gained its independence in 1578. Many Tausugs and other native Muslims of Sulu Archipelago already interacted with Kapampangan and Tagalog Muslims called Luzones based in Brunei, and there were intermarriages between them.

The region then became part of the independent Sultanate of Sulu, founded in 1405. The arrival of Western powers later became a source of conflict when the Spanish began to impose rule over the Spanish East Indies. Spanish military expeditions against the sultanate were launched over the centuries of the Spanish colonial period in the Philippines. The Moro Rebellion (1899–1913) was an independence movement that continued the Moro conflict against the colonial forces of the United States in Moro regions of the archipelago and southwestern Philippines.

=== 1405–1844: Sulu Sultanate and Spanish East Indies ===
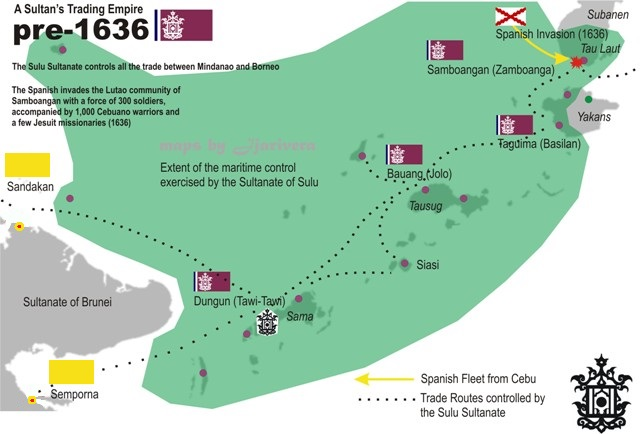
Pre-1636 Sultanate of Sulu trade range.

The Sulu Archipelago was part of the Islamic Sultanate of Sulu, founded in 1405 by Shari’ful Hashem Syed Abu Bak’r. The sultanate also included portions of Borneo, Mindanao, Palawan, and other islands in the region.

From the first Spanish encounters with Jolo island, the Spanish–Moro conflict met firm and organised resistance from the Sultanate of Sulu. Miguel López de Legazpi had established a colony in Cebu in May 1565. The initial focus of the Spanish conquest to establish the Spanish East Indies was northwards. In June 1578, Francisco de Sande, Governor-General of the Spanish East Indies, dispatched Captain Esteban Rodríguez de Figueroa and the Jesuit priest Juan del Campo and the coadjutor Gaspar Gómez to Jolo, resulting in a negotiated compromise where the Sulu sultan paid a regular tribute in pearls. The following year, Figueroa was awarded the sole right to colonise Mindanao. In 1587, during a campaign against Borneo launched by Sande, Figueroa attacked and burned down Jolo. The Spaniards left Jolo after a few days.

The Joloanos resolved to resist Spanish intrusions. In response to attacks, Joloanos raided Spanish settlements and reducciones. In 1593, the first permanent Roman Catholic mission was established on the Zamboanga Peninsula, and three years later, the Spanish Army launched another attack on Jolo, which was repelled by the army of Rajah Bongsu. In November 1593, the Spanish Empire sent Juan Ronquillo to Tampakan to thwart the slave raiders. The following year, the Spanish Army troops relocated to Caldera Bay (Recodo), Mindanao. In 1598, another expedition was launched against Jolo, but was repelled by the Joloanos. In the late 1600s, Captain Juan Gallinato, with a group of about 200 Spanish soldiers, attacked Jolo but was unsuccessful. By 1601, after three months of heavy fighting, the Spanish troops retreated. In 1628, a larger raiding force of about 200 Spanish army officers and 1,600 soldiers was organised to attack Jolo to defeat Muslim slave raiders and traders, but the Spanish again failed to take Jolo. A large Spanish force of 2500 soldiers attacked Jolo again on 17 March 1630, to no avail. When its commander, Lorenzo de Olazo, was wounded, the Spaniards retreated.

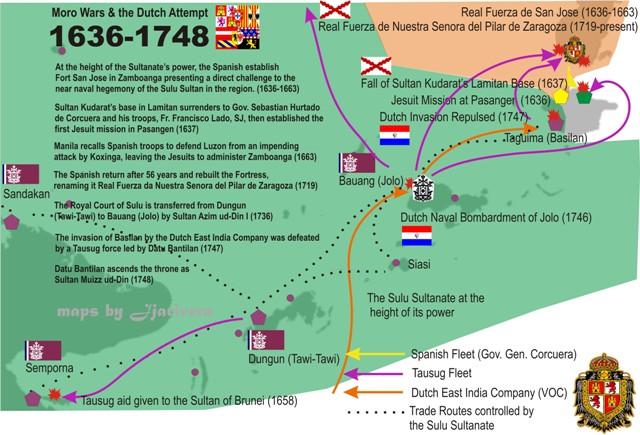
The Sultanate of Sulu range in 1636 with the arrival of Spain.

On 4 January 1638, Governor Sebastián Hurtado de Corcuera led a naval and military expedition of about 80 ships and 2,000 troops to attack Jolo, but Sultan Wasit put up stiff resistance. However, Sultan Wasit's kuta army suffered a serious epidemic, and he and his chieftains sought refuge in the Dungun area of Tawi-Tawi. The Spanish Army easily occupied Jolo, and a small garrison was left there to control the area. The garrison was withered away by frequent raids launched by Sultan Wasit, and by 1645, this garrison had been wasted away. This was the first time that Jolo had been occupied by the Spaniards for an appreciable length of time. From 1663 to 1718, an interregnum of peace occurred because the Spanish troops were ordered to abandon the Zamboanga Peninsula, and forts south of that—and regroup in Manila to prepare for the impending attack of Koxinga—which never happened.

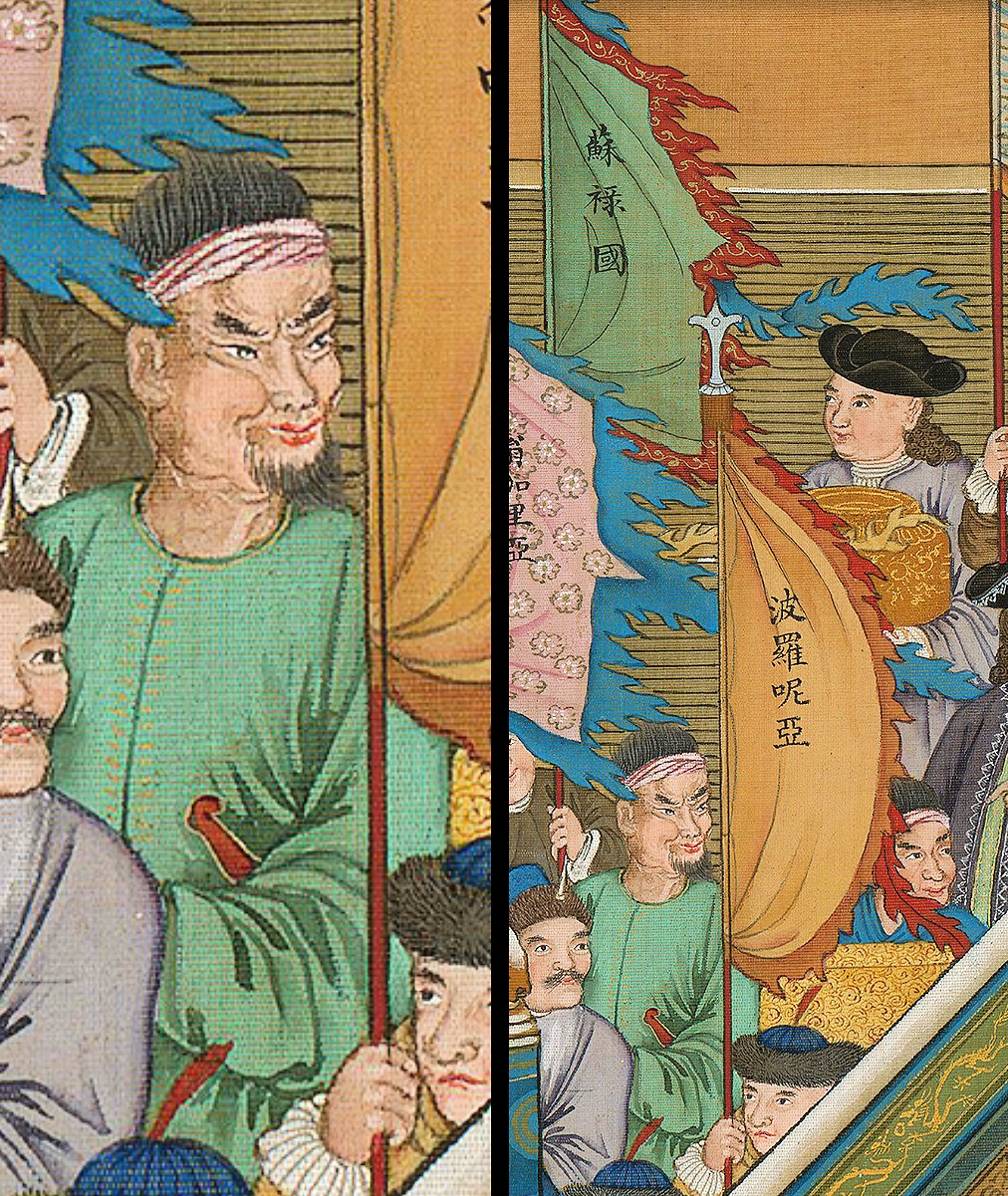
Sulu Archipelago (苏禄国) delegates in Beijing, China, in 1761. 万国来朝图

Hostilities resumed in the 18th century, triggered by the 1718 decision by Governor General Juan Antonio de la Torre Bustamante to reconstruct the Fort Real Fuerza de San José in Bagumbayan, Zamboanga. The fort was completed in 1719, renamed Real Fuerza del Pilar de Zaragosa, and inaugurated on 16 April; it is now known as Fort Pilar. Three years later, in 1722, the Spaniards launched another expedition against Jolo, led by Andrés García; it failed. In 1731, General Ignacio Iriberri led a force of 1000 to Jolo and captured it after a lengthy siege, but the Spaniards again left after a few days. In 1755, a force of 1,900 Spanish soldiers, led by captains Simeón Valdez and Pedro Gastambide, was sent to Jolo in retaliation for raids by Sultan Muiz ud-Din, but the Spaniards were defeated. In 1775, after a Moro raid on Zamboanga, Captain Vargas led a punitive expedition against Jolo, but his force was repulsed.

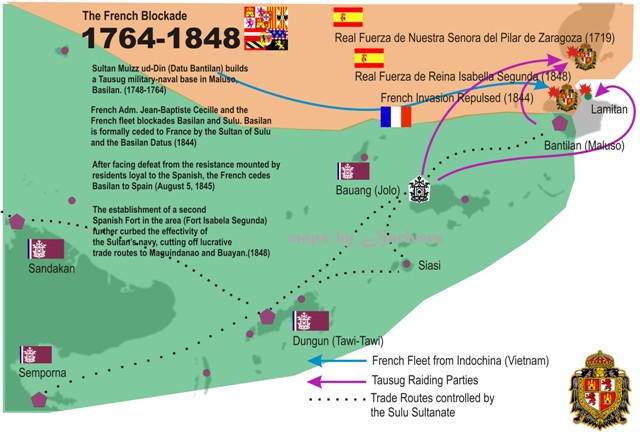
The Sulu areas in 1764 with the arrival of France.

In the second half of the 18th century, Great Britain became a new player in the archipelago After occupying Manila from 1762 to 1764, during the Seven Years' War between Spain, Great Britain and other European powers, the British Army withdrew to the south and established trading alliances between the Sulu Sultanate and the British East India Company. During that time, Sulu Sultanate surrendered Basilan to Spain in 1762. Spanish attacks on Jolo were now directed at weakening British trading interests in the south. In 1784, Aguilar conducted a series of unsuccessful assaults against Jolo and in 1796, Spanish admiral José Alava was sent from Madrid with a powerful naval fleet to stop the slave-raiding attacks from the Sulu Sea. The British presence was signalled when in 1798, the British Royal Navy, which had established a base in Sulu, bombarded Fort Pilar in Zamboanga. In 1803, Lord Richard Wellesley, the Governor-General of India, ordered Robert J. Farquhar to transfer trading and military operations to Balambangan island near Borneo; the resulting outpost lasted only until 1806. By 1895, the Great Britain had withdrawn its army and navy from the Sulu Sea.

In 1815, the galleon trade across the Pacific Ocean between the Philippines and Mexico ended, since Mexico had declared its independence in 1810, and an extended war of independence was in progress. Most of the other Spanish-ruled areas of the Americas had also rebelled against their colonial masters. In 1821, the Philippine Islands were administered directly from Madrid, rather than via the Viceroy of Mexico, since Mexico and its southern neighbours had won their independence from Spain. The Spanish Empire sought to end the "Moro threat". In 1824, the Marina Sutil, a light and manoeuvrable naval force under Capitan Alonso Morgado was sent to confront the slave raiders in the Sulu Sea.

=== 1844–1898: Spanish occupation ===
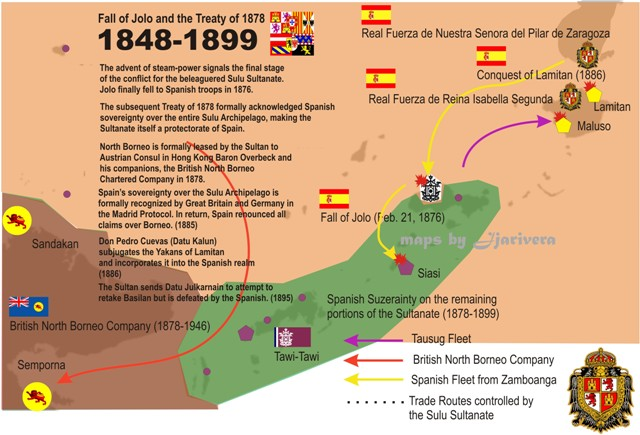
The Sulu Archipelago during the Spanish occupation.

In 1844, Governor General Narciso Claveria led yet another expedition against Jolo and in 1848, Claveria, with powerful gunboats Magallanes, El Cano, and Reina de Castilla, which he had brought from Europe, supervised the attack on the Balangingi stronghold in Tungkil. The raid resulted in the capture of many Sama Balangingi, who were exiled to the tobacco fields of the Cagayan Valley. The leader of the Sama, Paglima Taupan, was not captured. With the fall of the Balangingi, a powerful ally of the Sulu Sultanate, the sultanate's maritime power began to decline. In 1850, Governor General Juan Urbiztondo continued with Claveria's campaign and annihilated the remaining Balangingi strongholds at Tungkil. A raid on Jolo that year was a failure. On 28 February 1851, Urbiztondo launched another campaign against Jolo, razed the whole town and confiscated 112 pieces of artillery. The Spanish troops later withdrew. Also, in 1851, a peace treaty was signed between the Sulu Sultanate and the Spanish, though the terms were understood differently by each party.

In 1876, the Spanish launched a campaign to occupy Jolo. Spurred by their need to curb slave raiding and concerned about other European colonial efforts in the region, the Spanish made a final bid to consolidate their rule in their southern frontier. The British had established trading centres in Jolo by the 19th century, and the French were offering to purchase Basilan Island from the Spanish government. On 21 February 1876, the Spaniards assembled the largest contingent against Jolo, consisting of 9,000 soldiers in 11 transports, 11 gunboats, and 11 steamboats. Headed by Admiral Jose Malcampo, they captured Jolo and established a Spanish settlement.

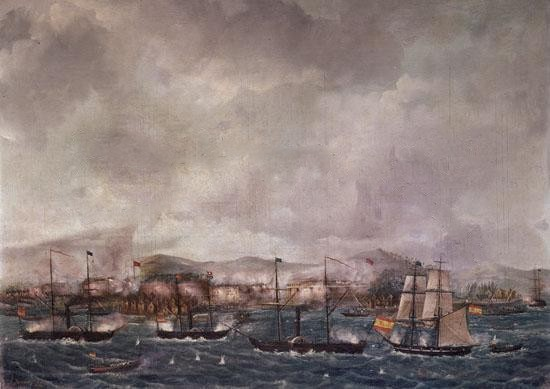
Spanish warships bombarding the Moro pirates of Balanguingui in 1848.

Captain Pascual Cervera was appointed to set up a garrison and serve as military governor; he served from March 1876 to December 1876 followed by Jose Paulin (December 1876 – April 1877), Carlos Martinez (Sept 1877 – Feb 1880), Rafael de Rivera (1880–81), Isidro G. Soto (1881–82), Eduardo Bremon, (1882), Julian Parrado (1882–84), Francisco Castilla (1884–86), Juan Arolas (1886–93), Caesar Mattos (1893), Venancio Hernandez (1893–96), and Luis Huerta (1896–99).

The Spaniards were never secured in Jolo, and by 1878 they had fortified the town with a perimeter wall and tower gates, built inner forts called Puerta Blockaus, Puerta España, and Puerta Alfonso XII, and two outer fortifications named Princesa de Asturias and Torre de la Reina when Sultanate of Sulu formally recognised Spanish sovereignty on Sulu and Tawi-tawi in middle of 19th century, but these areas remained partially ruled by the Spanish as their sovereignty was limited to military stations and garrisons and pockets of civilian settlements. Troops, including a cavalry unit with its own lieutenant commander, were garrisoned within the protective walls. In 1880, Colonel Rafael Gonzales de Rivera, who was appointed by the Governor General, dispatched the 6th Regiment to Siasi and Bongao Islands.

The Spaniards' stronghold was sporadically attacked. On 22 July 1883, it was reported that three unnamed men had succeeded in penetrating Jolo's town plaza and killed three Spaniards. The word “Ajuramentado” was coined by the Spanish colonel Juan Arolas after witnessing several such raids while serving with the Jolo garrison.

=== 1898–1946: American occupation ===
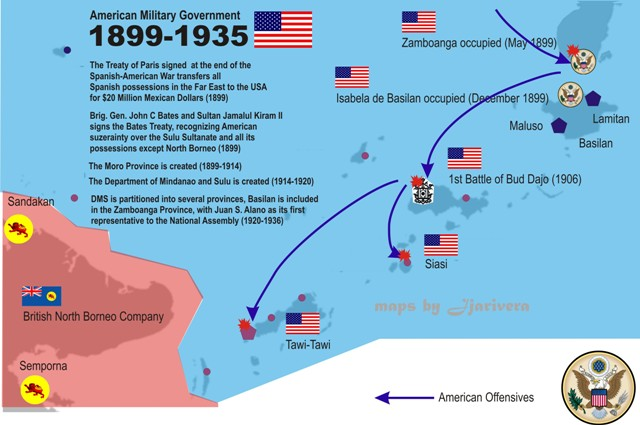
The American occupation steps over the Sulu Archipelago in 1899.

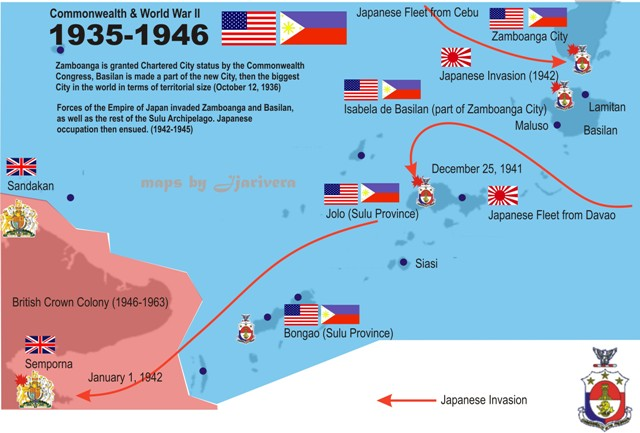
The situation until the end of World War II.

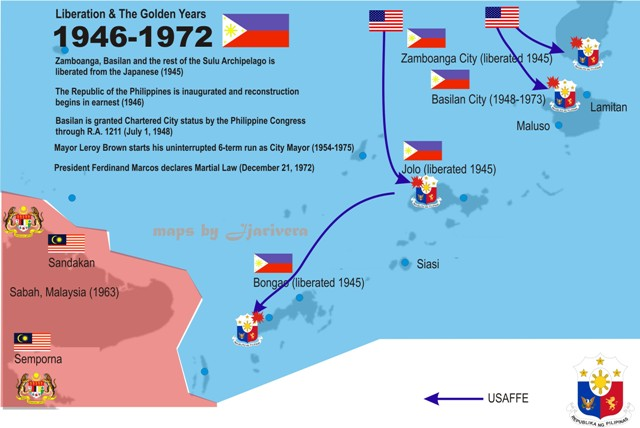
The situation until the independence of the Philippines.

In 1898, the war between Spain and America broke out. Commodore George Dewey of the US Navy defeated the Spanish fleet in the Battle of Manila Bay, following which the American army occupied Manila. The United States took possession of the Philippines under international law after the 1898 Treaty of Paris ended the war.

The Philippine–American War followed in 1898 for three months, during which the American military fought and defeated the Philippine forces under Emilio Aguinaldo for control of the Philippines.

After the Philippine–American War, the Moro Rebellion (1899–1913) independence movement continued the Spanish–Moro conflict, now against the United States occupation of the Philippines. The Sulu Archipelago was considered part of Islamic Moroland by the movement.

==== World War II ====
In December 1941, Japan attacked the United States in the Philippines and Pearl Harbor and the United States declared war on Japan as part of World War II. Japan seized the country in the Philippines campaign (1941–1942). In 1944, the Allies' Philippines Campaign (1944–45) began with the Battle of Leyte Gulf. Allied forces eventually drove the Japanese from the islands.

=== 1946–present: Philippine Independence ===
On 4 July 1946, the Philippines became an independent nation. The fortifications of Jolo remained in good condition during the American occupation, when its walls, gates, and the buildings within it were photographed. Early 20th-century photographs of Jolo show a well-ordered town, neatly laid out in a grid of streets and blocks—characteristics of Spanish urbanism applied with a military rigidity. In the postwar years, the walls degraded.

Jolo suffered major destruction due to bombardment and fire during the military operations against the Moro Islamic independence forces in Jolo in 1973. As of 2013, short stretches of degraded perimeter wall still exist, but are covered by buildings or are partially demolished to less than 1 metre (3.3 ft) in height.

==== Autonomy ====
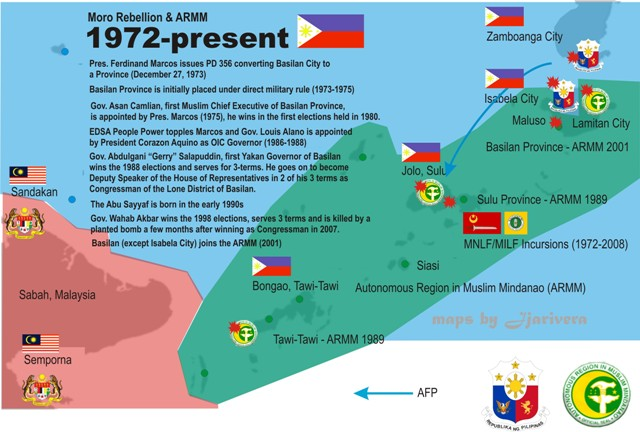
The Autonomous Region in Muslim Mindanao (ARMM) areas in green.

The archipelago was part of the Autonomous Region in Muslim Mindanao from 2006 until its abolition in 2008.

Bangsamoro, officially known as the Autonomous Government of Bangsamoro (Filipino: Nagsasariling Pamahalan ng Bangsamoro), is a proposed autonomous political entity within the Philippines. The proposal is part of the Framework Agreement on the Bangsamoro, a preliminary peace agreement signed between the Moro Islamic Liberation Front and the Philippine government.

== Demographics ==
Population of the Sulu Archipelago

Year	Pop.	±%
1903	95,069	—
1918	195,865	+106.0%
1939	304,678	+55.6%
1948	351,123	+15.2%
1960	482,610	+37.4%
1970	569,446	+18.0%
1975	554,515	−2.6%

Year	Pop.	±%
1980	756,646	+36.5%
1990	936,483	+23.8%
1995	1,082,484	+15.6%
2000	1,274,813	+17.8%
2007	1,796,521	+40.9%
2010	1,476,019	−17.8%
2015	1,674,813	+13.5%

Source: Philippine Statistics Authority

== See also ==
- Sulu Archipelago rain forests
- Banguingui
- Operation Enduring Freedom - Philippines
