= Sitangkai =

Municipality in Tawi-Tawi, Philippines

Sitangkai سيتڠكاي
- Municipality
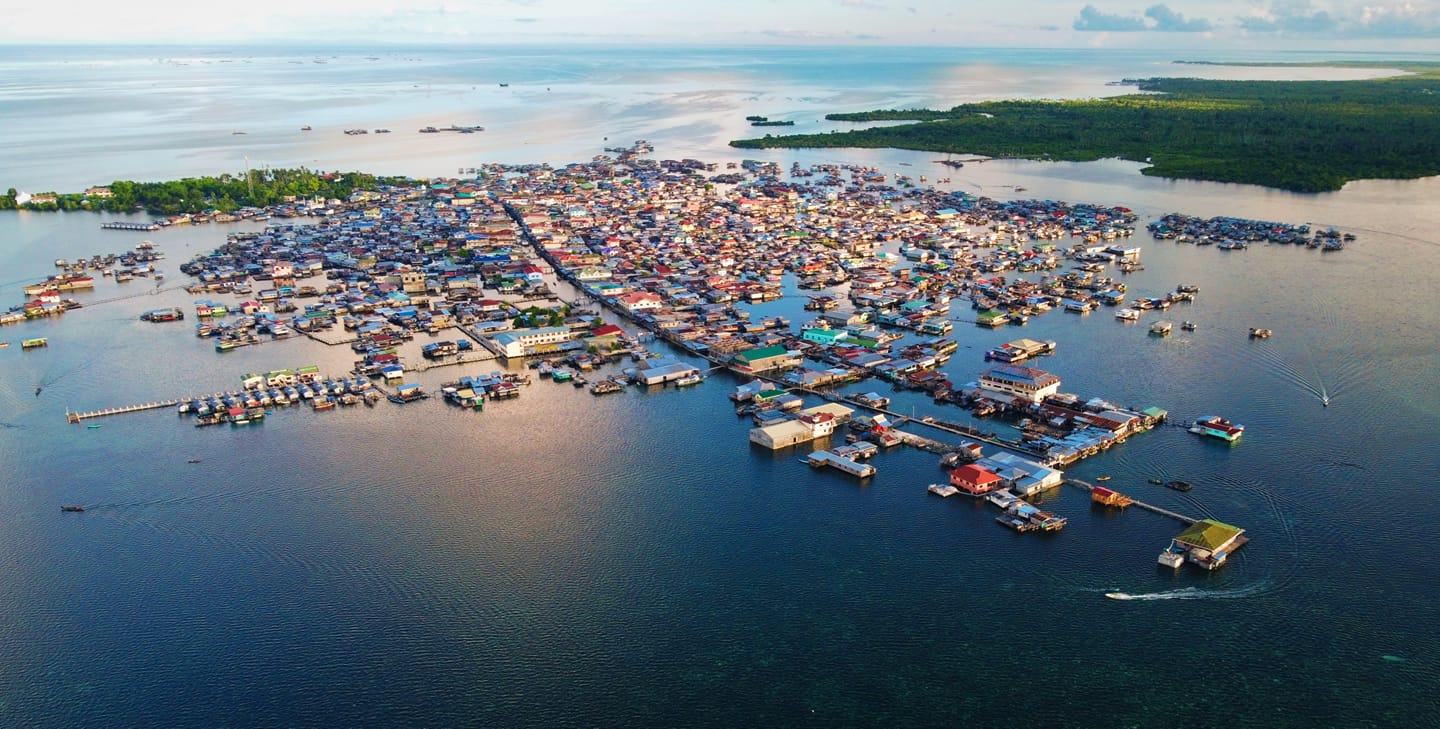
- Core district of Sitangkai

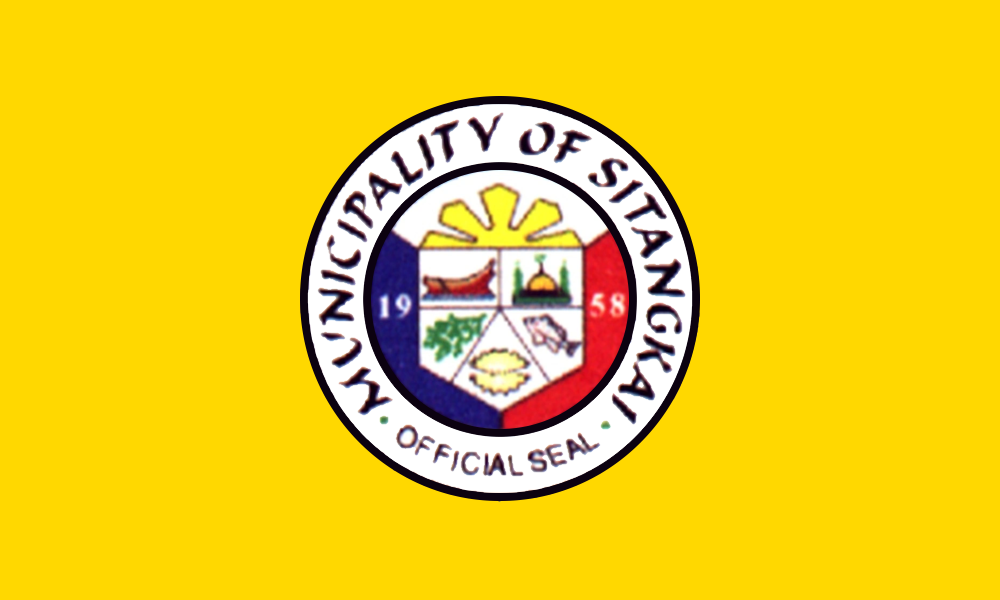
- Flag
- Nicknames: Venice of the South
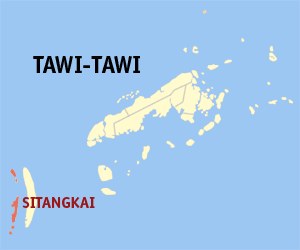
- Map of Tawi-Tawi with Sitangkai highlighted
- Interactive map of Sitangkai
- Location within the Philippines
- Coordinates: 4°39′42″N 119°23′31″E
- Country: Philippines
- Region: Bangsamoro Autonomous Region in Muslim Mindanao
- Province: Tawi-Tawi
- House district: Lone district
- Parliamentary district: 4th district
- Foundation as a municipality: July 1, 1958
- Barangays: 9 (see Barangays)

Government
  - Type: Sangguniang Bayan
  - Mayor: Tiblan C. Ahaja
  - Vice Mayor: Serbin C. Ahaja
  - House Representative: Dimszar M. Sali
  - Municipal Council: Members: Allan K. Ahaja; Myca Shara B. Nawang; Joeben C. Attang; Abdel Yamani K. Ahaja; Bryan S. Hapas; Jadzlee B. Pianah; Merilyn A. Joe; Aldimar A. Awadi
  - Electorate: 27,418 voters (2025)

Area
  - Total: 792.00 km^{2} (305.79 sq mi)
- Elevation: 1.0 m (3.3 ft)
- Highest elevation: 200 m (660 ft)
- Lowest elevation: 0 m (0 ft)

Population (2024 census)
  - Total: 42,172
  - Density: 53.247/km^{2} (137.91/sq mi)
  - Households: 6,842

Economy
  - Income class: 1st municipal income class
  - Poverty incidence: 54.33% (2023)
  - Revenue: ₱ 319.6 million (2024)
  - Assets: ₱ 301.9 million (2024)
  - Expenditure: ₱ 186.1 million (2024)
  - Liabilities: ₱ 4.44 million (2024)

Service provider
  - Electricity: Tawi Tawi Electric Cooperative (TAWELCO)
- Time zone: UTC+8 (PST)
- ZIP code: 7506
- PSGC: 1907005000
- IDD : area code: +63 (0)68
- Native languages: Sama; Tagalog; Sabah Malay
- Website: www.sitangkai.gov.ph

Sitangkai, officially the Municipality of Sitangkai (Tagalog: Bayan ng Sitangkai), is a municipality in the province of Tawi-Tawi, Philippines. According to the 2024 census, it has a population of 42,172 people. It is the southernmost place in the Philippines and is near the maritime borders with Malaysia and Indonesia.

It is called the "Venice of the South" due to the use of boats as primary transportation, although footbridges connect one house to another. The major sources of livelihood are fishing and farming, although there is very sparse agricultural land available.

The Frances Reef located in the town of Sitangkai is geographically the southernmost point of the Philippines.

The town is noted for being a major Eucheuma seaweed farming hub in the Philippines.

== Etymology ==
According to legends, Sitangkai was named after a beautiful Sama-Bajau teenager, the only and lovely daughter of a man named Panglima. The young woman is said to have used the pen-name "Tangkai" ( from the Sinama word "atangkai-tangkai" due to her good looking neck). In 1900, the name island began to be referred to as "Saluru" (from the Malay word for entire) in reference to waters flooding the town from all direction during high tide.

In early 1903, the island reportedly became known as "Sitankan" and later in 1918 named "Sitangki". It was named after a Tang Kay, a Chinese national who owned a water tank, which in native language is called "tangkih". In 1939, the island became known as "SiTangkai". In 1948, this was "corrected" by a Chinese businessman into "SyTangkai".

== History ==
=== Sulu Sultanate ===
During the Sulu Sultanate era, the area which would later become part of the Sitangkai municipality is part of the principality of Sibutu and Sitankai.

=== American period ===
Sitangkai under the American administration of the Philippines was governed as a municipal district. The Executive Order No. 5 of 1916 under the Department of Mindanao and Sulu defines the territory of the Sitangkai municipal district as including the islands of Sitangkai, Sibutu, Imapui, Sipañgkut, Tumindan, and all small islands adjacent thereto lying south of 5° north latitude and between Alice Channel and Sibutu Passage. Sitangkai island is the seat of the municipal district.

=== Post-Commonwealth ===
President Carlos P. Garcia issued Executive Order No. 355 on August 26, 1959 which retroactively converted twenty municipal districts of the then-undivided Sulu, including Sitangkai into municipalities on July 1, 1958.

In the 1970s, the Sitangkai municipal government began promoting Eucheuma seaweed farming. Suppression of the Moro separatist movement in this period caused the Sama peopl across the Sulu archipelago to flee to the southwest including to Sitangkai or the Zamboanga Peninsula. In 1973, President Ferdinand Marcos issued a decree creating the Tawi-Tawi province from Sulu.

By 1987, Sitangkai became a major seaweed farming hub in the Philippines.

On October 21, 2006, with the ratification of Muslim Mindanao Autonomy Act No. 197, 16 of its 25 barangays were transferred to the newly created municipality of Sibutu, all of which were located on Sibutu Island.

== Geography ==
Sitangkai is situated in the southwestern portion of the Sulu Archipelago and is under the jurisdiction of Tawi-Tawi province. The town consist of thirteen islands and is noted for its extensive reefs. Tumindao is the largest island of the municipality with a total area of 34.3 square kilometers (13.2 sq mi) or 57.45 percent. Umapoy is the second largest, making up 9.2 percent of the town, then Sipangkot at third with 5.1 percent. The smallest islands Maldanas, Malmanok and Saluag are located in the south. Panguan Island is the remote island in the town.

=== Barangays ===
Sitangkai is politically subdivided into 9 barangays. They cover the islands of Tumindao, Sipangkot and Sitangkai Dikih. Each barangay consists of puroks while some have sitios.

- Datu Baguinda Putih
- Imam Sapie
- North Larap
- Panglima Alari
- Sipangkot
- Sitangkai Poblacion
- South Larap (Larap)
- Tongmageng
- Tongusong

=== Climate ===
Sitangkai has a tropical rainforest climate (Af) with heavy rainfall year-round.

Climate data for Sitangkai
Month	Jan	Feb	Mar	Apr	May	Jun	Jul	Aug	Sep	Oct	Nov	Dec	Year
Mean daily maximum °C (°F)	29.7 (85.5)	29.8 (85.6)	30.4 (86.7)	31.1 (88.0)	31.6 (88.9)	31.4 (88.5)	31.3 (88.3)	31.7 (89.1)	31.6 (88.9)	31.3 (88.3)	30.8 (87.4)	30.2 (86.4)	30.9 (87.6)
Daily mean °C (°F)	26.2 (79.2)	26.3 (79.3)	26.6 (79.9)	27.0 (80.6)	27.4 (81.3)	27.2 (81.0)	27.0 (80.6)	27.3 (81.1)	27.2 (81.0)	27.0 (80.6)	26.8 (80.2)	26.6 (79.9)	26.9 (80.4)
Mean daily minimum °C (°F)	22.8 (73.0)	22.9 (73.2)	22.9 (73.2)	23.0 (73.4)	23.2 (73.8)	23.0 (73.4)	22.8 (73.0)	22.9 (73.2)	22.8 (73.0)	22.8 (73.0)	22.9 (73.2)	23.0 (73.4)	22.9 (73.2)
Average rainfall mm (inches)	199 (7.8)	156 (6.1)	133 (5.2)	139 (5.5)	190 (7.5)	176 (6.9)	150 (5.9)	131 (5.2)	127 (5.0)	181 (7.1)	197 (7.8)	185 (7.3)	1,964 (77.3)
Source: Climate-Data.org

== Government ==
The following people have been mayor of Sitangkai:

- Hadji Mocthar Sulayman (1946)
- Datu Amilhamja Jaafar (1954–1960)
- Hadji Mansul Harun (1960–1960)
- Celso Palma
- Oyong Ismael
- Datu Young Baguinda (1980–1986)
- Hadji Mansul Harun (1986)
- Hadji Gaffor Harun (1987)
- Datu Allong Mahmon (1987-1988)
- Paquito Tan (1988-1998)
- Tiblan Ahaja (1998-2007)
- Hadji Serbin Ahaja (2007–2016)
- Tiblan Ahaja (2016–2025)
- Hadji Allan Ahaja (2025–)

== Demographics ==
Sama women with a kulintang in Sitangkai.

The Sama people are a noted ethnic group in Sitangkai and speak Southern Sama.

Population census of Sitangkai
Year	Pop.	±% p.a.
1903	1,155	—
1918	6,598	+12.32%
1939	6,812	+0.15%
1948	9,228	+3.43%
1960	10,624	+1.18%
1970	13,738	+2.60%
1975	15,066	+1.87%
1980	27,419	+12.72%
1990	34,493	+2.32%
1995	36,027	+0.82%
2000	52,772	+8.53%
2007	40,641	−3.54%
2010	30,514	−9.90%
2015	33,334	+1.70%
2020	37,319	+2.41%
2024	42,172	+2.98%
Source: Philippine Statistics Authority

== Economy ==
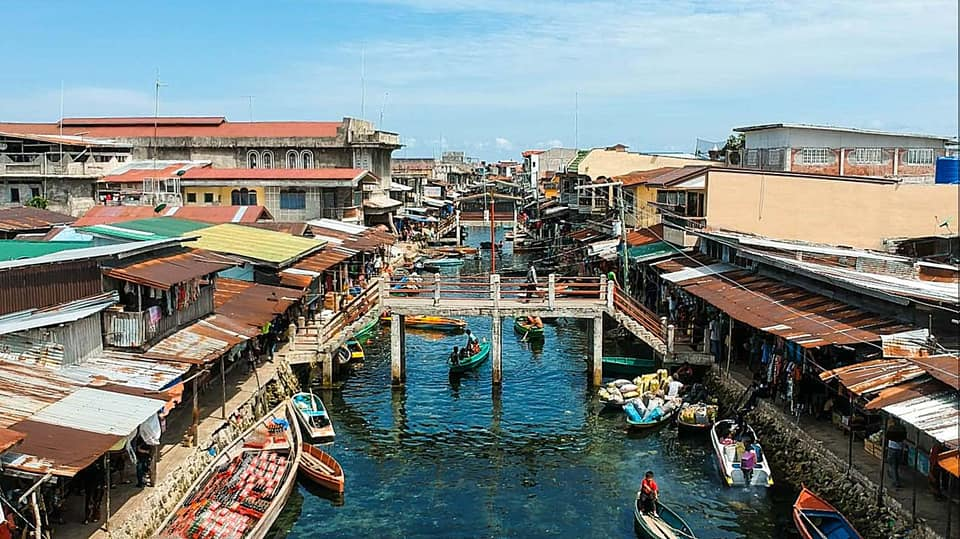
Marketplace alongside a canal in Sitangkai.

Vendors selling goods in boats.

Sitangkai is often referred to as the "Venice of the South" with boats being the primary mode of transportation within the town. Its location as the southernmost town in the Philippines makes the town as a trading port for transporting goods to and from neighboring Malaysia.

Sitangkai, dubbed as the "Seaweeds Capital of the Philippines" as well as the "Cottoni Seaweeds Capital of the World", is noted for its Eucheuma or "Cottoni" seaweed farming industry. Seaweeds has been farmed in the reef flats in waters adjacent to Semporna, Malaysia.

Poverty Incidence of Sitangkai

Source: Philippine Statistics Authority

== Healthcare ==
As of 2021, there is no hospital in Sitangkai.
